= Geary Bus Rapid Transit =

Bus rapid transit project in San Francisco

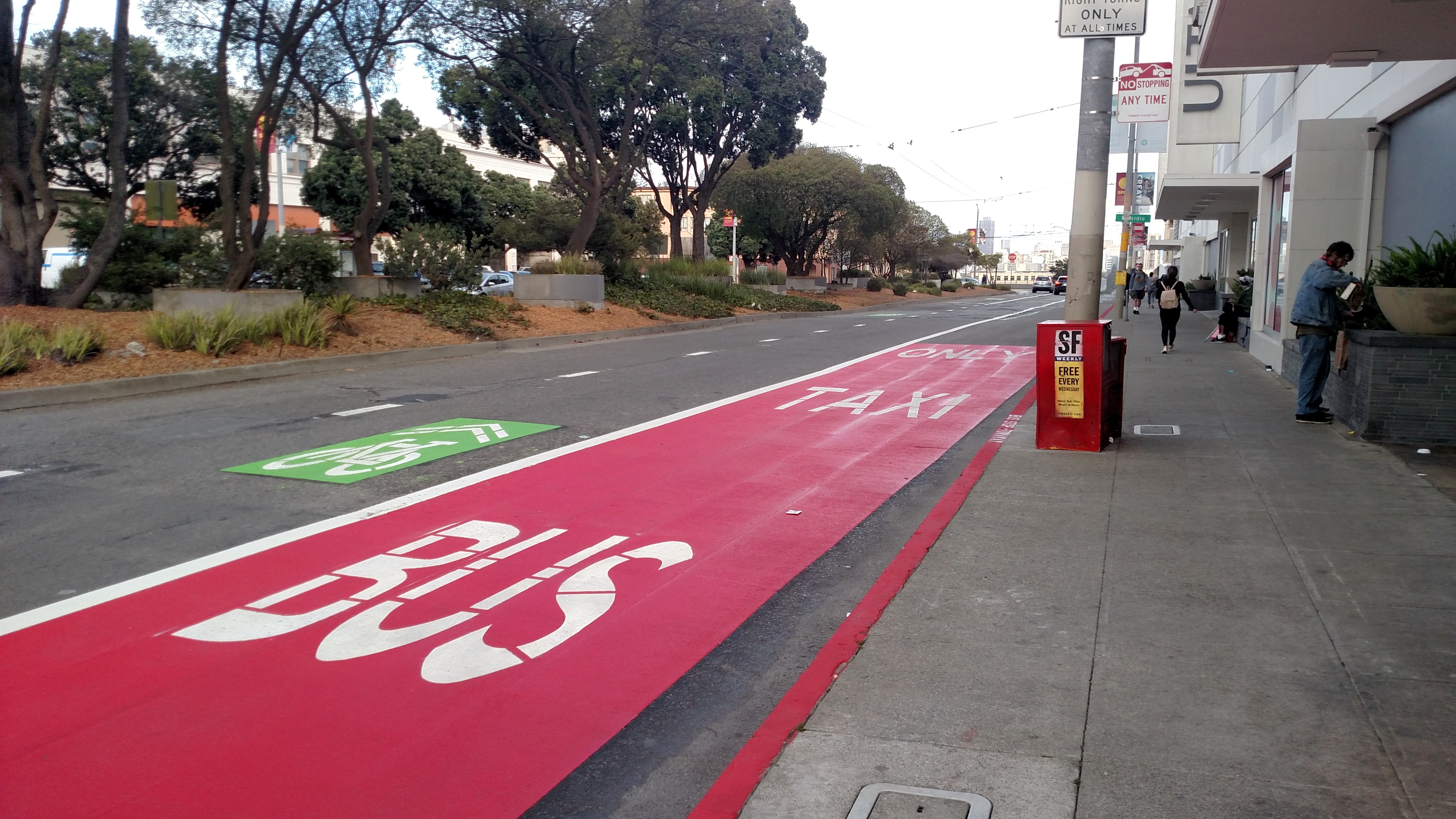
- Red transit-only lane on Geary near Masonic Av, October 2018

Overview
- Owner: San Francisco Municipal Transportation Agency
- Locale: San Francisco, California, United States
- Stations: 26

Service
- Type: Bus rapid transit
- System: San Francisco Municipal Railway
- Services: Muni: 38, 38R, 38AX, 38BX

History
- Opened: February 2021

The Geary Bus Rapid Transit project added bus rapid transit features to San Francisco Municipal Railway bus lines along Geary Boulevard. The corridor serves routes 38, 38R, 38AX, 38BX which combined to serve 52,900 daily riders in 2019, the most of any corridor in the city. The project added transit-only lanes, painted red, along many sections of Geary between the Salesforce Transit Center and 33rd Avenue. After the project’s completion, over 75% of the Geary corridor now has transit lanes.

The original plan called for consolidating some stops in a center-running configuration, as was done for the Van Ness Bus Rapid Transit project. In early 2021, as part of emergency changes related to the COVID-19 pandemic, SFMTA added side-running bus lanes along Geary. Based on the success of these "temporary emergency transit lanes" in increasing bus speeds with minimal impacts to car traffic, SFMTA made the side-running bus lanes permanent. Side-running transit lanes are less efficient than center-running configurations, and this decision has been criticized as a downgrade from the original plan.

== Project details ==
Geary BRT provides transit service improvements primarily through the use of bus lanes. The project plans for red-painted bus priority lanes on most of the route of the 38-Geary along Geary Boulevard. These lanes run along the side of the street adjacent to the curb or parking spaces on the section of the corridor east of Stanyan Street, which includes neighborhoods such as the Tenderloin and Japantown. The bus lanes run in the center of the street west of Stanyan to around 27th Avenue in the Richmond District and Laurel Heights. The bus lanes then switch to side running from 27th Avenue to 34th Avenue.

The project will also implement transit improvements such as bulb-outs for bus stops and traffic signal updates. The combination of bus lanes and other improvements is expected to reduce travel times on the 38-Geary by 10-20% when traveling the entire route from 48th Avenue to the Salesforce Transit Center. This translates to a travel time reduction of roughly 10 minutes on a trip that takes around one hour. The travel time reduction is expected to be 15-30% between Van Ness Avenue and 25th Avenue.

In addition to transit service upgrades, the project is intended to improve pedestrian safety on the corridor. For example, the project includes several upgraded pedestrian crossings adjacent to Japantown. Additionally, the project will narrow parts of Geary Boulevard to two lanes of automobile traffic down from three lanes.

== History ==
=== Previous use as a streetcar corridor ===
In the early 1900s, the Geary Boulevard corridor was served by streetcar routes such as the A Geary-10th Avenue, B Geary, and C Geary-California lines. These streetcar lines were all eliminated by 1956 as buses replaced streetcars in San Francisco. Subsequently, replacement rail service on Geary was proposed multiple times, such as in the original plans for the Bay Area Rapid Transit system.

=== Geary corridor planning ===
In 1989, the city of San Francisco approved Proposition B, a ballot measure that approved a half-cent sales tax for transportation. The expenditure plan that was included in the proposition prioritized the planning and implementation of transit expansion along four transit corridors including Geary Boulevard. Subsequently, the San Francisco County Transportation Authority (SFCTA) conducted a study, titled the Four Corridor Plan, to determine the details of the transportation improvements along the corridors included in the Proposition B plan. The study called for a subway-surface rail line along Geary.

=== Refocused to bus rapid transit ===
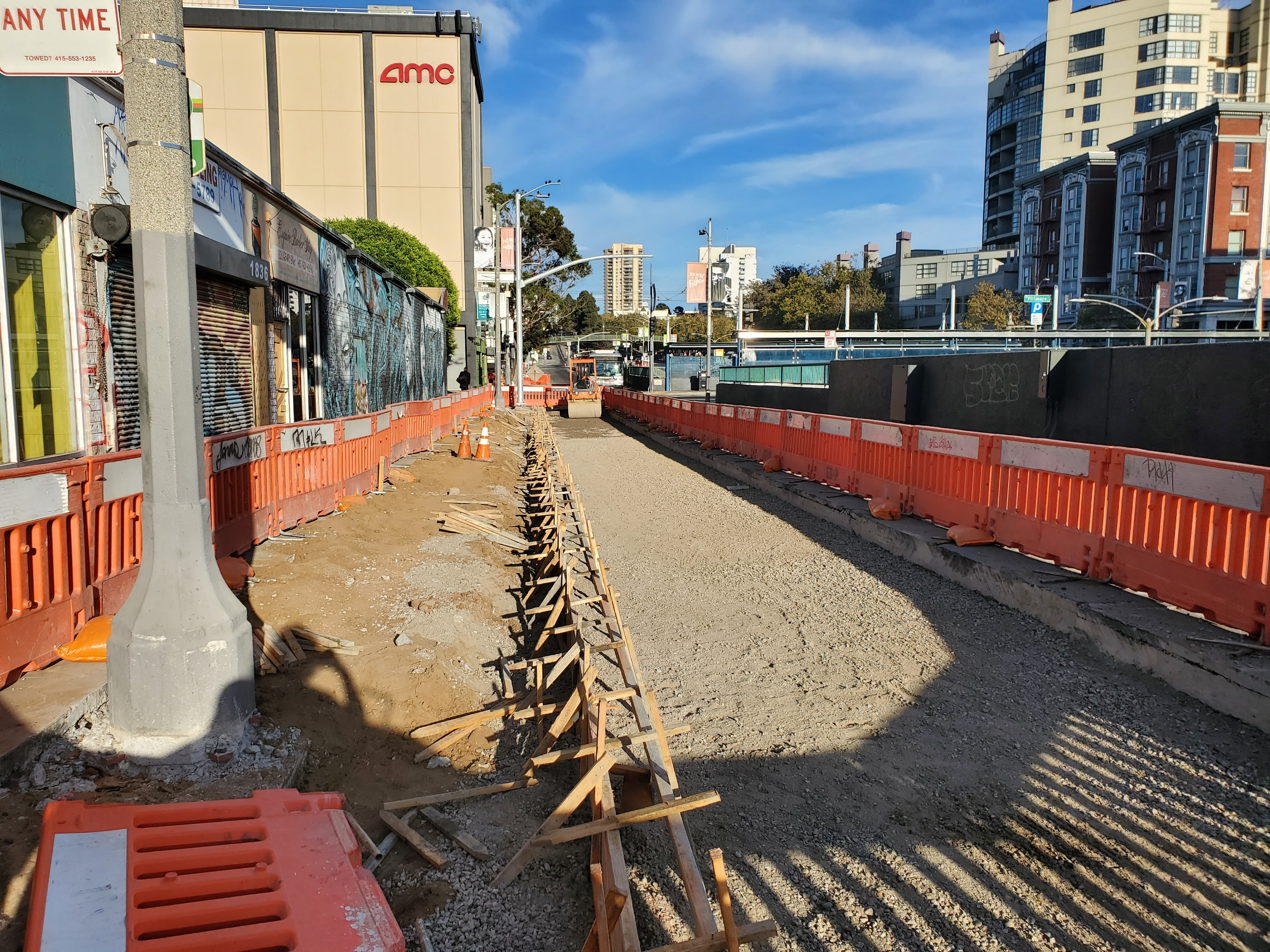
Construction work in 2020

With the Proposition B tax expiring in 2010, the voters of San Francisco approved Proposition K in 2003 that extended the tax and established a new expenditure plan. The new plan funded the Geary Bus Rapid Transit project and mandated the implementation of a bus rapid transit network, with the first two lines consisting of Geary BRT and Van Ness Bus Rapid Transit. Proposition K mandates that Geary BRT be built to "rail-ready standards" to accommodate a planned future conversion to light rail.

Subsequently, in 2007 the SFCTA published a feasibility report for the project. Starting in 2008, the SFCTA started an environmental impact review process. In 2017, the SFCTA approved the final environmental impact report for the project after thirteen years of studying the feasibility and impacts for the proposed bus infrastructure. With that milestone, the project was handed off to the San Francisco Municipal Transportation Agency for design and implementation.

Construction was broken up into two separate, complementary projects.

The first phase of work, called the Geary Rapid Project, would install red bus lanes, upgrade traffic signals, add new crosswalks, and build bus bulbs from Market Street west to Stanyan Street. The Environmental Impact Statement for the first phase was approved by the federal Department of Transportation on June 1, 2018. The final design of the first phase, after several revisions based on community input, was approved by the SFMTA board in August 2018. Construction on the project started in early 2019 and concluded in fall 2021.

The second phase, called the Geary Boulevard Improvement Project, picked up at the end of the first phase at Stanyan Street and would take the improvements further west to 34th Avenue. One of the major differences from the first phase would be the addition of "center-running" transit lanes (similar to those built for the Van Ness Bus Rapid Transit project) in the middle of the street between Arguello Boulevard and 28th Avenue.

At the start of the COVID-19 pandemic, the second phase was in the detailed design phase. That work was put on pause, as SFMTA focused on installing Temporary Emergency Transit Lanes (TETL) on several transit corridors. The TETL project installed side-running transit-only lanes on Geary over much of the footprint of the second phase: between Stanyan Street and 15th Avenue, and between 24th Avenue and 33rd Avenue. The project also installed several "transit head start" signals and wooden bus bulbs. SFMTA found that the temporary side-running lanes kept bus travel times from increasing as auto congestion returned. The SFMTA considered these results to be satisfying enough to retain the side-running transit lanes permanently instead of constructing a center-running corridor as originally planned. The second phase of the project will now focus on making the temporary improvements permanent.

== See also ==
- Geary Subway
- Van Ness Bus Rapid Transit
