= Van Ness Bus Rapid Transit =

Bus rapid transit corridor in San Francisco, California

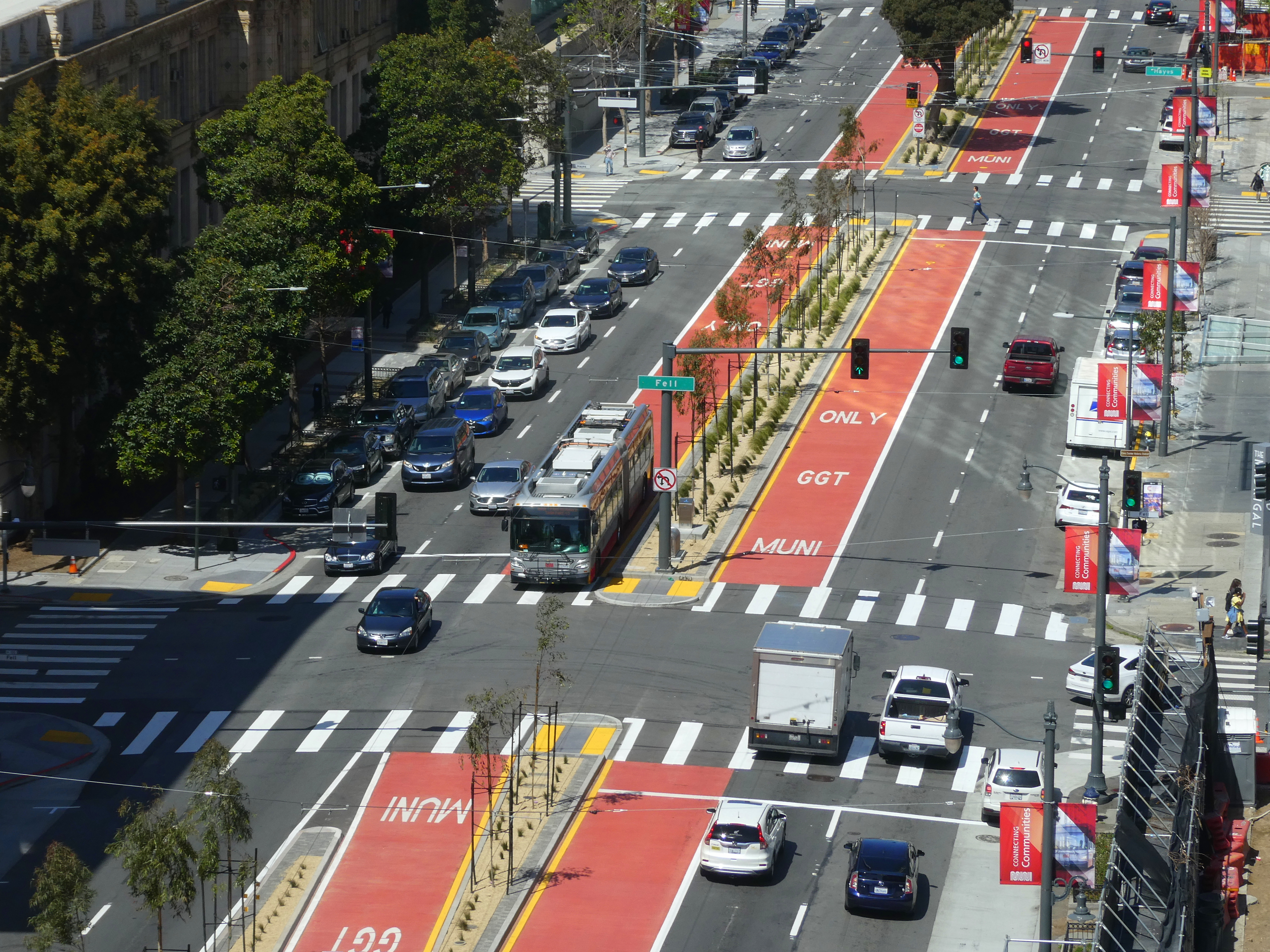
- A southbound Muni bus at Fell Street in April 2022

Overview
- Other name: Van Ness Improvement Project
- Owner: San Francisco Municipal Transportation Agency
- Locale: San Francisco, California, United States
- Termini: Lombard Street; Mission Street
- Stations: 9
- Website: sfmta.com/VanNess

Service
- Type: Bus rapid transit
- System: San Francisco Municipal Railway
- Services: Muni: 49, 90; Golden Gate Transit: 101, 120

History
- Opened: April 1, 2022

Technical
- Line length: 1.96 miles (3.15 km)
- Electrification: Parallel overhead lines, 600 V DC
Route map
Van Ness Bus Rapid Transit highlighted in red

Van Ness Bus Rapid Transit is a bus rapid transit (BRT) corridor on Van Ness Avenue in San Francisco, California, United States. The 1.96-mile (3.15 km) line, which runs between Mission Street and Lombard Street, has dedicated center bus lanes and nine stations. It was built as part of the $346 million Van Ness Improvement Project, which also included utility replacement and pedestrian safety features. Van Ness Bus Rapid Transit is primarily used by the San Francisco Municipal Railway (Muni) 49 Van Ness/Mission line, as well as two Golden Gate Transit routes.

Public transit on Van Ness Avenue began with streetcar service in 1915. It was replaced by trolleybuses in 1950–51, with diesel bus routes later added. Planning for a rail line on the corridor began in 1989 with the passage of a ballot measure. By 1995, it was to be the last of four major rail corridors constructed in the city. The planned mode was replaced with BRT in 2003, with studies and environmental analysis lasting the next decade. Construction began in June 2016; the planned completion in 2019 was delayed several times. The corridor opened to service on April 1, 2022.

== Design ==
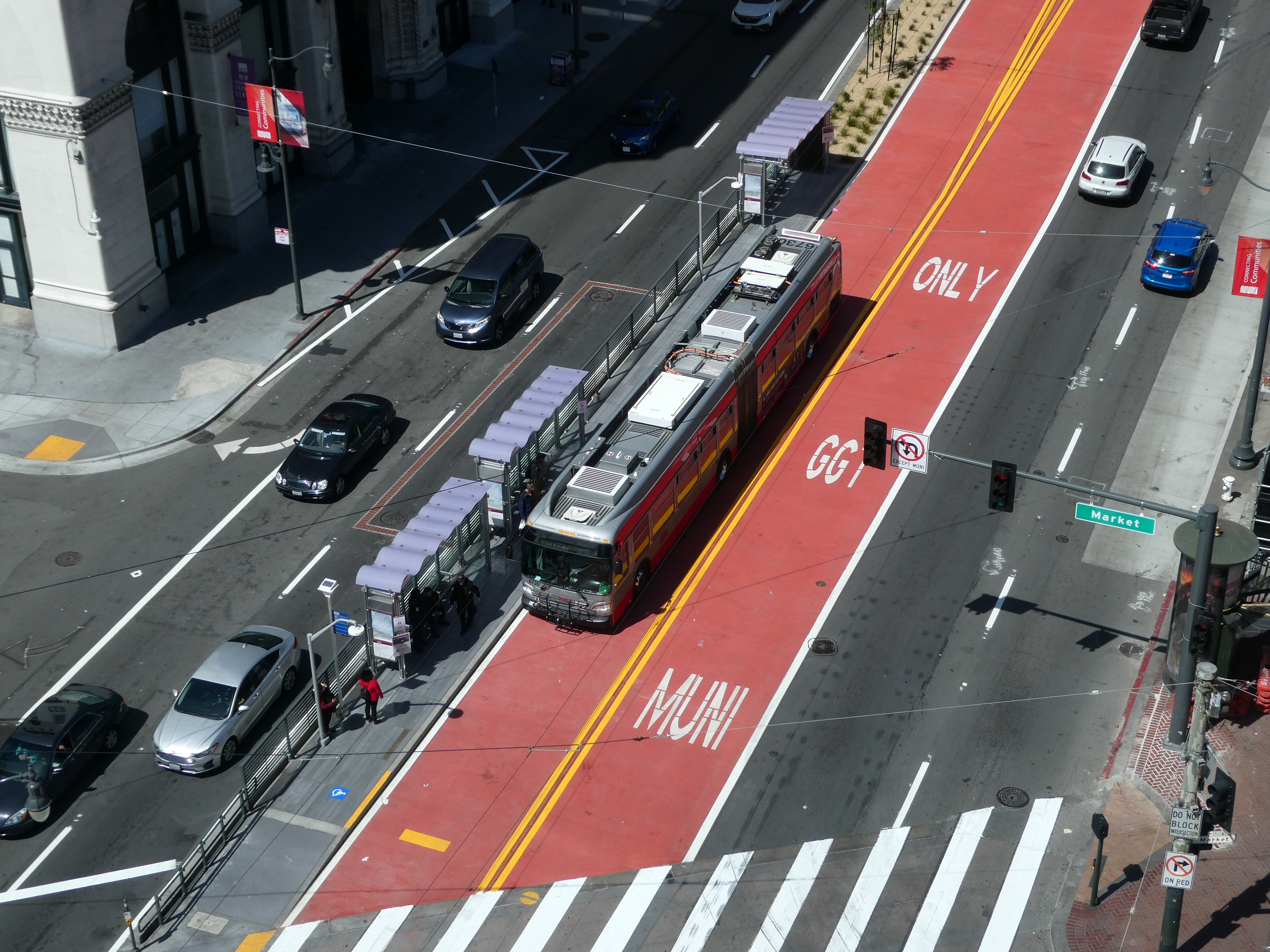
The red center bus lanes and the southbound platform at Market Street

The Van Ness BRT corridor is 1.96 miles (3.15 km) long, running north–south between Lombard Street and Mission Street. Van Ness Avenue has six travel lanes on this section – two general-purpose lanes in each direction, plus center-running red bus lanes. Nine stations are located along the corridor, each with side platforms on the right side of buses. A landscaped center median is located between the bus lanes except at stations. The northbound bus lane exits at Filbert Street, with a marked transition for buses to move to the curb lane. The red lanes on Van Ness are poured red concrete, rather than paint or thermoplastic markings applied over conventional pavement, for increased durability. A 6-inch-thick (150 mm) layer of reinforced concrete was poured as the foundation, followed by a curing compound. The red concrete was then poured, with dowel baskets to join adjacent slabs, then topped with a color hardener layer. The finished lane pavement has a compressive strength of 8,000 pounds per square inch (55,000 kPa), 60% stronger than a typical roadway, extending its life.

=== Services and stations ===
All services using Van Ness BRT operate only part of their length on the BRT lanes; they operate in mixed traffic or on separately installed bus lanes off the Van Ness corridor. SFMTA normally operates one primary route along the full length of the BRT corridor – 49 Van Ness/Mission – with headways as low as 6 minutes. The 90 San Bruno Owl operates on the corridor at 30 minutes frequencies between 12 a.m. and 5 a.m. as part of the Muni Owl All-Nighter Service. In April 2020, SFMTA suspended the 47 Van Ness bus route due to the COVID-19 pandemic in California, leaving only route 49 running the full length of Van Ness BRT. Golden Gate Transit (GGT) operates two routes along the Van Ness BRT corridor: 101 and 120. GGT buses use only the seven stops from Union to Eddy, as they run on Golden Gate Avenue and McAllister Street to reach downtown San Francisco.

The Van Ness BRT alignment has nine stations named after cross streets. Market Street station is located at Van Ness station, providing transfer to Muni Metro, while a transfer to the Geary BRT service is available at Geary–O'Farrell station.

Street	Image	Routes	Muni connections
Union	A bus stop in the median of an urban arterial	Muni: 49, 90; GGT: 101, 120	45
Vallejo	A bus stop with a trolleybus in the median of an urban arterial	Muni: 49, 90; GGT: 101, 120	—
Jackson	A bus stop in the median of an urban arterial	Muni: 49, 90; GGT: 101, 120	12, 27
Sacramento	A bus stop with bus in the median of an urban arterial	Muni: 49, 90; GGT: 101, 120	California; 1
Sutter	A bus stop with bus in the median of an urban arterial	Muni: 49, 90; GGT: 101, 120	—
Geary–O'Farrell	A bus stop with bus in the median of an urban arterial	Muni: 49, 90; GGT: 101, 120	38, 38R (Geary BRT)
Eddy	A bus stop in the median of an urban arterial	Muni: 49, 90; GGT: 101, 120	31
McAllister	A bus stop in the median of an urban arterial	Muni: 49, 90	5, 5R
Market (Van Ness station)	A bus stop with bus in the median of an urban arterial	Muni: 49, 90	7, 9, 9R, 14, 14R

=== Cost ===
As rated in November 2014 by the Federal Transit Administration (FTA), the project was planned to cost $162.7 million, with approximately $75 million to be provided as federal funding under the Small Starts Project Development Program. In December 2016, the FTA awarded the $75 million Small Starts grant. The entire Van Ness Improvement Project had a budget of $309 million when construction began. By 2022, the budget for only the transit improvements had grown to $169.6 million, with a total project cost of $346 million. Part of the increased cost was covered by contingency funds in the original funding; the FTA also awarded an additional $21.9 million to the project in 2021 using funds allotted from the American Rescue Plan.

A 2021 civil grand jury report determined the planning process had failed to account for the location and future maintenance of underground utility lines; because existing water and sewer lines were buried under the center of Van Ness, they had to be relocated curbside to avoid future disruption of BRT service when these utilities required maintenance. The choice of center bus lanes, rather than side lanes, also required substantial reconfiguration and temporary de-energization of the trolleybus wires. The report found that the choice of center lanes increased the cost and complexity of the project, as well as the overall benefits. Although the general position of the existing utility lines was known as early as 2006, detailed survey maps and routing were not developed until after the project had started construction, and the task of determining exact utility routing fell on the construction contractor rather than SFMTA, exceeding the contractor's intended scope of responsibilities and causing project cost and schedule overruns.

=== Public art ===
Part of Pardo's artwork at Geary–O'Farrell

In August 2013, a selection panel of the San Francisco Arts Commission (SFAC) recommended the proposal from Cuban-born artist Jorge Pardo for consideration by the full SFAC over competing proposals from Norie Sato and Janet Zweig for a series of three sculptures that would be installed at the Market, Sutter and Union stations. Pardo presented a formal proposal in 2015, calling for a series of caged weathering steel sculptures, lit from within. According to Pardo, the three 20 ft-tall (6.1 m) sculptures were intended to be "urban coastal redwood[s] ... made of steel, light and weather". The SFAC formally selected Pardo in September 2015. By 2017, the proposed work and location had been consolidated to a single installation at the two McAllister station platforms; each platform would have thirteen steel-and-polycarbonate light sculptures, distinguished by a warm or cool palette. The Arts Commission authorized a budget of $815,000 for the work on October 2, 2017. This final design subsequently was moved to the Geary–O'Farrell station, with the cool palette on the southbound platform and the warm palette on the northbound platform.

=== Criticism ===
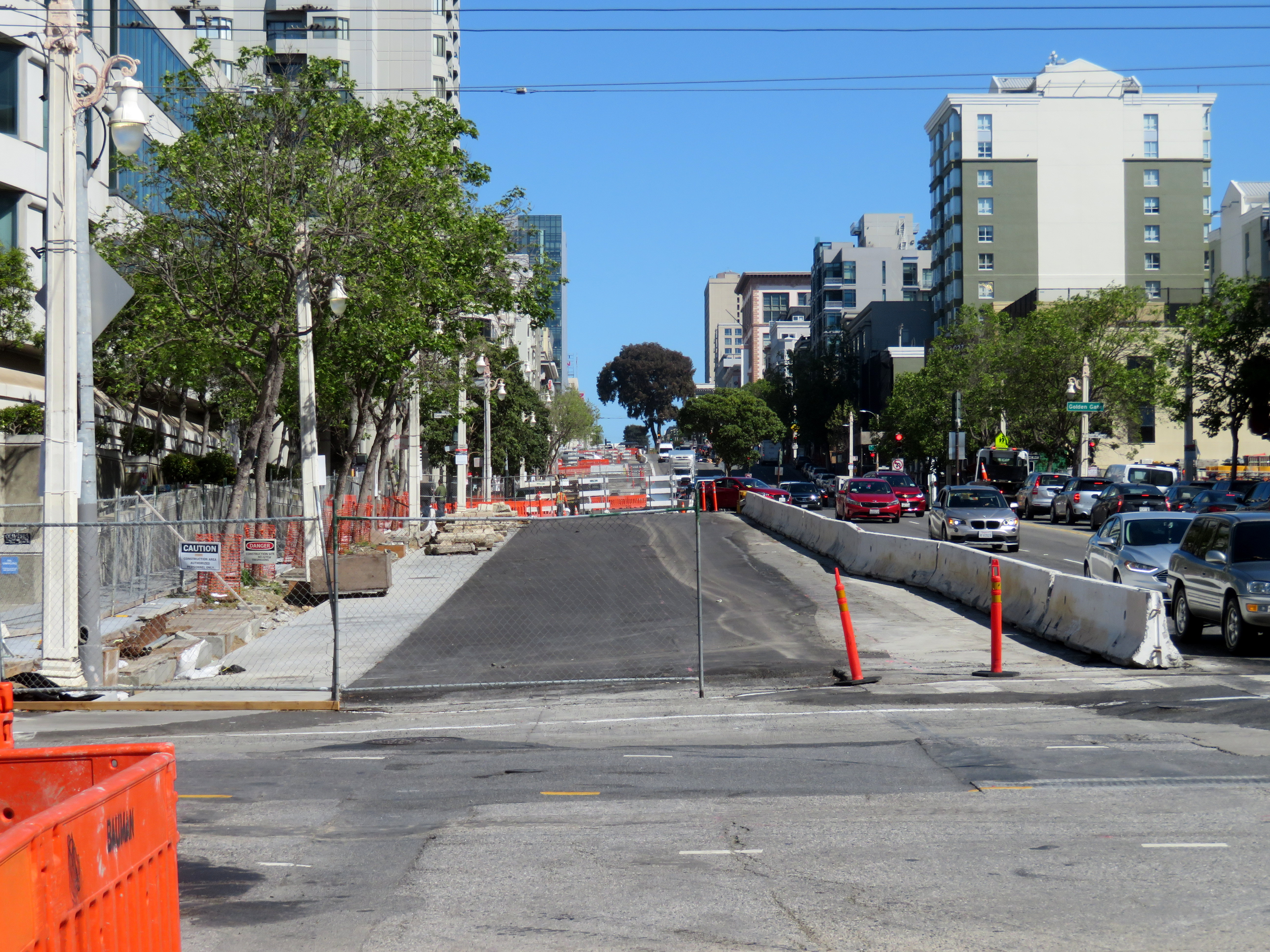
Construction work in 2019, with trees removed and half the roadway closed

Some automobile drivers complained about possible changes in traffic patterns and loss of automobile parking along the corridor. Concerns that trees would be removed were met with plans to plant more trees on the route. Residents supportive of the project complained about continued delays in completing the project, and that the project took longer to complete than other similar projects in other cities because the SFMTA did not close the street to automobile traffic during construction. Businesses along Van Ness complained of lost customers due to construction disruption and the delays in completion. Mayor Ed Lee announced a Construction Mitigation Program (CMP) in September 2017 to provide grants to businesses affected by transit construction, but the focus of that program primarily focused on Union Square businesses and Central Subway construction. CMP funds were not available until November 2019 and were not opened for Van Ness businesses until September 2020.

The project has been criticized for using 6-inch (150 mm) platforms, the standard sidewalk height, instead of 14-inch (360 mm) platforms that would match the level of the bus floor to allow for level boarding. Field tests indicated that interference with wheel lug nuts would create a gap at least 5 in (130 mm) wide between the edge of a 14-inch-high platform and the boarding doors, and bridge plates would be required at middle doors to meet ADA standards for level boarding; the added complexity could impact vehicle reliability. In addition, because the buses would also operate outside the Van Ness BRT corridor, they would continue to need to be equipped with boarding ramps at the front door for regular curbside service.

=== Concrete poles ===
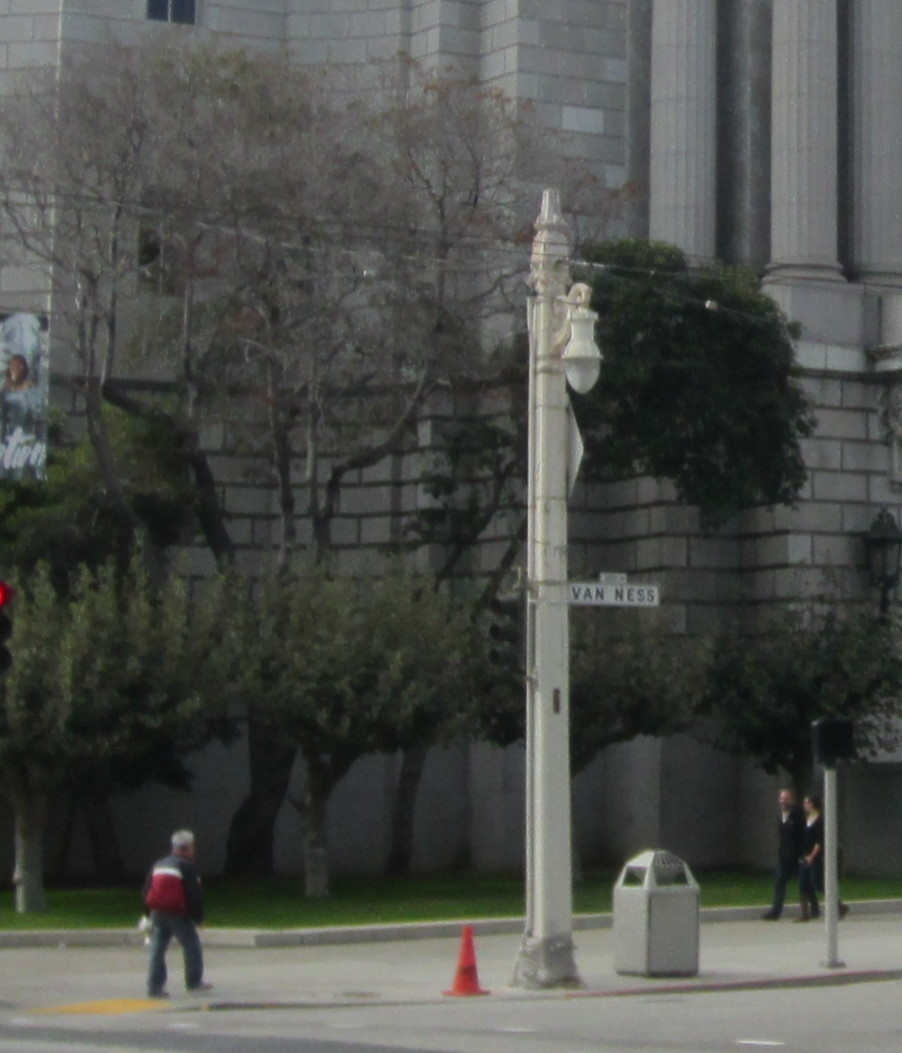
1914/1936 pole at Grove Street in 2018

The original concrete poles built to support the overhead electrical supply lines for the streetcars in 1914 were moved onto the sidewalks in 1936 to accommodate the widening of Van Ness. Since then, the poles have deteriorated due to extra loads from additional wires (added for the electrical return path when the lines were converted to trolleybus service) and modified catenary geometry, exhibiting significant spalling and cracking. In some cases, Muni has supplemented the original concrete poles by moving wires onto adjacent, modern metal poles. By the mid-1980s, records show the city was concerned the original poles could not support their existing loads, and starting in 1997, began replacing missing cast iron pole bases with fiberglass replicas. A 2009 evaluation of the original 1914/36 poles concluded they could not be rehabilitated and retrofitted for use on the modern BRT line because of their shape, height, and inadequate foundation. A separate report determined the original trolley poles were not eligible for retention on a historical basis due to their loss of physical integrity.

The city's Historic Preservation Commission provided conditional approval to remove the original 1914/1936 trolley poles and streetlamps in November 2015, but preservationists were concerned over the loss of the Van Ness "Ribbon of Light", and three prominent organizations formed the "Coalition to Save the Historic Streetlamps of Van Ness Avenue" in 2016. The Board of Supervisors unanimously passed a resolution on September 20, 2016, urging SFMTA to "make all efforts to preserve the historic character of the Van Ness Corridor". As a result, SFMTA approved the installation of 350 vintage-style light fixtures at $18,500 each, adding $6.5 million to the project cost. Ironically, because the proposed fixtures are insufficiently faithful to the original design, the Historic Preservation Commission required that modern-style light poles be used in the Civic Center Historic District instead as "they don't create a lot of visual clutter". As a compromise, four poles were retained and restored in front of San Francisco City Hall and War Memorial Plaza.

== History ==
=== Early streetcar and bus service ===
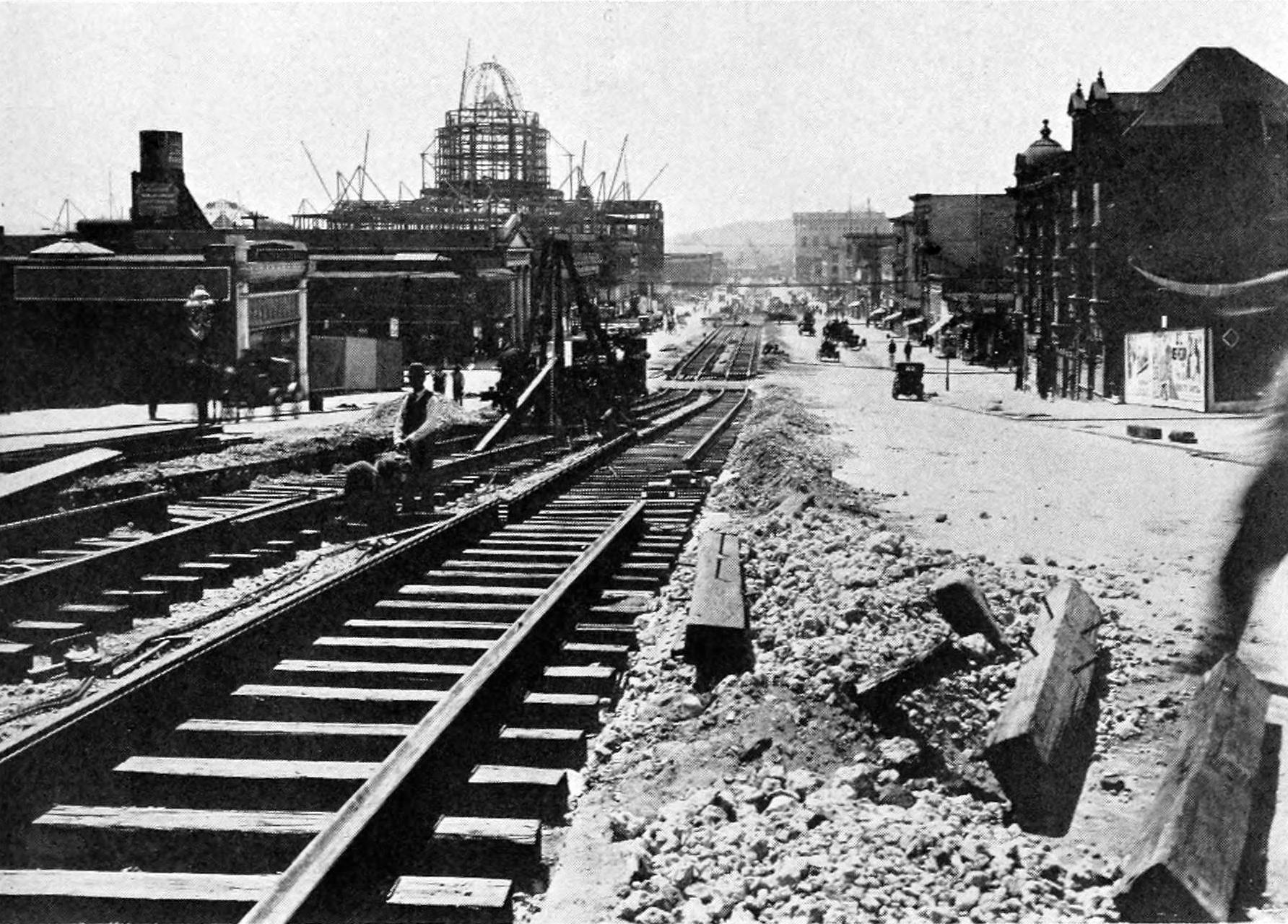
Van Ness Avenue streetcar line under construction in 1914

The San Francisco Municipal Railway was formed in 1909 and opened its first line on Geary Boulevard in 1912. A bond issue to build routes serving the 1915 Panama–Pacific International Exposition was approved in 1913. Construction work started on a Van Ness Avenue line on April 6, 1914; electrical and track work were completed by August 15 of that year, earning the contractors a $15,000 bonus (equivalent to $350,000 in 2024). As completed, the line on Van Ness included 259 concrete poles to support the overhead electrical supply wires, and streetlights were added to the poles one year later.

Streetcar service on Van Ness Avenue began on August 15, 1914. The H Potrero ran the full length of Van Ness Avenue between Bay Street and Market Street, while the D Geary–Van Ness ran on Van Ness Avenue north of Geary Street. Service on the F Stockton route, which used Van Ness Avenue between North Point Avenue and Chestnut Street, began on December 29, 1914. Several other routes also ran on Van Ness for short periods: G Exposition and I Exposition in 1915, J Exposition in 1915–16, J Church in 1917–18, K Ingleside in 1918, and E Union Street and O Van Ness in 1932.

Van Ness, famed as the widest street in the city and for its row of auto dealerships, also became busy with automobile traffic, as it became part of U.S. Route 101 in 1926. In 1934, with the opening of the Golden Gate Bridge imminent, the San Francisco Board of Supervisors proposed to expand surface streets to facilitate automobile traffic, including widening Van Ness from Market to Bay. The widening of the roadway was carried out in 1936 by narrowing the sidewalks. Soon after, the center-running streetcars on Van Ness were faulted for potentially holding up automobiles by their frequent stops. Streetcar service was discontinued on Van Ness — D and H in 1950, and F in 1951 — and the overhead lines were reused for trolleybus service. A median with trees was built down the center of Van Ness.

The 47 Potrero (later 47 Van Ness) trolleybus service that replaced the H Potrero became the primary transit service on Van Ness Avenue for the next several decades, with the 45 Van Ness (the former D) supplementing it between Union Street and Sutter Street, and the 30 Stockton (the former F) between North Point and Chestnut streets. Route 30X Freeway Express (now 30X Marina Express) began using Van Ness Avenue between Broadway and Chestnut Street in 1956. Golden Gate Transit bus service to San Francisco began in January 1972. Civic Center routes used Van Ness Avenue between Lombard Street and McAllister Street, while Financial District routes used it between Lombard Street and North Point Street.

Route 76 Fort Cronkite (now 76X Marin Headlands Express) began intermittent service on Van Ness Avenue in 1976, while the 42 Downtown Loop began operating along the full length of Van Ness Avenue on September 10, 1980. The 49 Van Ness–Mission trolleybus route began operation on August 24, 1983. Route 45 was rerouted off Van Ness Avenue on October 1, 1988, becoming the 45 Union/Stockton. The 47 and the western portion of the 42 were merged into the 47 Van Ness on June 9, 2001.

=== Bus rapid transit planning ===
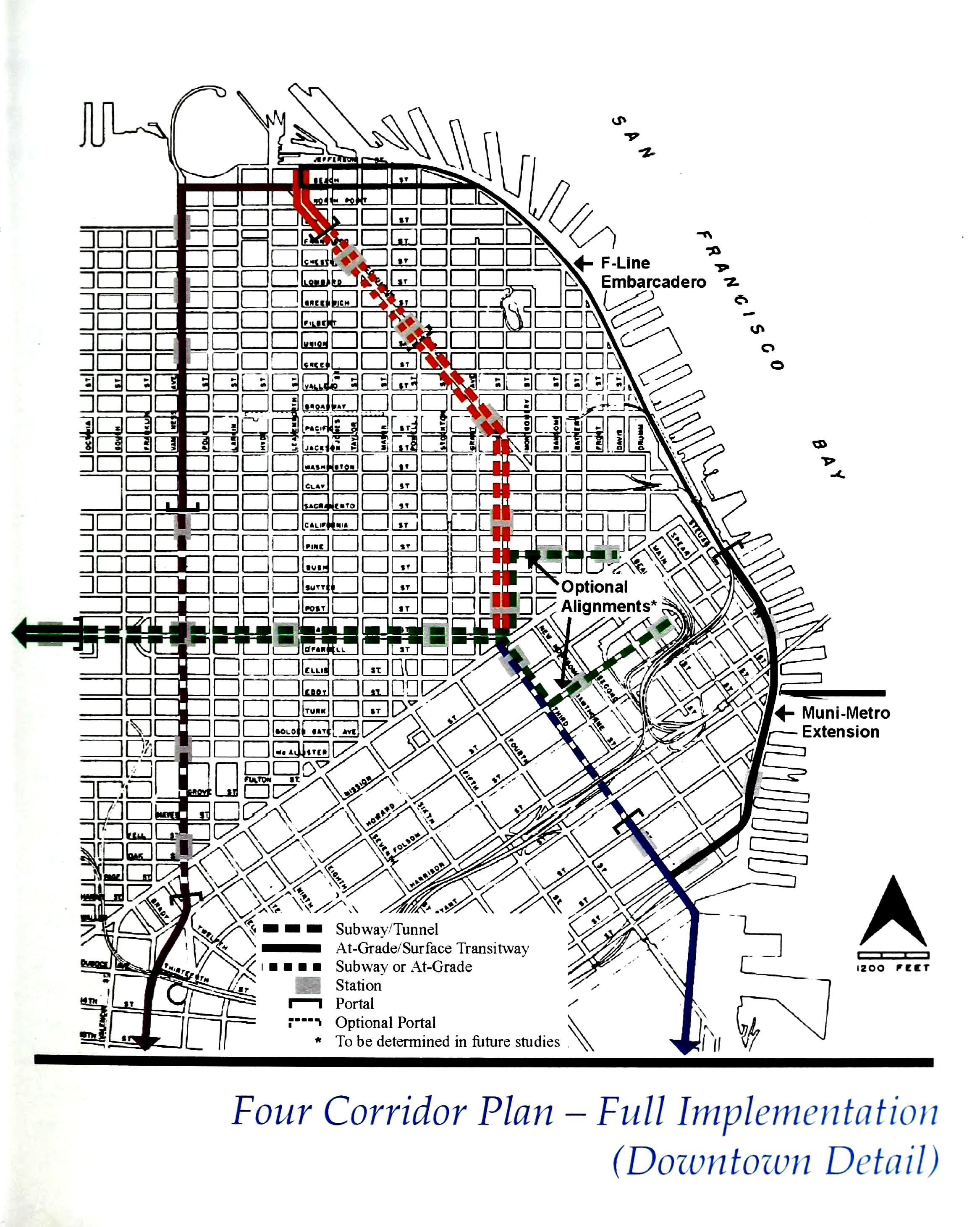
1995 Four Corridor Plan detail map of northeast San Francisco; three of the corridors meet at Market and Geary, while the fourth (purple) runs primarily north–south along Van Ness. Dashed lines indicate subway segments.

The Proposition B sales tax expenditure plan, approved in 1989, included funding for "transit service improvements on Van Ness Avenue". The transit expansion part of the expenditure plan formed the basis of the 1995 Four Corridor Plan by the San Francisco County Transportation Authority (SFCTA), which planned for rail expansions along four priority corridors including Van Ness. The other three corridors included the Bayshore Corridor, which was implemented as the T Third Street Muni line; a proposed rail line along Geary Boulevard, which ultimately became the Geary Bus Rapid Transit project; and a third corridor to North Beach, implemented as the Central Subway project. The Van Ness corridor was to be the last of the four corridors, beyond the twenty year planning timeline of Proposition B. Under the Four Corridor plan, a rail line was to be built along Van Ness Avenue and Mission Street from Aquatic Park to 16th Street Mission station, with a subway section between Market and Pacific streets.

In 2003, with Proposition B expiring in 2010, Proposition K was passed to provide additional sales tax funds. Its specified expenditure plan included BRT on the Geary and Van Ness corridors; these were identified as part of the New Expenditure Plan in the SFCTA Countywide Transportation Plan of 2004. Collectively, the Geary and Van Ness corridors had more than 200,000 automobile-based person-trips per day, with BRT implementation anticipated to remove approximately 4,500 vehicles at peak periods. For Van Ness, the project was planned to include transit signal priority. The SFCTA began to formally plan the project in 2004, with revenue service then planned for 2012. A feasibility study was completed in 2006. The proposed projects on Van Ness and Geary were anticipated to have short construction times (between 18 and 24 months) and lower costs than rail lines.

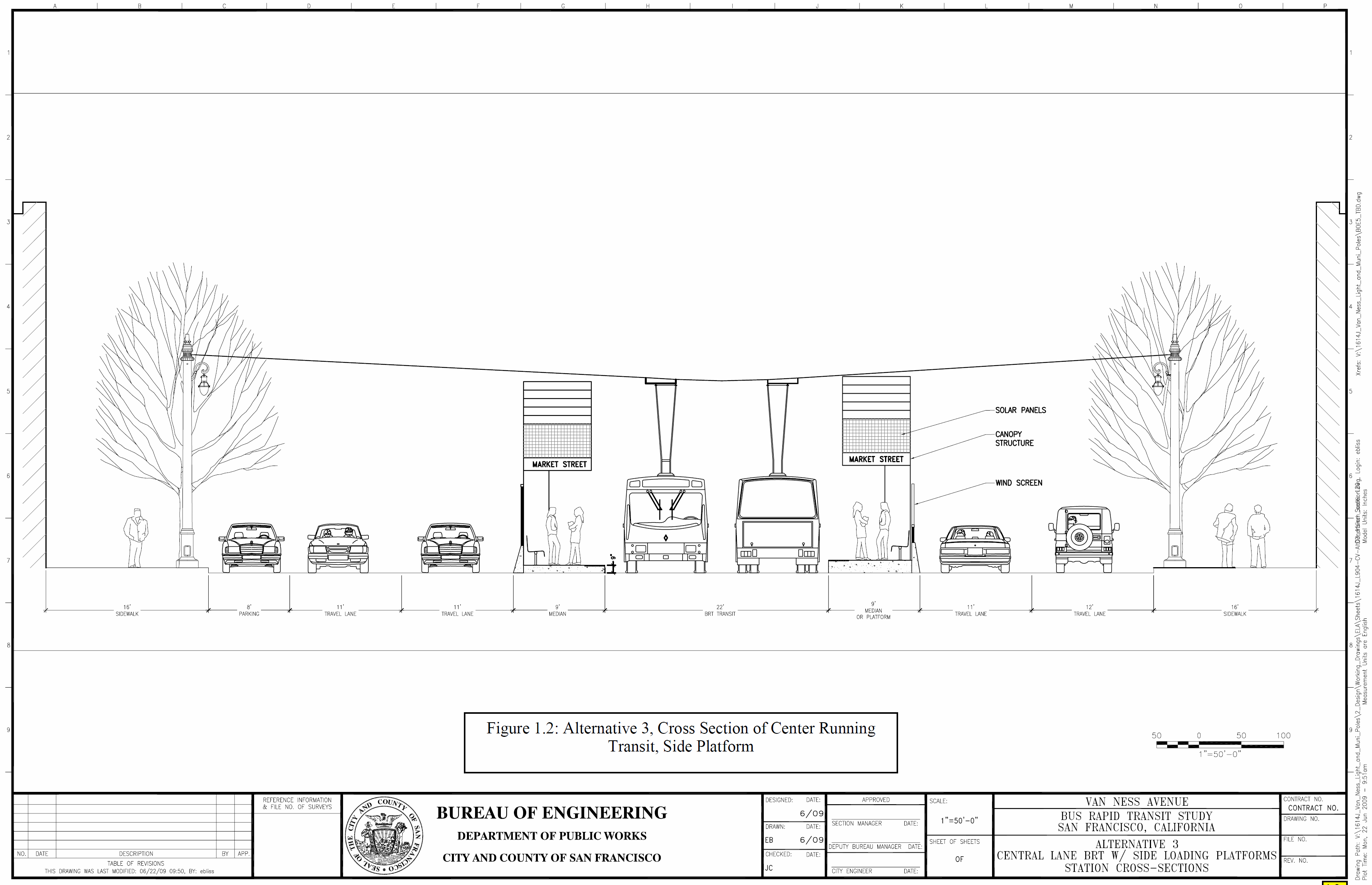
The selected Alternative 3 (median lanes with side platforms)

The feasibility study was followed by a Technical Memorandum in 2008 and the Draft Environmental Impact Statement/Environmental Impact Report (DEIS) in 2011. The DEIS identified three possible designs: curb lanes, median lanes with side platforms, and median lanes with a center island platforms. The proposed service was estimated to reduce overall travel time by one-third and increase ridership by approximately the same proportion.

Alternative 3 – center median lanes with side platforms was identified as the locally-preferred option in 2013 and selected for implementation. The analysis showed that dedicated center lanes for BRT coupled with restricted left turns provided the greatest reduction in travel time compared with existing conditions, with up to 930 passengers per hour per lane with BRT versus 680 via private automobile. Alternative 4 (center platforms), which was not chosen, had carried an additional risk for vehicle procurement. Buses with doors on both sides would be needed, which would be a custom order as no trolleybus was available in North America with dual-sided boarding.

The Final Environmental Impact Statement was released in July 2013, and approved by the SFCTA and SFMTA that September. Changes from the DEIS included several platform locations and elimination of most left turns on Van Ness. Both agencies also approved the addition of an optional southbound platform at Vallejo Street (the northbound platform was already added in the LPA). The Federal Transit Administration approved the FEIS in December 2013. The "lengthy planning, review, and public-participation process" in 2014 was faulted for causing delays in BRT implementation, as opposition to the removal of an automobile lane and impacts to parking were not offset by a local working example demonstrating its benefits. In addition, local opposition to the Van Ness BRT project included public hearings over median changes and tree removal, despite promises to replace 200 mature trees with 400 saplings. Addenda regarding parking loss and street tree removal were published in 2014 and 2016. By 2015, the new BRT service was scheduled to open in early 2019.

=== Construction and opening ===
The first phase of construction involved the removal and replacement of underground water and sewer lines, some of which dated back to the 19th century. Half of the road width was closed at a time, with construction proceeding south simultaneously from Lombard Street and Sutter Street. This first phase was originally expected to last two years; BRT construction in the second phase was to last one year, while operator training, tree planting, and sidewalk work would last two months.

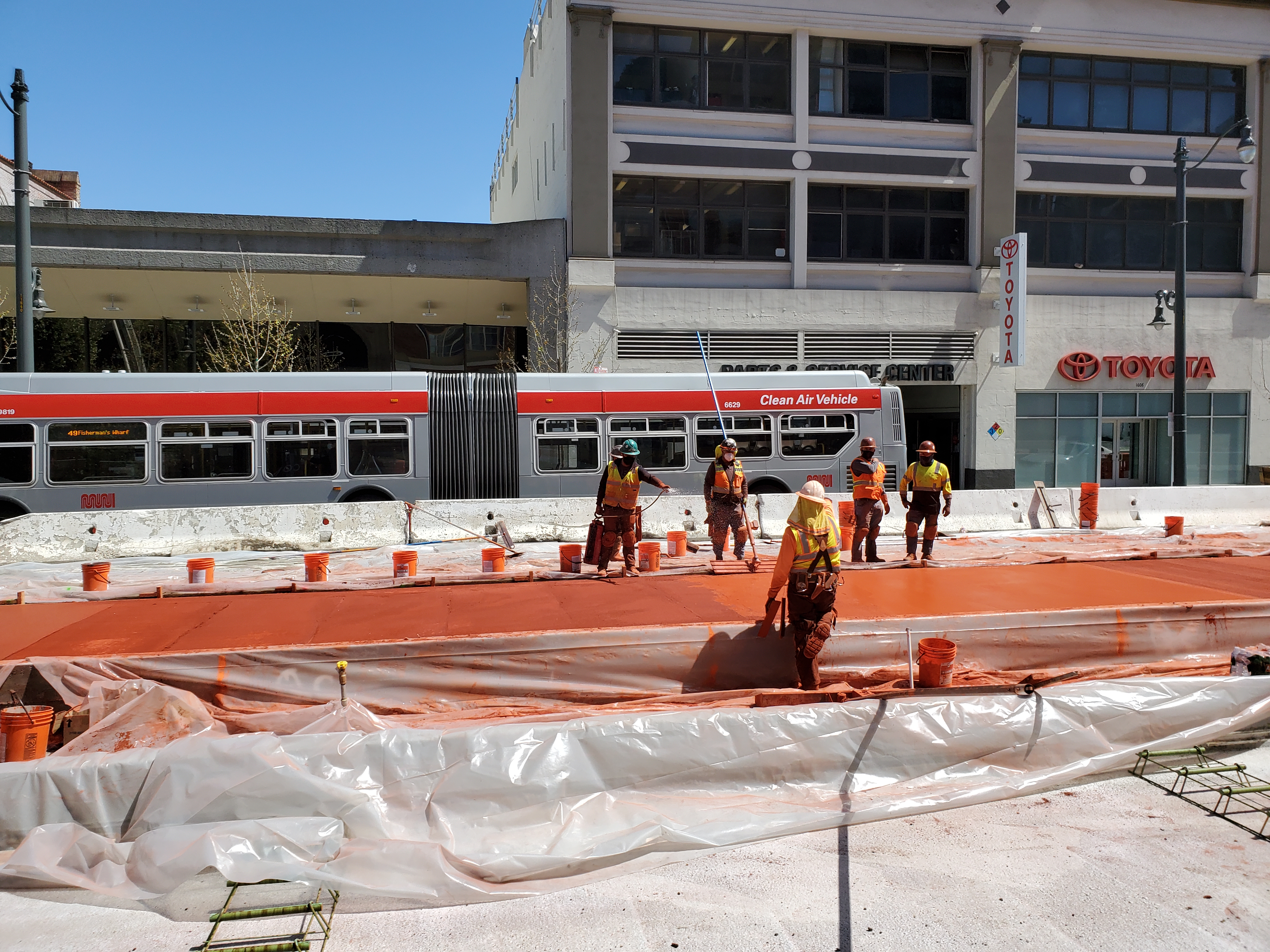
Red concrete being smoothed in 2021

Nine bus stops were eliminated on June 4, 2016, to speed up buses during construction and match the BRT stop spacing. General traffic was reduced from three lanes per direction to two in October 2016, and most left turns were eliminated in November. The one-way Franklin and Gough streets to the west received traffic signal upgrades to accommodate traffic diverted from Van Ness. A groundbreaking ceremony was held on March 1, 2017, with completion then still planned for 2019.

The median was cleared of trees and shrubs in June 2017, and utility work began that August. By October 2017, wet weather and contractor issues had delayed planned completion by six months to mid-2020. An additional five-month delay due to unexpected abandoned utilities was announced in April 2018. Items uncovered during utility work covered a broad range of history, from Ohlone artefacts to abandoned fiber optic cables originally placed during the dot-com boom. Construction was 21% complete by mid-2018. By early 2019, the project was 27% complete; continued utility and contractor conflicts delayed expected completion to late 2021. The first half of utility reconstruction was completed in June 2019, with the second half finished in mid-2020.

Construction of the second phase began in September 2020. Excavation for the second phase uncovered tracks originally used for the California Street Cable Railroad, as well as original Belgian block stones from the early 20th century. Further delays in 2020 pushed the estimated completion to 2022. The first red concrete was poured for the BRT lanes on November 10, 2020, and hundreds of trees were planted along Van Ness at approximately the same time. Species planted include lemon-scented gum along the median and London plane, Brisbane box, and palm trees along the sidewalk. The red concrete pour was completed in July 2021, and work continued on landscaping and median construction.

Testing with Muni and Golden Gate Transit vehicles began on January 12, 2022, followed by driver training. Revenue service began on April 1, 2022. By the end of the month, northbound travel times had decreased by nine minutes – 35% – while ridership on route 49 had increased by 13%. Further decreases in travel time were expected as transit signal priority was activated and adjusted. Route 49 remained temporarily operated solely by motorbuses – as had been the case during BRT construction, since 2016 – pending operations changes enabling its runs to be moved back to Potrero Division. Two trolleybus-operated supplementary runs (not shown in public schedules) operating in the weekday midday period only began operation on July 25, but regular, all-day, seven-days-a-week use of trolleybuses on route 49 did not resume until January 2023 – and temporarily covering only one-quarter of the route's runs. In September 2024, the Institute for Transportation and Development Policy rated Van Ness BRT as "Silver" on its BRT Standard scale.

== See also ==
- Trolleybuses in San Francisco
