= Geary Subway =

Proposed rail tunnel in San Francisco

The Geary Subway is a proposed rail tunnel underneath Geary Boulevard in San Francisco, California. Several plans have been put forward since the 1930s to add a grade-separated route along the corridor for transit. San Francisco Municipal Railway bus routes on the street served 52,900 daily riders in 2019, the most of any corridor in the city.

== Background ==
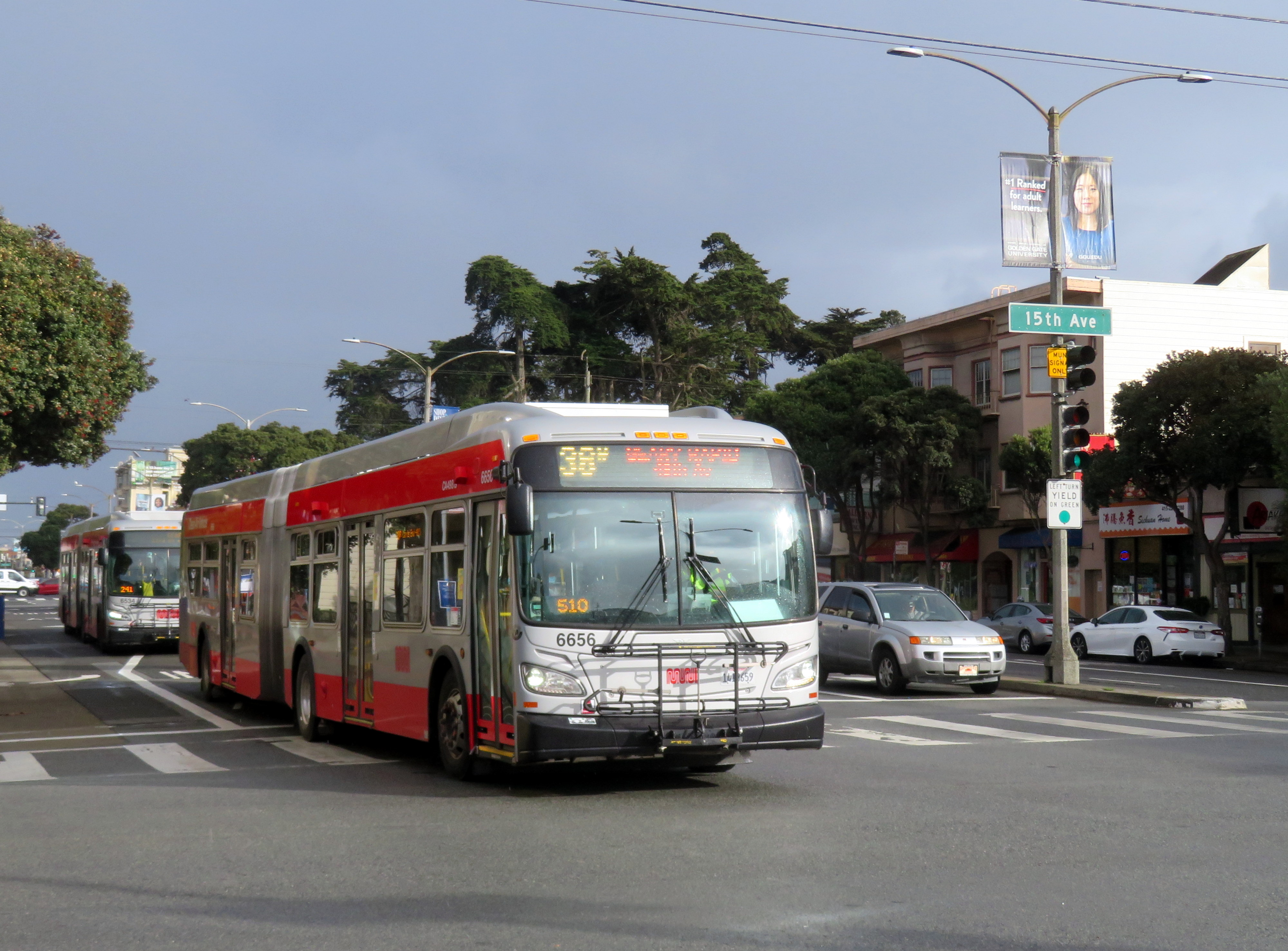
A 38R Geary Rapid bus, January 2021.

The Geary Street, Park and Ocean Railway began operating cable cars on Geary starting in 1880. San Francisco Municipal Railway (Muni) acquired the corridor as its first streetcar line, opening in 1912. The agency's A Geary-10th Avenue, B Geary, C Geary-California, and D Geary-Van Ness lines traversed the street. Rail service ended in 1956 and trips were replaced with buses. By 2008 the 38 Geary and 38R Geary Rapid constituted Muni's most heavily used bus line in the city with over 50,000 passengers per day. In addition, the 1 California and 31/31AX/31BX Balboa combine for an additional 38,000 passengers per day, running parallel approximately 1/4 mi (0.40 km) north and south of 38/38R Geary, respectively.

== Proposals ==
=== Early plans ===
By the 1930s, Geary was the city's most congested transit corridor. In 1931, City Engineer Michael O'Shaughnessy proposed a streetcar subway which would branch from a proposed Market Street subway along O'Farrell, one block south of Geary, running underground to Larkin Street; this routing was chosen to avoid potential interference with a future planned north/south subway route along Third and Kearny.

A later report in 1935 recommended a tunnel under Geary as well as subway routes under Market Street and Mission Street for removing operations from the surface. The Geary route included 2.5 miles (4.0 km) of tunnel under Geary Street starting at Hamilton Square in the west, turning north under Montgomery Street and surfacing at Washington Street onto Columbus Avenue — it would have connected with existing surface tracks at its ends. This route was projected to cost between $13.6 million and $16 million (between $312 million to $367 million in 2024 adjusted for inflation). A further study in 1936 by Ridgeway and Bradhey also identified Geary as a preferred subway route. Voters suffering from the Great Depression did not have a desire for such a municipal expenditure.

A report prepared for the City Planning Department in 1950 outlined plans for rapid transit lines in San Francisco and included a Geary Line.

=== Marin Line of Bay Area Rapid Transit ===
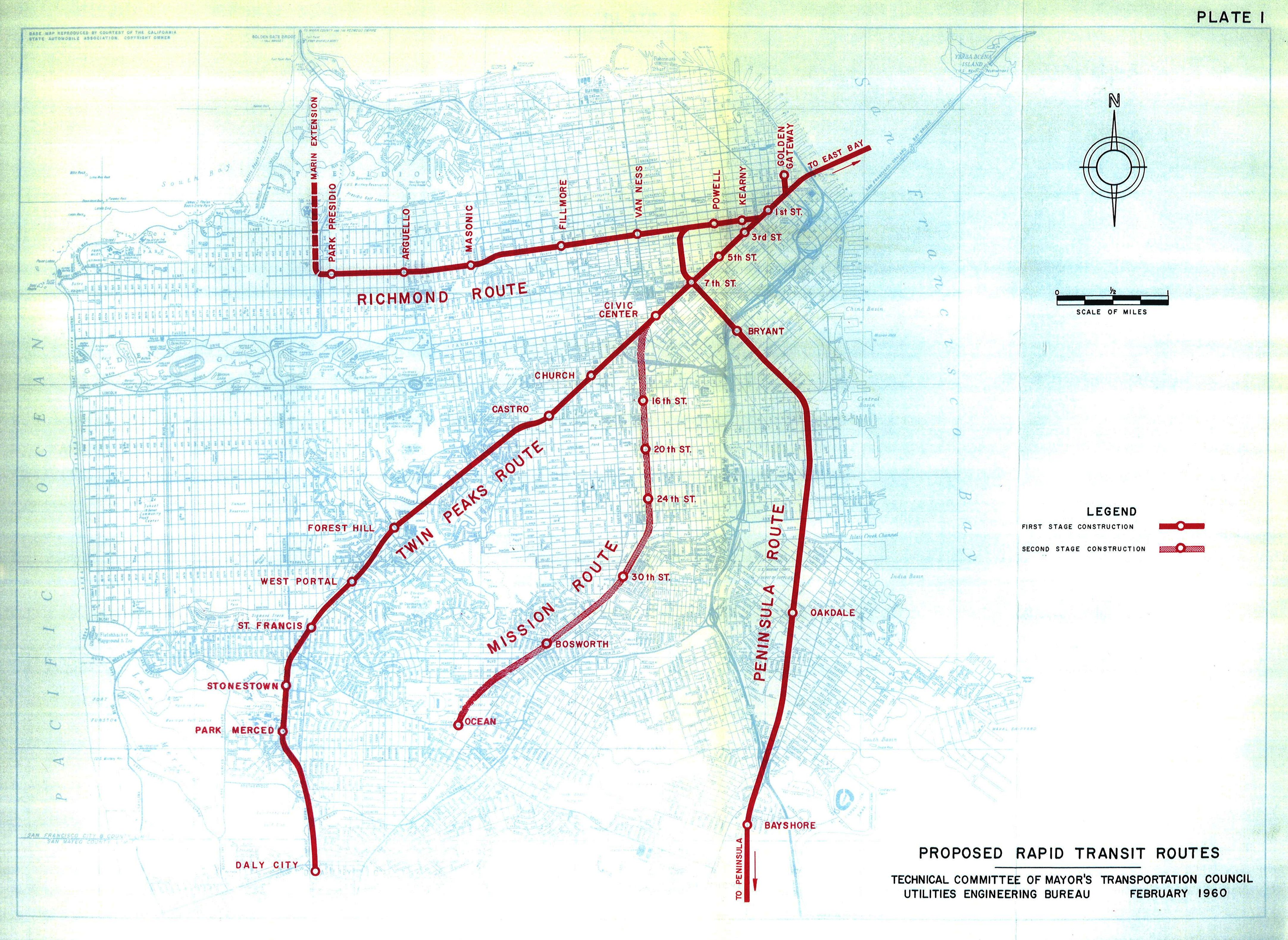
Envisioned master plan for rapid transit in San Francisco. Bay Area Rapid Transit initially intended to establish additional routes in the city. This map from 1960 included a Geary Subway.

As a precursor to full Bay Area Rapid Transit (BART) planning, a Geary Subway was once again studied in 1960 as the connection into Marin County. The tunnel was expected to run from Market and Montgomery to Park Presidio Boulevard before turning north to California Street in anticipation of an extension to Marin.

As designs for the BART system were being finalized, the Marin Line was intended to begin Downtown and run under Post Street before turning north to run across the Golden Gate Bridge. The subway tunnel would connect to the trunk line under Market Street near Montgomery Street, running west and briefly surfacing near Maple Street and Post before entering another tunnel in the Presidio of San Francisco. When Marin County pulled out of the transit district, some plans called for a subway only extending to the Richmond District, but these were soon scrapped.

=== One of the Four Corridors ===
In 1989, the city of San Francisco approved Proposition B, a ballot measure that approved a half-cent sales tax for transportation. The expenditure scheme that was included in the proposition prioritized the planning and implementation of transit expansion along four transit corridors, including Geary Boulevard. Subsequently, the San Francisco County Transportation Authority (SFCTA) conducted a study, titled the Four Corridor Plan, to determine the details of the transportation improvements along the corridors outlined in Proposition B. The study called for a subway-surface rail line along Geary, running on the surface as far east as Laguna Street and underground to either the Financial District or South of Market. When the tax was extended in the early 2000s, the project was changed to focus on implementing bus rapid transit features along the corridor. Dedicated bus lanes were opened along Geary as a result of COVID-19 pandemic service changes in early 2021.

=== New BART plans ===
In 1995, the San Francisco Municipal Railway hired Merrill & Associates to study the possibility of building a new BART subway beneath Geary in conjunction with adding light rail on the surface. The estimated cost of construction as far as Park Presidio Boulevard was $1.4 billion in 1995 ($2.89 billion in 2024 adjusted for inflation). Projections from this study put BART ridership at 18,000 daily boardings, and the alignment would allow for a further extension to Marin. These plans were dropped, according to former Senator Quentin L. Kopp, due to merchant and resident opposition, citing potential blight similar to that caused by Market Street subway construction two decades earlier.

Ongoing studies will determine whether the corridor may one day be served by future BART service. A Geary Subway may be constructed as an extension of the second Transbay Tube.

=== Geary/19th Avenue Corridor ===
On-line and in-person outreach indicated the public felt a subway along Geary was the system's most needed improvement. A new study was undertaken after the 2021 ConnectSF Transit Strategy plan was released, proposing a new rail route to connect Downtown and Daly City via Geary and 19th Avenue; projected daily ridership across the Muni Metro would increase to 300,000 with the new route, with a preliminary cost estimate of US$20 billion.
