= Geary Street, Park and Ocean Railway =

Street railway company in San Francisco

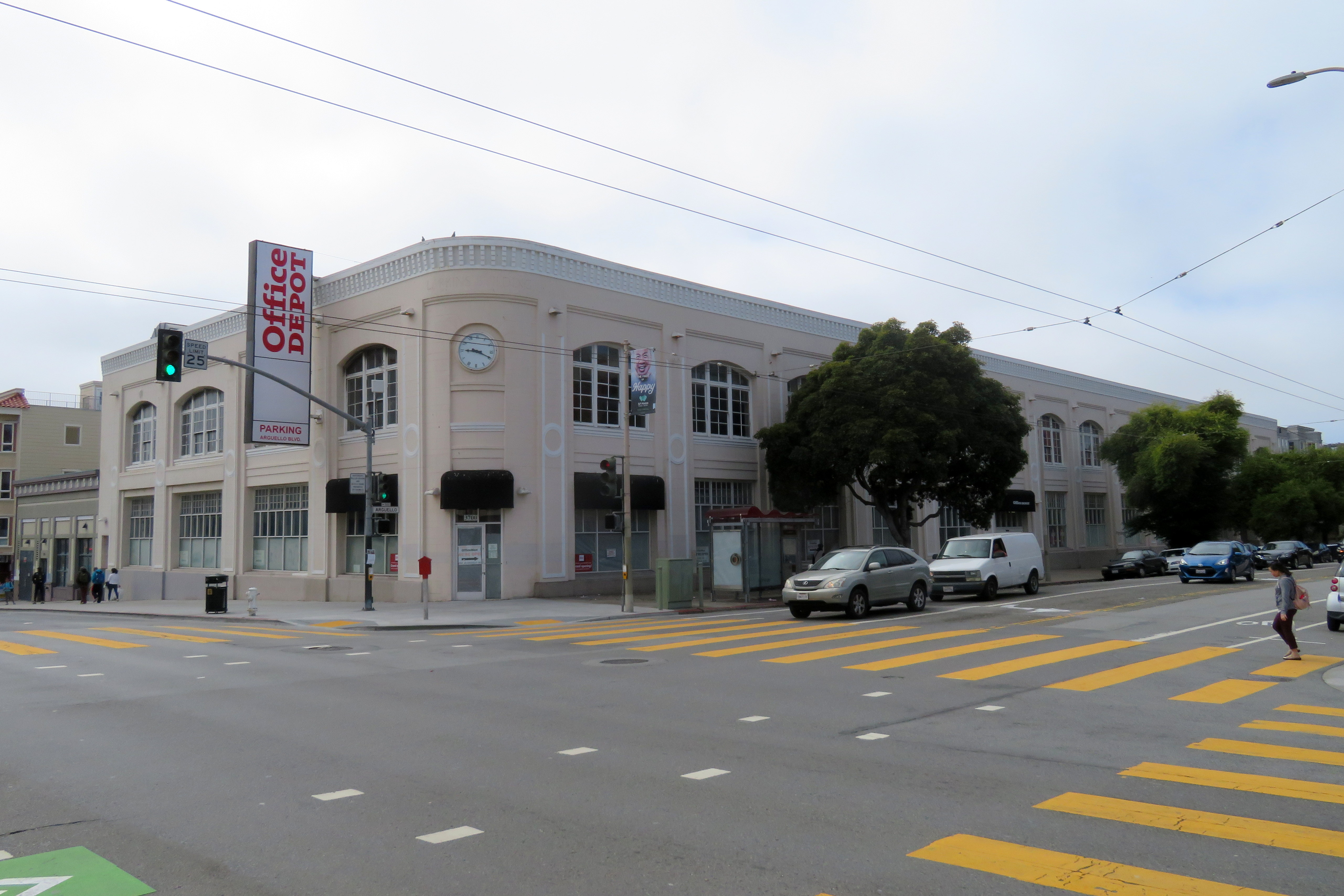
- The former carbarn at Arguello Street in 2018

Overview
- Locale: San Francisco, California
- Transit type: cable cars

Operation
- Began operation: February 16, 1880
- Ended operation: May 5, 1912
- Operators: Geary Street, Park & Ocean Railway (1880–1887), Market Street Railway (1887–1912), San Francisco Municipal Transportation Agency (1912–present)

Technical
- Track gauge: 4 ft 8 1/2 in (1,435 mm)
- Old gauge: 5 ft (1,524 mm) until 1892

The Geary Street, Park and Ocean Railway was a street railway in San Francisco, California, United States.

== History ==
Geary Street Cable-Road, San Francisco, The Resources of California, June 1883

The company received a franchise from the city to operate a cable railway on November 6, 1878. Operations commenced on February 16, 1880 as a 5 ft (1,524 mm) gauge railway. Cable cars operated from the ferries to Geary Boulevard and Central Avenue (later Presidio Avenue) where passengers transferred to trains pulled by steam dummy locomotives, terminating at 5th and Fulton via 1st Street. The route soon proved quite popular. The line was purchased by the Market Street Railway in 1887; operations were not consolidated as Market Street Railway did not own all of the outstanding stock in the Geary Street railway. The line was converted to standard gauge and the cars were reworked to utilize a Market Street Railway's usual side-grip mechanism in 1892. The steam line was also rebuilt for cable traction at this time.

The company's operating franchise expired in November 1903, but it continued to operate and pay its fees to the city. Following the 1906 San Francisco earthquake, cars had actually operated in the few hours immediately following the tremor but were stopped until June due to damage at the power house. The company's operating permit was restored in 1907. In 1912, the city declined to renew the franchise and instead took over the right of way. The last day of cable operations by the Geary Street, Park and Ocean Railway was on May 5, 1912.

The line was rebuilt into an electric streetcar line, forming the first element of the San Francisco Municipal Railway (Muni) that was to become synonymous with transit in that city. Streetcar service on the new B-Geary line began on December 28, 1912, based out of a carhouse at Geary and Presidio Streets. Muni replaced the street cars with motor coaches in 1956, and the 38 Geary remains one of Muni's busiest bus routes, serving over 40,000 passengers per weekday. (Note: As of June 2024, including the 38-Geary and 38R-Geary Rapid routes)

== Infrastructure ==
Cars terminated downtown at Geary, Market, and Kearny Streets. The powerhouse was in a two-story wooden building on the northwest corner of Geary Boulevard and Buchanan Street. The car barn was in a building on the northwest corner of Geary Boulevard and Arguello Boulevard, later an Office Max store.

== Rolling stock ==
Baldwin Locomotive Works built four 0-4-0 tank locomotives for the line. Numbers 1 and 3 (C/N 4801 & 4817) had vertical boilers while numbers 2 and 4 (C/N 4827 & 5115) had more conventional horizontal boilers. The two locomotives with horizontal boilers were sold to redwood logging railroads when line was converted to cable car operation on August 7, 1892. Locomotive #2 became #6 for Hobbs, Wall & Company of Crescent City, California; and #4 was sent to the Glen Blair Redwood Company on the California Western Railroad.

== See also ==
- 38 Geary
- San Francisco cable car system
- List of defunct San Francisco Municipal Railway lines
