= 38 Geary =

San Francisco bus route

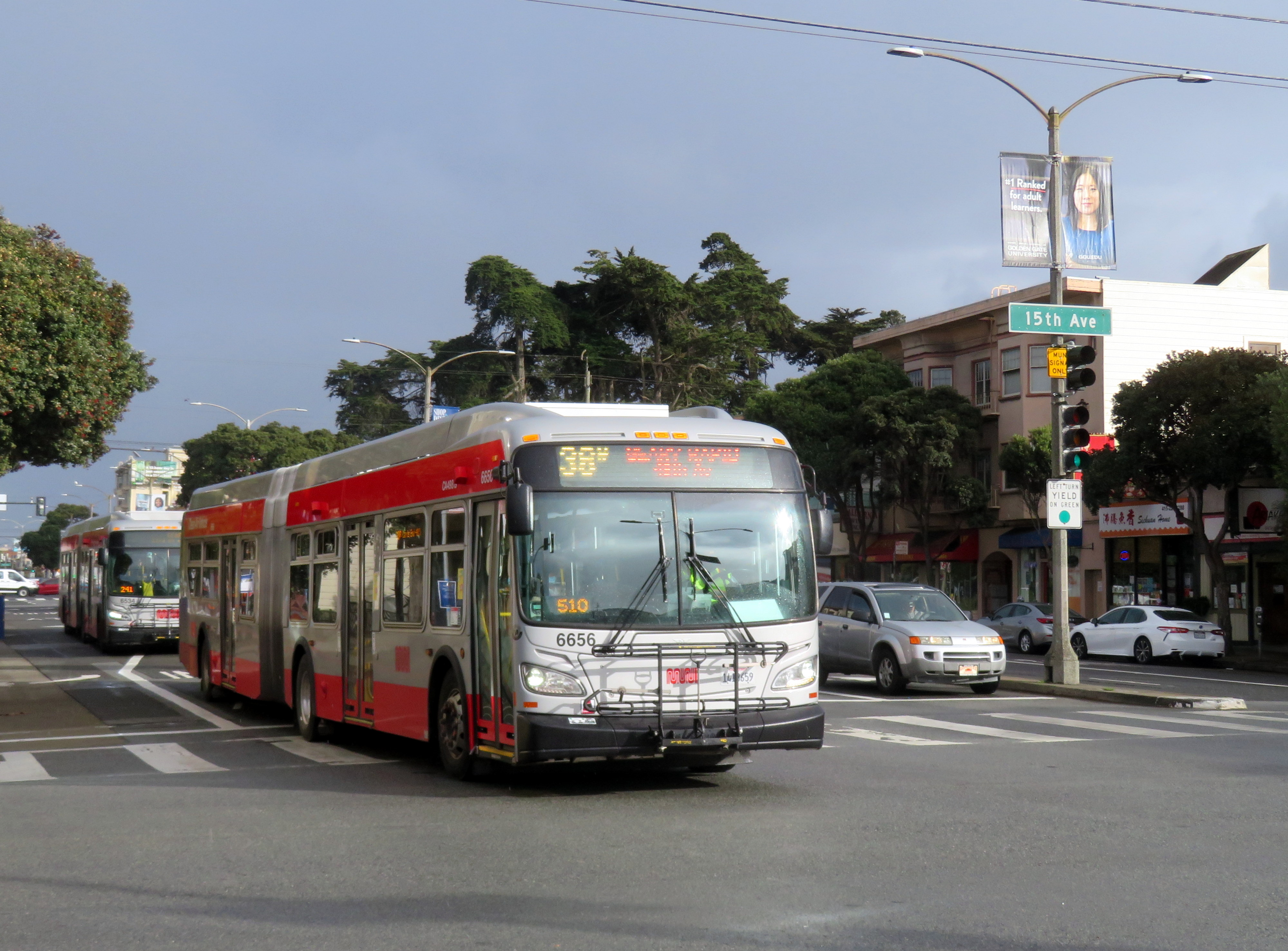
- 38R Geary Rapid bus in the Richmond District in 2021

Overview
- Operator: San Francisco Municipal Railway
- Vehicle: New Flyer XDE60
- Began service: December 29, 1956
- Predecessors: B Geary, C Geary–California

Route
- Locale: San Francisco, California
- Start: Salesforce Transit Center
- Via: Geary Boulevard
- End: 32nd Avenue and Balboa (daytime) Fort Miley Hospital (daytime) 48th Avenue and Point Lobos (evenings/Sunday)
- Length: 6.5 miles (10.5 km)
- Other routes: 38R, 38AX, 38BX

Service
- Frequency: 8–10m
- Weekend frequency: 10m
- Daily ridership: 38: 21,500 (2019); 38R: 29,500 (2019)
- Map: 38 Geary / 38R Geary Rapid Map

38 Geary is a bus line operated by the San Francisco Municipal Railway (Muni). Together with the limited service routes that share the number, the 38R Geary Rapid, 38AX Geary 'A' Express, and 38BX Geary 'B' Express, the Geary Boulevard corridor makes up Muni's busiest thoroughfare.

== Route description ==
The route operates between the Salesforce Transit Center and the Richmond District almost exclusively via Geary Boulevard. Much of the route features side-running bus lanes to speed travel times. The route operates 24 hours with less frequent Owl service overnight as part of the All Nighter network.

=== 38R Geary Rapid ===
The 38R Geary Rapid skips several stops along the route east of 33rd Avenue in order to provide a faster service through the corridor. The line has previously been known as the 38 Limited. Ridership just on this line was 29,500 daily boardings in 2019 — higher than the local line.

=== 38AX / 38BX Geary Express services ===
Geary is additionally served by two special express bus services. Both lines originate inbound at Davis Street and Pine Street near Embarcadero station and reach Geary Boulevard via Pine Street with only a few stops in the Financial District. Inbound trips run on Bush Street and California Street. The 38AX Geary 'A' Express continues nonstop to Masonic Avenue and Geary Avenue until 25th Avenue where it begins making local stops until terminating at 48th Avenue. The 38BX Geary 'B' Express turns off Pine at Presidio Avenue and makes local stops on Geary between Presidio and 25th. Buses run during peak hours on weekdays. Express buses were suspended during the COVID-19 pandemic.

== History ==
The Geary Street, Park and Ocean Railway began operating cable cars on Geary starting in 1880. San Francisco Municipal Railway (Muni) acquired the corridor as its first streetcar line, opening in 1912. Service was initially provided by the A Geary–10th Avenue, B Geary, and C Geary–California. The A was reduced to a shuttle service in June 1913 and the B Geary, itself previously a shuttle between 10th and 33rd Avenues, was lengthened to run from Downtown to the beach. Rail service was replaced with buses on December 29, 1956, with the B Geary becoming the 38 Geary.

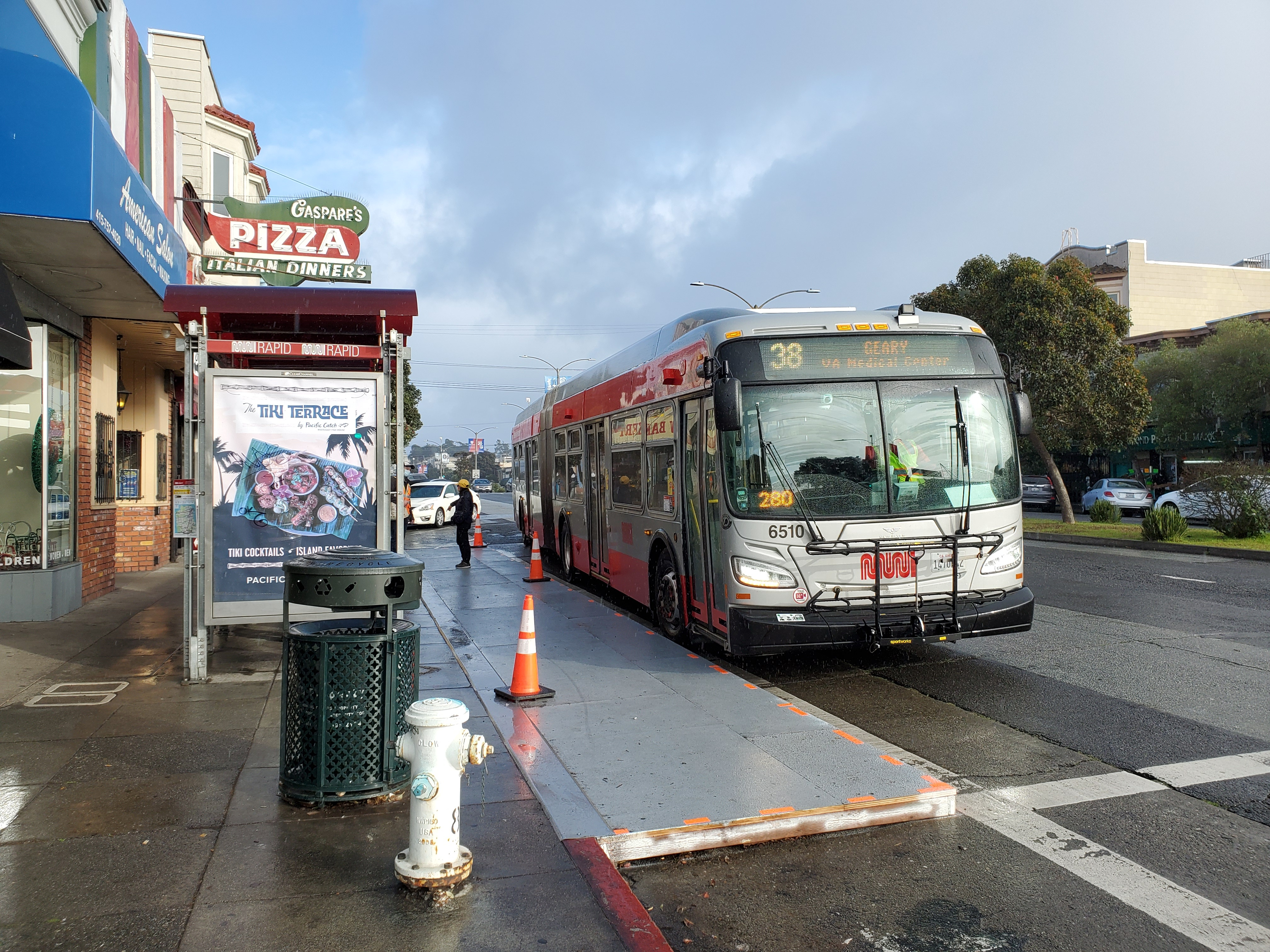
Temporary bus bulb constructed as a precursor to the Geary Bus Rapid Transit project, January 2021

During construction of the Salesforce Transit Center, the inbound terminus was moved to the Temporary Transbay Terminal. Much of the Geary Bus Rapid Transit project was implemented between 2019 and 2021. Part of the final design was influenced by emergency measures made in response to the COVID-19 pandemic.

== Ridership ==
By 2014, over 54,000 daily trips were made along the corridor, more than the entirety of Caltrain. This makes it one of the most heavily ridden bus lines in North America, slightly behind Vancouver's 99 B-Line, which has the highest ridership of any bus line in America north of Mexico.

== See also ==
- Geary Subway
