= Geary Boulevard =

Thoroughfare in San Francisco, United States

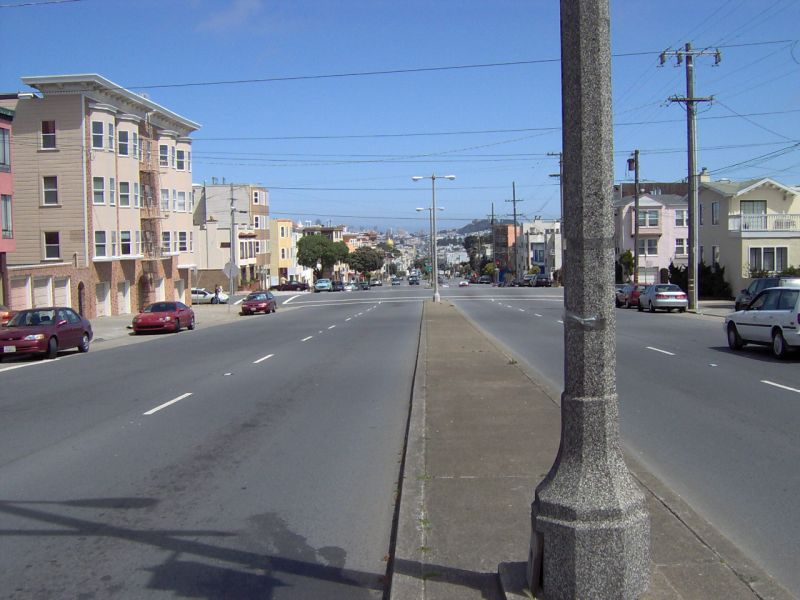
- Geary Boulevard, looking eastbound at 36th Avenue, in a residential part of the Richmond District
- Interactive map of Geary Boulevard
- Namesake: John W. Geary
- Length: 5.8 mi (9.3 km)
- Location: San Francisco
- East end: Kearny Street
- West end: 48th Avenue

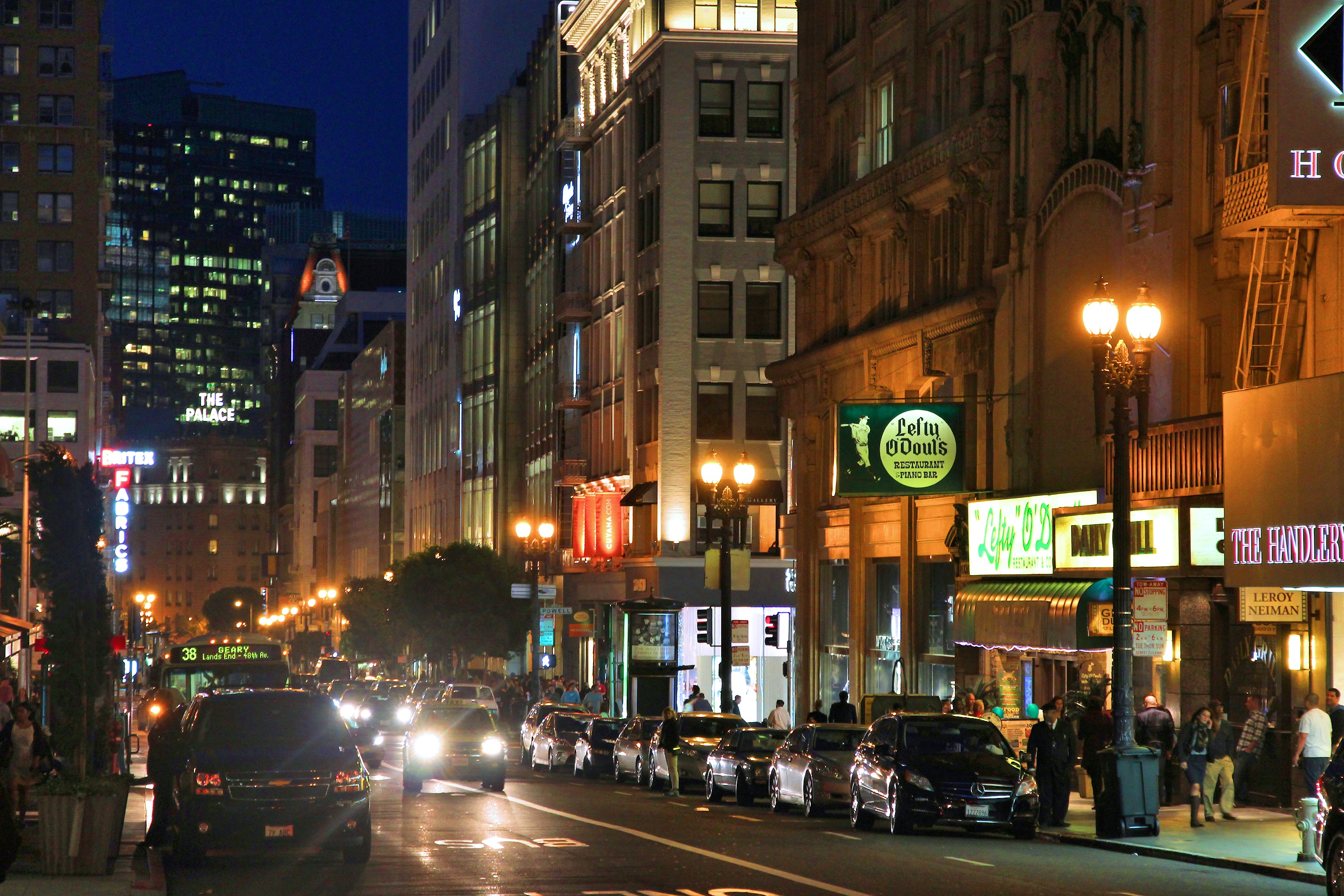
Geary Street in downtown San Francisco

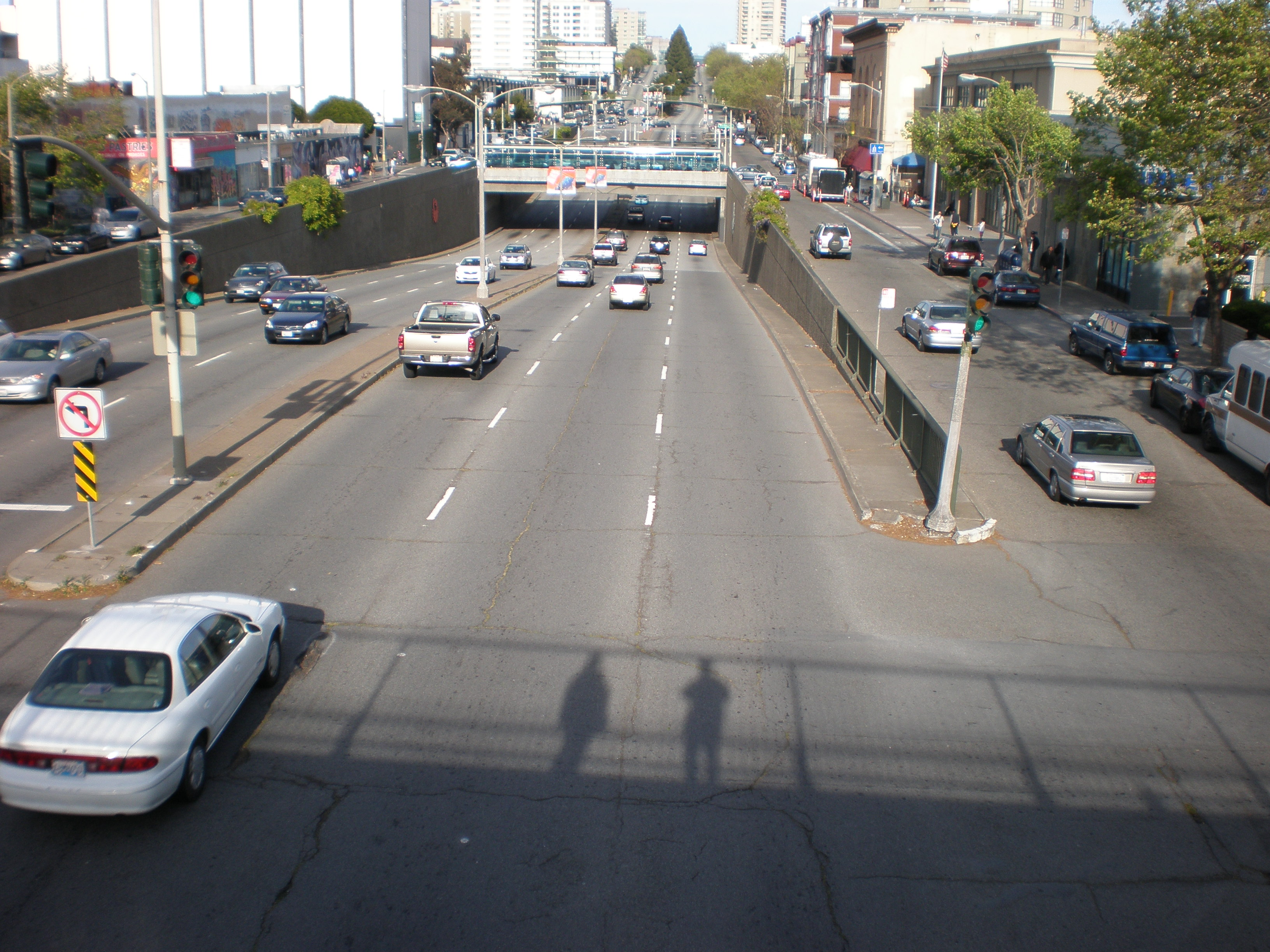
Looking east from the (now removed) Steiner Street pedestrian overpass

Geary Boulevard (designated as Geary Street east of Van Ness Avenue) is a major east–west 5.8-mile-long (9 km) thoroughfare in San Francisco, California, United States, beginning downtown at Market Street near Market Street's intersection with Kearny Street, and running westbound through downtown, the Civic Center area, the Western Addition, and running for most of its length through the predominantly residential Richmond District. Geary Boulevard terminates near Sutro Heights Park at 48th Avenue, close to the Cliff House above Ocean Beach at the Pacific Ocean. At 42nd Avenue, Geary intersects with Point Lobos Avenue, which takes through traffic to the Cliff House, Ocean Beach and the Great Highway. It is a major commercial artery through the Richmond District; it is lined with stores and restaurants, many of them catering to the various immigrant groups (Chinese, Russian, and Irish, among many others) who live in the area. The boulevard borders Japantown between Fillmore and Laguna Streets.

Geary Boulevard carries two-way traffic for most of its route, but the segment east of Gough Street carries only westbound traffic; at Gough, eastbound traffic is diverted by a short curved street, Starr King Way, onto O'Farrell Street, which runs parallel to Geary until it reaches Market Street.

The roadway was originally called Point Lobos Avenue, a name which survives as a branch and extension of the current street. The modern name pays tribute to John W. Geary, the first mayor of San Francisco after California became a U.S. state. (Later, he also had the unique distinction of serving as governor of both Kansas and Pennsylvania.)

Geary Boulevard also has the highest address and block numbers in San Francisco, with the highest address being 8344. In addition, although it is unsigned and contains no habitable structures, the city's GIS database records the underpass of Masonic Avenue as the 8400 block.

== History ==
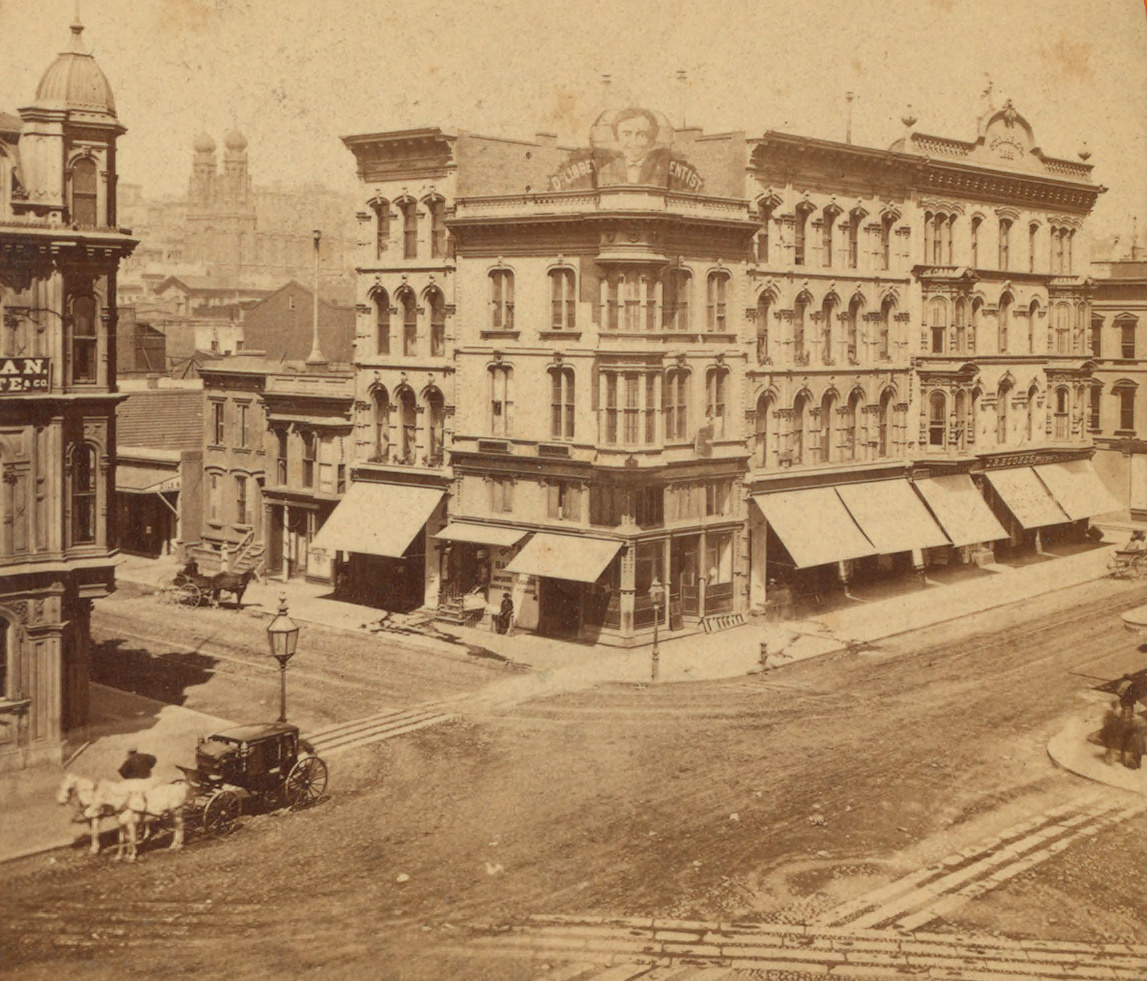
Geary and Kearny after 1860 but before the installation of streetcar lines

The right-of-way began as a dirt carriage track to the Cliff House and Ocean Beach, two popular local attractions. For a time, a flat track paralleled the road where horsemen raced their mounts on Sundays.

Cable cars were operated on the street from 1880 to 1912 by the Geary Street, Park and Ocean Railway. They initially ran from Market Street to Central (now Presidio), connecting to an extension running steam-powered cars along Geary to 1st Avenue (now Arguello), whereupon they turned south to approach Golden Gate Park. In 1892, the cable car line was extended to 5th Avenue, where it turned south to reach Golden Gate Park directly. Despite its name, the Geary Street Park & Ocean Railway never actually reached the ocean.

From 1912, when the San Francisco Municipal Railway began service, until 1956, when redevelopment projects led by Justin Herman (of the San Francisco Redevelopment Agency) included their removal and replacement with buses, the A Geary-10th Avenue, B Geary, C Geary-California, and D Geary-Van Ness lines all ran along Geary from Market Street to 10th Avenue, 33rd Avenue, 2nd Avenue, and Van Ness Avenue, respectively. The B Geary line eventually reached Playland and Ocean Beach after turning south at 33rd Avenue and then west on Balboa Avenue. At 33rd Avenue, streetcars of the Market Street Railway came down from Clement Street and continued along to the end of Geary at 48th Avenue where they turned north and entered a private right of way at Point Lobos Avenue to reach a car barn at Sutro Baths. This made the entire length of Geary from Market Street to 48th served by streetcars.

Muni bus service along Geary Boulevard is provided by the 38 Geary bus line, which is the most heavily used bus line in the city with over 50,000 passengers per day, and over 100,000 passengers per day in adjacent lines (1 California, 2 Clement, 31 Balboa).

The section of the boulevard between Laguna and Divisadero Streets, passing through the Western Addition neighborhood, was widened in 1961, resulting in the demolition and displacement of residences and businesses in the corridor. It features between four and eight through lanes and two grade separations at Masonic and Fillmore, complete with frontage lanes. There is a pedestrian overpass in the Japantown neighborhood at Webster Street; an additional overpass at Steiner Street was demolished in 2020.

== Bus rapid transit ==
Side running bus-only lanes were added to Geary Boulevard in the early 2020s, between Market Street and 34th Ave. There have been feasibility studies by Muni that have investigated the possibility of creating a light rail or subway line on Geary, but no plans have been adopted.

== See also ==
- The McLoughlin Gallery, a contemporary art gallery at 49 Geary Street
- Girls High School (San Francisco), at Geary and Scott Street, succeeded by Benjamin Franklin Junior High School, 1952
