= List of defunct San Francisco Municipal Railway lines =

The San Francisco Municipal Railway (Muni) is the public transit system for San Francisco, California. Several bus, trolleybus, streetcar/light rail, and cable car routes were historically served, but have been discontinued. It began service on December 28, 1912, with two streetcar routes on Geary Boulevard and continued to expand operations. In 1944, the city acquired the largest remaining private transit agency in San Francisco, the Market Street Railway, and began operating its former services. Many modern routes are amalgamated from earlier lines, while some corridors no longer see regular Muni service.

== Defunct bus lines ==
This is a listing of all the Local, Rapid, Express, and streetcar lines that once operated throughout San Francisco, but are now defunct.

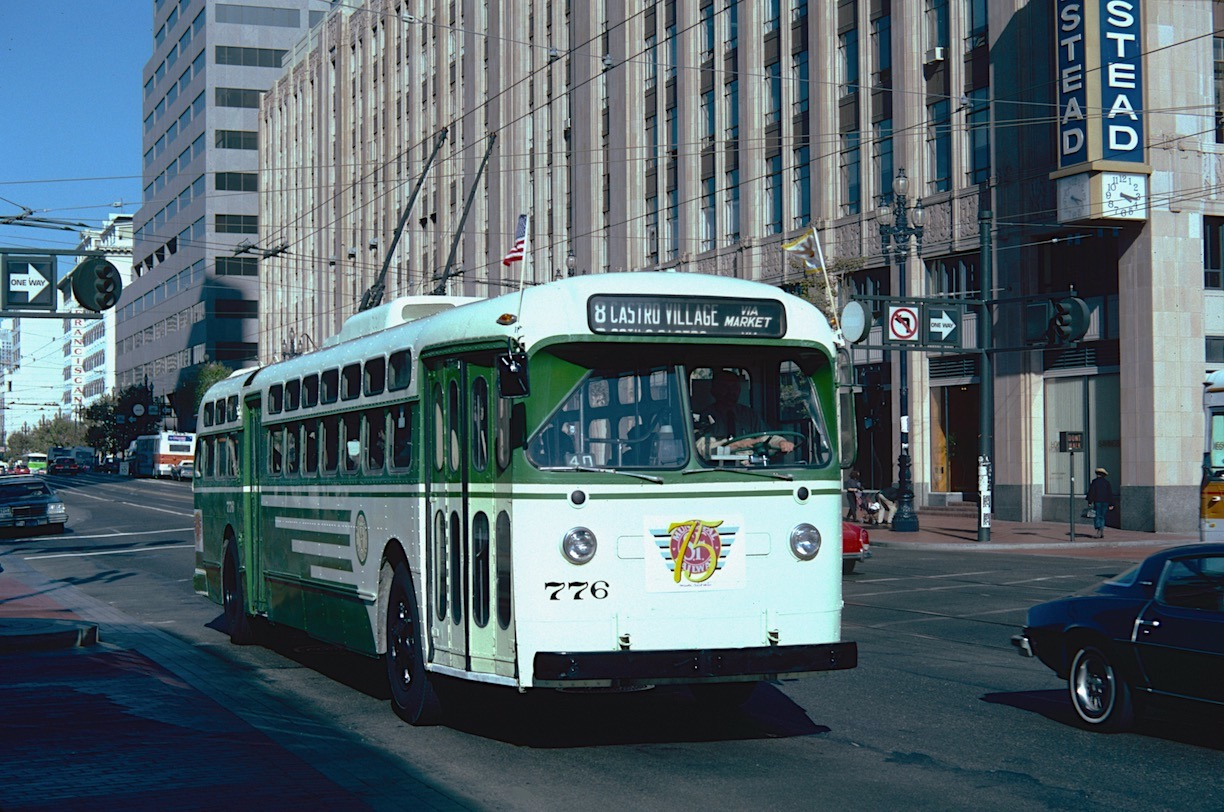
1950 Muni trolley coach 776 serving the 8 Market line on Market Street at 10th during the 1987 San Francisco Historic Trolley Festival.

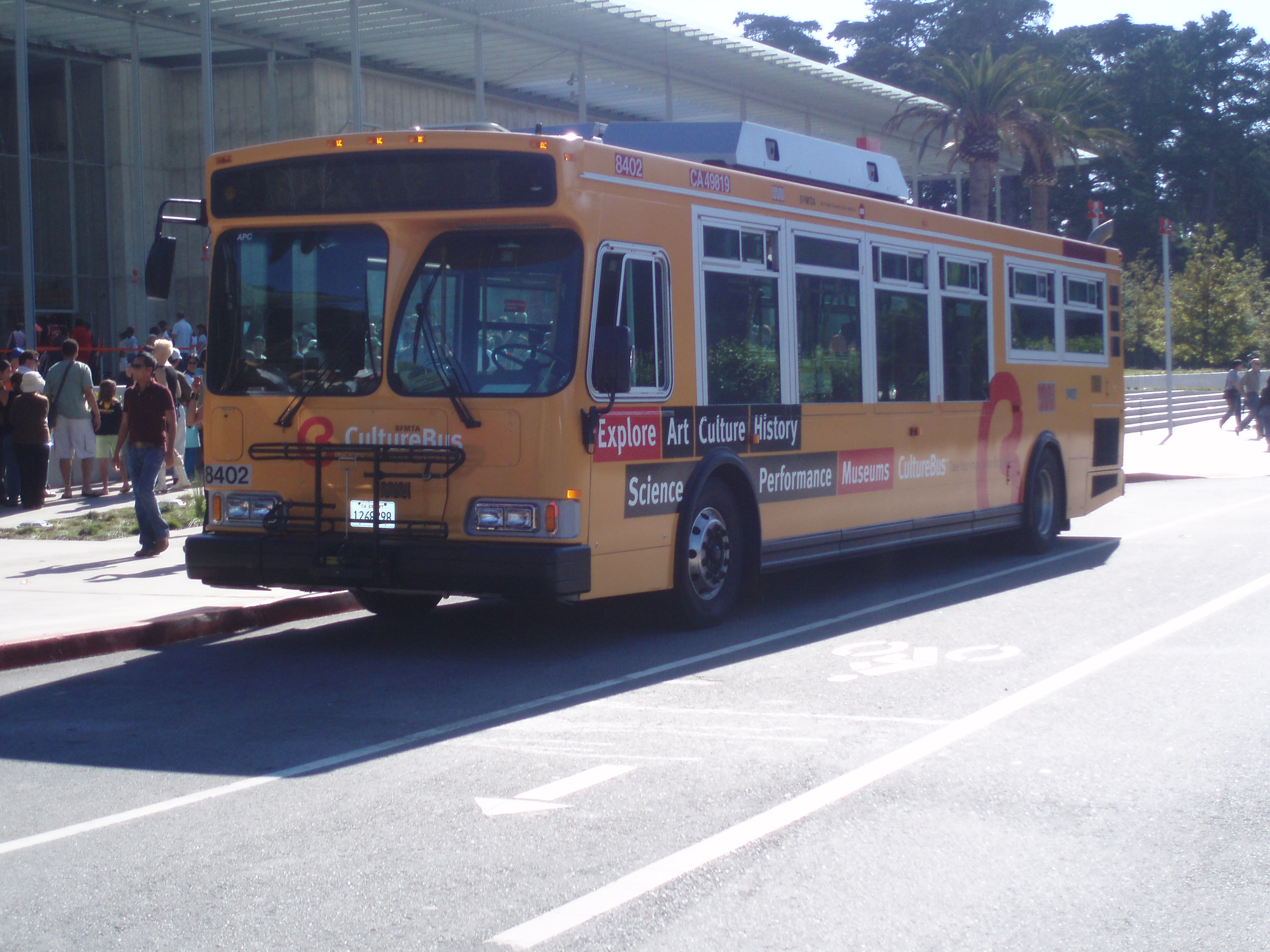
74X Culture Bus in special livery, October 2008.

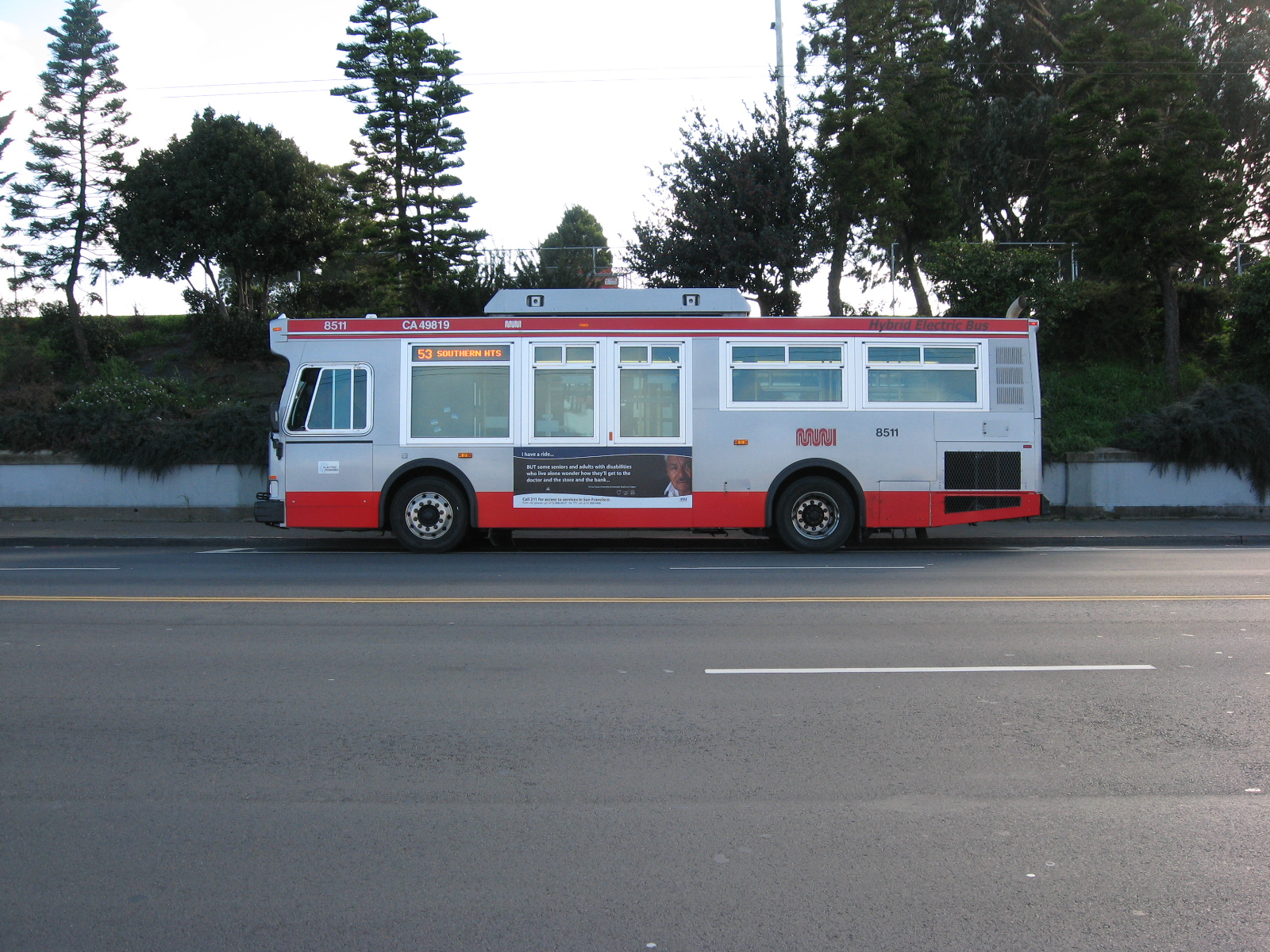
The 53 Southern Heights was served by short 30-foot (9.1 m) buses, seen here in January 2008.

Key
*	Weekday peak hours only
^	Articulated bus (60 ft.)
♦	Community bus (30 ft.)
(TC)	Trolleybus

=== Local lines ===
Line	Note	Inbound terminal	Outbound terminal	Reason for discontinuing	Areas served	Year started	Year discontinued
1 Westwood Park							
4 Sutter	(TC)*	Sutter Street & Sansome Street	6th Avenue & California Street	Low ridership; supplemented by 2 Clement re-routing. It was revived for a while when the 1 California moved to Sacramento St.; a truncated version to Presidio to be re-instated. The 2 Sutter trolleybus is its replacement.	Richmond District, Laurel Heights, Western Addition, Japantown, Union Square, Financial District	1948	2009
5 McAllister	(TC)	Transbay Terminal	La Playa and Balboa streets	Renamed 5 Fulton.	Financial District, Tenderloin, Civic Center, Western Addition, Alamo Square, University of San Francisco, Golden Gate Park, Richmond, Ocean Beach	1906	1948
7 Haight	(TC)*	Mission Street & Main Street	Haight Street & Stanyan Street	Low ridership; 71 Haight/Noriega was renumbered to 7 Haight/Noriega in 2015.	Haight-Ashbury, Haight-Fillmore, Market Street, Civic Center, Financial District	1948	2009
8 Market	(TC)	Ferry Building	Collingwood & 19th Streets	Replaced by F Market and subsequently by F Market & Wharves; 9X Bayshore Express was renumbered to 8X Bayshore Express.	The Embarcadero, Market Street, Financial District, Civic Center, The Castro	1945	1995
8 Seventeenth Avenue		17th & Judah	15th & Taraval				
9 Richland	(TC)	Ferry Building	Richland & Andover	Part combined with parts of 13 Ellsworth and 23 Crescent to form 67 Bernal Heights; rest replaced by 26 Valencia (portions replaced by 29 Sunset in 1982)	South of Market, Mission District, Bernal Heights	1949	1983
10 Monterey		10th Ave & California	Bayshore & Hilton	Replaced by 23-Monterey and 43-Masonic.	Richmond, Golden Gate Park, Inner Sunset, Glen Park, Bernal Heights		
11 Telegraph Hill		Union & Montgomery	Coit Tower			1939	
11 Hoffman		Ferry Building	24th & Douglass via Forest Hill station	Replaced by 13 Guerrero and 48 Quintara/24th Street	South of Market, Mission District, Noe Valley, Diamond Heights, Forest Hill	1948	1983
12 Mission/Ocean	(TC)	Ferry Building	Ocean & Phelan	Replaced by 49 Van Ness/Mission	South of Market, Mission District, Bernal Heights, Excelsior, Balboa Park	1948	1983
13 Ellsworth		Crescent & Putnam	Richland & Mission	Combined with parts of 9 Richland and 23 Crescent to form 67 Bernal Heights.	Bernal Heights	1970	1983
13 Guerrero		Ferry Building	Clipper & Grandview	Duplicated service on J Church and 48 Quintara.	South of Market, Mission District, Noe Valley	1983	1988
14 Roosevelt				Renamed 43 Roosevelt			1949
15 Third Street	^	Kearny & Bay Streets	City College	Replaced by T Third Street and 9X Bayshore Express (now 8 Bayshore); and later 15 Bayview Hunters Point Express	Fisherman's Wharf, Chinatown, Union Square, Mission Bay, Dogpatch, Islais Creek, Bayview/Hunters Point, Visitacion Valley	1941	2007
16 Kearny/Third Street				Replaced by 15 Third Street (now T Third Street)		1941	1946
16 Noriega		5th St & Market	48th Avenue and Ortega	Portions merged with the 28 19th Avenue, 71 (now 7) Haight-Noriega.	Downtown San Francisco, Hayes Valley, Western Addition, Richmond, Sunset		
17 Parkmerced	♦	West Portal Station	Arballo and Acevedo	Renamed 57 Parkmerced. Note that there was an earlier 57 Parkmerced that merged into the 17 Parkmerced, as shown on roll signs.	West Portal, Stonestown Galleria, Parkmerced		2015
20 Ellis				Split into 71 Haight-Noriega (now 7 Haight-Noriega) and 72 Haight-Sunset (now part of 29 Sunset)		1947	1951
20 Columbus	(TC) Midday hours only	Beale Street & Howard Street	Van Ness Avenue & North Point Street	Low ridership; replaced by 41 Union; there was an earlier 20 Columbus, shown on rollsigns.	Financial District, Fisherman's Wharf, North Beach, Chinatown, Financial District, South of Market	2007	2009
20 Candlestick Cove		Gillet & Lathrop	Blythdale & Brookdale	Combined With 29 Visitacion	Visitacion Valley	1973	1974
23 Crescent		24th & Mission	Putnam & Crescent	Combined with parts of 9 Richland and 13 Ellsworth to form 67 Bernal Heights	Mission District, Bernal Heights	1940	1983
25 Bryant		Jackson & Fillmore	Geneva & Santos	Replaced by 9 San Bruno and rest merged with 27 Noe to form 27 Bryant.	Pacific Heights, Nob Hill, Tenderloin, Union Square, South of Market, Mission District, Portola, Visitacion Valley, Sunnydale	1949	1983
25 Stanyan				Renamed 33 Stanyan (Now 33 Ashbury/18th Street).		1983	
26 Valencia		Mission Street & 5th Street	Balboa Park Station, San Francisco State University	Low ridership.	South of Market, Mission District, Glen Park, Balboa Park	1945	2009
27 Noe							
29 Visitacion		Mansell & Hamilton	Gillette & Lathrop	Replaced by 56 Rutland.	Visitacion Valley	1948	1980
32 Embarcadero		Hyde & Jefferson Streets	Ferry Building, Caltrain Depot	Replaced by E Embarcadero (defunct from 1998 to 2015) and subsequently by F Market & Wharves and N Judah.	Fisherman's Wharf, Ferry Building, The Embarcadero	1927	2000
34 Woodside		Myra & Dalewood	Forest Hill Station	Merged into 36 Teresita.	Mount Davidson, Miraloma Park, Midtown Terrace, Forest Hill	1961	
34/36 Woodside/Teresita				Combination of Lines 34 and 36; renamed 36 Teresita.			
35 Howard				Replaced by the R Howard trolleybus.			1941
36 Folsom		Ferry Building	Precita Park	Low ridership.	Bernal Heights, Mission District, SoMa, and Ferry Plaza.	1896	1945
36 Miraloma							
36/52 Special	♦	Forest Hill station		Split into 36 Teresita and 52 Excelsior.	Glen Park, San Francisco, Sunnyside, San Francisco, California, Midtown Terrace, and Miraloma.	2021	
38 Bay Shore				Replaced by 25 Bryant		1949	
40 Commuter		Fourth & King /(Caltrain Fourth & King)	Second & Stevenson	Merged Into 10 Townsend			1980
41 Union/Howard	(TC)	Lyon and Greenwich streets	South Van Ness and Cesar Chavez	Renamed 41 Union; it splits in two with the portion north of Howard remaining the 41 and the southern portion becoming the 12 Folsom/Pacific.	Cow Hollow, Russian Hill, Washington Square, Financial District, SoMa, Mission District.	1949	1970
42 Evans				Merged into 19 Polk.		1945	1980
42 Downtown Loop		Caltrain Depot		Split into 47 Van Ness and 10 Townsend to improve service in South of Market.	Financial District, Caltrain Depot, South of Market, Nob Hill, Fisherman's Wharf, Levi Plaza	1980	2001
43 Roosevelt				Partially replaced by 37 Corbett and rest extended and renamed 43 Masonic.	Letterman Hospital, Kaiser Hospital, University of California, San Francisco Medical Center, St. Joseph's Hospital	1949	1980
44 Sansome						1945	1954
44 Diamond Heights				Replaced by 52 Excelsior		1971	1980
45 Greenwich				Replaced by 45 Union–Van Ness trolleybus		1950	1982
45 Union–Van Ness	(TC)			Replaced by 45 Union/Stockton		1982	1988
50 Crocker-Amazon				Replaced by 43 Masonic		1926	1980
51 Silver		Kirkwood & Earl	Bosworth & Diamond (Glen Park Station) (Weekdays) / Mission & Silver (Weekends and holidays)	Replaced by 44 O'Shaughnessy	Glen Park, Excelsior District, Portola, Silver Terrace, Bayview-Hunters Point	1927	1980
53 Southern Heights	♦	16th Street & Mission Street; 16th Street Mission Station; Weekdays; 16th Street & Bryant Street; Weekends	Connecticut Street & 18th Street	Low ridership.	Mission District, Potrero Hill	1932	2009
54 Williams	♦	Bacon & Goettingen	Ingalls & Revere			1977	1982
54 Hunters Point		Third & Evans	Boalt & Galvez				by 1950
55 Sacramento		Howard & Main Streets	6th Avenue & Clement Street	Electrified and merged with 1 California.	Financial District, Chinatown, Nob Hill, Richmond, Laurel Heights	1942	1982
55 16th Street		3rd Street & Mission Bay Boulevard North	Mission & 16th Street	Route east of US 101 was replaced by 22 Fillmore in 2021; the remainder of the route merged with parts of 22's previous alignment to create 55 Dogpatch.	Potrero Hill, Mission District, Mission Bay	2015	2021
57 Fitzgerald							by 1950
58 Leavenworth				Operated during cable car reconstruction		1982	1984
69 Crissy Field					Downtown to Crissy Field during fireworks events		by 2000
70 Hunter's Point		Third	Hunter's Point			1944	1948
70 Northridge							by 1950
70 Lake Merced		Great Highway & John Muir	Daly City Station	Replaced by 17 Parkmerced and 18 46th Avenue.			
71 San Francisco Junior College		Ridgewood & Monterey	San Francisco Junior College			1946	
71 Haight-Noriega		Transbay Terminal	Ortega and 48th Ave.	Renamed 7 Haight/Noriega.	South of Market, Financial District, Civic Center, Lower Haight, Haight-Ashbury, Golden Gate Park, Sunset		2015
72 Haight/Sunset		Ferry Building (weekday peak) / 5th & Market (all other times)	19th & Winston (daytime) / Sunset & Lake Merced (mornings and evenings)	Replaced by 29 Sunset.		1951	1983
72 Sunset				Shown on rollsigns; eliminated as redundant with 29 Sunset.		1983	
73 Lincoln Way		5th and Market Streets	Sloat & Sunset Boulevards	Split into 71 (now 7) Haight-Noriega and 72 Haight-Sunset.	Financial District, Haight-Ashbury, Sunset District, Parkside		1991
74 Veterans Hospital		42nd & Clement	43rd & Fulton			1946	
74 King Tut Shuttle		De Young Museum	Cabrillo & Great Highway			1979	
75 Parklands Shuttle		Bay & Laguna	48th & Point Lobos	Subsidized by the National Park Service, ran two months for weekends and holidays.		1979	
75 Legion of Honor						1946	1954
76 Fort Cronkhite							
76 Broadmoor		San Jose Avenue & Flournoy	Broadmoor Village	Subsidy by developer discontinued.	Daly City	1949	1955
76 Marin Headlands		Caltrain Station	Fort Cronkhite	Renamed 76x Marin Headlands Express in 2012.	SoMa, Financial District, Nob Hill, Presidio, Golden Gate Bridge, Marin Headlands, and Fort Cronkhite.	1976	2012
77 Alemany							
77 Industrial		Alemany & Sickles	Industrial & Loomis			1950	1954
77 Brotherhood Way							
78 Golden Gate Park Shuttle	Sunday 10AM To 5:12PM Only	Frederick & Stanyan	Music Concourse	Low Ridership		1979	1980
79 Fort Mason		Hyde & North Point	Fort Mason	Ran two weeks in August.		1980	
79 Sunset Heights						1950	
80 Leavenworth				Replaced by 25 Bryant.		1951	1974
81 Bacon/Fitzgerald		Fitzgerald & Keith	Huron & Mission	Replaced by 29 Sunset and 54 Felton		1939	1982
82 Chinatown		Pacific & Kearny	4th & Folsom	Merged with present-day 8, 30, and 45 lines		1980s	
83 Pacific		Pacific & Van Ness Avenues	Battery Street & Pacific Avenue	Merged into 12 Folsom-Pacific.	Chinatown, Nob Hill	1979	2001
84 Shoppers' Shuttle						1966	
84 Marina					Downtown to Marina during firework events		by 2000
85 Shopper Shuttle							
88 Hospital Shuttle				Service absorbed by 10 Monterey		1970	1978
89 Laguna Honda	♦	Forest Hill Station	Laguna Honda Hospital	Low ridership.	Laguna Honda Hospital, Forest Hill		2009
91 Stonestown	Weekdays Only To 9PM	19th & Winston	Daly City BART	Redundant With 17 and 28	Stonestown	1975	1977
92 Balboa Park BART Shuttle	*	Balboa Park BART	Sloat & West Portal			1979	1980
99 BART Shuttle							
108 Treasure Island		Transbay Terminal	13th and Gateview; Treasure Island	Renamed 25 Treasure Island.	South of Market, Treasure Island		2015

=== Limited/Rapid lines ===
Line	Note	Inbound terminal	Outbound terminal	Reason for discontinuing	Areas served	Year started	Year discontinued
5L Fulton Limited	(TC)	Transbay Terminal	Cabrillo and La Playa	Renamed 5R Fulton Rapid.	Financial District, Tenderloin, Civic Center, Western Addition, Alamo Square, University of San Francisco, Golden Gate Park, Richmond, Ocean Beach		2015
7R Haight-Noriega Rapid	*	Transbay Terminal	Ortega and 48th Ave	Replaced by 7 Haight-Noriega local service on August 14, 2017.	South of Market, Embarcadero, Financial District, Union Square, Mid-Market, Tenderloin, Civic Center, Lower Haight, Haight-Ashbury, Golden Gate Park, Sunset	2015	2017
9L San Bruno Limited		Main and Mission	Bayshore and Arleta	Renamed 9R San Bruno Rapid.	Financial District, Civic Center, South of Market, Mission District, Portola, Visitacion Valley		2015
14L Mission Limited	^	Main and Mission	Mission and San Jose	Renamed 14R Mission Rapid.	Financial District, South of Market, Mission District, Bernal Heights, Excelsior, Crocker-Amazon, Daly City		2015
15L Third Street Limited	^	Kearny & Bay Streets	City College	Replaced by T Third Street and 9X Bayshore Express (now 8 Bayshore)	Fisherman's Wharf, Chinatown, Union Square, Mission Bay, Dogpatch, Islais Creek, Bayview/Hunters Point, Visitacion Valley		2007
28L 19th Avenue Limited		California and 6th Ave	Balboa Park BART	Renamed 28R 19th Avenue Rapid.	Marina, Richmond, Golden Gate Park, Sunset, Stonestown Galleria, Daly City		2015
38L Geary Limited	^	Transbay Terminal	Point Lobos and 48th Ave.	Renamed 38R Geary Rapid.	Financial District, Union Square, Tenderloin, Japantown, Western Addition, Anza Vista, Laurel Heights, Richmond		2015
66L Quintara Limited	♦	Ferry Building	Vicente Street & 30th Avenue	Replaced by 66 Quintara local service.	Parkside, Sunset District, Cole Valley, Haight-Ashbury, Lower Haight, Hayes Valley, Mid-Market, Market Street, Ferry Building		by 2000s
71L Haight-Noriega Limited		Transbay Terminal	Ortega and 48th Ave.	Renamed 7R Haight-Noriega Rapid.	South of Market, Financial District, Civic Center, Lower Haight, Haight-Ashbury, Golden Gate Park, Sunset	1951	2015

=== Express lines ===
Line	Note	Inbound terminus	Outbound terminus	Reason for discontinuing	Neighborhoods served	Year started	Year discontinued
8X Bayshore Express	^	Kearny and North Point	Phelan Loop	Renamed 8 Bayshore.	Fisherman's Wharf, North Beach, Chinatown, Financial District, South of Market, Portola, Visitacion Valley, Excelsior, Crocker-Amazon	2009	2015
9X Bayshore Express	^	Kearny and North Point	Phelan Loop	Renamed 8X Bayshore Express.	Fisherman's Wharf, North Beach, Chinatown, Financial District, South of Market, Portola, Visitacion Valley, Excelsior, Crocker-Amazon		2009
9AX Bayshore 'A' Express		Kearny and Pacific	Geneva and Schwerin	Renamed 8AX Bayshore 'A' Express.	North Beach, Chinatown, Financial District, South of Market, Portola, Visitacion Valley		2009
9BX Bayshore 'B' Express		Kearny and North Point	Phelan Loop	Renamed 8BX Bayshore 'B' Express.	Fisherman's Wharf, North Beach, Chinatown, Financial District, South of Market, Portola, Visitacion Valley, Excelsior, Crocker-Amazon		2009
15X Bayshore Express	^			Replaced by T Third Street.			2007
15AX Bayshore 'A' Express	^			Replaced by T Third Street.			2007
15BX Bayshore 'B' Express	^			Replaced by T Third Street.			2007
16X Noriega Express		Market Street & 4th Street	Ortega Street & 48th Avenue	Renamed 7X Noriega Express. A different 7X Noriega express went on a slightly different route, as shown on rollsigns.	Tenderloin, Civic Center, Golden Gate Park, Sunset	2009	2015
16AX Noriega 'A' Express		Market Street & 4th Street	Ortega Street & 48th Avenue	Combined with 16BX to become 16X. (now 7X)	Sunset District, Golden Gate Park, Civic Center, Tenderloin		2009
16BX Noriega 'B' Express		Market Street & 4th Street	Noriega Street & Sunset Boulevard	Combined with 16AX to become 16X. (now 7X)	Sunset District, Golden Gate Park, Civic Center, Tenderloin		2009
17X Parkmerced Express		John Muir Drive	Daly City BART	Merged into 88 BART Shuttle	Lake Merced, Parkmerced		
72X Sunset Express							
74X CultureBus		Howard & New Montgomery	Golden Gate Park	Low ridership.	SoMa, Golden Gate Park, Union Square	2008	2009
80X Gateway Express	*	4th and King (Caltrain Depot)	Sacramento and Battery	Replaced by 82X Levi Plaza Express.	Financial District, SoMa, South Beach, The East Cut		2013
82x Presidio & Wharves Express		Anza and Lincoin	4th and King (Caltrain Depot)	Renamed and truncated to create 82x Levi Plaza Express.	SoMa, Financial District, North Beach, Marina District, the Presidio.		2007
83X Mid-Market Express	♦*	9th Street and Market (Civic Center)	Townsend and 5th Street		Mid-Market, SoMa, Showplace Square, Mission Bay	2012	2020
87X Civic Center Express							

==== Candlestick Park lines ====
Through the end of 2013, the four Candlestick Express lines connected Candlestick Park with other points throughout the city. These lines ran before and after San Francisco 49ers games, while the 86 and 87 Candlestick Shuttles also ran during the game.

Line	Termini^{[a]}		Neighborhoods served	Links
75X Candlestick Express	Balboa Park Station	Candlestick Park	Balboa Park	Route map (PDF)
77X Candlestick Express	California and Van Ness; Pre-game	Candlestick Park	South of Market, Civic Center, Pacific Heights, Fort Mason (post-game only)	Route map (PDF)
77X Candlestick Express	Van Ness and North Point; Post-game	Candlestick Park	South of Market, Civic Center, Pacific Heights, Fort Mason (post-game only)	Route map (PDF)
78X Candlestick Express	Funston and California	Candlestick Park	Richmond, Golden Gate Park, Sunset, Stonestown Galleria, Crocker-Amazon, Excelsior, Balboa Park	Route map (PDF)
79X Candlestick Express	Sutter and Sansome	Candlestick Park	Financial District, South of Market	Route map (PDF)
86 Candlestick Shuttle	Bacon and San Bruno	Candlestick Park	Portola	Route map (PDF)
87 Candlestick Shuttle	Gilman and Third	Candlestick Park	Bayview-Hunters Point	Route map (PDF)

=== R Howard ===
The R Howard was a trolleybus line created on September 7, 1941. It ran from Beale and Howard on Howard and South Van Ness Avenue to Army Street (now Cesar Chavez Street). It was combined with the E Union in July 1947, and was renumbered 41 in February 1949.

== Defunct streetcar routes ==
=== A Geary-10th Avenue ===
The A Geary-10th Avenue was Muni's first streetcar line, running from Market Street and Kearny Street, and later from the Ferry Building, along Geary and 10th Avenue to Fulton Street. The route was discontinued on December 5, 1932. In 2009, part of the route was under study to be restored as bus rapid transit and possibly as a streetcar route.

=== B Geary ===
The B Geary (also known as the B Geary-Ocean) was a streetcar route that operated along Market Street and Geary Boulevard to the Playland amusement park along Ocean Beach. It originally ran as a shuttle between 10th Avenue and 33rd Avenue, and was later extended east along Geary and Market Street to the Ferry Building to the east, and along 33rd Avenue, Balboa, 45th Avenue and Cabrillo to Great Highway to the west. The line was replaced with the 38 Geary bus route on December 29, 1956.

There are plans to construct a light rail corridor on Geary Boulevard between Van Ness Avenue and 33rd Avenue. Funding has not been identified to build rail in this corridor, however it was identified as a Tier 1 Long Term Corridor Investment (the highest priority) in 2016.

=== C Geary-California ===
The C California (also known as the C Geary-California) was a streetcar route that ran from the Ferry Building along Market Street, Geary, 2nd Avenue, Cornwall, and California to 33rd Avenue. The route was cut short in 1950 to California and 2nd Avenue with the opening of the 1 California bus line, and was removed along with the B Geary on December 29, 1956. In 2009, part of the route was under study to be restored for Bus Rapid Transit.

This route was created shortly after the Market Street Railway's franchise expired on California street. By 1950, the line was essentially a short-turn version of the B Geary streetcar route, which continued out to Ocean Beach.

=== D Geary-Van Ness ===
The D Geary-Van Ness was a streetcar route created on August 15, 1914, that originally ran from the Ferry Building along Market Street, Geary, Van Ness, and Chestnut to Scott. In 1918, the route was changed to operate on Union Street instead of Chestnut, and was extended along Steiner Street and Greenwich Street and into the Presidio later that year.

The route was replaced with buses on March 18, 1950, and renamed the 45 Greenwich. This was one of four routes planned as a result of the 1915 Panama–Pacific International Exposition. In 2009, parts of the Geary and Van Ness Corridors it once traveled were up for study for Bus Rapid Transit, and possibly, restoration of light rail transit in the area.

=== E Union ===
The E Union was a streetcar route that ran from the Ferry Building to the Presidio via The Embarcadero, Washington/Jackson, Columbus, Union, Larkin, Vallejo, Franklin, Union, Baker and Greenwich into the Presidio. The route was replaced on July 20, 1947, by an extension of the R-Howard trolleybus route, which in turn was renumbered 41-Union on February 1, 1949. The 41-Union still runs today. It was reduced to rush-hour service on October 1, 1988. This was one of four routes planned as a result of the 1915 Panama–Pacific International Exposition. Today, the E designation is used for the E Embarcadero historic streetcar route.

=== F Stockton ===
The F Stockton was a streetcar route that ran from Market and Stockton to the Marina District via Stockton, Columbus, North Point, Van Ness, and Chestnut to Laguna. The Stockton Street Tunnel, opened in 1914, was built primarily for these streetcars. In 1916, the line was extended from Chestnut and Laguna to Chestnut and Scott, and was extended in 1947 from Market and Stockton down 4th Street to the Southern Pacific terminal on Townsend. The route was replaced on January 20, 1951, with the 30 Stockton bus route, which still runs today, and is notable for being the slowest trolleybus route in the city of San Francisco because it travels through the densely populated neighborhood of Chinatown. This was one of four routes planned as a result of the 1915 Panama–Pacific International Exposition. Since 1995, the F designation is used for the F Market & Wharves historic streetcar route.

The southernmost part of this route, from Market to Jackson, is once again served by light rail by the T Third Street after the Central Subway was opened. A further extension of the line may replace the rest of the present 30 Stockton bus line extending to the Presidio, depending on where the eventual exit from the subway tunnel is placed.

=== H Potrero ===
The H Potrero streetcar line was created on August 15, 1914, to serve the Panama-Pacific International exposition. It ran from Army Street (Now Cesar Chavez Street) and Potrero to a terminal inside Fort Mason, via Potrero, Division, 11th Street and Van Ness. In 1946 the line was extended along former Market Street Railway trackage on Bayshore and San Bruno to Arleta. The southern terminal was cut back to San Bruno and Wilde in 1947, and in 1948 the northern terminal was cut back to Van Ness and Bay. The route was replaced on March 19, 1950, with the 47 Potrero bus line. The 47 line has since been changed and no longer runs on Potrero, and the only bus line that follows the old H line is the nighttime-only 90 Owl.

The Van Ness Bus Rapid Transit line began operation in 2022; it was constructed by the San Francisco County Transportation Authority. A feasibility study was conducted in 2006, followed by a draft Environmental Impact Statement in 2011. A Locally Preferred Alternative was selected in early 2012. A Final EIS was expected in 2012, along with Caltrans approval. Construction began in 2016. The SFCTA currently does not have plans to revive the H-Potrero streetcar line.

=== 40 San Mateo ===
The 40 San Mateo was a 19.98-mile (32.15 km) interurban route that provided service along The Peninsula from 1903 to 1949. Previous service under the San Francisco and San Mateo Electric Railway only reached as far as Baden in South San Francisco. After being bought and sold several times, the line came under the ownership of the United Railroads of San Francisco, under whom it was finally built out to San Mateo with service starting on December 31, 1902. Starting at the corner of Steuart and Market in San Francisco, the tracks went southeast on Steuart and turned right on Harrison. Outbound cars used Harrison until 14th Street while inbound cars used Bryant between 8th and Essex. The line continued down 14th, turning south on Guerrero, west on 30th, south on Cerney, south on Diamond, and continuing on Monterey to San Jose avenue before entering San Mateo County.

By 1906, the northern terminus was at Fifth and Market whereupon it ran down 5th to Mission Street continuing to San Jose Avenue (for some time also running on Onondaga and Ocean), then on a largely private right-of-way to a terminal in San Mateo. Service was discontinued as the trackage and rolling stock had fallen into disrepair by the mid-1940s. Short segments of the line had remained in use by the late 1970s, and some of the right of way on San Jose Avenue and 30th Street was rebuilt for modern Muni Metro Service as extensions of the M Ocean View and J Church lines in the 1980s and 1990s.

=== Temporary routes ===
The G Exposition, I Exposition, and J Exposition were temporary streetcar lines that were created in 1915 and 1916 to serve the Panama–Pacific International Exposition. The G line was a combination of the E and F routes, running from Market and Stockton to the Presidio. The I line only ran for three days in February 1915, from 33rd Avenue and Geary via Geary, Van Ness, Chestnut, Scott, Greenwich and Steiner to Union. The J line, which is unrelated to the current J Church line, ran via Columbus from the Ferry Building to Fort Mason and later to Chestnut and Scott.

The O Van Ness line operated briefly between June 1, 1932, and July 15, 1932, along part of the E Union from Van Ness and Union to the Ferry Building. During this time, the E line ran down Van Ness to Market instead of to the Ferry Building.

The E Embarcadero line operated between Embarcadero station and 4th and King over the new Muni Metro Extension from January 1998 until August 1998, when it was merged into an extension of the N Judah line. The name was reused for an unrelated heritage streetcar line in 2015.

== Defunct cable car routes ==
Note: Before 1954, the California Street Line extended all the way from Market Street in the Financial District to California and Presidio Avenue on the western edge of the Western Addition.

Line	Inbound Terminal	Outbound Terminal	Reason for discontinuing	Areas served	Year Started	Year Discontinued
O'Farrell-Jones-Hyde	Began at Market and O'Farrell, down O'Farrell to Jones (there was a cable car shuttle from Market and Jones to O'Farrell and Jones), down Jones to Pine, down Pine to Hyde, down Hyde to North Point (used California St. style double-ended cable cars). Section from Hyde and Beach Streets to Washington Street forms the northern part of the Powell-Hyde Line, while section from Washington to California Street is used as non-revenue track.	Hyde and North Point	1956 decision to close down all cable lines except those originating on California St. and Powell St. and end all cable car lines at Van Ness Ave.	Tenderloin, Russian Hill, Fisherman's Wharf	1952 (taken over from California Street Cable Railroad)	1956
Powell-Washington-Jackson	Began at Market and Powell, up Powell to Jackson, out Jackson to Steiner, back downtown from Steiner on Washington (used Powell Street style single-ended cable cars). Forms the Powell and Washington/Jackson one way segments of the Powell-Hyde Line.	Jackson and Steiner	1956 decision to close down all cable lines except those originating on California St. and Powell St. and end all cable car lines at Van Ness Ave.	Nob Hill, Pacific Heights	1944 (taken over from Market Street Railway)	1956

== See also ==
- San Francisco Historic Trolley Festival
- List of San Francisco Municipal Railway lines
- Muni Metro
- E Embarcadero
- F Market & Wharves
