= Laurel Heights, San Francisco =

Neighbourhood in San Francisco

Coordinates: 37°47′02.9″N 122°27′09.7″W

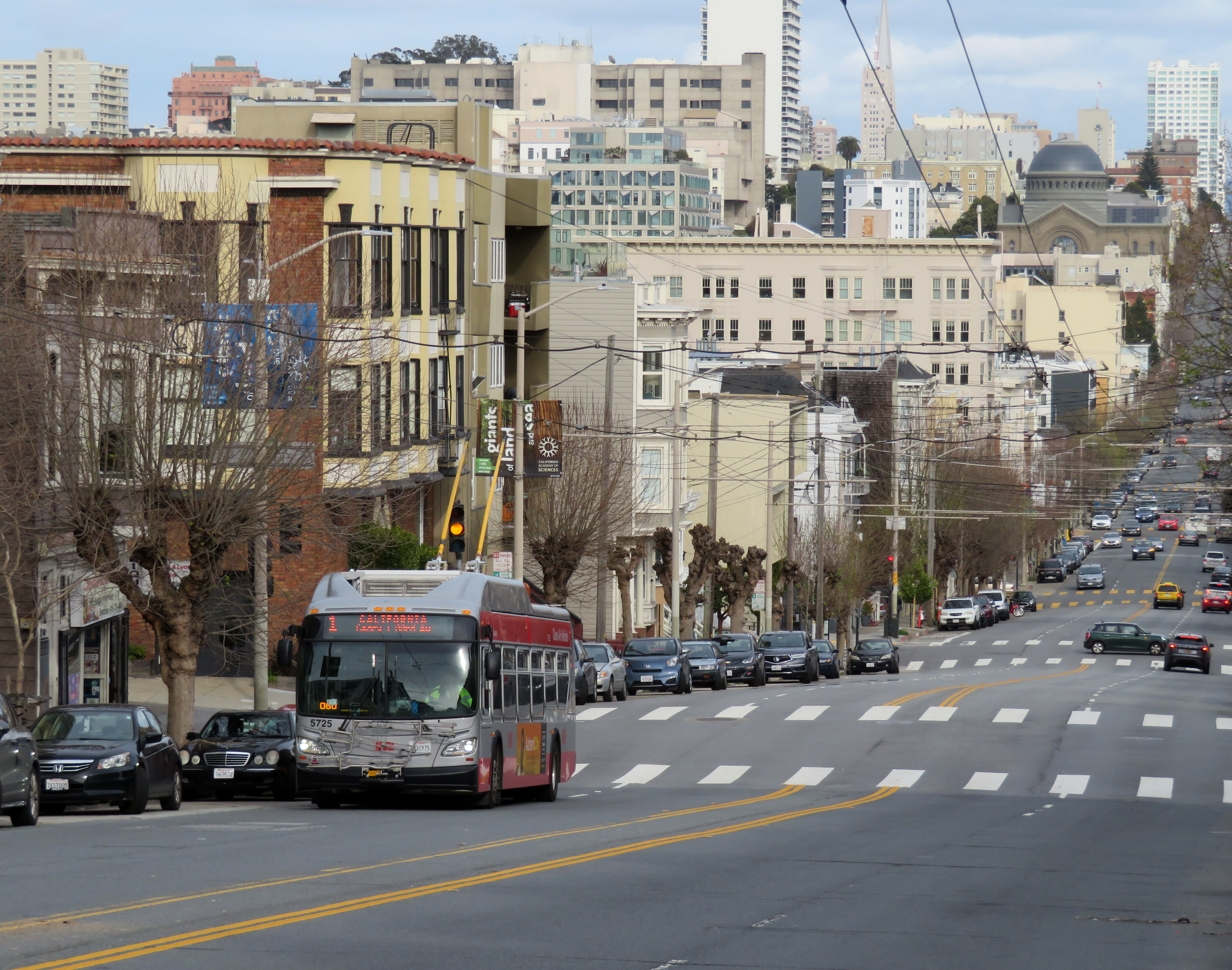
California Street in Laurel Heights.

Laurel Heights is a neighborhood of San Francisco, California. It is located to the south of the Presidio of San Francisco and east of the Richmond District. It is bordered by Geary Boulevard and the University of San Francisco campus to the south, Arguello Boulevard to the west, California Street to the north and Presidio Avenue to the east.

== About ==
The Laurel Village shopping center is located on California between Laurel and Spruce, the California Pacific Medical Center is on California between Arguello and Maple, and a previous UCSF campus (UCSF Laurel Heights, which relocated its operation to the UCSF Mission Bay campus in 2023) is located in the northeastern corner of the neighborhood.

The neighborhood is characterized by two-story Edwardian and Victorian style homes in an upper-middle class suburban neighborhood. The area has an award-winning public school: Roosevelt Middle School, located on Arguello Street, near Geary Avenue.
