= Michael O'Shaughnessy =

Irish-American civil engineer (1864–1934)

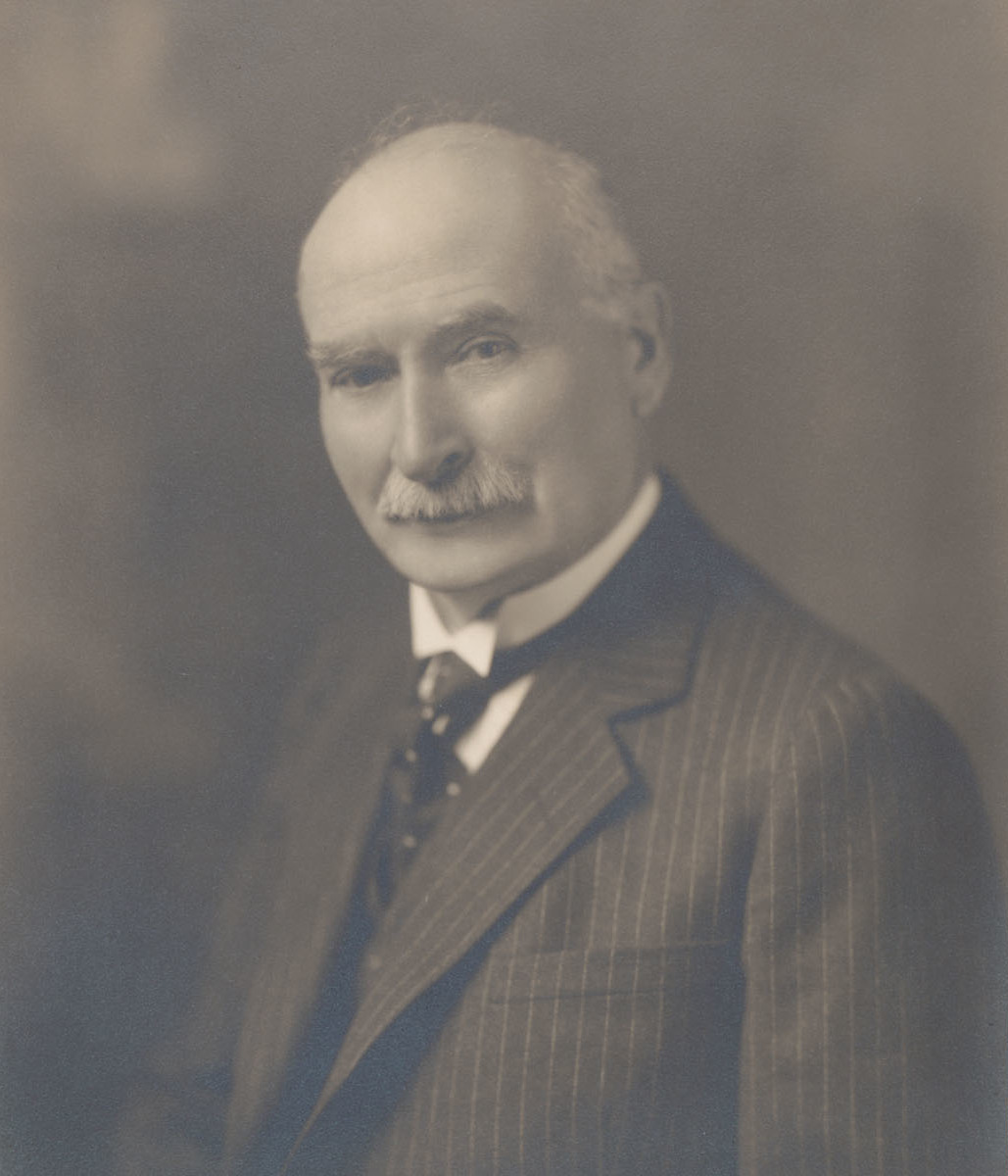
- Michael O'Shaughnessy
- Born: 28 May 1864; County Limerick, Ireland
- Died: 12 October 1934 (aged 70); San Francisco, California
- Education: NUI Galway
- Occupation: Engineer
- Spouse: Mary Spottiswood
- Children: 5
- Parent(s): Patrick O'Shaughnessy; Margaret O'Donnell

Michael Maurice O'Shaughnessy (28 May 1864 – 12 October 1934) was an Irish civil engineer who became city engineer for the city of San Francisco during the early twentieth century and developed both the San Francisco Municipal Railway (Muni) and the Hetch Hetchy water system. He is sometimes credited as being "the Irishman who built San Francisco."

== Early life, education, and immigration ==
O'Shaughnessy was born to farmers Patrick and Margaret (née O'Donnell) at the family cottage named Jointer in Loughill Parish, County Limerick, Ireland on May 28, 1864; he was one of nine children. At two years old, he was sent to live with his maternal grandparents, approximately 16 mi (26 km) east of his birthplace, along with his Uncle Maurice, Aunt Alice, sister Kate, and cousin Margaret O'Clery, who had been orphaned. In 1875, he entered the Mount Trenchard National School and completed his studies there on September 25, 1880, whereupon he tried his hand at farming briefly before deciding to train as a civil engineer. He began those studies at Rockwell College in County Tipperary for half a year, starting from January 1881, and later attended University College Cork for a year starting in fall 1881 and the University of Galway the next fall, then graduated from the Royal University of Dublin on October 21, 1884.

After returning to the family home for a few months, O'Shaughnessy visited London in January 1885 to sightsee and apply for a position, but was encouraged to pursue his career in California instead. He departed from Liverpool on March 8, 1885 aboard the Guion Mail Steamer Wisconsin with a cousin, J.S. Molony, arriving in New York on March 18. After arriving, he purchased a cross-country railroad ticket for US$70 (equivalent to $2,500 in 2025) and arrived in San Francisco on March 30, having traveled via rail through Cincinnati, St. Louis, Kansas City, Denver, Ogden, and Oakland, completing the trip via ferry from the Oakland mole. He took mass at Old St. Mary's Cathedral the next day.

He married Mary Spottiswood on October 21, 1890 in San Francisco. After a month-long honeymoon to St. Louis, they lived with her parents for two years.

== Career ==
=== The new Californian ===
None of the letters of introduction that O'Shaughnessy had carried from Ireland led to a job, but he remained active in the local Irish community, where he struck up a friendship with Dr. Buckley, who had graduated from Queen's College Cork and arranged for O'Shaughnessy to start as an assistant engineer for the Sierra Valley & Mohawk Railway in Plumas County, California in January 1886, at the salary of US$40 (equivalent to $1,400 in 2025) per month, with board included. After three or four months, O'Shaughnessy was dismissed; on the stage back to San Francisco, he received a letter from the Southern Pacific Railroad offering employment, where he was responsible for laying out the towns of Niles, Tracy, Sanger, Lindsay, Porterville, Merced, Mill Valley, and Dinuba between 1886 and 1888. After leaving SP, O'Shaughnessy began his consulting engineering practice.

On July 4, 1890, O'Shaughnessy went hiking to the top of Mount Tamalpais with his fiancée Mary and several of her siblings; the day was hot and he had brought 2 US gal (7.6 L; 1.7 imp gal) of water, but it was all consumed before they reached the top. While O'Shaughnessy was looking for an easier route down the mountain, he found a brook just below the summit and refilled his jug, returning to refresh the party's spirits for the descent. A few days later, he described to the Tamalpais Land & Water Company how he proposed to route the water from the brook to supply water for Mill Valley without an expensive dam; he completed the design and surveying for the water project by the time he married Mary in October.

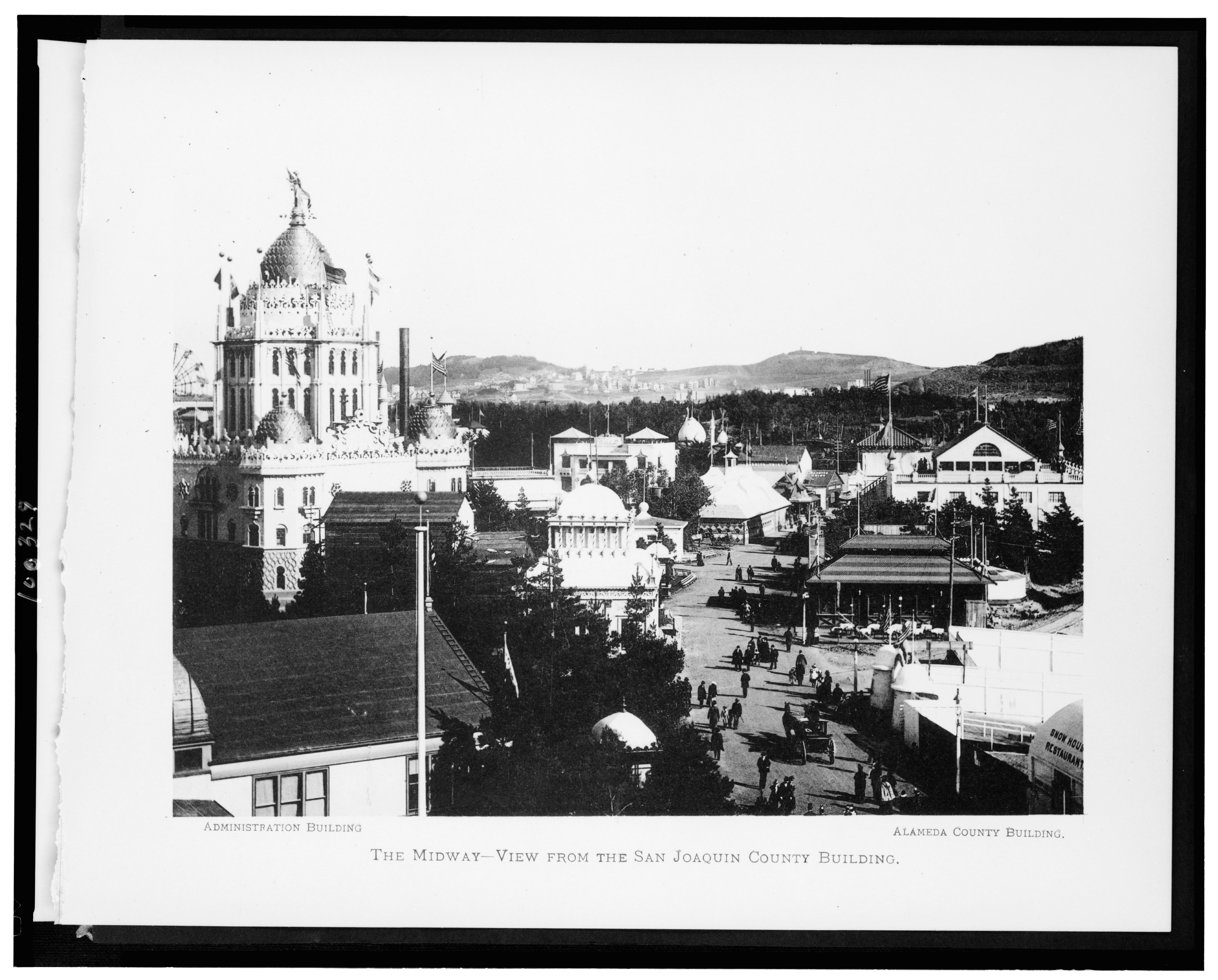
View of the Midwinter Exposition midway, from the San Joaquin County Building (1894)

O'Shaughnessy's involvement with the city and county of San Francisco began in the early 1890s. In 1891, he was contracted by the San Francisco Board of Supervisors (SFBOS), then controlled by Democrats, to survey the extension of Market Street over Twin Peaks and subsequently was cheated out of his contracted fee of US$5,000 (equivalent to $180,000 in 2025); the next year, he was contracted again by the SFBOS, then controlled by Republicans, for an extension of Potrero Avenue from Ninth Street to the county line, and again was cheated out of US$5,000 (equivalent to $180,000 in 2025). In 1893, he served as the chief engineer for the California Midwinter Exposition held in Golden Gate Park. On June 1, 1893, he moved with his growing family (then with two children) to a new house in Mill Valley. While planning the Expo, he had to work with John McLaren, who forbade him from cutting any trees.

O'Shaughnessy also was responsible for surveying a site for a race course near Ingleside in 1890; originally, he had been contracted to survey a course on property that belonged to the Spring Valley Water Company, but the chief engineer of Spring Valley, Hermann Schussler, rejected the proposal over objections to stable waste, so O'Shaughnessy surveyed what would become the Ingleside course at his own expense. Later, after being introduced to Edward C. Corrigan in 1894, he convinced Corrigan to abandon an alternative site north of Ocean Avenue and build at Ingleside instead. After reviewing some surveys at the end of 1894 by traveling to the site in person, he began serving as the chief engineer of the Mountain Copper Company, part of the Iron Mountain Mine of Shasta County, where he supervised the construction of the Iron Mountain Railway (California), 12 mi (19 km) of narrow-gauge railway in 1895. Outside of this work, which involved surveying the right-of-way for a railroad and building it, O'Shaughnessy kept busy surveying a rail route between Eureka and Red Bluff (1896–97) and working for Schussler to survey potential additions for Spring Valley Water in Alameda County (1898).

=== Irrigating Hawaiian sugar ===
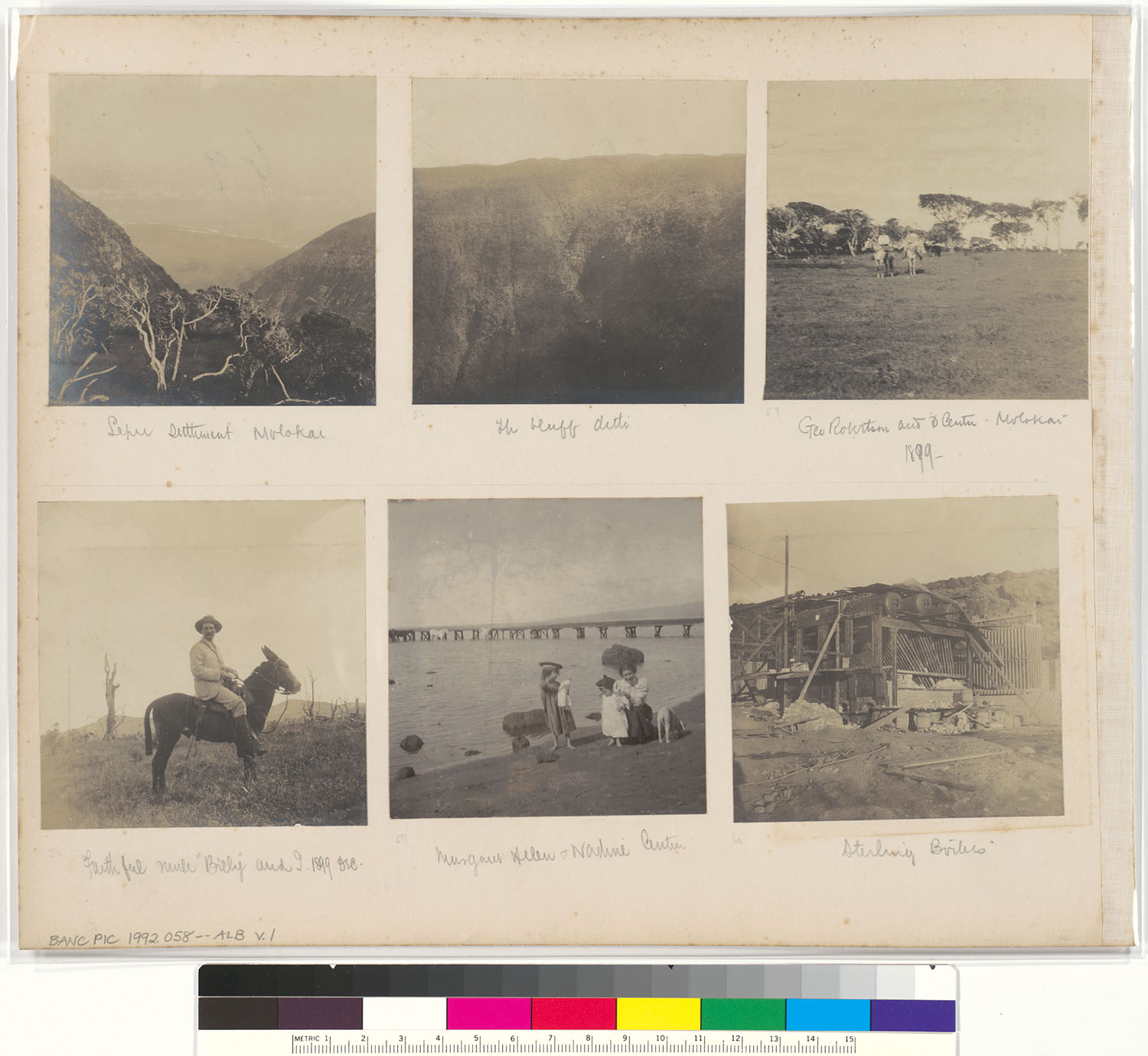
Photographs from O'Shaughnessy's 1899 trip to Hawaii; he is pictured at bottom left with "faithful mule 'Billy'"

He then turned his attention to the Territory of Hawaii, after Schussler called him on behalf of Edward Pollitz to map what would become the Wailuku Sugar Plantation in May 1899. After arriving at Honolulu, he took a train to the Waianae Sugar Company plantation and hiked 6 mi (9.7 km) to visit water tunnels nearby, through which flowed 2,000,000 US gal/d (5,300 L/min). He then booked passage to the island of Hawaii to visit the plantation. Warned of Hawaii's monsoons, O'Shaughnessy prepared by outfitting himself with rubber hat, coat, and boots, causing the plantation manager to have a laughing fit at his ridiculous appearance when they first met, but O'Shaughnessy had the last laugh as that day turned out to be quite wet. He returned to San Francisco on July 4, laden with notes, data, and curios as he thought he would never return to Hawaii, but in September of that year, O'Shaughnessy was retained by George Robertson (son of George Morison Robertson) of C. Brewer & Co. to review a proposed aqueduct connecting a pumping station at Kaunakakai on Molokai to a plantation approximately 4 mi (6.4 km) to the west, prompting his return to the islands. His report impressed the company, which then hired him as a consulting engineer, reserving 1/3 of his time over three years at an annual salary of US$6,500 (equivalent to $250,000 in 2025).

... But the Nahiku Ditch is not an ordinary ditch. The windward side of Haleakala is serried by a thousand precipitous gorges, down which rush as many torrents, each torrent of which achieves a score of cascades and water falls before it reaches the sea. More rain comes down here than in any other region in the world. In 1904 the year's downpour was four hundred and twenty inches. Water means sugar, and sugar is the backbone of the territory of Hawaii, wherefore the Nahiku Ditch, which is not a ditch, but a chain of tunnels. The water travels underground, appearing only at intervals to leap a gorge, travelling high in the air on a giddy flume and plunging into and through the opposing mountain. This magnificent waterway is called a "ditch," and with equal appropriateness can Cleopatra's barge be called a box-car.
There are no carriage roads through the ditch country, and before the ditch was built, or bored, rather, there was no horse-trail. Hundreds of inches of rain annually, on fertile soil, under a tropic sun, means a steaming jungle of vegetation. A man, on foot, cutting his way through, might advance a mile a day, but at the end of a week he would be a wreck, and he would have to crawl hastily back if he wanted to get out before the vegetation overran the passage way he had cut. O'Shaughnessy was the daring engineer who conquered the jungle and the gorges, ran the ditch, and made the horse-trail. He built enduringly, in concrete and masonry, and made one of the most remarkable water-farms in the world.

— Jack London, The Cruise of the Snark

He essentially moved his engineering office from San Francisco to Hawaii, arriving in January 1900, but was quarantined upon arrival in Honolulu due to an outbreak of the plague which would lead to the fire and partial destruction of the local Chinatown. After returning to Kaunakakai, O'Shaughnessy sunk some test wells and discovered that at the proposed pumping rate, the irrigation water would become contaminated with salt, which proved true once the station began operating in May, causing the plantation on Molokai to founder and he was let go by the company. However, O'Shaughnessy would spend the next 11 months consulting on numerous water projects and developing a reputation as the authoritative water engineer in Hawaii before returning to San Francisco that December. Through 1906, O'Shaughnessy worked on surveying routes for and supervising the construction of large aqueducts in Hawaii, including the Olokele (Kauai, 1901–03), stretching 13 mi (21 km) to the Makaweli Plantation; Koʻolau, aka Nahiku Ditch (Maui, 1903–04), which included a 7 1/2 mi (12.1 km) tunnel section over its 10 mi (16 km) length; and Kohala (Hawaii, 1905–06), which had 45 tunnels with an aggregate length of 46,000 ft (14,000 m) and an overall length of 14 mi (23 km). His time in Hawaii was interrupted by the 1906 San Francisco earthquake and subsequent fire, which he learned of on April 18 during a trip to Honolulu to procure cement; O'Shaughnessy booked passage on the next available ship.

O'Shaughnessy published a paper describing irrigation in Hawaii for the Hawaiian Planters' Monthly for October 1904, later republished in Thrum's Hawaiian Annual (1905), updated for Engineering News (1909) and subsequently reprinted nearly a century later in Organization & Environment (2007). Jack London visited Hawaii in 1907 with his wife Charmian, who praised O'Shaughnessy for his "magnificent irrigation scheme that harnessed the abundant waterfalls and tremendously increased the output of the invaluable sugar plantations" after viewing the systems on Maui and Hawaii.

=== Return to California ===
After returning to San Francisco from Hawaii, he met with James Rolph, who was heading an earthquake relief committee at the time. The meeting was to discuss business: Rolph held an option to purchase the more than 10,000-acre (4,000 ha) San Vincente Ranch near Santa Cruz, and he wanted O'Shaughnessy to inspect the property and report back to Rolph on its condition. This done, O'Shaughnessy returned to Hawaii to close out his work on Kohala, staying there for approximately one month, and upon his second return to San Francisco, happened to chance upon an acquaintance from the Mountain Copper Company, M. C. Couchot, who had previously handled drafting work for the engineer. Couchot told O'Shaughnessy that he was now heading a construction company near Marysville and jokingly, O'Shaughnessy suggested they form a partnership, to which Couchot agreed; however, O'Shaughnessy quickly grew tired of the resulting work, in which he would provide estimated construction costs for owners of proposed buildings that would follow the plans through to completion.

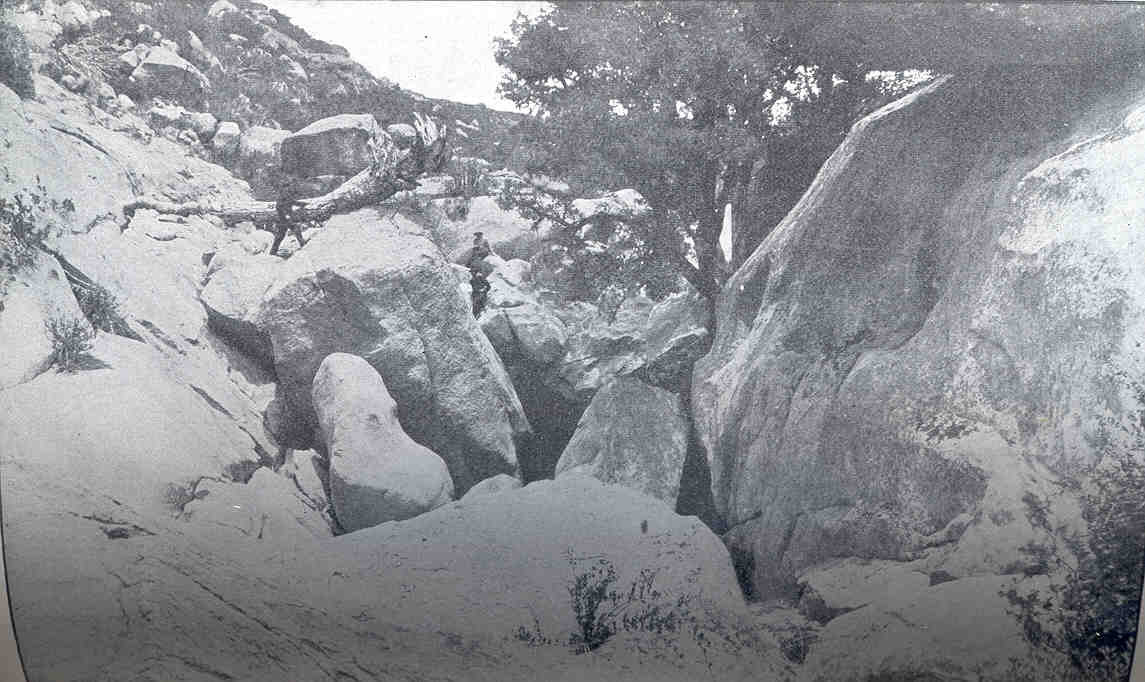
Future site of Morena Dam (1902)

In December 1906, O'Shaughnessy was contacted by the brothers John D. and Adolph B. Spreckels, who asked him to inspect the work in progress on Morena Dam, which they were building at Barrett near San Diego to supply water to the city, and estimate the cost and schedule to complete it. O'Shaughnessy was hired by John Spreckels to act as a consulting engineer for the project in May 1907; a construction contract was let that July and water began flowing to the city's Lower Otay Reservoir via the Dulzura Conduit, an aqueduct connected to Morena Dam, on January 3, 1909, six months ahead of schedule. Construction of the dam itself was not completed until 1912; by that time, O'Shaughnessy had been recruited by Rolph, now serving as Mayor of San Francisco. He reluctantly packed up his belongings and left San Diego in August. On December 28, the Spreckels brothers called O'Shaughnessy to their offices in San Francisco, where they presented him with a bonus check "in five figures to make up the deficit which they felt they owed me".

=== City Engineer of San Francisco ===
In late August 1912, San Francisco Mayor Rolph contacted O'Shaughnessy at Southern California Mountain Water Company and asked him if he would be willing to serve as city engineer; O'Shaughnessy's lingering bitterness over the two failed surveys of 1891 and 1892 made him wary initially. After an interview on August 31, Rolph made him a salary offer of US$15,000 (equivalent to $500,000 in 2025) per year, but O'Shaughnessy had made twice that in 1911. Rolph explained the daunting scope that faced the incoming city engineer for what was considered an exorbitant sum for the role. O'Shaughnessy would need to assume multiple major projects: build Hetch Hetchy, administer Spring Valley Water, then being considered for purchase by the city, complete the Geary Street Railway, and complete in-progress improvements to the sewer and fire protection systems. The prospective challenge of rebuilding a city devastated by the earthquake and fire delighted O'Shaughnessy, and he accepted the role.

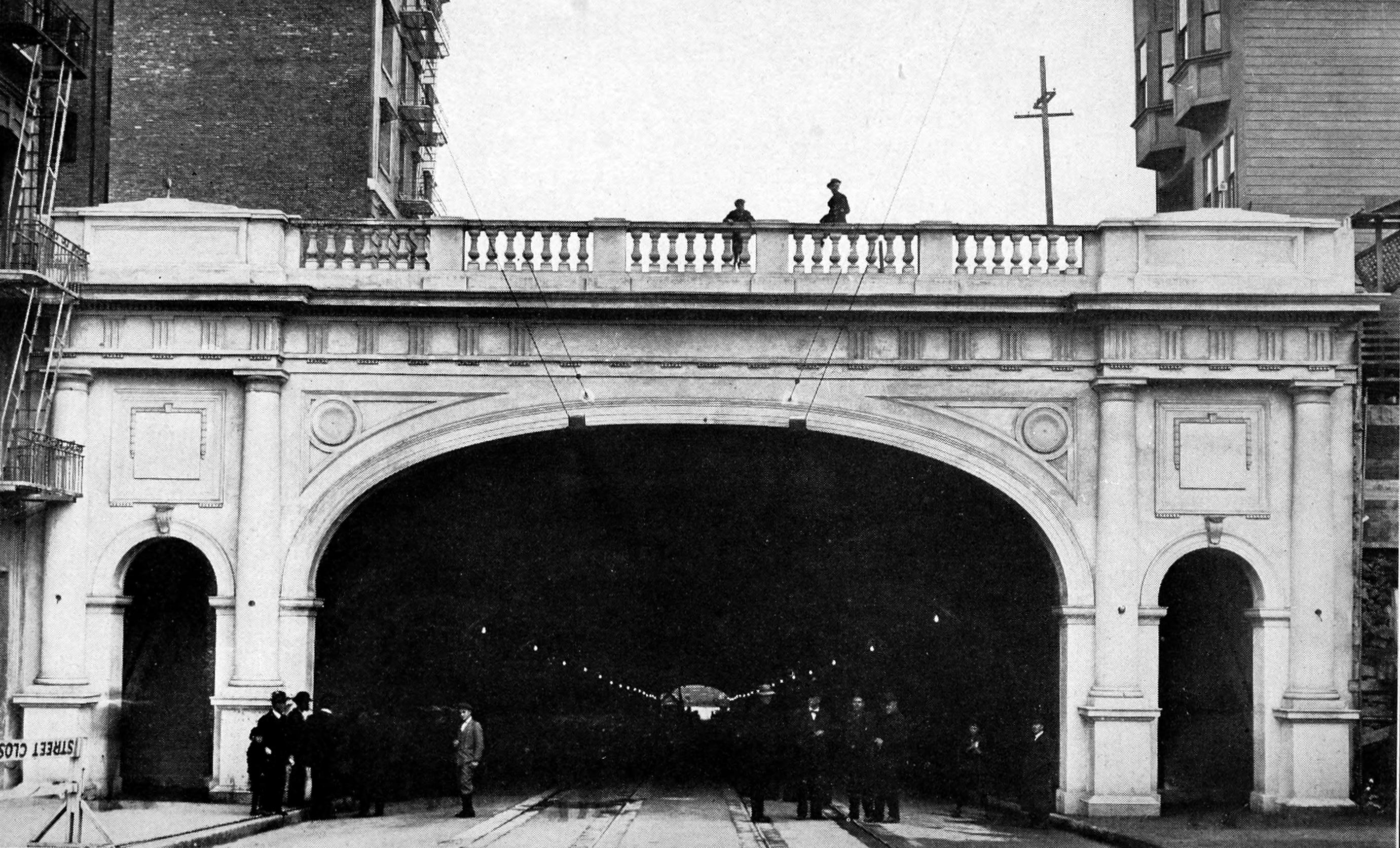
Stockton Street Tunnel, north portal (1914)

After taking over on September 1 from the retiring city engineer, Marsden Manson, O'Shaughnessy took action within a week to minimize costs and preserve schedule by denying a request to line the planned Stockton Street Tunnel with brick. Under O'Shaughnessy, the San Francisco Municipal Railway (Muni) started operation as the first publicly owned railway in San Francisco, with the A Geary-10th Avenue line beginning revenue service on December 28, 1912. The proposed Fillmore Street Tunnel was authorized in 1913, the same time as a new streetcar line along Van Ness Avenue; both projects were intended to bring visitors to the Panama–Pacific Exposition, but the former never materialized due to prioritization of the Twin Peaks Tunnel.

1914 was a busy year for Muni as it geared up to serve the Panama–Pacific Exposition by opening the D Geary-Van Ness line along in August, completing the tunnel along Stockton in late December, and starting construction on the Twin Peaks Tunnel, which was planned and built under O'Shaughnessy's leadership; as a compromise to rein in potential costs, O'Shaughnessy shortened the length of the Twin Peaks Tunnel originally proposed by Bion Arnold, cutting the construction budget from $7 million to $4M. That tunnel was started on November 30, 1914, and completed on July 14, 1917. Privately, O'Shaughnessy reveled in the symbolic victory over property owners that had opposed his 1891 Market Street extension survey. With the completion of the Twin Peaks Tunnel, Market Street was equipped with four streetcar tracks and the business interests which previously had opposed its construction for fear it would hurt their profits found their sales doubling and quadrupling instead. In 1919, Muni introduced the "O'Shaughnessy" badge, which would endure as the service's logo until 1968. O'Shaughnessy also oversaw construction of the Sunset Tunnel in the 1920s, the final rail tunnel built in San Francisco until the completion of the Market Street subway in the 1970s for BART and the new Muni Metro light rail/streetcar system.

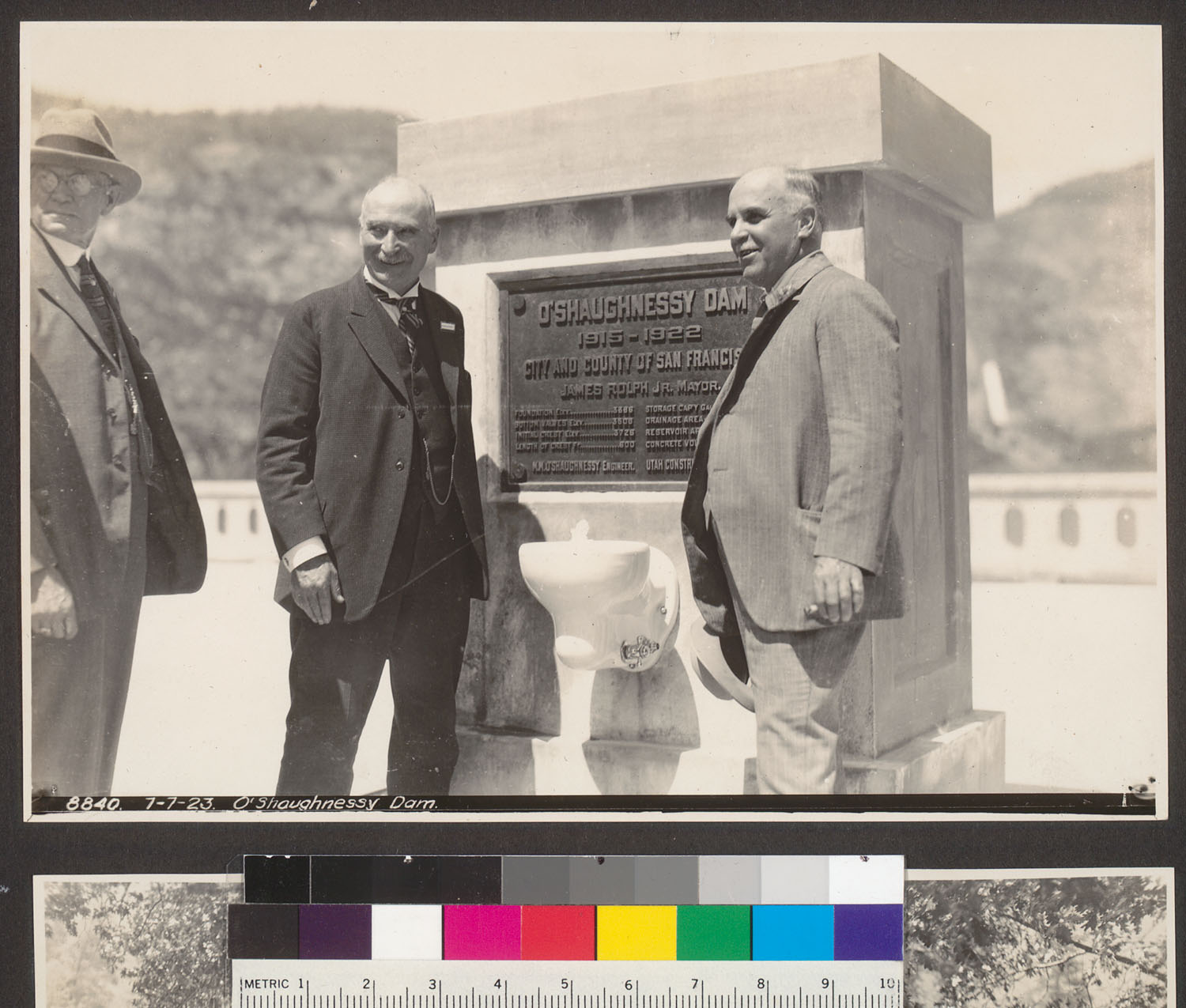
O'Shaughnessy (center) and Mayor Rolph (right) at the dedication ceremony for O'Shaughnessy Dam, July 7, 1923

Aside from overhauling the city's public transportation system, O'Shaughnessy also completed the work begun under his predecessors to rebuild the city's fire-fighting water and sewer services. His plans for the Mile Rock Tunnel, a sewer outfall draining much of the western half of the city, were approved by the SF Board of Public Works in January 1914 and Mile Rock was in use by September 1915; it was large enough that a party of officials, including Mayor Rolph and Engineer O'Shaughnessy, drove its length for an inspection just days before it was completed.

The majority of O'Shaughnessy's time as city engineer was spent on the Hetch Hetchy Valley project, which would bring water from the Tuolumne River in Yosemite to San Francisco, a distance of 167 mi (269 km). The project had been started under Manson's predecessor, Carl E. Grunsky, but protests kept delaying the project until President Woodrow Wilson granted the federal lands in Yosemite National Park to the city in 1912, approved under the 1913 Raker Act. Work on the dam started in 1919 and the dam was dedicated in 1923 for O'Shaughnessy upon its completion. The water impounded by the dam was held while the aqueduct to San Francisco was completed. He held the post of city engineer until 1932, when a new city charter was adopted, and he was subsequently appointed to the role of Consulting Engineer for Hetch Hetchy Water Supply by the San Francisco Public Utilities Commission.

== Death ==
O'Shaughnessy died of a heart attack on October 12, 1934, at his home in San Francisco, approximately two weeks before water started flowing from O'Shaughnessy Dam to the Bay Area. He was survived by his wife, Mary, and their five children: four daughters (Margaret, Mary, Helen, and Elizabeth) and a son (Francis). Funeral services were held at St. Vincent de Paul Church on October 15, attended by San Francisco Mayor Angelo Rossi, and he was buried at Holy Cross.

== Legacy ==
The Bancroft Library, University of California, Berkeley holds an archive with primary source material relating to O'Shaughnessy's job as City Engineer of SF.

In 2016, the O'Shaughnessy family donated an archive of "material that document his time in private practice, primarily engineering drawings, related reports and correspondence from the planning and execution of survey work in California, and irrigation design and construction projects in Hawaii" and "includes a large collection of photographs from his projects and his personal life. There are also many photographs of the fascinating O’Shaughnessy daughters that document their lives after their father’s death, up until the 1960s".

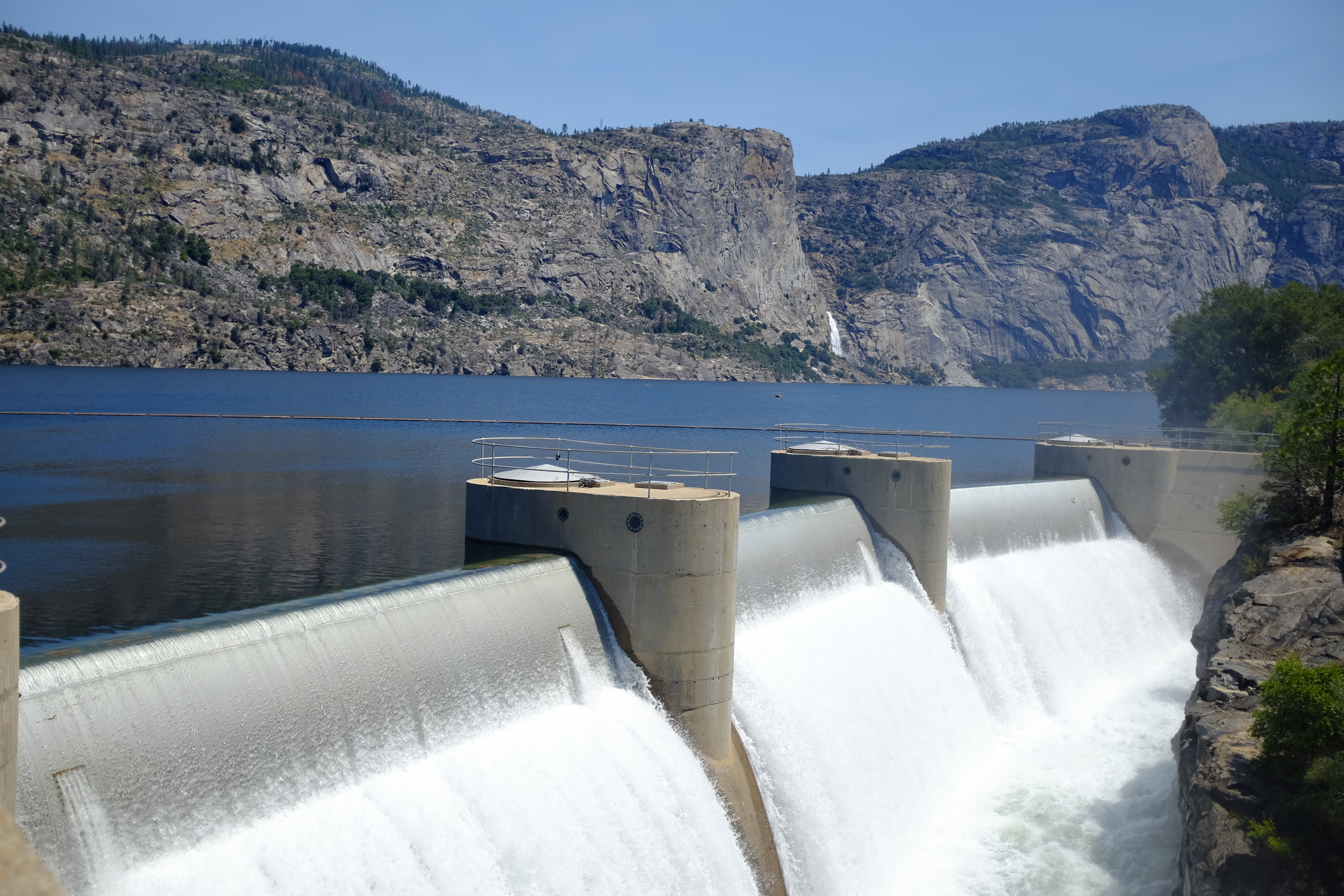
O'Shaughnessy Dam and spillway at Hetch Hetchy (2016)

O'Shaughnessy Dam, which impounds the water at Hetch Hetchy, is named for the longtime city engineer.

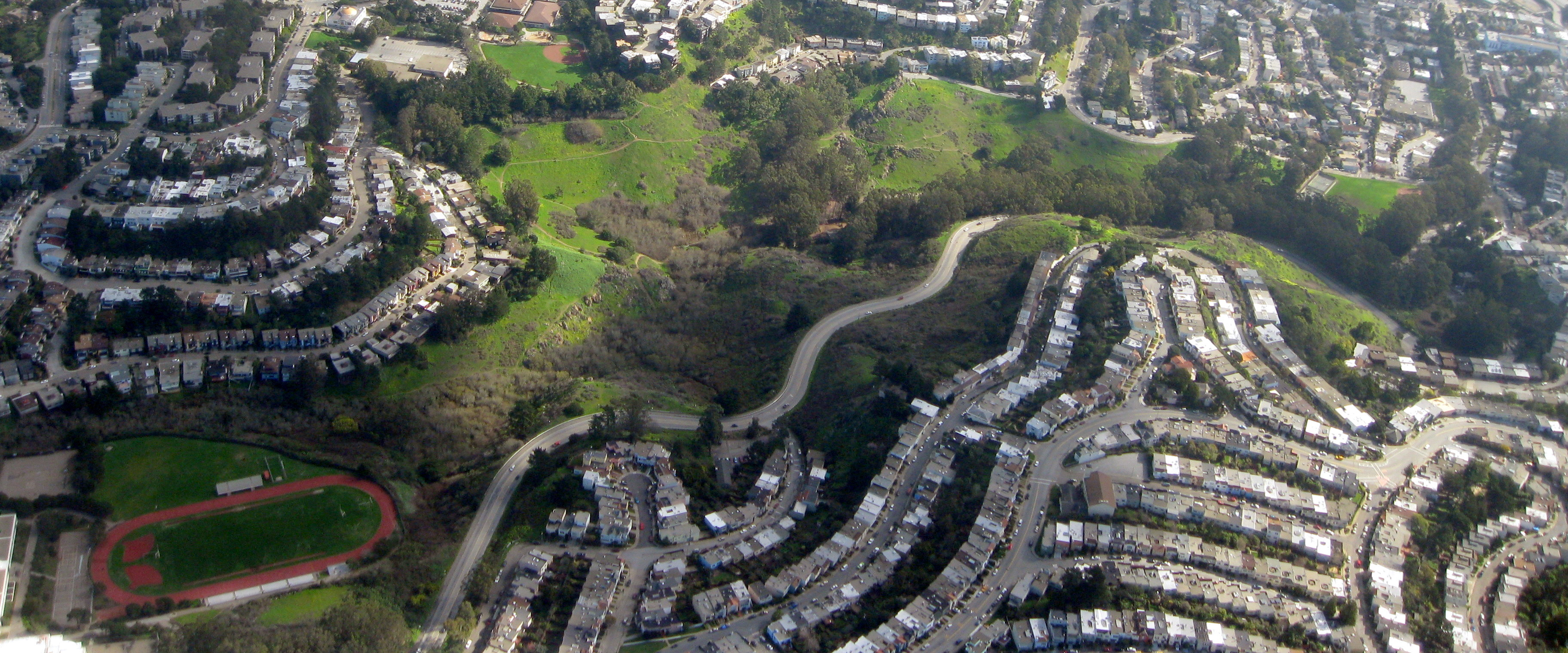
Glen Canyon Park and winding O'Shaughnessy Blvd are centered in this 2010 aerial photo, view facing east. In the lower left are the track & field for Ruth Asawa School.

In addition, O'Shaughnessy Boulevard in San Francisco, which serves as an extension of Bosworth Street and runs next to Glen Canyon Park, was named in his honor; the undeveloped area immediately west of O'Shaughnessy is known as O'Shaughnessy Hollow. Muni runs the busy 44 O'Shaughnessy route along the eponymous street, connecting the Richmond and Hunters Point neighborhoods.
