= Fillmore Street Tunnel =

Proposed San Francisco streetcar tunnel

- Cross-section of proposed Fillmore Street Tunnel (1913)

Overview
- Location: San Francisco, California
- Coordinates: 37.7920°N 122.4345°W
- Status: canceled
- Route: Fillmore Street
- Start: Sutter Street
- End: Filbert Street

Operation
- Traffic: Railroad, automotive, and pedestrian

Technical
- Length: 4,332 feet (1,320 m)
- Tunnel clearance: 19 feet (6 m)
- Width: 29 ft (8.8 m) (rail + ped); 25 ft (7.6 m) (vehicle)

The Fillmore Street Tunnel was a proposed double-bore tunnel approximately 3/4 mile (1.2 km) long in San Francisco, California which would have carried Fillmore Street and a new streetcar line underneath Pacific Heights. The proposed tunnel would have connected the Western Addition and Fillmore Districts, near the south portal at Sutter Street, with Marina and Cow Hollow, near the north portal at Filbert Street. One tunnel would have been reserved for railroad and pedestrian traffic, while the parallel tunnel would have been for vehicles. The tunnel was planned, along with the contemporary Twin Peaks and Stockton Street Tunnels, to serve the traffic that was anticipated from the 1914–15 Panama–Pacific International Exposition.

The tunnel was first announced in early 1912. However, the preparation of detailed plans and permits delayed the estimated start of construction to July 1914, which meant the tunnel could not be completed in time to service the Exposition, and the project was killed in September 1913.

== History ==
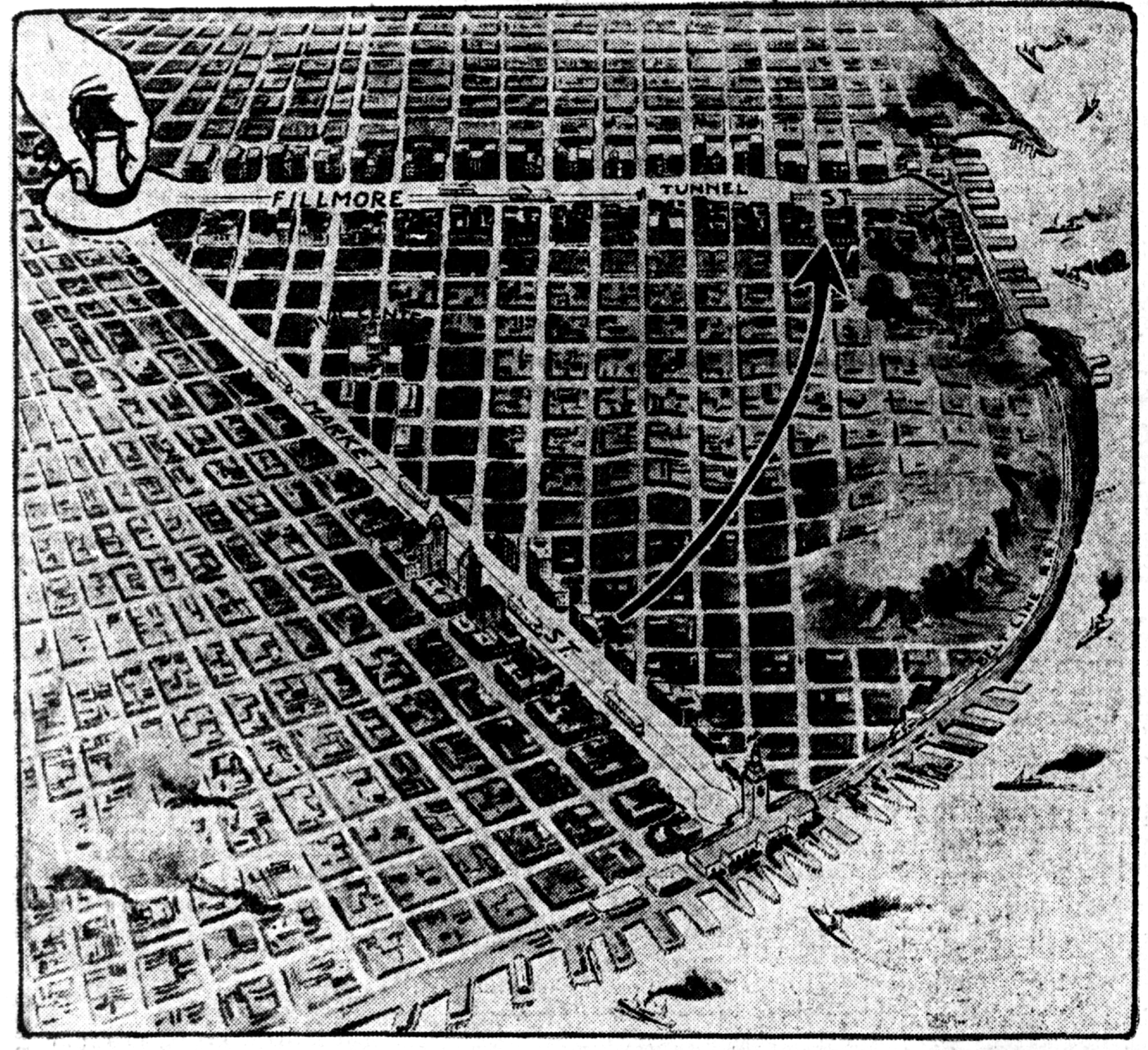
Diagram showing how the Fillmore Tunnel would connect Harbor View with the Western Addition

Shortly after the directors of the Panama–Pacific International Exposition (PPIE) selected a site in the Harbor View district, the merchants along Fillmore formed the Fillmore Street Improvement Association (FSIA) to study the possibility of constructing a tunnel along Fillmore Street. The FSIA hired an engineer to prepare preliminary plans and estimates, and FSIA members visited similar contemporary tunnels in Los Angeles to obtain practical advice; an official announcement was scheduled for early January 1912. Fillmore Street had come into prominence following the 1906 San Francisco earthquake, which forced many businesses to relocate from Market to Fillmore. In addition to the temporary benefit to speed traffic to and from the PPIE, the Fillmore Tunnel was expected to spur development along the northern waterfront for trade via the Panama Canal and to shorten the commute from the Marin County suburbs.

The modest cottages, the old-fashioned residences that now dot the Harbor View district will in time give way to modern apartment houses, hotels, office buildings and mercantile structures. Harbor View, once a dreary waste of swamp, the dumping ground of refuse, the "cow hollow" of the past, is destined in a few short years to be the scene of swarming commercial activity. The Fillmore street tunnel is the magician's wand that will work this transformation.

— San Francisco Call, Sep 12, 1912

The Fillmore Street Tunnel and a rival parallel route under Steiner Street, one block to the west, were compared in January 1912. While Steiner Street proponents declared their tunnel would be shorter and less expensive, the FSIA argued that tradition and existing streetcar routes favored their proposal. They pressed the case for Fillmore in a front-page editorial published in January 1912, and the editors of the San Francisco Call agreed with FSIA. By February, the Fillmore alignment was being favored over competing parallel routes along Steiner, Pierce, and Divisadero; however, the land and tunnels committee of the San Francisco Board of Supervisors delayed their official endorsement of the Fillmore Street Tunnel proposal while awaiting the results of consultant Bion J. Arnold's study; Arnold declared his support in March 1912 via telegram. Later that month, the City Attorney determined that rail service could be provided through the tunnel as an alternative to the existing surface streetcar franchise granted to the United Railroads of San Francisco (URR) on Fillmore; URR service was via the 23-line (Fillmore-Valencia) up the south side of Fillmore to Broadway, connecting to the Fillmore Counterbalance funicular on the steep north side down to Green on the Bay waterfront. Arnold followed up with a written report in April 1912 with a more detailed design and a cost estimate of $1.7–1.8 million, depending on configuration.

Planned portal locations for Fillmore Street Tunnel
1 North portal (Filbert)
2 South portal (Sutter)

Funding for the tunnel became an issue. Special assessment districts were established to cover the areas at the north and south ends of the tunnel, keeping with precedent established for the contemporary Twin Peaks and Stockton Street Tunnels. Property owners within these districts would be responsible to pay an extra land value tax based on property size; in return, the tunnel was expected to increase the assessed value of the property in the assessment districts after completion. The fairgrounds for the PPIE were in the northern special assessment district, but the land had been leased, and the PPIE Company could not agree on a plan to share the cost of the special property tax with the owners. In April 1912, the PPIE Company declined a tunnel assessment cost-sharing proposal, stating their budget was reserved for construction of buildings and grounds for the Exposition. The northern assessment district for the Fillmore Tunnel was projected to overlap with a western assessment district for a planned Broadway Tunnel, which would have caused some property owners to pay for two tunnels. The competing Devisadero [sic] Street Improvement Association also filed a protest over their inclusion in the special assessment district, stating they would receive no benefit and promoting their alignment instead. Residents of Harbor View also opposed further industrial development of their neighborhood.

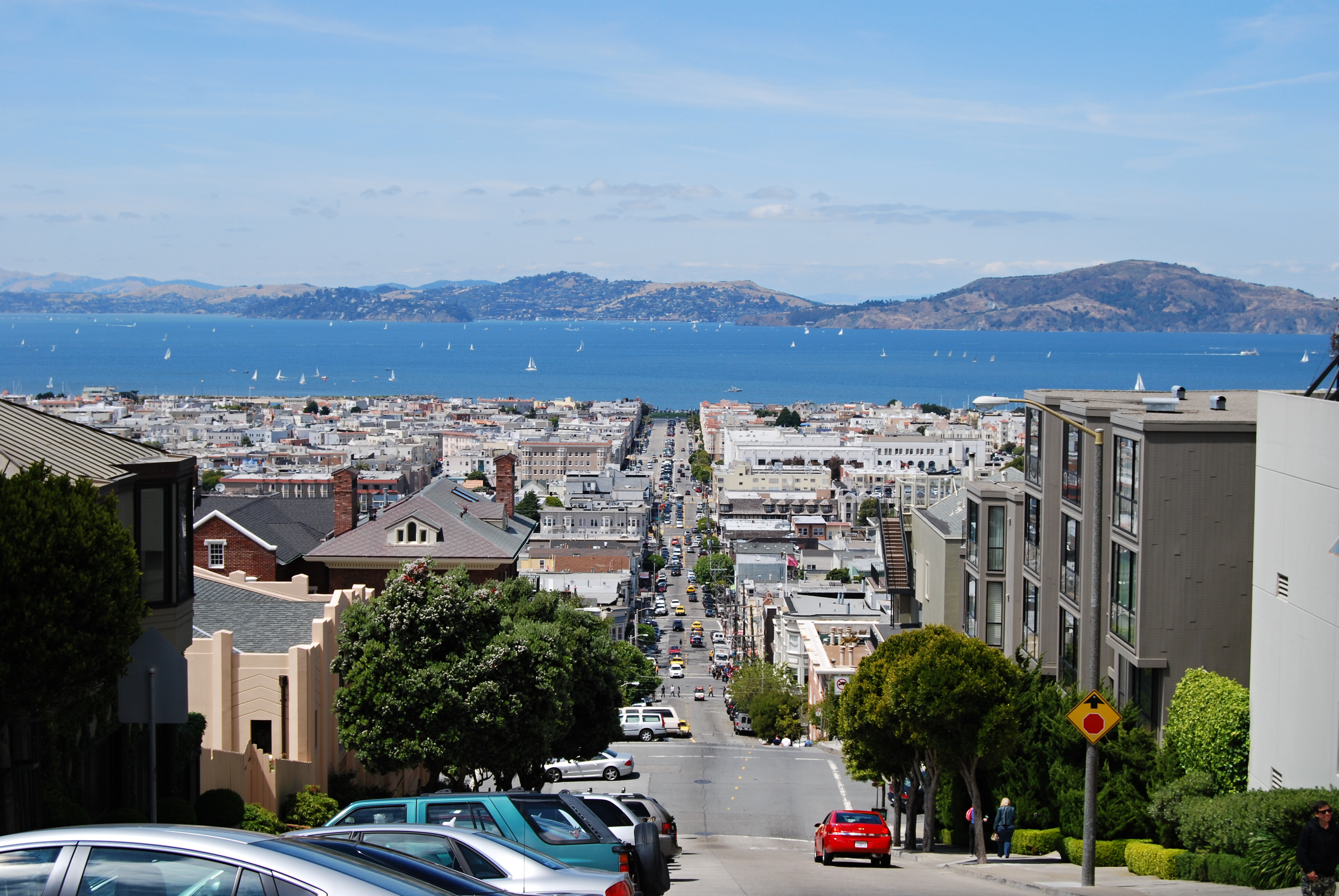
View north along Fillmore towards San Francisco Bay and Marin County, taken north of the intersection with Broadway (2009); the steep grade is apparent.

By September 1912, the preliminary engineering design was complete and legal work began to acquire the properties needed to widen Fillmore at the north and south portals. In December, the San Francisco Call reported that plans for the Fillmore Street Tunnel were almost completed, and estimated that construction would begin the following Spring; according to City Engineer M.M. O'Shaughnessy, the tunnel would take approximately 11 months to complete and would have been ready by Spring 1914. The Fillmore Street Tunnel Property Owners' association was formed that month to advocate for the tunnel's construction.

On February 24, 1913, the Board of Supervisors unanimously adopted a resolution to build a streetcar line on Van Ness Avenue (completed in 1914 as the D Geary-Van Ness) and construct the Fillmore Street Tunnel. Arnold's report to the City of San Francisco, submitted in March 1913, urged "the Fillmore Street tunnel should be built immediately, extending from Sutter Street to Filbert Street, with the necessary street-widening at portals to preserve the roadways at either side for street-cars, traffic, and sidewalks." The proposed Fillmore tunnel offered the best combination of grade and level despite its relatively long length. In May 1913, the lands and tunnels committee were beset by property owners in the special assessment districts demanding to know what their levies would be, bringing further progress to a halt. The number of protests led at least one supervisor to propose the cost should be spread city-wide instead of two special assessment districts. O'Shaughnessy quashed rumors the Fillmore Street Tunnel would cost $6–10 million, stating that his estimate was less than $3 million based on detailed designs his office was preparing in June 1913.

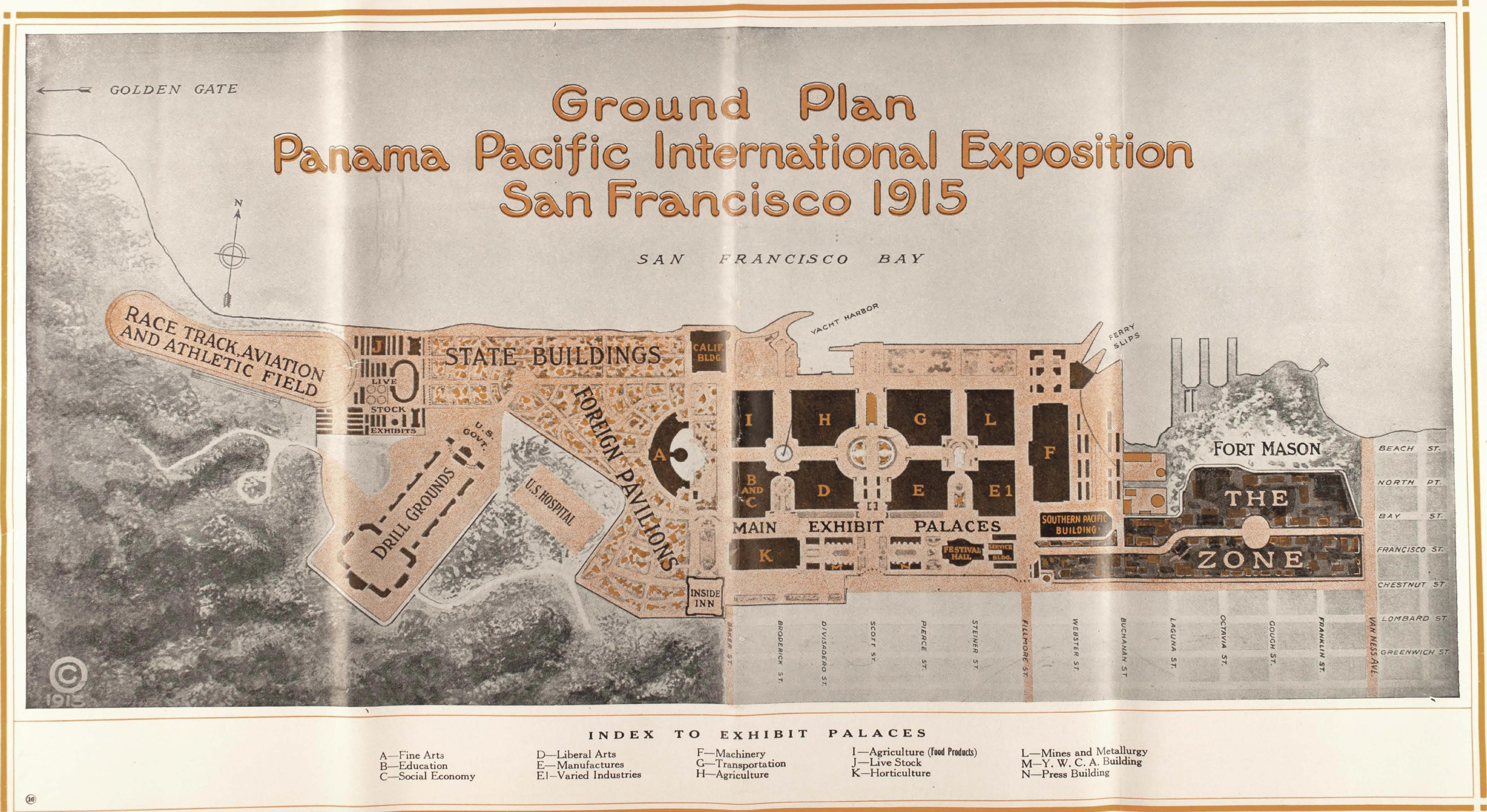
Plan of the Panama–Pacific International Exposition grounds at Harbor View; Fillmore connects just to the right of the phrase "main exhibit palaces".

Although the tunnel had not started construction by June 1913, the Call confidently predicted that work would begin that fall; upon completion, 80% of San Francisco's residents would have direct access to the central gate for the Panama–Pacific Exposition via the proposed tunnel. Plans were also announced that Robert Dollar Steamship Company would add large concrete docks to Harbor View once the fair had concluded, giving more support for the Fillmore Street Tunnel, leading to notable real estate speculation along Fillmore.

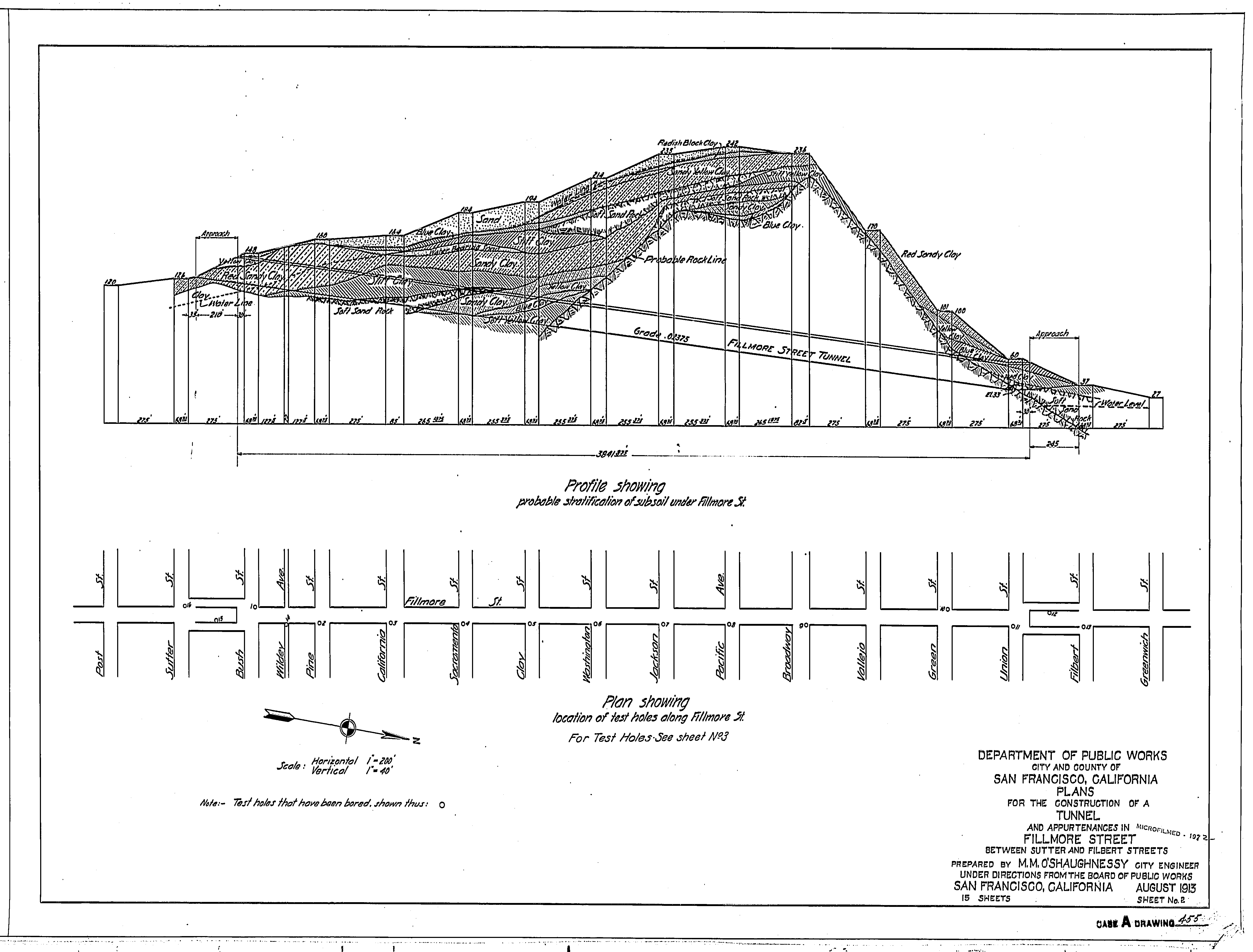
Cutaway profile of Fillmore Street Tunnel project (1913)

However, the final design for the tunnel continued to be delayed until August, leaving little time for construction to complete prior to the exposition. In addition, costs were expected to be relatively high: while the Twin Peaks tunnel had been contracted for $4 million, the shorter Fillmore tunnel was expected to cost $2.9 million because of its greater complexity and width. Tunnel advocates appealed directly to Mayor Rolph and asserted the $2.9 million estimate was overly conservative, meaning the special assessment, estimated at $1 per square foot of property, should be closer to $0.08/ft^{2} instead. In a late push to build support, The Call ran stories throughout 1913 featuring supportive citizens, businessmen, and property owners in the assessment districts.

Despite these efforts, by September the directors of the PPIE firmly opposed the tunnel, saying that construction activities would disrupt the exposition and that it would not be ready by 1915. One of the original advocates for the tunnel, Samuel Adelstein, now also opposed the tunnel's construction, as he felt the improvement district levies for his property was disproportionately large. Believing that it could not be finished in time for the exposition, the Board of Supervisors adopted a resolution to abandon the Fillmore Tunnel project in mid-September; by that time, the estimated start of construction had slipped to July 1914.

== Design ==
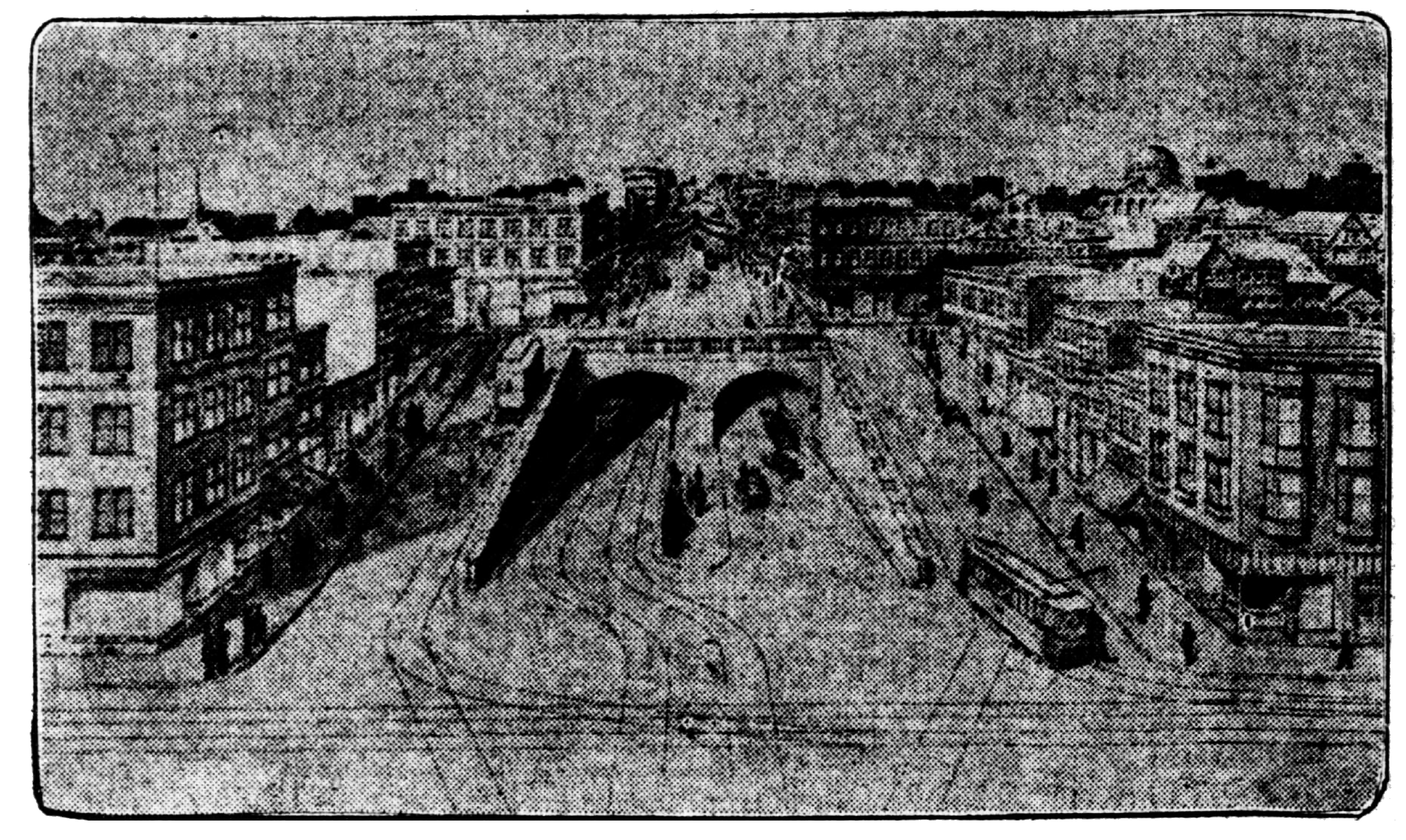
South portal (at Sutter)

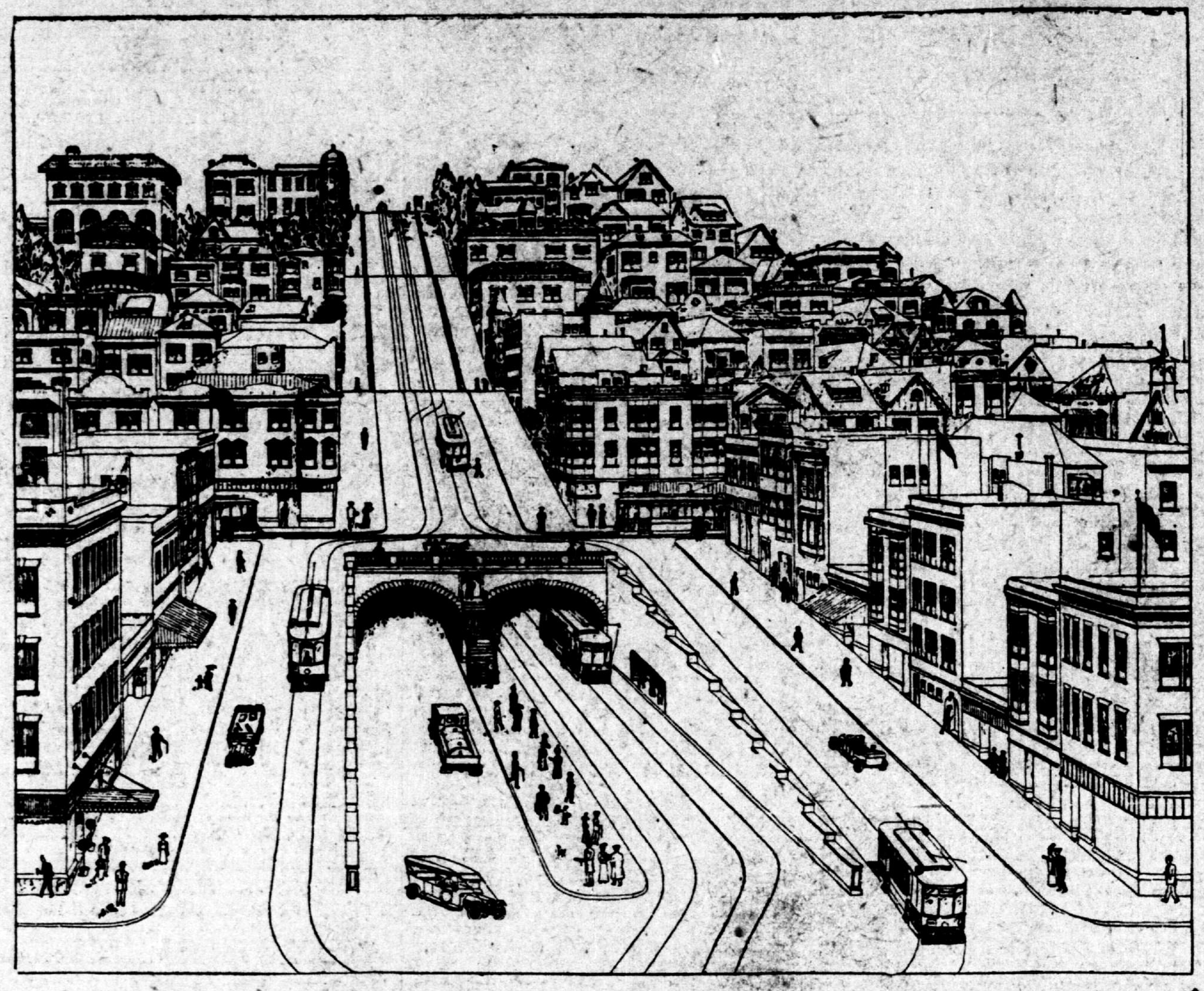
North portal (at Filbert)

Artist's renditions of the Fillmore Street Tunnel portals (1912–3)

The tunnel was to run 4,332 feet (1,320 m) from Sutter to Filbert, including approaches. Its design was divided into two bores: one was 29 feet (8.8 m) wide for pedestrian and rail traffic, and the other bore was 25 feet (7.6 m) wide with three vehicle lanes. The maximum vertical clearance within the tunnel as designed was 19 feet (5.8 m) at the center of each bore. When completed, the maximum grade along Fillmore would have been reduced to 2.3 percent; an alternative, constructing a balanced cable way on the surface, would require a maximum 25.4 percent grade. Arnold's study, which included considering alternative routes for both low-level tunnels along Steiner (from Pine to Union) and Divisadero (from Pine to Lombard), and high-level tunnels along Divsiadero (Sacramento to Greenwich) and Broadway (Mason to Larkin), concluded the Fillmore tunnel offered the best (low-level) approach and grade, but would cost significantly more than the similar Stockton Street Tunnel due to its additional length and bore size.

The design would have widened Fillmore along the two blocks at either end (between Bush and Sutter on the south, and between Union and Filbert on the north) to accommodate the approaches; the existing URR Fillmore line would continue to run over the hill. In the initial plan, the tunnel was to be bored from the north using a tunneling shield, with the material removed to be used as fill to reclaim land at Harbor View.

Several test wells were drilled along the proposed route to determine the composition of the hill. Although most of the test bores encountered only sand and clay, near the crest of the hill at Broadway, the drill encountered broken rock 23 feet (7.0 m) below the surface and would not go further.
