= Fillmore Counterbalance =

Streetcar device

Overview
- Other name: Fillmore-Street Line
- Locale: San Francisco, California

Service
- Operator: Market Street Railway/United Railroads

History
- Opened: August 5, 1895; 131 years ago
- Closed: April 5, 1941; 85 years ago

Technical
- Track length: 3,100 ft (940 m) (B'way to Bay); 700 ft (210 m) (B'way to Green)
- Number of tracks: 2
- Character: Combination electric & cable-hauled streetcar

The Fillmore Counterbalance was a streetcar device operated by the Market Street Railway (MSRy) in San Francisco. It aided the company's 22 Fillmore line in traversing the steep northern slope of Fillmore Street from 1895 to 1941. The weight of a descending car helped lift ascending cars. It was a unique operation for its use of mechanical cable haulage for an otherwise electrically-powered route.

== Design ==
Key locations on the Fillmore Street Hill Line
1 Northern terminus (Bay)
2 End of cable loop (Green)
3 Southern terminus (Broadway)

The Counterbalance line ran along Fillmore from the top of the hill at Broadway north to Bay. For the two southernmost blocks between Broadway and Green, the Counterbalance used a looping underground cable that allowed descending cars to assist ascending cars. The grades on the three steepest blocks served by the Fillmore Counterbalance range from 14 1/2 to 25 1/2%. (Note: Specifically, from north to south: Union to Green, 14 1/2%; Green to Vallejo, 24 1/2% to 25 1/2%; Vallejo to Broadway, 24%; From Green to Vallejo, the ground climbs 70 ft (21 m), and from Vallejo to Broadway, the ground climbs another 76 ft (23 m).) Northbound (descending) cars used their motors during the two-block descent; the weight of the descending car assisted the southbound (ascending) car. At the north and south ends of the cable line, the cars would release from the cable, letting the onboard electric motors and momentum carry them to the respective termini.

The looping underground cable was routed around two sheaves placed in brick vaults underneath Fillmore, one just south of Broadway and the other south of Green. The cable did not move freely – a band brake was used at the southern sheave at Broadway (the top of the hill) to control speed. Two steel carriages attached to the cable each ran on a track below a slot at the surface. Each carriage had a rod with an eye at the top protruding through the slot. To connect to the cable system, a long V-shaped attachment, free to rise and fall with grade changes, was added to each streetcar serving the route. This attachment could be connected to the eye with a bolt. An ascending car arriving at Green and a descending car at Broadway would each connect to the system, and the descending car would drive the mechanism using its electric traction system. (If the descending car turned its motor off at any point, both cars would stop.) According to a Market Street Railway official, it would be impossible to stop a car running downhill using the onboard brakes if it was not attached to the cable, as the wheels would skid faster than they could roll. A railroad switch at Green allowed cars to move between the ascending and descending tracks.

The line was served by the smallest streetcars in San Francisco: California-type "dinkies" with a single truck, built by the Hammond Car Company.

== History ==
MSRy announced their plan to continue the electric streetcar line from Broadway to Union via cable-haulage in May 1895. The Counterbalance line was tested with two cars on August 5 of that year, and called "a perfect success from the start". Soon after MSRy inaugurated service, hooks were added to the streetcars operating the Fillmore & 16th Street line so they could take advantage of the Counterbalance all the way to the end of the line at Bay Street. When MSRy was reorganized to incorporate several private rivals as the United Railroads of San Francisco (URR) in 1902, the line was split so that Counterbalance cars exclusively worked north of Broadway, and regular streetcars operated south of there.

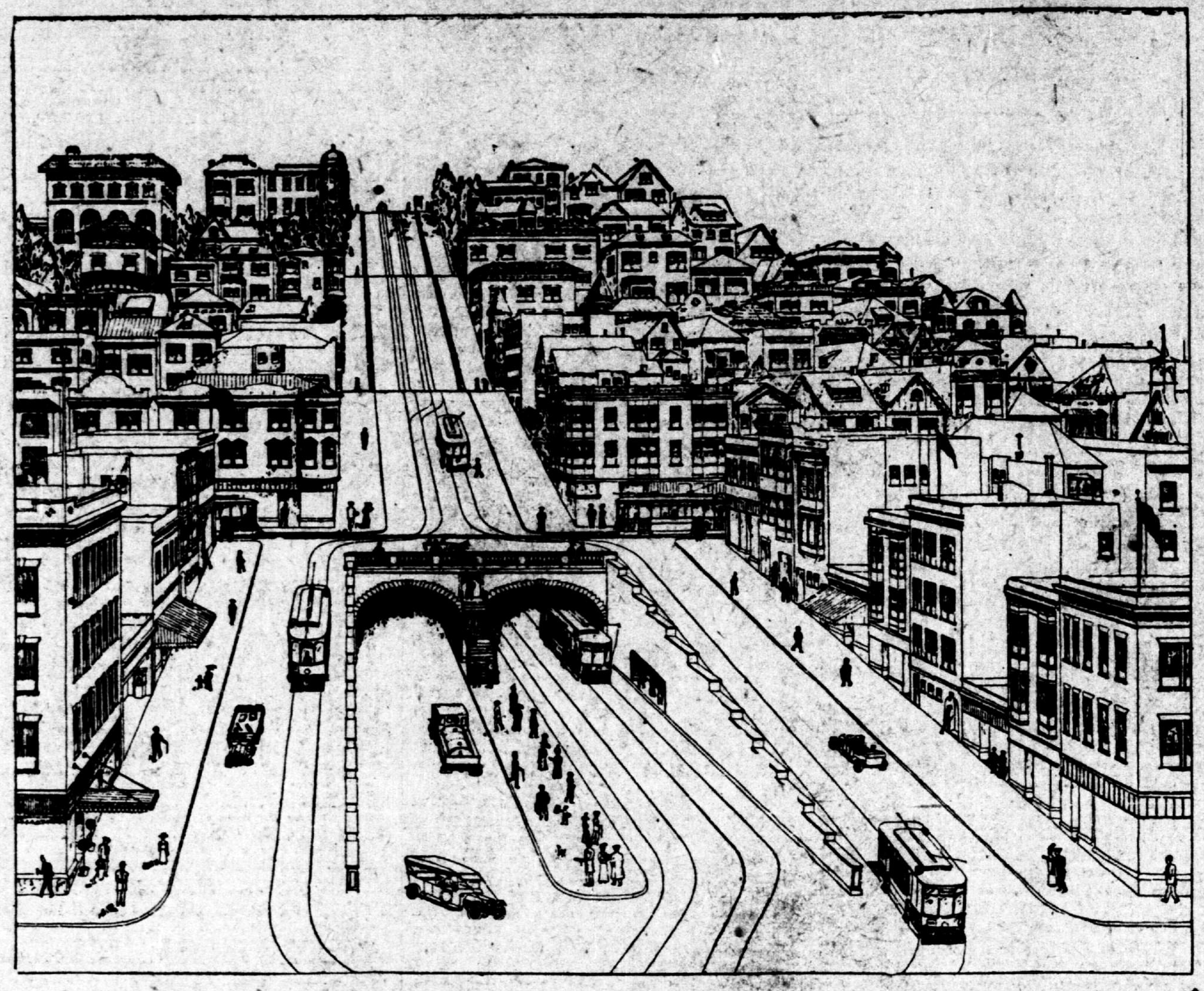
Artist's rendering of the proposed north portal of the never-built Fillmore Street Tunnel at Filbert, showing rail service through the tunnel alongside continued Fillmore Counterbalance service on the surface

Consultant Bion J. Arnold had recommended in April 1912 that a tunnel underneath Fillmore should be built to serve the increased passenger demands resulting from the 1915 Panama–Pacific International Exposition and at about the same time the City Attorney concluded that a new Fillmore Street Tunnel would not violate the existing franchise granted to MSRy/URR. However, the tunnel was delayed and cancelled in September 1913; instead, URR rebuilt fourteen of the Fillmore Hill dinkies and operated them in two-car trainsets to improve capacity over the route; the original open bodies were enclosed, air brakes were added, and multiple unit controls were installed. The system was upgraded for two-car operation by installing a heavier cable and redesigned grip. Maximum throughput was increased from 6,000 to 8,000 passengers per hour.

The Counterbalance was shut down after its last day of operation on April 5, 1941, prior to the Muni takeover of MSRy in 1944; Muni converted the streetcar route to trolleybus service in 1949 as the 22 Fillmore line, which continues to this day.

=== Accidents ===
On the evening of December 23, 1901, Mary Phelan was killed in a collision on the Fillmore Counterbalance that left nine others injured. Car no. 757, which was carrying approximately fifteen passengers, suddenly slid north down the hill without warning from its starting position at Broadway. At the time, two cars were stopped at Green: one on the opposite track, waiting for a descending car to help carry it up, and another at the switch between tracks; the conductors of these two cars, seeing no. 757 plunging down the hill, alerted their passengers, who escaped to safety. No. 757 collided with the car stopped at the switch at Green, staving in the left side of the stationary car and throwing it off the tracks; no. 757 continued downward after the collision, jumping its tracks and running on the cobblestone street until it collided with a telegraph pole at Union. Mayor-elect Eugene Schmitz witnessed the accident from his home and called the offices of the Market Street Railway, asking them to send medical help.

The initial investigation blamed the conductor for uncoupling no. 757 from the underground cable; the car had just come up the hill and was about to make a return trip down due to a prior accident that had delayed operations. A subsequent court hearing found that while the conductor failed to couple the car to the cable properly, he was not faulted because the timer had rung the signal bell prematurely, prompting the motorman to start operation before the Counterbalance was ready.

Additional accidents followed. In October 1907, the ascending car detached from the cable, causing the two descending cars to plunge "down the hill at a terrific pace". Brake failure caused a car to plunge downhill in May 1914. In June 1915, the motorman lost control of a descending car while halfway down the hill; according to initial reports, the descending car jumped the tracks at Green and collided with an ascending car. It was later clarified the descending train had received a premature signal to release the cable, causing a two-car ascending train to reverse direction and smash into an ascending train behind it at Green; conductors had tried to minimize casualties by herding passengers to the ends away from the collision, and opening the doors to allow some passengers to jump from the cars. In August 1915, ex-Mayor Schmitz was involved in another Fillmore accident when the automobile in which he was riding was struck by a Fillmore car at Vallejo.

Sun-softened pavement was credited with slowing a runaway car and preventing a more serious accident when it came off the rails in July 1918. In November 1921, a two-story house at 2924-2926 Fillmore was jolted off its foundations after a runaway downhill Counterbalance car left the tracks at Union and smashed into the building.

== See also ==
- Great Incline, a similar contemporaneous line on Mount Lowe near Pasadena (1893–1938)
- Queen Anne Counterbalance, a similar contemporaneous line in Seattle (1901–40)
