= Stockton Street Subway =

Stockton Street Subway may refer to:

- Central Subway (San Francisco), running under Stockton Street in San Francisco
- Stockton Street Tunnel, currently carrying automobile traffic in San Francisco
