= 22 Fillmore =

Trolleybus route in San Francisco, California

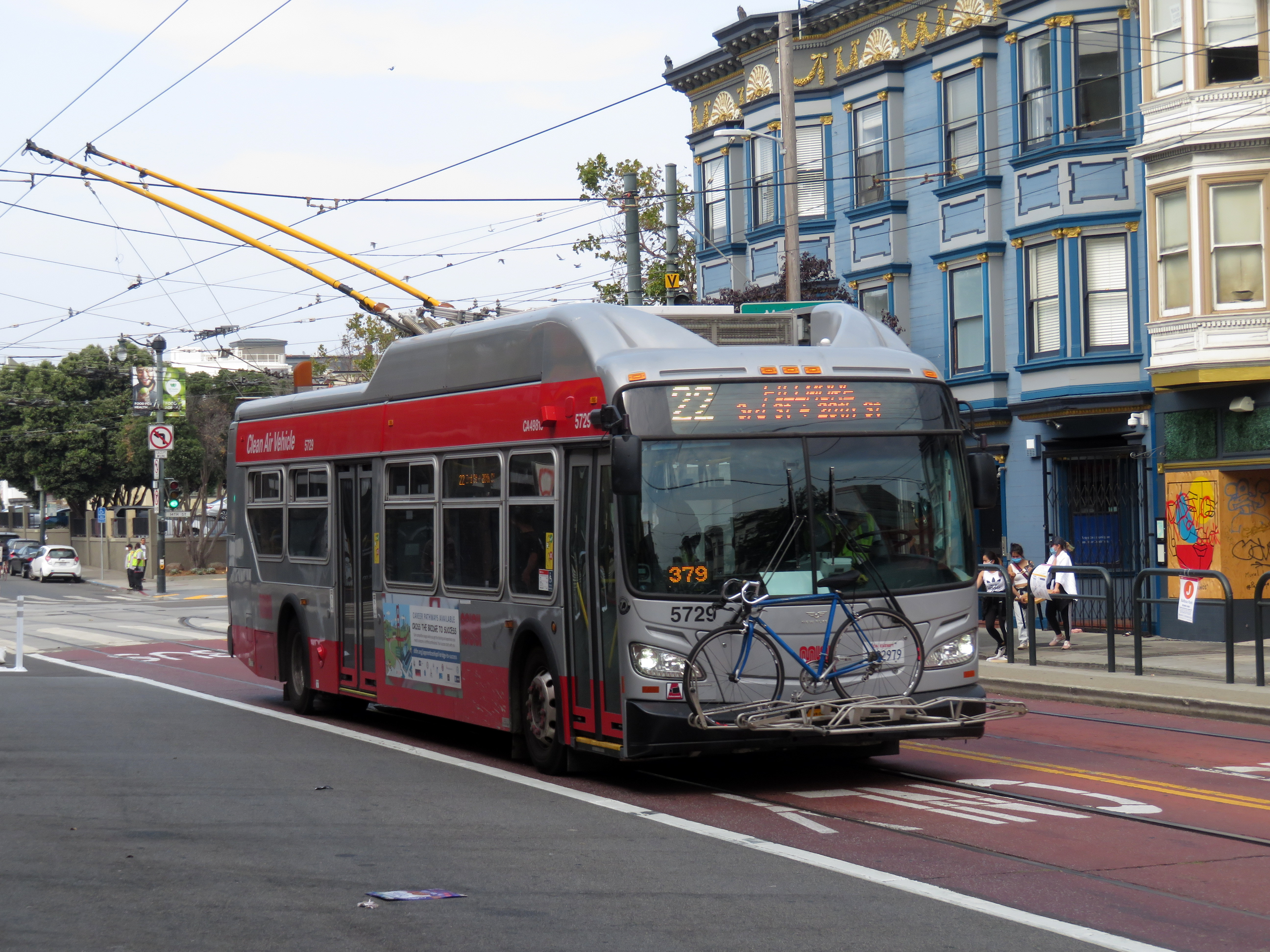
- 22 trolleybus on Church Street, August 2020

Overview
- System: Muni trolleybus network
- Operator: San Francisco Municipal Railway
- Garage: Potrero
- Vehicle: New Flyer XT40
- Began service: July 1895
- Night-time: 30m frequency

Route
- Locale: San Francisco, California
- Start: Fillmore and Bay
- Via: Fillmore St, 16th St
- End: Mission Bay North and Third Street
- Length: 5.6 miles (9.0 km)

Service
- Level: Daily
- Frequency: 6–7m
- Weekend frequency: 8–9m
- Operates: 24 hours
- Daily ridership: 16,000 (2019)
- Map: 22 Fillmore Map

22 Fillmore is a trolleybus line operated by the San Francisco Municipal Railway (Muni). It connects the Marina District to Mission Bay in San Francisco.

== Route description ==
The line operates mostly on Fillmore Street and 16th Street, using Hermann and Church Streets to transition between the two. A short segment near the northern end of the line runs one block west of Fillmore on Steiner. The outbound terminal is listed as Fillmore and Bay, although inbound buses continue further north, stopping at Jefferson before turning around and doubling back before running south to Mission Bay.

The route operates 24 hours with less frequent Owl service overnight as part of the All Nighter network.

== History ==
Fillmore Counterbalance section of the route, where electric trolleys operated via cable haulage, early 1900s

Streetcar service on the line started in July 1895, running from 16th and Folsom Streets to Fillmore and Broadway. Running further north required a means to traverse the steep 24.54% grade of Pacific Heights. Thus the line was uniquely equipped with a funicular-style mechanism between Broadway and Green whereby a descending streetcar would provide counterweight for an ascending car by coupling both to a shared cable. The Fillmore Street counterbalance opened the following month. This section limited frequency and scheduling on the entire route as it required two passing cars to meet up at the appropriate points for the mechanism to operate.

The funicular segment was replaced with shuttle buses in 1941, diverting from the route a block to the west to avoid the steep grade. Streetcar service along the whole line ended in the early hours of August 1, 1948. The route was changed slightly to use Hermann Street rather than Duboce Avenue to jog between Church Street and Fillmore Street. After a few months of temporary motor coach service while work to modify the overhead wires took place, the route was converted to trolleybuses on January 16, 1949.

By 2016, very few further changes had occurred to the routing since the first streetcars ran a century earlier. The eastern/southern terminus of the line was moved from the Dogpatch to Mission Bay in January 2021.

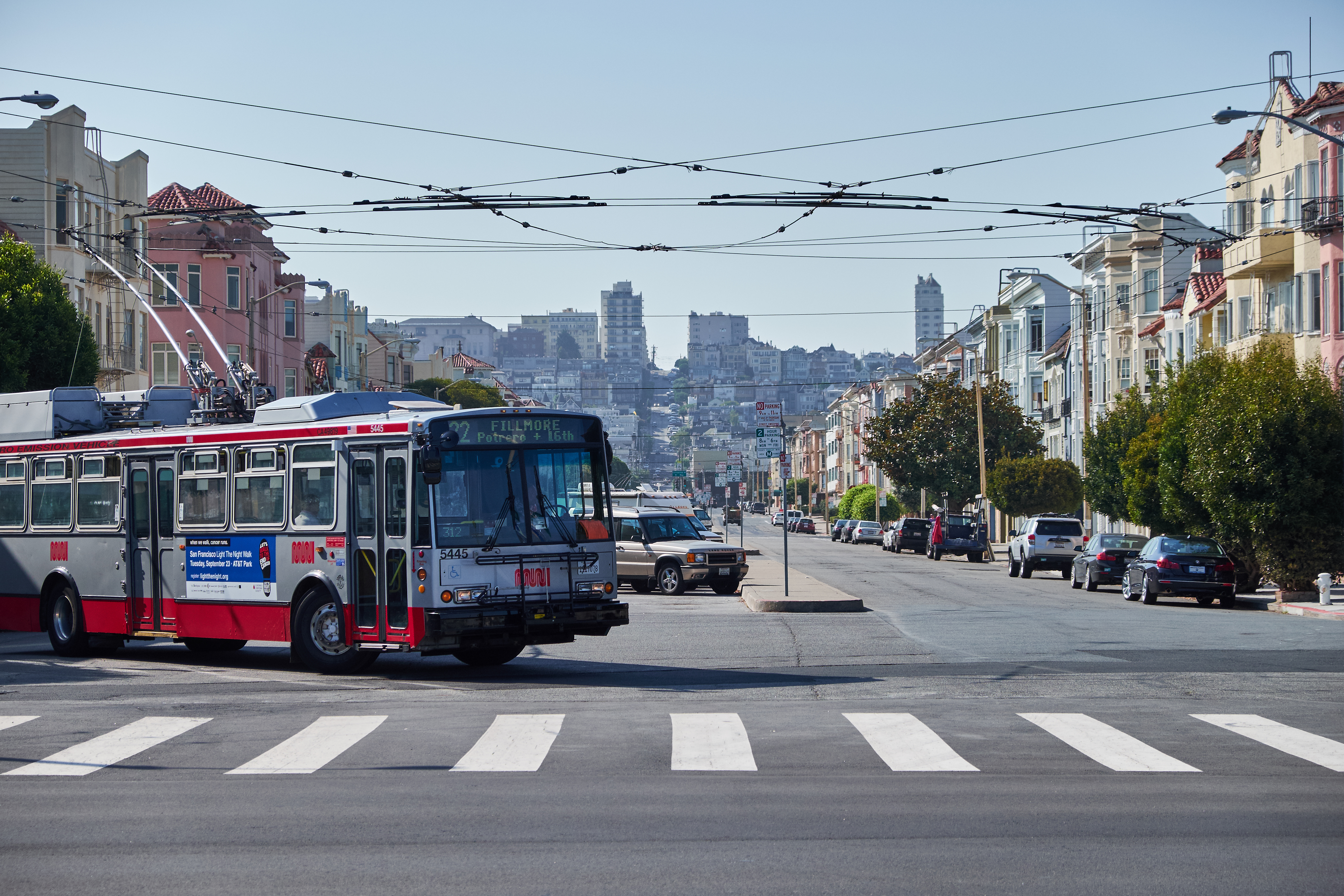
Turning around at the line's outbound end at Fillmore and Marina Boulevard
