= St. Vincent de Paul Church, San Francisco =

Church in San Francisco, United States

Coordinates: 37.79626°N 122.43727°W

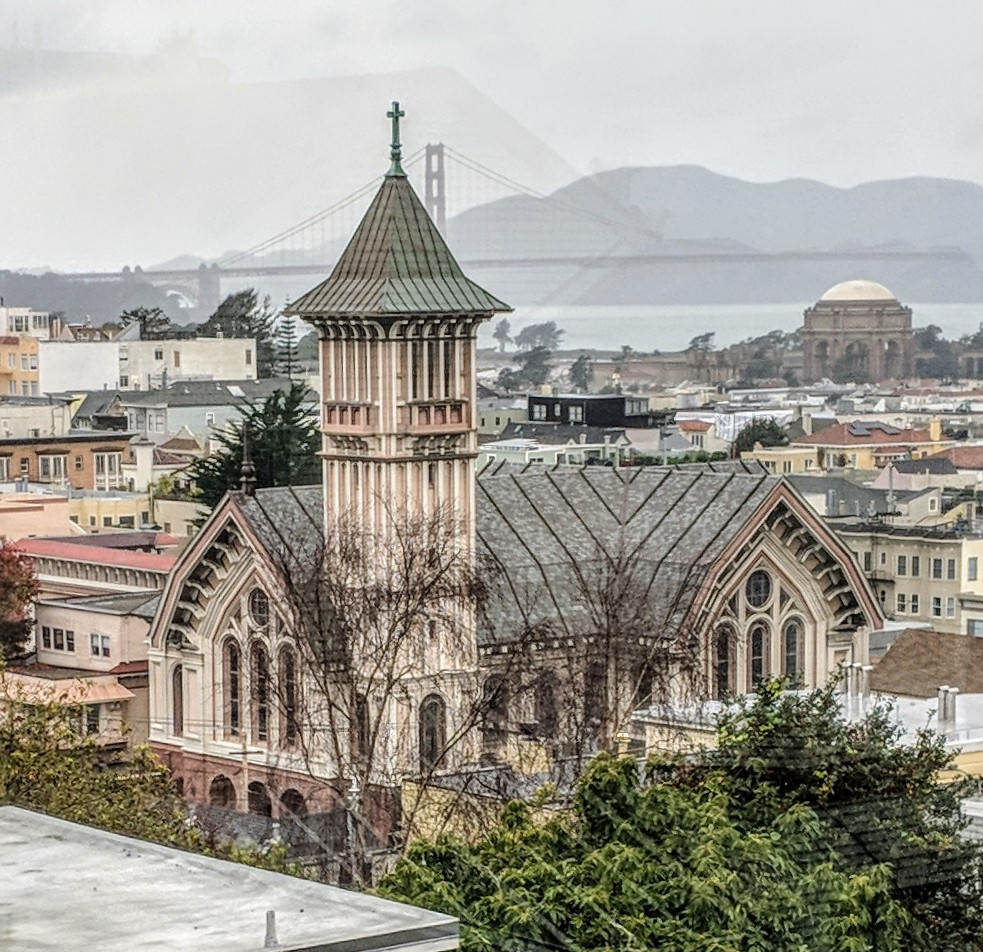
St. Vincent de Paul Church, as seen from Pacific Heights. The Golden Gate Bridge is in the background.

St. Vincent de Paul Church in San Francisco, California, is a Roman Catholic parish situated in Cow Hollow, located at 2320 Green St. (at Steiner).

== History ==
The parish was formed by Archbishop Patrick W. Riordan on August 24, 1901. The first Mass was offered in a storefront hall on Fillmore Street on September 22, 1901 by Father Martin Ryan, the first Pastor. In 1902 the rectory and a one-story church over a hall was built at the present site at Green and Steiner. Both structures survived the earthquake of 1906. In 1911, work began on the superstructure, which is the present church.

Today, the church serves approximately 2400 individuals and families that call it their parish and one of the most active Catholic Young Adults Groups in the Archdiocese of San Francisco and greater California.

== Notable people ==
- Nancy Pelosi, longtime parishioner and politician
