= Stockton Street Tunnel =

Road tunnel in San Francisco

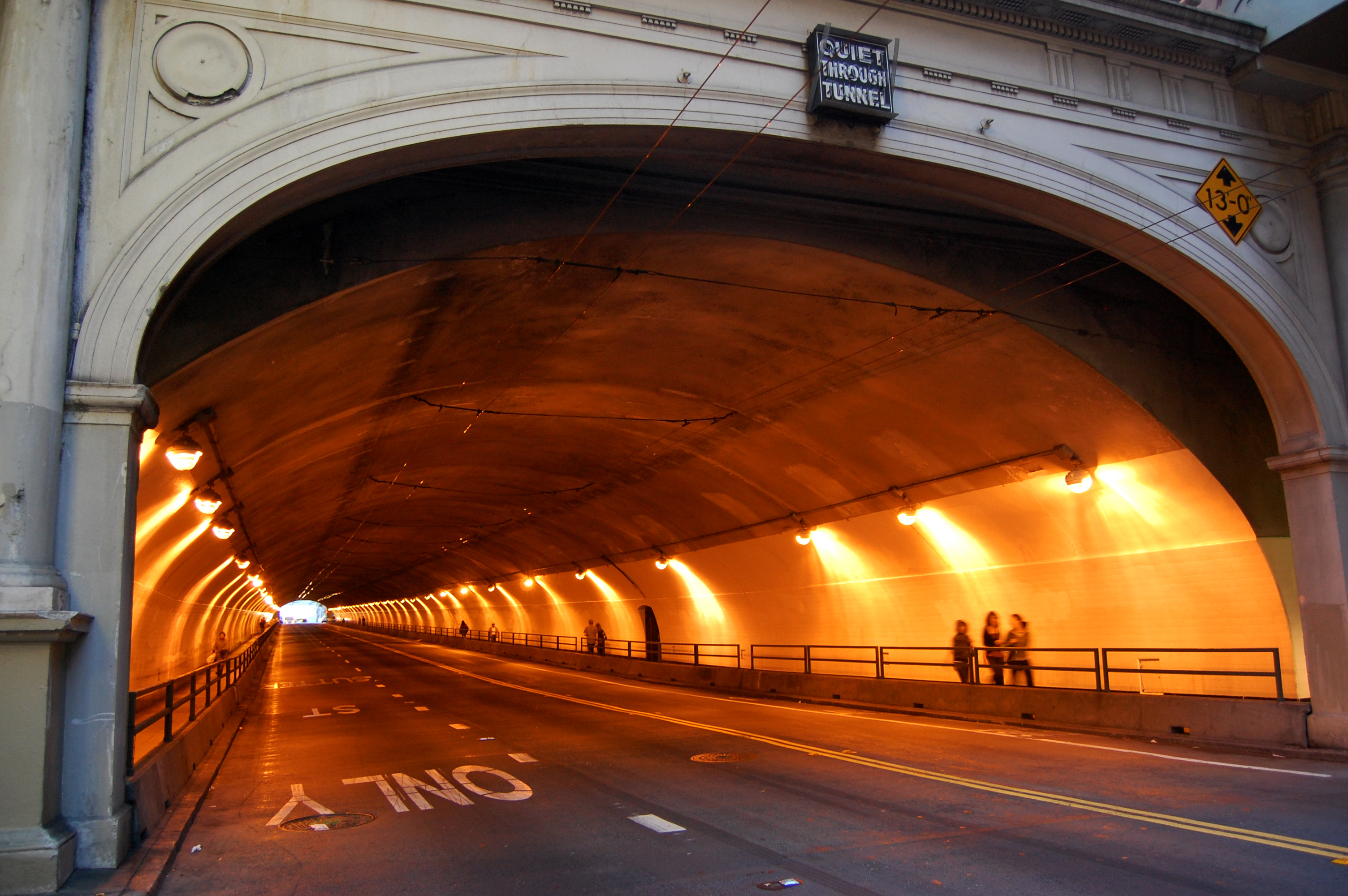

Overview
- Location: Nob Hill, San Francisco, California
- Coordinates: 37.7915°N 122.4074°W
- Route: Stockton Street
- Start: Bush Street
- End: Sacramento Street

Operation
- Opened: December 29, 1914
- Owner: City of San Francisco
- Operator: City of San Francisco
- Traffic: Automotive and pedestrian

Technical
- Length: 911 feet (278 m)
- No. of lanes: 3
- Electrified: 600 V DC parallel overhead lines (Muni Trolleybus)
- Tunnel clearance: 13 feet (4 m)
- Width: 50 feet (15 m)

The Stockton Street Tunnel is a tunnel in San Francisco, California, which carries its namesake street underneath a section of Nob Hill near Chinatown for about three blocks. It was opened in 1914. The south portal is located at Bush Street, which is about two blocks to the north of Union Square. The north portal is located at the Sacramento Street intersection.

== Design ==
The tunnel was built to decrease the grade through the hill. Before the tunnel was built, the maximum grade along the route of Stockton Street north from its intersection with Sutter was 18% and the maximum grade south from the intersection with Sacramento was 12%. The tunnel was built with a maximum grade of 4.29% between Sacramento and Sutter. Initial plans in 1909 called for a tunnel 1,400 feet (430 m) long. The planned tunnel was shortened in 1910 to 750 feet (230 m), with a width of 55 feet (17 m) and a height of 25 feet (7.6 m), with stairways to connect the tunnel with Pine and California streets. The bore was narrowed slightly in 1912, with a total planned width of 42 feet (13 m) and a height of 18 feet (5.5 m).

Construction involved lowering Stockton Street near where it passes into the tunnel from the south, evidence for which can still be seen at the building of 417 Stockton Street (Mystic Hotel), where the basement became the ground floor and the former front door is now a visibly marked window bay on the second floor.

== History ==
The tunnel was primarily built for the streetcars of the now defunct F Stockton line. A petition was filed for a new streetcar line by Frank Stringham, representing an unnamed group of investors, with the San Francisco Board of Supervisors on January 23, 1909. Their intent was to create a nearly level route connecting North Beach with the downtown area. George Skaller later took credit for the initial push for a tunnel, saying that the city had studied the idea for at least 20 years, but would never be built as "all city enterprises, on account of the long and windy red tape connected with city enterprises" were doomed by bureaucracy. Stockton was favored over Grant, which was seen as too narrow, or Kearny, which already was franchised to the United Railways.

Although Skaller initially hoped to raise private funding for the tunnel, the Board of Supervisors imposed a requirement allowing the city to take over the railway after ten years at its physical valuation, and no private investors were willing to fund the project. Instead, Skaller turned to the idea of public funding through a special assessment district, labeling the project as an "improvement" for existing roads. The Stockton Street Tunnel Association launched its fundraising campaign in May 1910, hoping to raise $450,000 (equivalent to $15,550,000 in 2025) to cover construction costs by creating a special assessment district to fund the improvements. The estimated assessment for a lot 25 by 100 feet (7.6 by 30.5 m) was $62.50 in 1910 (equivalent to $2,160 in 2025). The project adopted the slogan "The open door to North Beach" in May 1910.

The Stockton Street Railway franchise was relinquished to the city in 1910, and suggestions were made that if ferries from Marin would land in North Beach instead of the Ferry Building, the resulting rise in local property values would offset the cost of the assessment. Two assessment districts were set up, in North Beach and Downtown, and projected traffic was estimated to reach 50,000 to 75,000 passengers per hour during the Panama–Pacific International Exposition of 1915. The precedent set by the assessment districts for the Stockton Street Tunnel sparked interest in building a similar tunnel under Fillmore Street and leveling Rincon Hill to increase usable land, but these added works were not carried through.

Final plans for the tunnel were filed by city engineer Marsden Manson in March 1912. By June 1912, the final legal and funding issues were being resolved, and work was to start "within 30 or 60 days." In July 1913, excavation of the bore was planned to take 100 days. During construction, hotel guests were kept awake by work at night and at least one worker was killed by a cave-in. Revenue service through the tunnel was inaugurated by Mayor James Rolph on December 29, 1914.

Streetcar service through the tunnel ended on January 20, 1951, and was re-designated as route 30. Tracks were removed, but electrified overhead wires were retained for trolleybus service.

In 1984, prodded by Chinatown advocates, San Francisco added safety rails for the sidewalk, new lighting, and waterproofing, after a pedestrian was killed by an automobile.

== Gallery ==
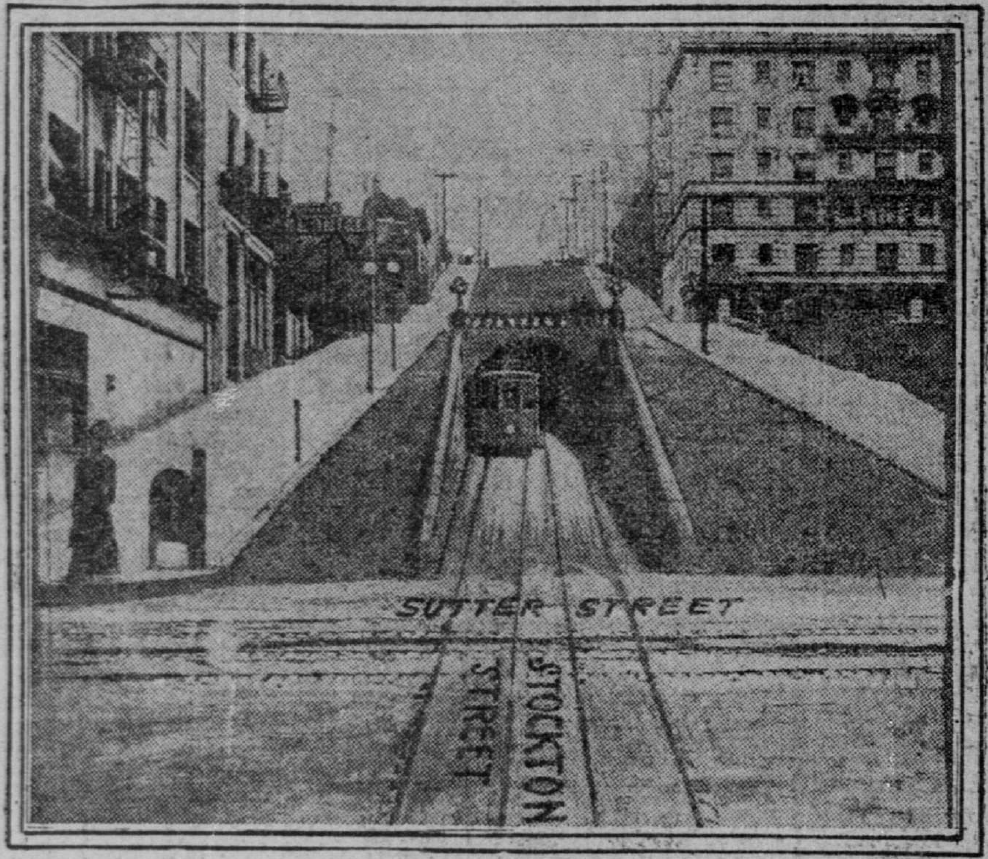
Initial design of south portal (1909)

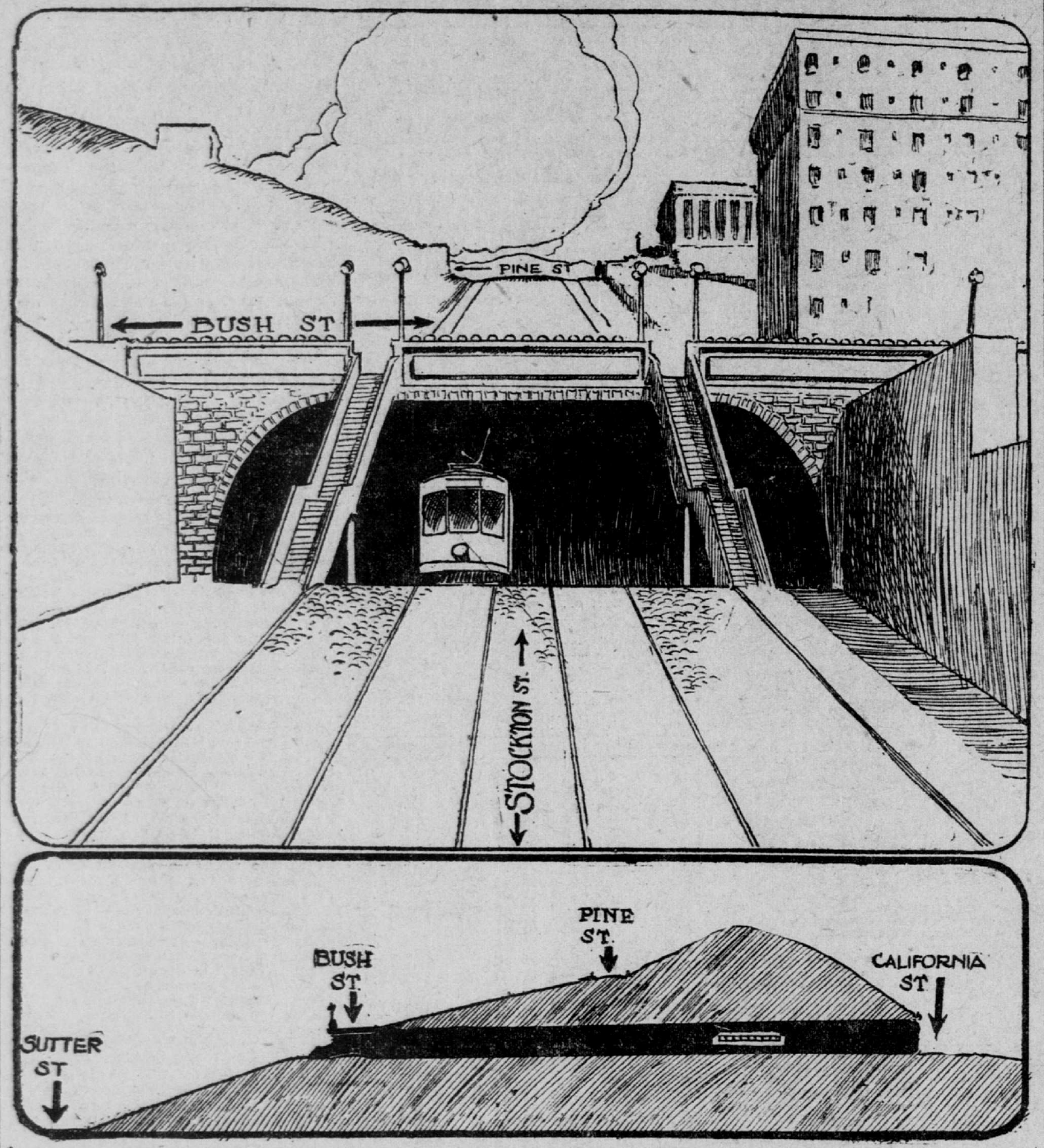
Updated south portal (1910)

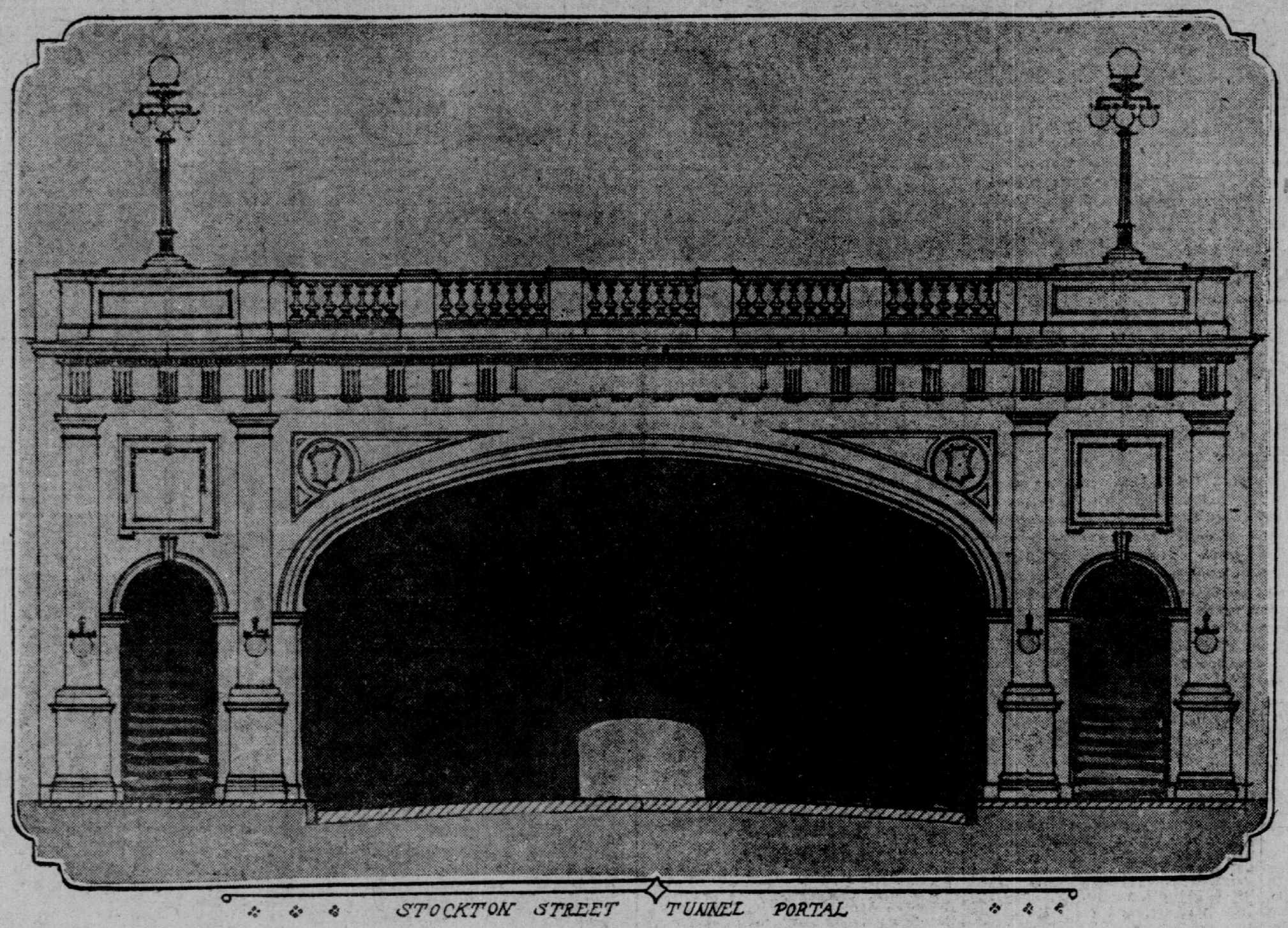
Final south portal design (1912)

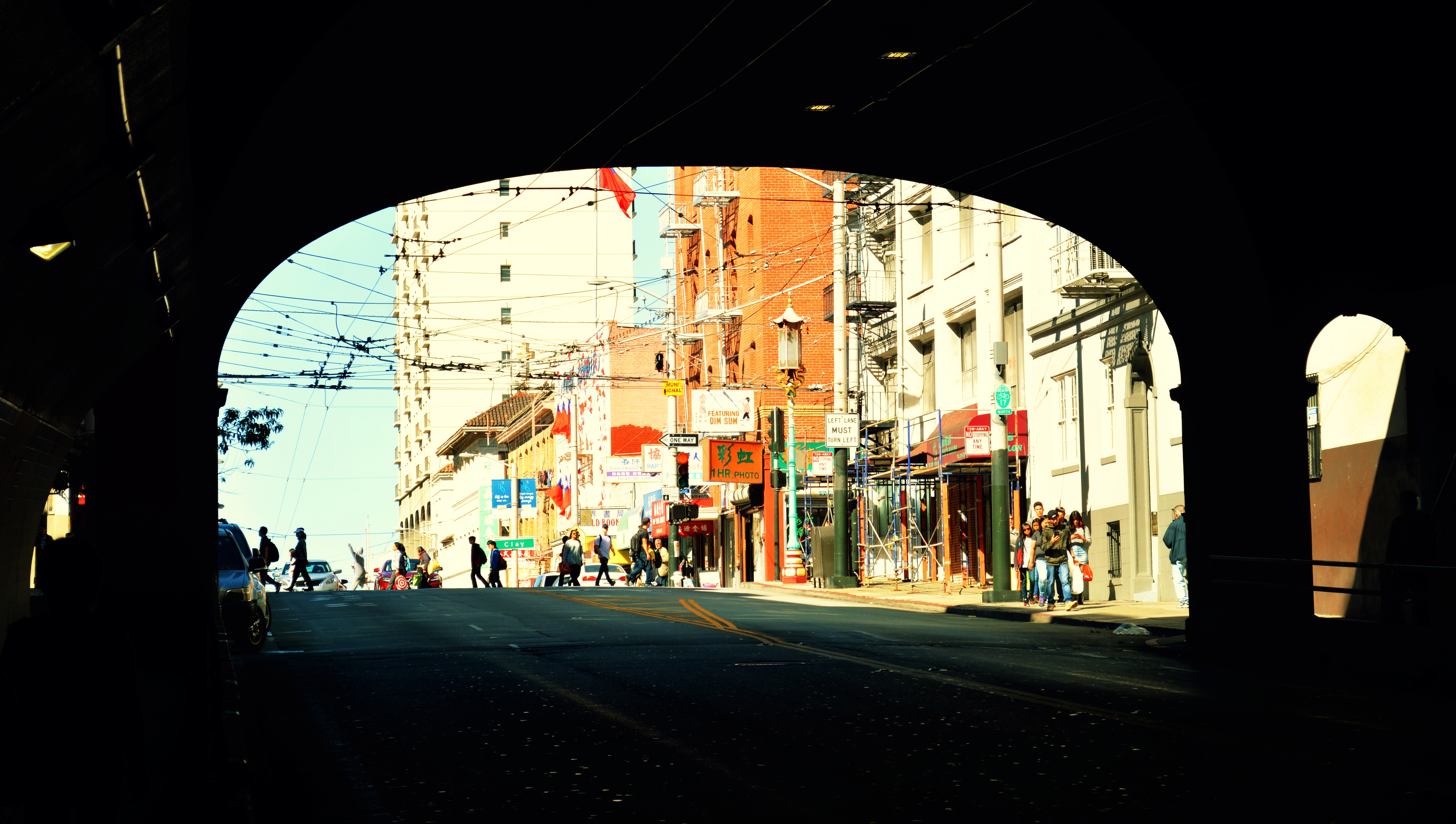
North portal from within the tunnel, Chinatown (2016)

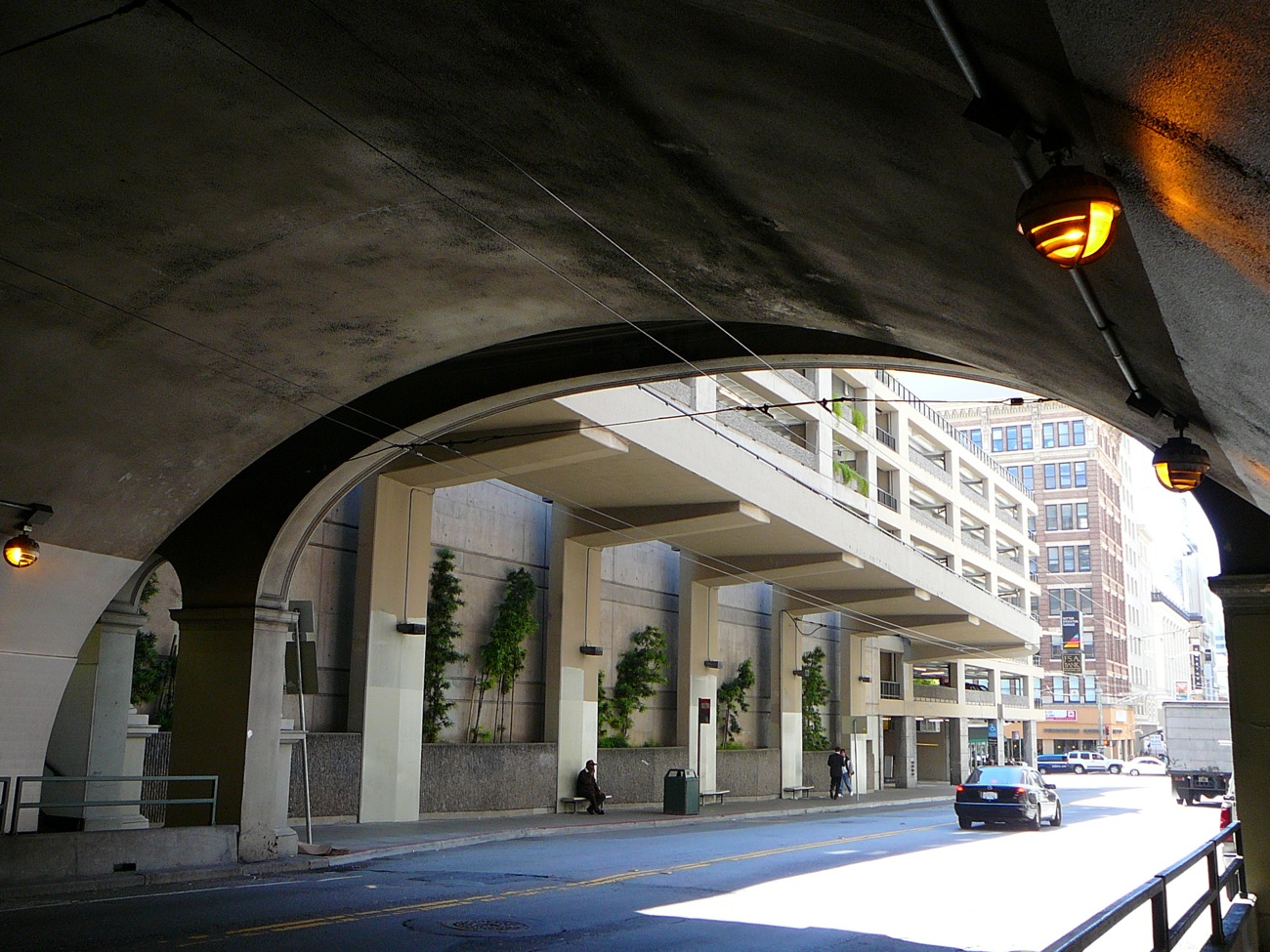
Looking out through the south portal (2007)

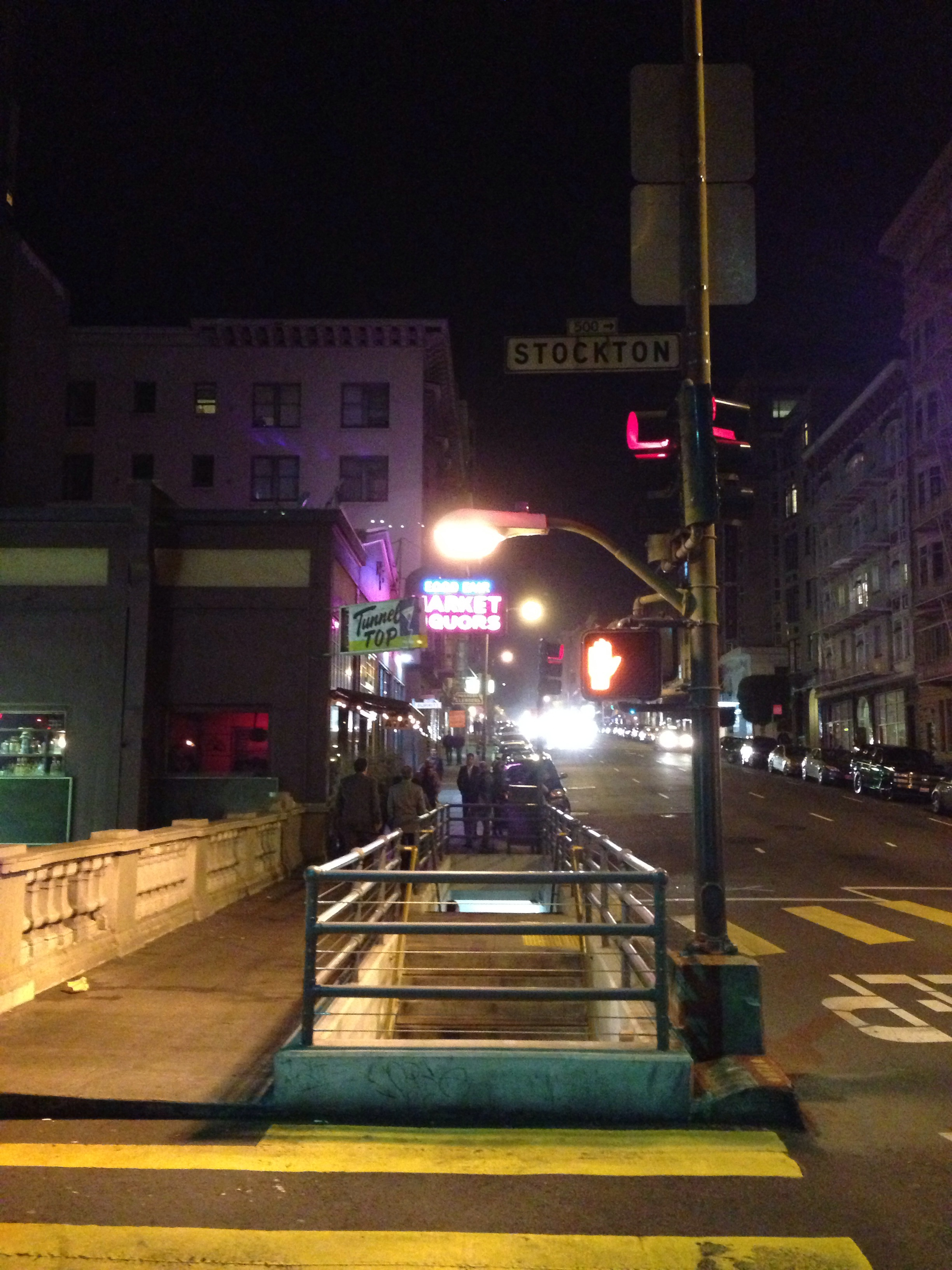
Top of stairs connecting upper Stockton Street with lower Stockton Street (2013)

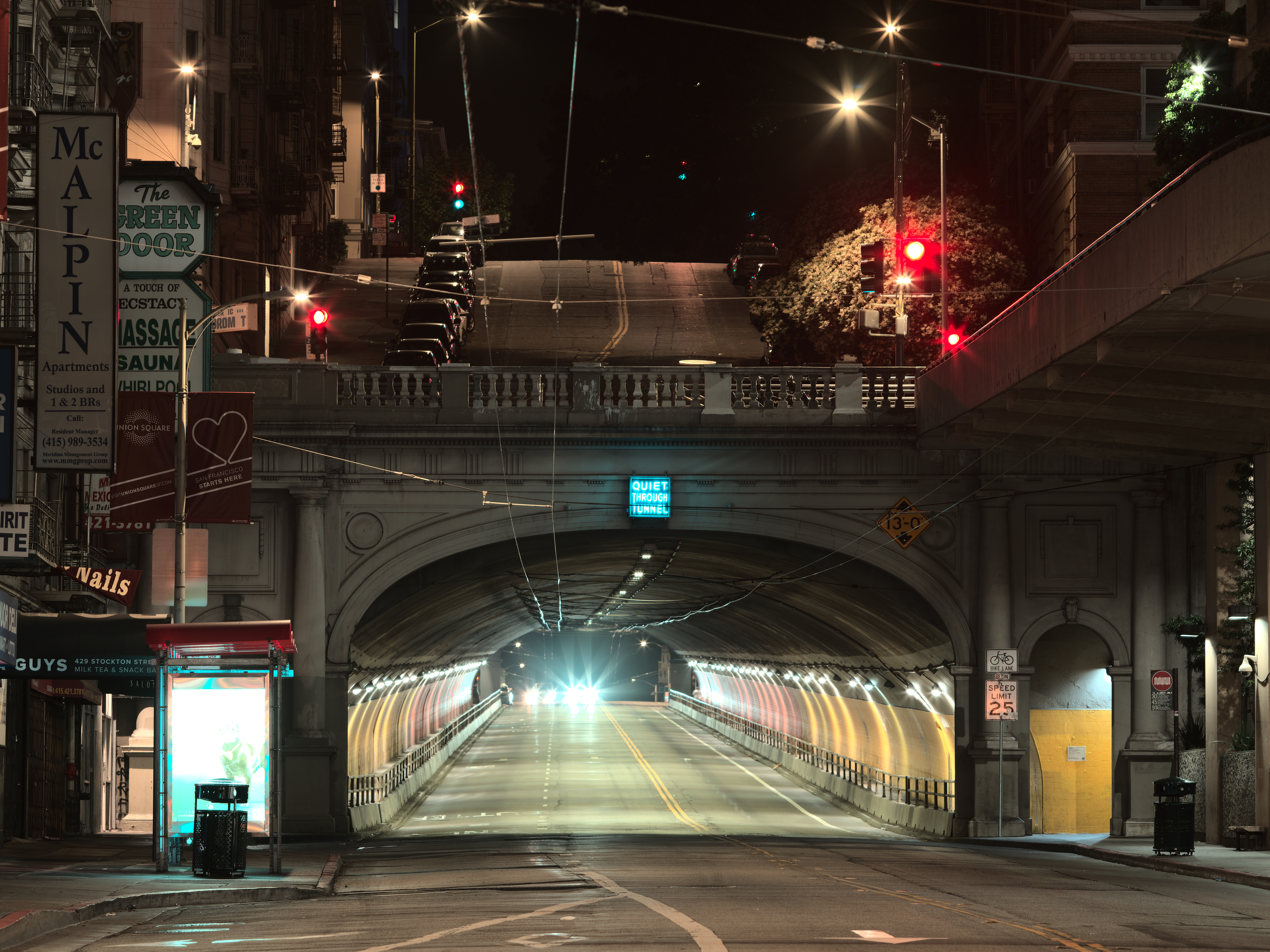
South portal (2020)

== In media ==
SFGATE has remarked on the tunnel's use by filmmakers, noting in particular the "crooked" topography at its southern end at Bush and Stockton streets: "Many dimensions are blurred on the cryptic intersection. [...] The Escher-like dimensions mark the edge of four different neighborhoods. Steep alleys appear from nowhere and plunge onto the sidewalk."

- The opening scene of The Maltese Falcon novel (1929) is set at the corner of Bush and Stockton, atop the southern portal of the tunnel.
- A promotional poster for the 1941 film adaptation of The Maltese Falcon features a man standing in the tunnel, in what SFGATE described as "one of the most evocative noir shots in film history."
- One scene in David Fincher's film The Game (1997) was shot at the same corner.
- In Ron Underwood's film Heart and Souls (1993), a bus crashes above the tunnel and drops to block the Stockton Street Tunnel's entrance.
- In the movie Shang-Chi and the Legend of the Ten Rings (2021), a fight scene occurs on a bus that travels through the tunnel.

== See also ==
- Central Subway – also tunneled below Stockton Street
- Broadway Tunnel (San Francisco)
