= Fillmore Street =

Street in San Francisco, California

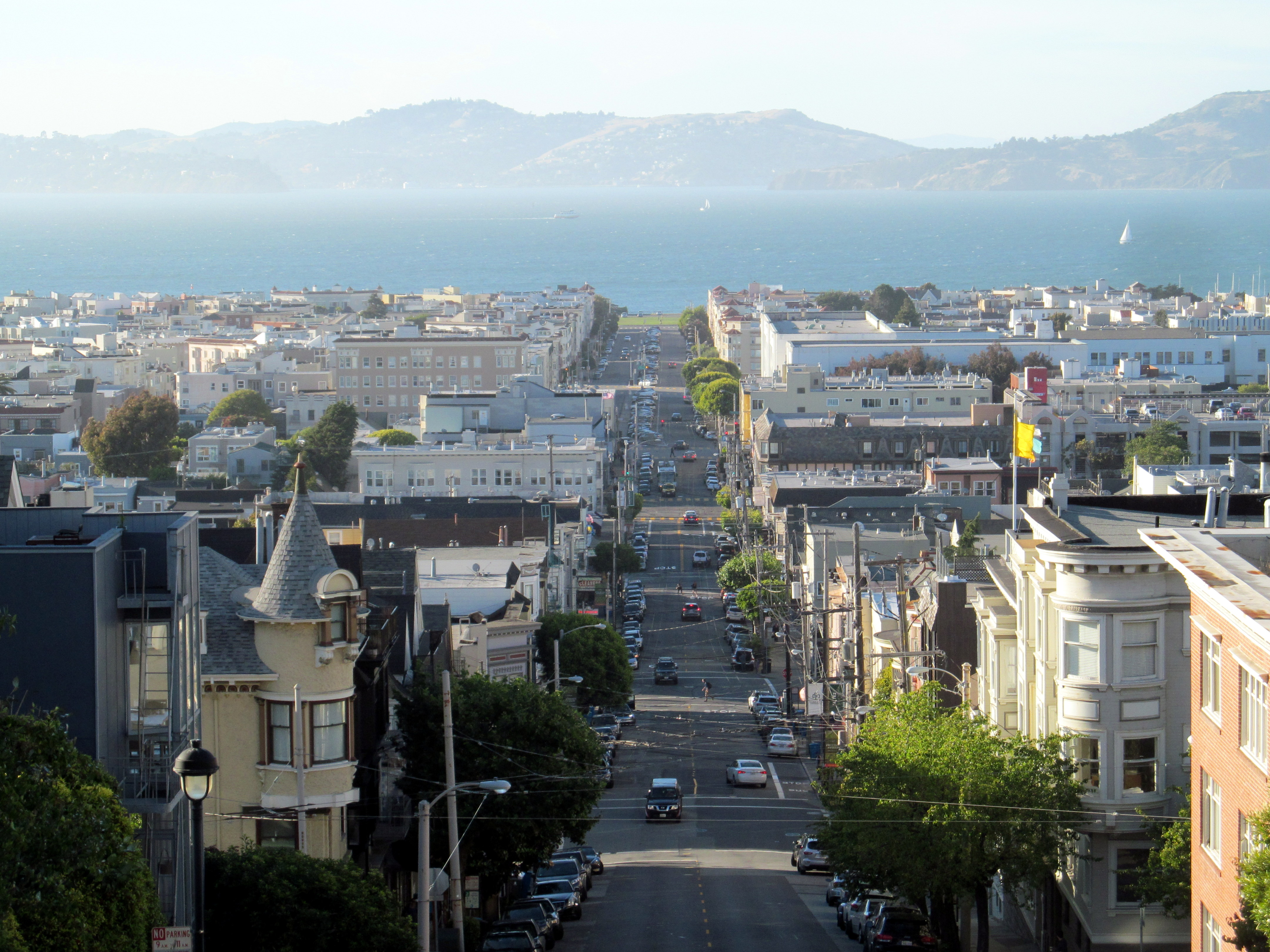
- Fillmore Street north from Pacific Heights
- Interactive map of Fillmore Street
- Namesake: US President Millard Fillmore
- Location: San Francisco, California
- South end: Duboce Street, on the north side of the Duboce Triangle
- Major junctions: Geary Boulevard; Lombard Street (U.S. Route 101)
- North end: Marina Boulevard, opposite the Marina Green, in the Marina District

Fillmore Street is a street in San Francisco, California, running from Duboce Street at its south end to Marina Boulevard, across from the Marina Green, at its northern Terminus. Through its course, it passes from the Duboce Triangle area, through the Lower Haight, Hayes Valley, the Lower Fillmore (also known as the Fillmore District, which takes its name from the street), Japantown, the Upper Fillmore (also known as "Lower Pacific Heights"), Pacific Heights, Cow Hollow, and, at its northern end, the Marina District. Addresses on Fillmore Street run from south to north.

== History ==
Fillmore Street, named after American President Millard Fillmore, was first designated when San Francisco's Western Addition was platted in the 1860s. In the 1880s, the area acquired the name "The Fillmore". Streetcar service on Fillmore started in July 1895; the following month the Fillmore Counterbalance was installed to traverse the steep 24.54% grade of Pacific Heights between Green and Broadway.

Following the 1906 San Francisco earthquake, Fillmore was left largely intact. The first streetcar to run after the fires ran on Fillmore and several of the city's theaters and department stores relocated to the road following the disaster. Between 1907 and 1943, several decorative arches lined the street's intersections. They were removed and used as scrap metal for the war effort.

== Shopping streets ==
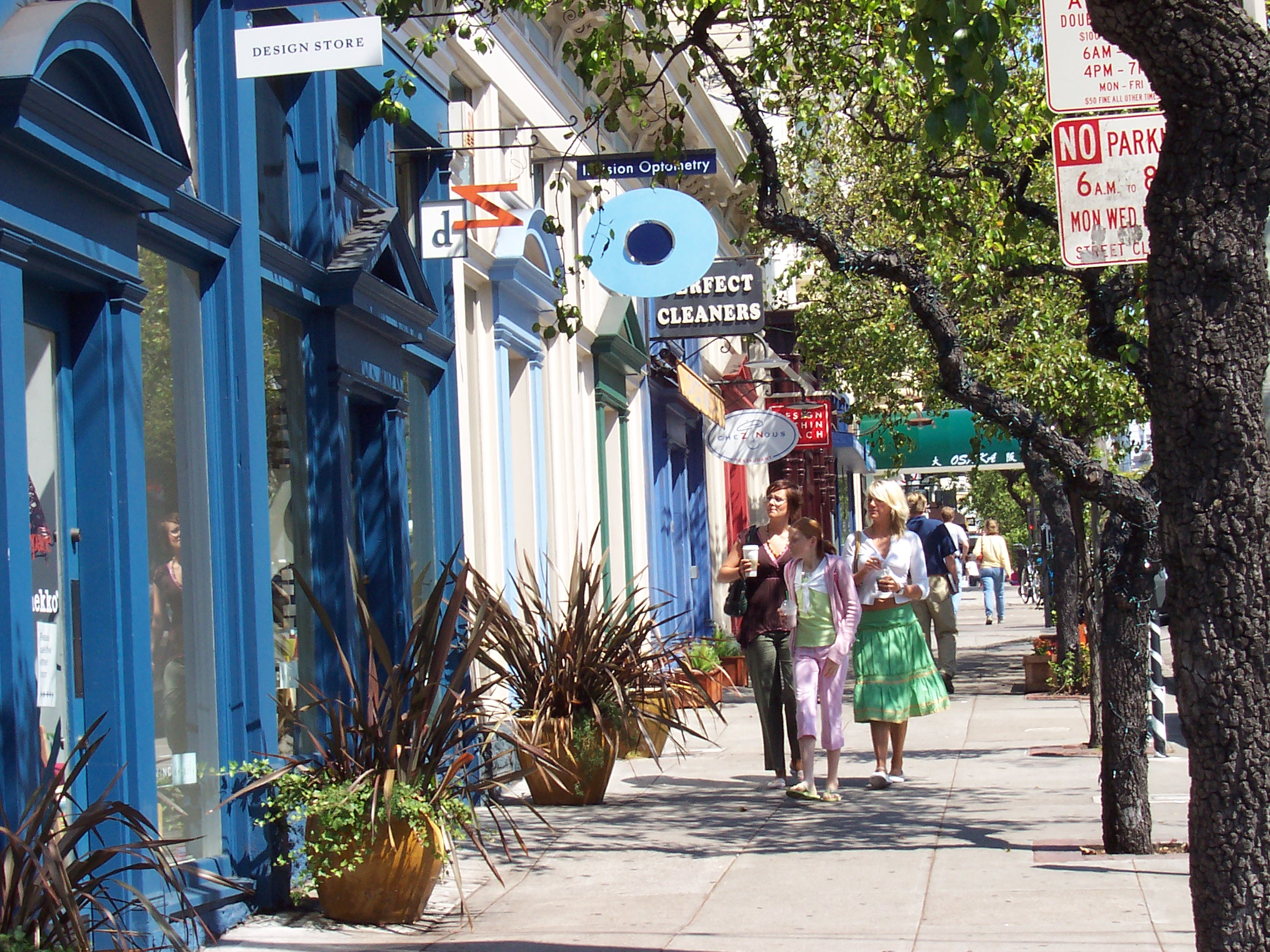
A sidewalk on Fillmore Street in Pacific Heights, near Bush Street

A large portion of Fillmore Street consists of shopping streets, often forming the central area of the neighborhoods that it passes through. This includes the stretch from Germania Street to Haight Street in the Lower Haight. The three blocks south and nine blocks north of Geary Boulevard are the centerpoints for the Lower and Upper Fillmore neighborhoods, respectively. The commercial stretch between Union and Chestnut Streets connects the main shopping areas of the Cow Hollow (or by some definitions, Golden Gate Valley) and Marina Districts. This area is nicknamed "The Triangle" and is a popular barhopping locale known for its yuppie patrons. The area gets its nickname from the bars found on three of the four corners of the intersection of Fillmore and Greenwich Streets.

== Transportation ==
The entire length of the street is served by San Francisco Muni's 22 Fillmore bus line.

== In popular culture ==
Cornelius Fillmore, the main character of the Disney Channel animated series Fillmore! is named after the Fillmore Street, in keeping with all characters from the series being given surnames taken from the names of San Francisco streets.

== See also ==
- Fillmore Street Tunnel
- Clay Theatre
- Six Gallery reading
