= Bion J. Arnold =

American engineer (1861–1942)

Bion Joseph Arnold
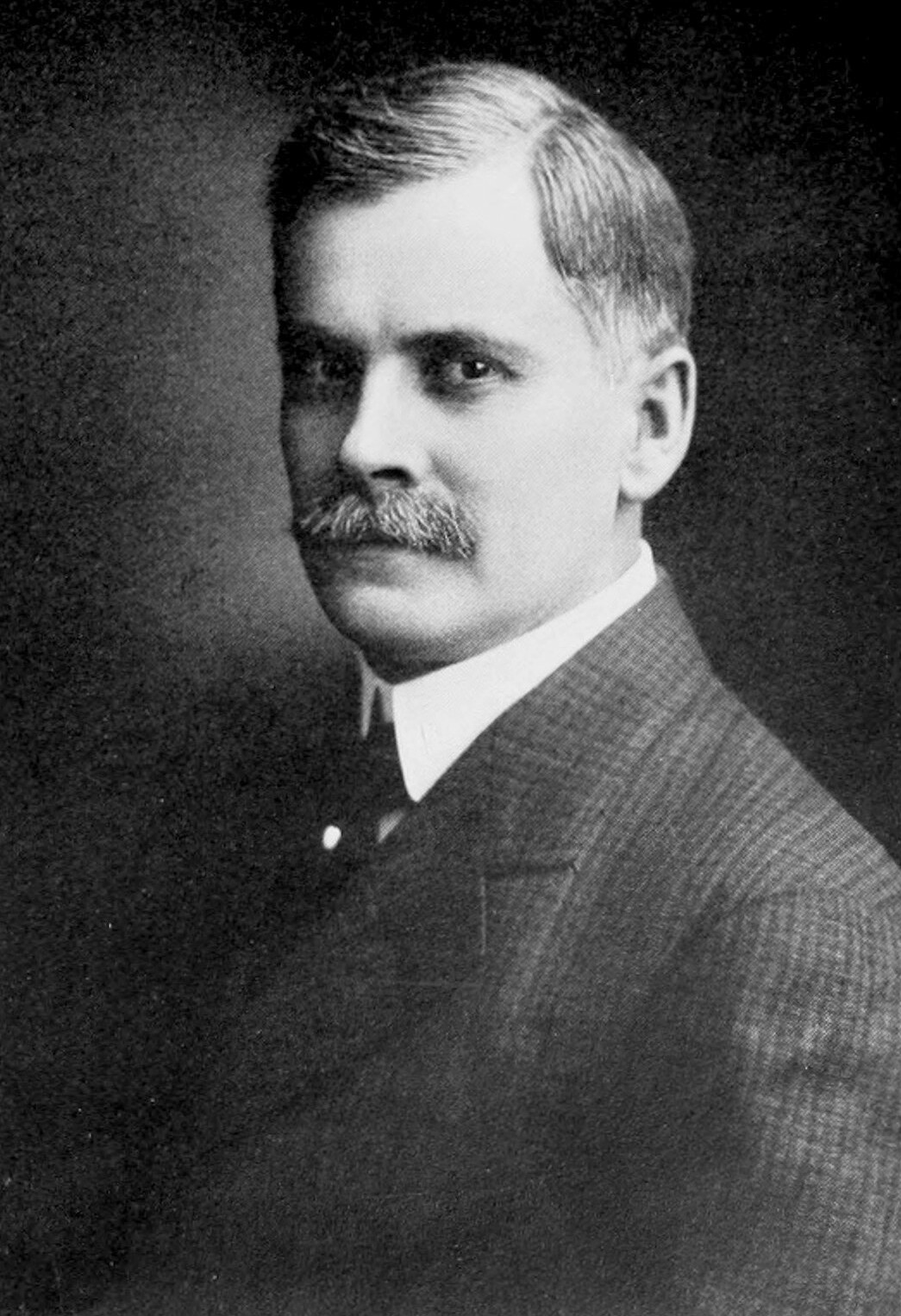
- Born: August 14, 1861; Casnovia, Michigan
- Died: January 29, 1942 (aged 80); Chicago, Illinois
- Military career
- Branch: United States Army
- Rank: lieutenant colonel

Bion Joseph Arnold (August 14, 1861 – January 29, 1942) was an American engineer. He is remembered as "father of the third rail", a pioneer in electrical engineering, and an urban mass transportation expert who helped design New York's Interborough Rapid Transit subway system. He also served as a lieutenant colonel during World War I in the Aviation Section of the Signal Corps.

== Early life ==
Arnold was born in Casnovia, Michigan on August 14, 1861.

== Civilian career ==
After graduating from Hillsdale College in Michigan and the University of Nebraska in 1897, Arnold set up his own company in Chicago at a time when railroads were converting their power sources from steam to electricity. In 1898, Arnold developed a new method of converting alternating current from power plants to direct current in substations for the Chicago & Milwaukee Electric Railway. This innovative electrification system would eventually become a standard in the interurban and street railway industries. Between 1898 and 1912, he assisted the New York Central Railroad and the Hudson River Railroad in conversion of their lines leading into Grand Central Terminal.

When the Interborough Rapid Transit's first line opened in 1904, the subway proved to be more popular than envisioned. By 1908, a system designed for a maximum of 600,000 passengers per day was being used by 800,000. Arnold was called upon again to solve the problem. His solution was to place automatic speed control devices on the trains themselves, so that more trains could be run during each hour.

Arnold also assisted in the conversion of electrified railways in Los Angeles and Pittsburgh, and the cable car systems in San Francisco. Arnold was president of the American Institute of Electrical Engineers from 1903 to 1904.

== Military career ==
On December 14, 1917, Arnold transferred to the regular Army as a lieutenant colonel in the Aviation Section of the Signal Corps. He was assigned to aircraft equipment production in Washington, DC. He was honorably discharged on Feb. 6, 1919. He was a colonel in the inactive reserve after 1929.

== Personal life ==
Arnold lived in Chicago, Illinois.

== Death and legacy ==
Arnold died at his home in Chicago on January 29, 1942, and is buried in Ashland Cemetery, in his hometown of Ashland, Nebraska.
