= List of trolleybus systems in the United States =

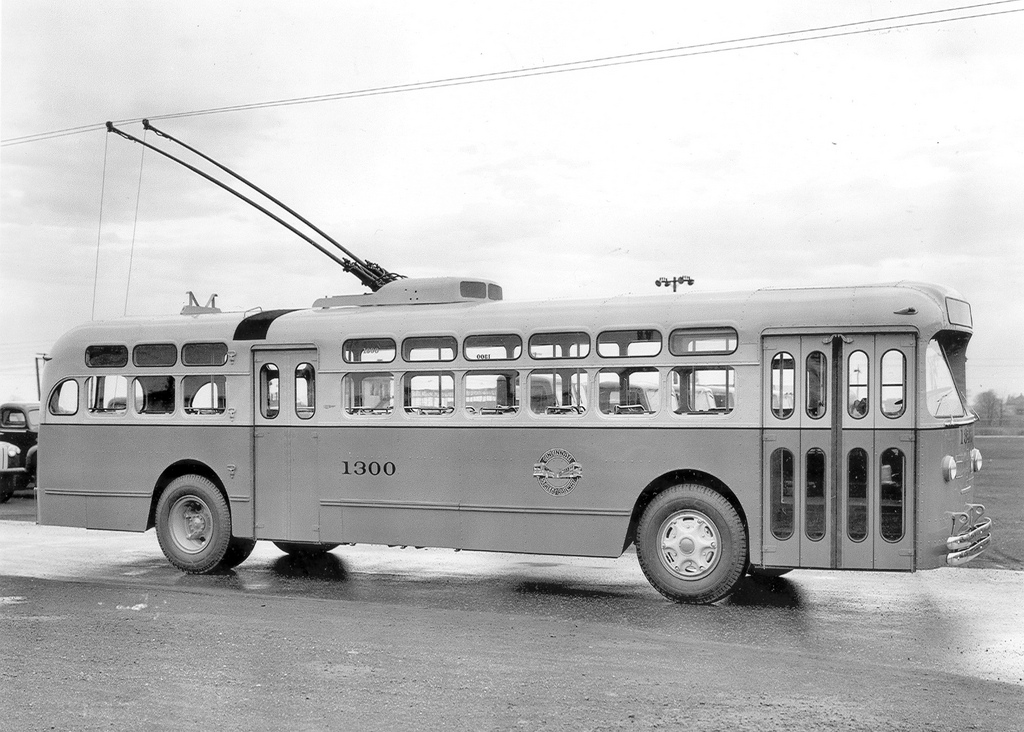
Cincinnati Street Railway Marmon-Herrington TC44 trolleybus #1300, photographed as new in 1947

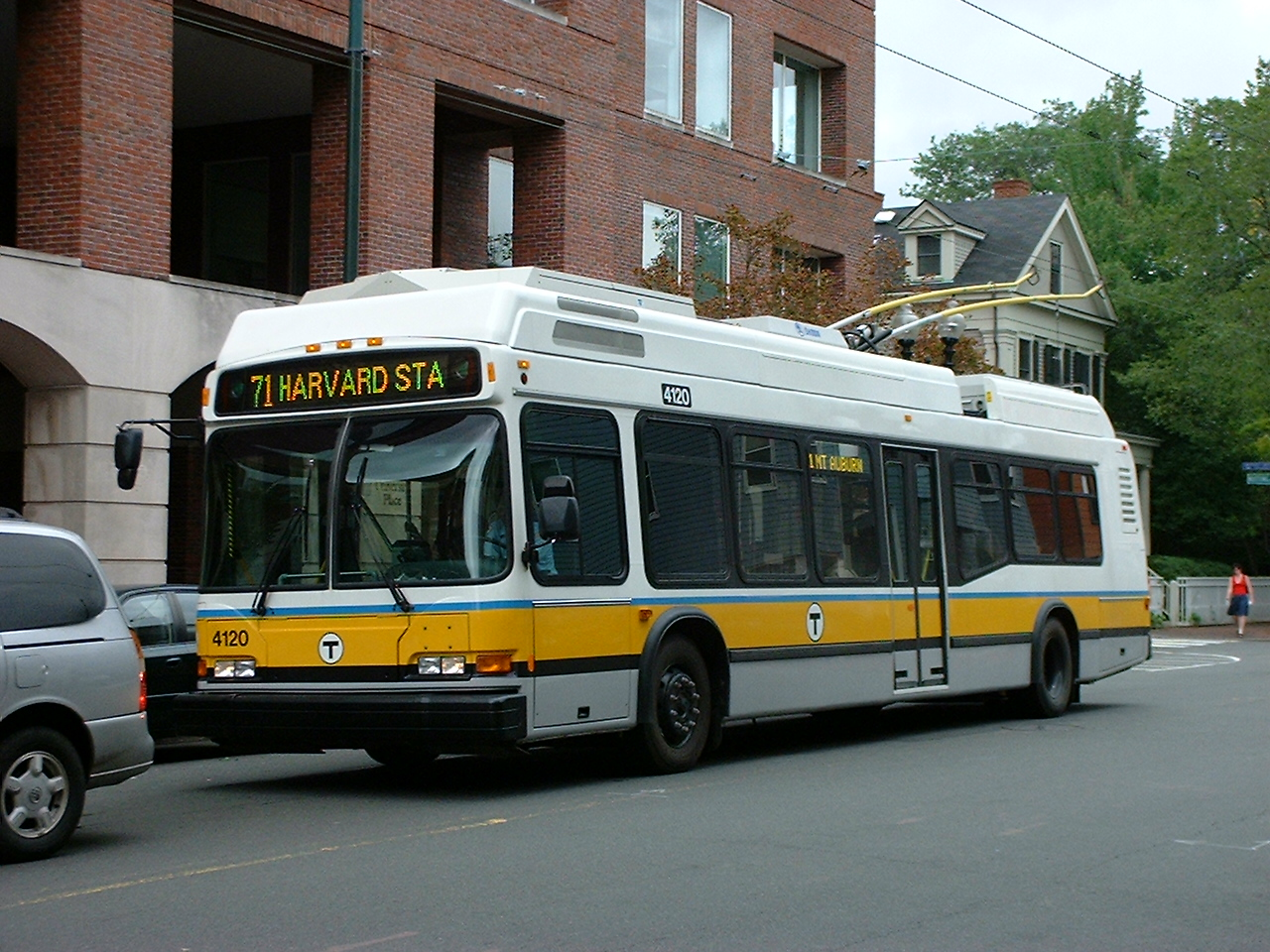
Trolleybus in Cambridge, Massachusetts, on the Boston trolleybus system

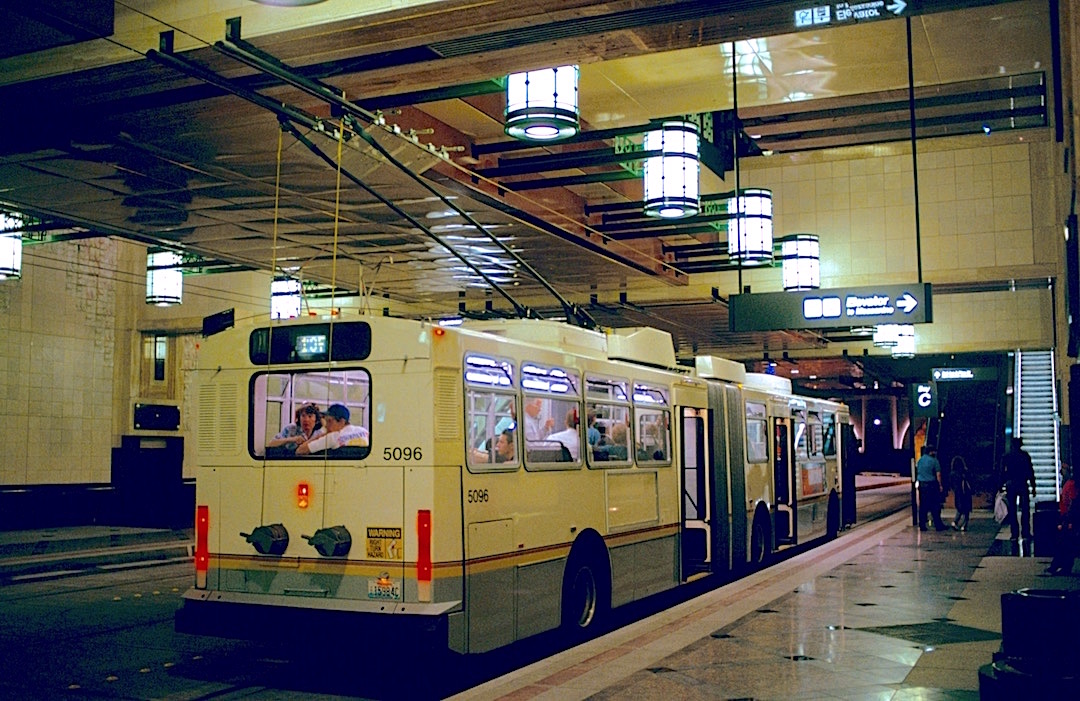
A dual-mode bus operating as a trolleybus in the Downtown Seattle Transit Tunnel, in 1990

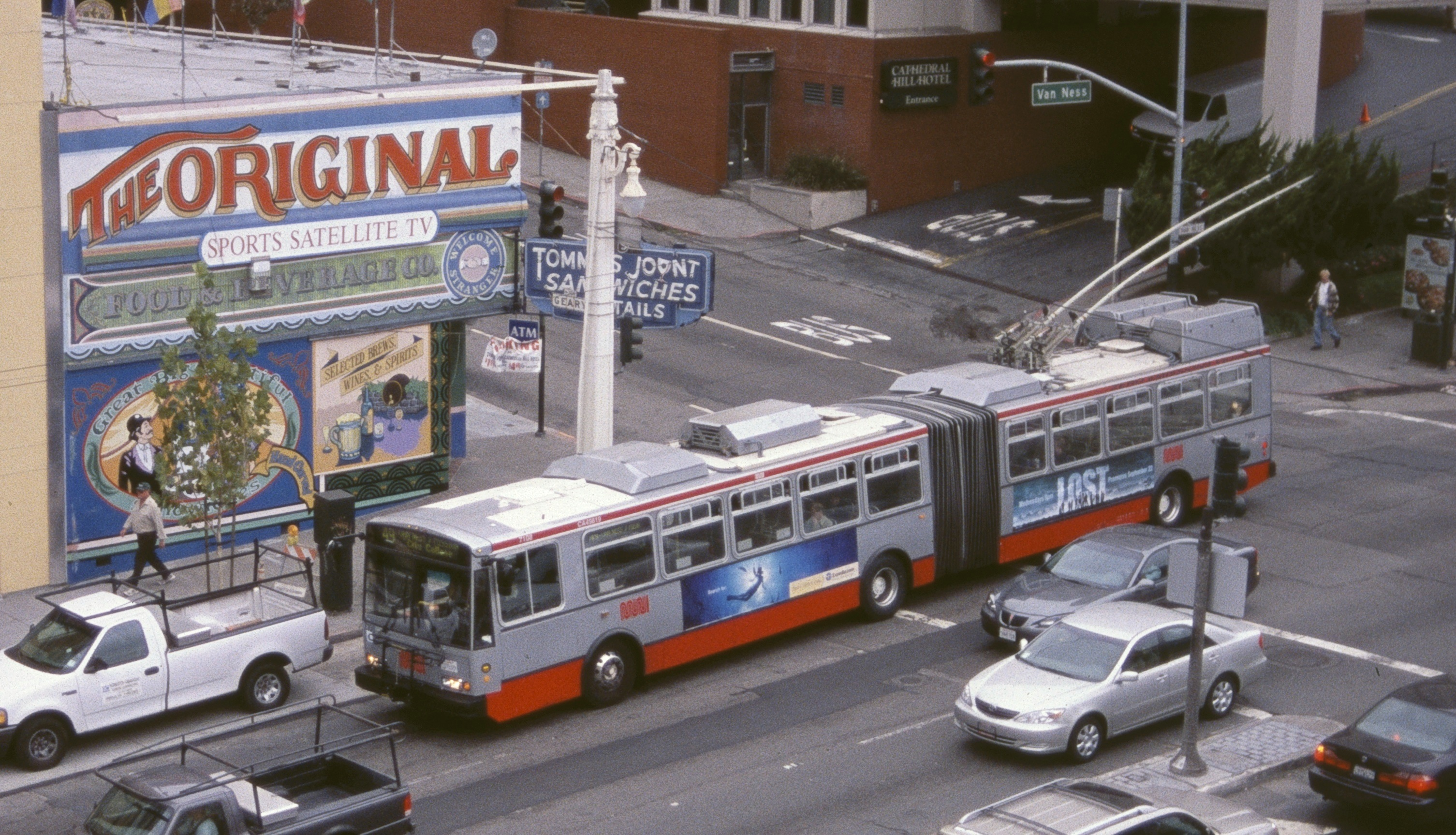
San Francisco Muni ETI 15TrSF trolleybus #7108, on Van Ness Avenue at Geary Street, in 2004

This is a list of trolleybus systems in the United States by state. It includes all trolleybus systems, past and present. About 65 trolleybus systems have existed in the U.S. at one time or another. In this list, boldface type in the "location" column and blue background colored row indicates one of the four U.S. trolleybus systems still in operation.

== Alabama ==
Name of system	Location	Date (from)	Date (to)	Notes
Birmingham Electric Company Birmingham Transit	Birmingham	30 April 1947	22 November 1958	

== Arkansas ==
Name of system	Location	Date (from)	Date (to)	Notes
Capitol Transportation Co.	Little Rock	26 December 1947	1 March 1956	

== California ==
Name of system	Location	Date (from)	Date (to)	Notes
	Los Angeles	11 September 1910	1915	Located in Laurel Canyon. The first commercial trolleybus system in the United States. Later, there were 1922 and 1937 demonstrations of newer vehicles. (Note: First system connected Sunset Boulevard with a new housing development, "Bungalow Town," in Laurel Canyon. Built and operated by Laurel Canyon Utilities Company.)
Los Angeles Transit Lines (1947–58); Los Angeles Metropolitan Transit Authority (1958–63)	Los Angeles	3 August 1947	30 March 1963	Lines 2 and 3 Construction of a new system was planned in the early 1990s, but the plans were cancelled in December 1993 because of a severe budget crisis.
	(Oakland)			Construction started 1945, not completed. Vehicles built for Oakland were used in Los Angeles.
	**San Francisco**	6 October 1935		The first trolleybus line was opened by the former Market Street Railway Company (MSR). The San Francisco Municipal Railway ("Muni") opened the second trolleybus line on 7 September 1941. MSR was absorbed by Muni on 29 September 1944. Most of the current trolleybus system was built to replace MSR tramway lines. See also Trolleybuses in San Francisco
	(Wrightwood)			Line planned ca. 1911 by Lone Pine Utilities Company, an affiliate of Laurel Canyon Utilities Company. Planned to connect Grava railway station (or halt) to Wrightwood. A contemporary account in a local newspaper states that construction was started but not completed.

== Colorado ==
Name of system	Location	Date (from)	Date (to)	Notes
Denver Tramway Co.	Denver	2 June 1940	10 June 1955	

== Connecticut ==
Name of system	Location	Date (from)	Date (to)	Notes
	Greenwich	July 1897	c. January 1898	Demonstration (H. Van Hœvenbergh). First passenger-carrying trolleybus on a public road. Operated for two hours a day, for six months.
	New Haven	1903		Demonstration (A. Upham).

== Delaware ==
Name of system	Location	Date (from)	Date (to)	Notes
	Wilmington	24 September 1939	6 December 1957	

== Georgia ==
Name of system	Location	Date (from)	Date (to)	Notes
Georgia Railway and Power Company (1937-1950), then Atlanta Transit Company (1950-1963)	Atlanta	28 June 1937	27 September 1963	See also: Trolleybuses in Atlanta Mass conversion of 20 streetcar lines to trackless trolleys in 1949. In 1950, had 453 coaches and was the largest system in the United States.

== Hawaii ==
Name of system	Location	Date (from)	Date (to)	Notes
Honolulu Rapid Transit Company Limited	Honolulu	1936	-	Demonstration
Honolulu Rapid Transit Company Limited	Honolulu	1 January 1938	22 June 1957	

== Illinois ==
Name of system	Location	Date (from)	Date (to)	Notes
Chicago Transit Authority	Chicago	17 April 1930	25 March 1973	See also: Trolleybuses in Chicago
	Peoria	13 November 1931	3 October 1946	
	Rockford	10 December 1930	6 June 1947	

== Indiana ==
Name of system	Location	Date (from)	Date (to)	Notes
	Fort Wayne	7 July 1940	12 June 1960	
	Indianapolis	4 December 1932	10 May 1957	

== Iowa ==
Name of system	Location	Date (from)	Date (to)	Notes
Des Moines Railway Co./Des Moines Transit Co.	Des Moines	9 October 1938	24 January 1964	Trolleybuses here were known as "Curbliners". One Des Moines trolleybus is preserved at the Illinois Railway Museum.

== Kansas ==
Name of system	Location	Date (from)	Date (to)	Notes
	Topeka	27 March 1932	30 June 1940	

== Kentucky ==
Name of system	Location	Date (from)	Date (to)	Notes
	Covington	11 September 1937	12 March 1958	System extended across the Ohio River to Cincinnati.
	Louisville	27 December 1936	7 May 1951	

== Louisiana ==
Name of system	Location	Date (from)	Date (to)	Notes
	New Orleans	2 December 1929	26 March 1967	
	Shreveport	15 December 1931	26 May 1965	

== Maryland ==
Name of system	Location	Date (from)	Date (to)	Notes
	Baltimore:			
	♦ Baltimore - Randallstown	1 November 1922	31 August 1931	
	♦ Urban system	6 March 1938	21 June 1959	

== Massachusetts ==
Name of system	Location	Date (from)	Date (to)	Notes
Boston Elevated Railway (1936–1947); Metropolitan Transit Authority (1947–1964); Massachusetts Bay Transportation Authority (1964–2023)	Greater Boston (Note: The historic trolleybus ("trackless trolley") system of the Boston metropolitan area had six groups of lines.)	11 April 1936	30 June 2023	
Boston Elevated Railway (1936–1947); Metropolitan Transit Authority (1947–1964); Massachusetts Bay Transportation Authority (1964–2023)	♦ Cambridge - Watertown - Belmont	11 April 1936	12 March 2022	
Boston Elevated Railway (1936–1947); Metropolitan Transit Authority (1947–1964); Massachusetts Bay Transportation Authority (1964–2023)	♦ Boston: Somerville - Medford - Arlington	8 November 1941	31 March 1963	
Boston Elevated Railway (1936–1947); Metropolitan Transit Authority (1947–1964); Massachusetts Bay Transportation Authority (1964–2023)	♦ Boston: Everett - Malden	28 November 1936	31 March 1963	
Boston Elevated Railway (1936–1947); Metropolitan Transit Authority (1947–1964); Massachusetts Bay Transportation Authority (1964–2023)	♦ Boston: East Boston - Chelsea - Revere	5 January 1952	9 September 1961	
Boston Elevated Railway (1936–1947); Metropolitan Transit Authority (1947–1964); Massachusetts Bay Transportation Authority (1964–2023)	♦ Boston: Dorchester	25 December 1948	6 April 1962	Not connected with remainder of the system.
Boston Elevated Railway (1936–1947); Metropolitan Transit Authority (1947–1964); Massachusetts Bay Transportation Authority (1964–2023)	♦ Boston: Arborway	29 September 1951	1 October 1958	Not connected with remainder of the system.
Boston Elevated Railway (1936–1947); Metropolitan Transit Authority (1947–1964); Massachusetts Bay Transportation Authority (1964–2023)	♦ Boston: South Boston Waterfront (MBTA's Silver Line – Waterfront)	17 December 2004	30 June 2023	Dual-mode (diesel-trolley) buses used electric traction in the South Boston Waterfront tunnel and a short surface section, and diesel propulsion elsewhere. Replaced by diesel-electric hybrid buses with extended battery range for the tunnel. See also Trolleybuses in Greater Boston
	Fairhaven	16 October 1915	1 December 1915	Experimental.
	Fitchburg	10 May 1932	30 June 1946	System also served Leominster.

== Michigan ==
Name of system	Location	Date (from)	Date (to)	Notes
	Detroit	19 June 1930	11 August 1937	Also 1921 and 1924 demonstrations.
	Detroit	15 December 1949	16 November 1962	Also 1921 and 1924 demonstrations.
	Flint	1936		Demonstration.
	Flint	6 December 1936	26 March 1956.	

== Minnesota ==
Name of system	Location	Date (from)	Date (to)	Notes
	Duluth	15 October 1931	15 May 1957	
Twin City Rapid Transit Company	Minneapolis	5 May 1922	22 May 1923	Experimental. One-wire trolley pole overhead, and a shoe to streetcar rails below to complete the circuit.

== Missouri ==
Name of system	Location	Date (from)	Date (to)	Notes
	Kansas City	29 May 1938	4 January 1959	Interstate line to Kansas City, Kansas opened 4 October 1950; closed 14 July 1951 because of flood damage.
	Saint Joseph	1 August 1932	22 November 1966	

== Nevada ==
Name of system	Location	Date (from)	Date (to)	Notes
	Reno	1897		Demonstration. (W. Caffery).

== New Jersey ==
Name of system	Location	Date (from)	Date (to)	Notes
	Camden	1 September 1935	1 June 1947	"All-Service Vehicle" (ASV) system. (Note: The "All-Service Vehicle" systems used gasoline-electric motorbuses modified for operation from external power or onboard engine-generator set. The route systems were not fully electrified, and operating depots had no overhead wires. (A modern-day equivalent of this is the dual-mode bus.))
	Newark	15 September 1935 (Note: The operator conducted a demonstration at Weehawken in 1934 prior to opening of public service with ASVs in 1935. Weehawken was served by the Newark system.)	10 November 1948	"All-Service Vehicle" (ASV) system. (Note: The Newark ASV system also served many adjacent towns, including the Hudson County towns of Bayonne, Jersey City, Hoboken, Union City and West New York, the Passaic County towns of Passaic and Paterson, and the Union County towns of Elizabeth and Plainfield.)

== New York ==
Name of system	Location	Date (from)	Date (to)	Notes
	Buffalo	30 December 1949	January 1950	Demonstration.
	Cohoes	2 November 1924	12 December 1937 (or 9 October 1933)	
	New York	1923		Demonstration.
	Brooklyn	23 July 1930	26 July 1960	
	Staten Island	8 October 1921	16 October 1927	
	Rochester	1 November 1923	22 March 1932	

== North Carolina ==
Name of system	Location	Date (from)	Date (to)	Notes
	Greensboro	15 July 1934	5 June 1956	

== Ohio ==
Name of system	Location	Date (from)	Date (to)	Notes
	Akron	12 December 1941	6 June 1959	
	Cincinnati	1 December 1936	18 June 1965	
Cleveland Transit System	Cleveland	1 March 1936	14 June 1963	
	Columbus	3 December 1933	3 May 1965	
Dayton Street Railway Company (Dayton Street Transit Company)	**Dayton** (Note: Dayton was a notable exception to the "typical" U.S. trend of consolidation ("unification") of public transport services. Five companies operated tramway service from 1909 to 1933. All five companies operated trolleybuses for several months in 1940–41, prior to the beginning of consolidations. The largest company, the City Railway Company (CRC), became the City Transit Company (CTC) in 1955 and was taken into public ownership by the Miami Valley Regional Transit Authority in 1972. MVRTA is known today as the Greater Dayton Regional Transit Authority.)	23 April 1933	(28 April 1941) (Note: Date of sale)	Sold to CRC.
Oakwood Street Railway Company (Oakwood and Dayton Transit Company)	**Dayton**	19 January 1936	(1 October 1956)	Sold to CTC.
Peoples Railway Company (Peoples Transit Company)	**Dayton**	11 October 1936	(9 March 1945)	Sold to CRC.
The City Railway Company (later The City Transit Company)	**Dayton**	25 March 1938		See also Trolleybuses in Dayton
Dayton-Xenia Railway Company	**Dayton**	1 October 1940	(31 October 1955)	Sold to CTC.
	Toledo	1 February 1935	28 May 1952	
	Youngstown	11 November 1936	10 June 1959	

== Oregon ==
Name of system	Location	Date (from)	Date (to)	Notes
Portland Traction Co.; Rose City Transit Co.	Portland	30 August 1936	23 October 1958	Also demonstration, May 1935 - October 1935.

== Pennsylvania ==
Name of system	Location	Date (from)	Date (to)	Notes
Johnstown Traction Company	Johnstown	20 November 1951	11 November 1967	
	**Philadelphia**	14 October 1923		Also demonstration in 1921. Service suspended 1 July 2003 – 14 April 2008. See also Trolleybuses in Philadelphia
	Pittsburgh	28 September 1936	11 October 1936	Demonstration.
	Pittsburgh	1949		Demonstration.
	Scranton	1903		Demonstration. (A. Upham).
	Wilkes-Barre	15 December 1939	16 October 1958	

== Rhode Island ==
Name of system	Location	Date (from)	Date (to)	Notes
	Pawtucket	26 December 1931	30 May 1953	
	Providence	22 June 1935	24 June 1955	
	Providence – Pawtucket	9 November 1940	6 July 1953	

== South Carolina ==
Name of system	Location	Date (from)	Date (to)	Notes
	Greenville	19 August 1934	20 February 1956	

== Tennessee ==
Name of system	Location	Date (from)	Date (to)	Notes
	Knoxville	28 April 1930	1 July 1945	
Memphis Street Railway Company	Memphis	8 November 1931	22 April 1960	

== Texas ==
Name of system	Location	Date (from)	Date (to)	Notes
	Dallas	25 November 1945	28 July 1966	

== Utah ==
Name of system	Location	Date (from)	Date (to)	Notes
	Salt Lake City	9 September 1928	September 1946	

== Virginia ==
Name of system	Location	Date (from)	Date (to)	Notes
	Norfolk	1921		Demonstration.
	Norfolk	1924		Demonstration.
	Petersburg	19 June 1923	31 December 1926	
	Portsmouth	1923		Demonstration.
	Richmond	1921		Demonstration.

== Washington ==
Name of system	Location	Date (from)	Date (to)	Notes
Seattle Transit System (until 1973); Metro (1973 to present)	**Seattle**	28 April 1940		Also 27 February 1937 – 9 March 1937 demonstration. All service suspended 21 January 1978 – 14 September 1979 for renewal. (Note: All overhead wires, other infrastructure and vehicles (but not most support poles for the wires) were replaced during the 1978–79 suspension, but the transition is not considered the end of one system and the beginning of a "second" system, because the suspension was only temporary, for upgrading. The current system is widely considered as having opened in 1940.) See also Trolleybuses in Seattle

Dual-mode (diesel-trolley) buses operated 15 September 1990 – 24 January 2005 on routes using the Downtown Seattle Transit Tunnel. The overhead wire system in the tunnel was not connected to that used by surface trolleybus services.

== Wisconsin ==
Name of system	Location	Date (from)	Date (to)	Notes
	Kenosha	15 February 1932	1 March 1952	
Merrill Railway & Lighting Co.	Merrill	January 1913	December 1913	Experimental.
	Milwaukee	8 November 1936	20 June 1965	

== See also ==
- List of trolleybus systems, for all other countries
- Trolleybus
- Trolleybus usage by country
- List of streetcar systems in the United States
- List of tram and light rail transit systems
- List of metro systems

== Sources ==
=== Books and periodicals ===
- Bruce, Ashley R. (2017). Lombard-Gerin and Inventing the Trolleybus. UK: Trolleybooks. ISBN 978-0-904235-25-8.
- Clarke, Bradley H. (1970). The Trackless Trolleys of Boston. Cambridge (MA), US: Boston Street Railway Association.
- Murray, Alan (2000). World Trolleybus Encyclopaedia. Reading, Berkshire, UK: Trolleybooks. ISBN 0-904235-18-1.
- Porter, Harry; Worris, Stanley F. X. (1979). Trolleybus Bulletin No. 109: Databook II. North American Trackless Trolley Association. OCLC 6114089.
- Sebree, Mac; Ward, Paul (1974). The Trolley Coach in North America. Interurbans Special 59. Los Angeles, US: Interurbans. LCCN 74-20367.
- Trolleybus Magazine (ISSN 0266-7452). National Trolleybus Association (UK). Bimonthly.
