= Electric Transit =

Electric Transit may refer to:

- Electric Transit, Inc. (ETI), a former manufacturer of trolley buses, from 1994 to 2004
- Electric Transit (software company), a short-lived software publishing company in the mid-1980s
- Electric transit, public transit that employs electricity for propulsion, such as trams, trolleybuses and other kinds of electric buses

== See also ==
- Servicio de Transportes Eléctricos (Electric Transit Service – public agency in Mexico City)
