= Trolleybuses in Dayton =

Electric transit system serving Dayton, Ohio

Dayton trolleybus system
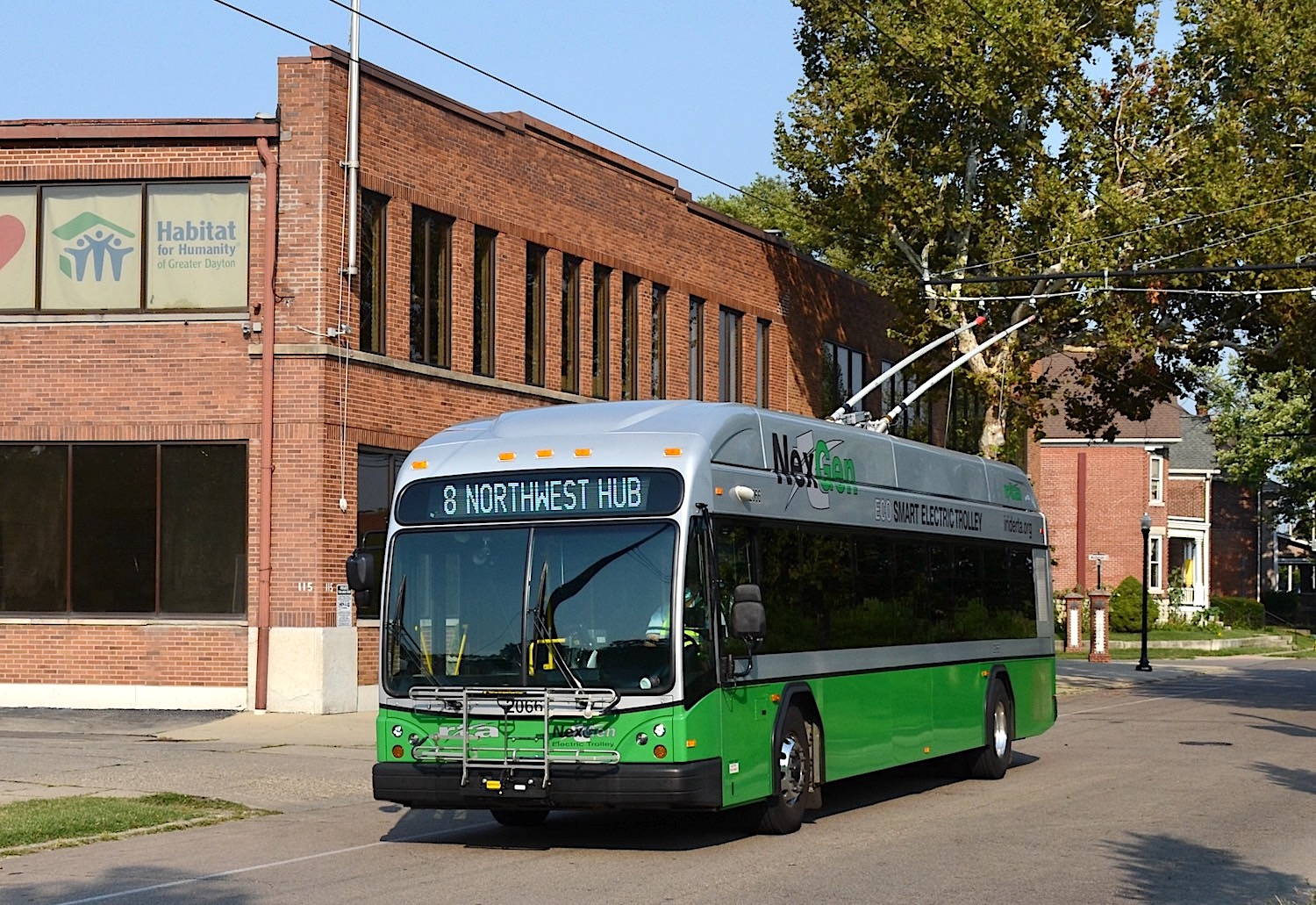
- A Gillig/Kiepe trolleybus on Riverview Avenue, 2021

Operation
- Locale: Dayton, Ohio, U.S.
- Open: April 23, 1933; 93 years ago
- Operators: 1933–72: Various private companies (see table in article); 1972–present: Greater Dayton Regional Transit Authority

Infrastructure
- Electrification: Parallel overhead lines, 600 V DC
- Stock: 45 Gillig Low Floor

Statistics
- Annual ridership: 1,594,100 (2025)
- Website: http://www.i-riderta.org i-riderta.org

The Dayton trolleybus system forms part of the public transportation network serving Dayton, Ohio, United States. Opened on April 23, 1933, it presently comprises five lines, and is operated by the Greater Dayton Regional Transit Authority, with a fleet of 45 trolleybuses. In 2025, the system had a ridership of 1,594,100, or about 5,100 per weekday as of the first quarter of 2026.

One of only five such systems still operating in the U.S. in the 2000s (and one of only four after the summer 2023 closure of the Boston system) and the only one in a city without a subway, light rail, or streetcar system, the Dayton trolleybus system is the current manifestation of an electric transit service that has been operated continuously in Dayton since 1888—longer than in any other city in the United States. By the 1970s, Dayton was already the smallest U.S. city still operating a trolleybus system. For both of these reasons, the city's trolleybuses are locally considered an icon of Dayton.

== History ==
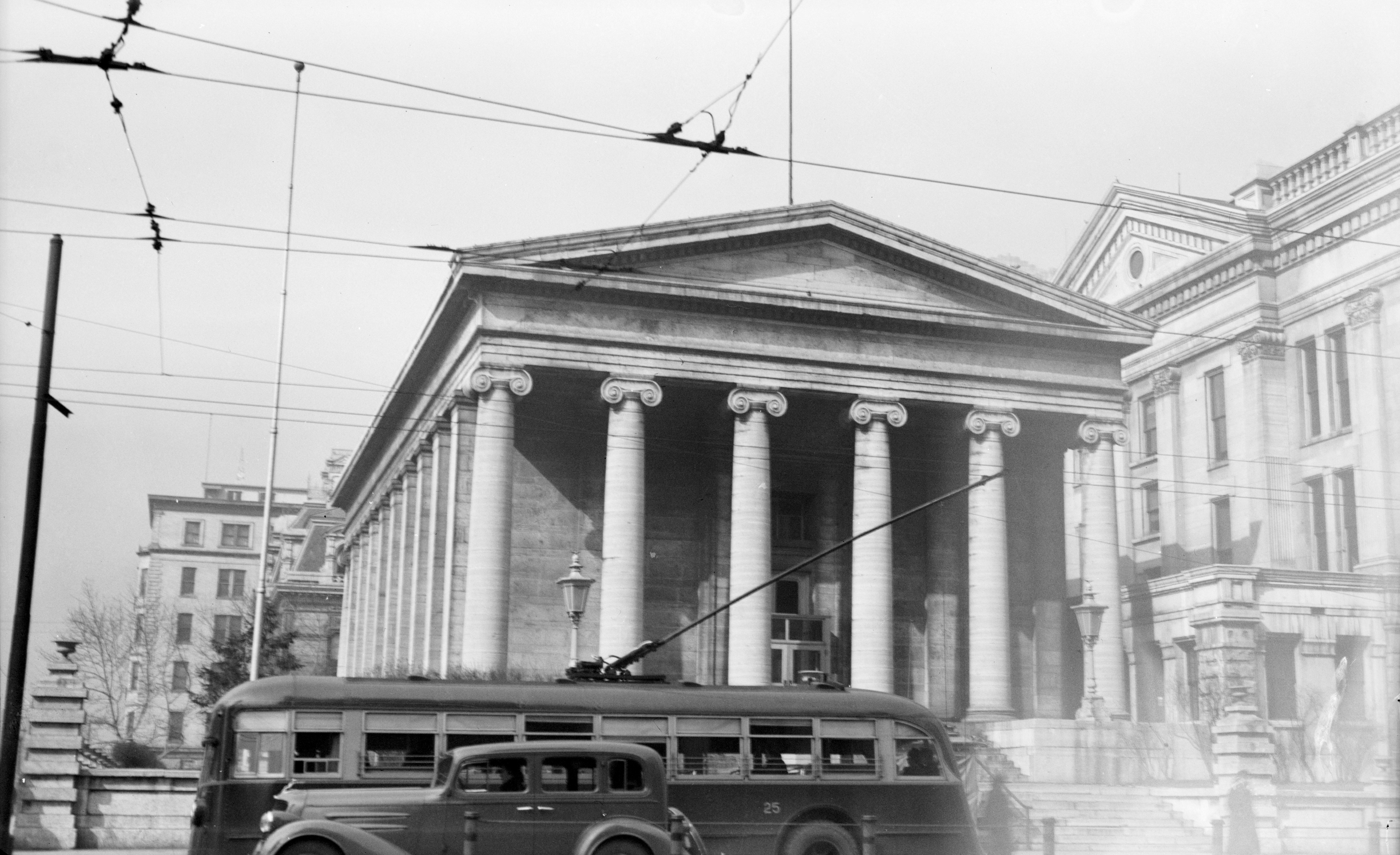
A trolleybus of the Oakwood Street Railway, one of multiple companies that once operated trolleybuses in Dayton, passing the Montgomery County Courthouse in 1937

The first electric trolleybus service in Ohio began operation in Dayton on April 23, 1933, when the Salem Avenue-Lorain Avenue line was converted from streetcars to trolley coaches. Electric streetcar service in Dayton had started in 1888, and it continued through to and beyond the start of trolleybus service. The last streetcar line in Dayton, City Railway's route 1-Third Street, was converted to trolleybuses on September 28, 1947. Dayton's trolleybus system is the second-oldest in the Western Hemisphere (which in 2011 totals 18 systems), exceeded in longevity only by the Philadelphia trolleybus system, which opened on October 14, 1923.

The first trolleybus line in Dayton was opened by the Dayton Street Railway company. The impetus for the decision to adopt trolleybuses was a 1932 fire at the company's carbarn, which gutted the building and destroyed sixteen streetcars and two gasoline-powered buses. After studying trolley coach systems then operating in other small cities, DSR placed an order with the J. G. Brill Company for twelve trolleybuses, and these inaugurated service on the city's first ETB line in April 1933. However, the Dayton Street Railway was only the first of several companies to operate trolleybus service in Dayton, some of which operated concurrently and shared overhead wires on some sections, mainly in downtown.

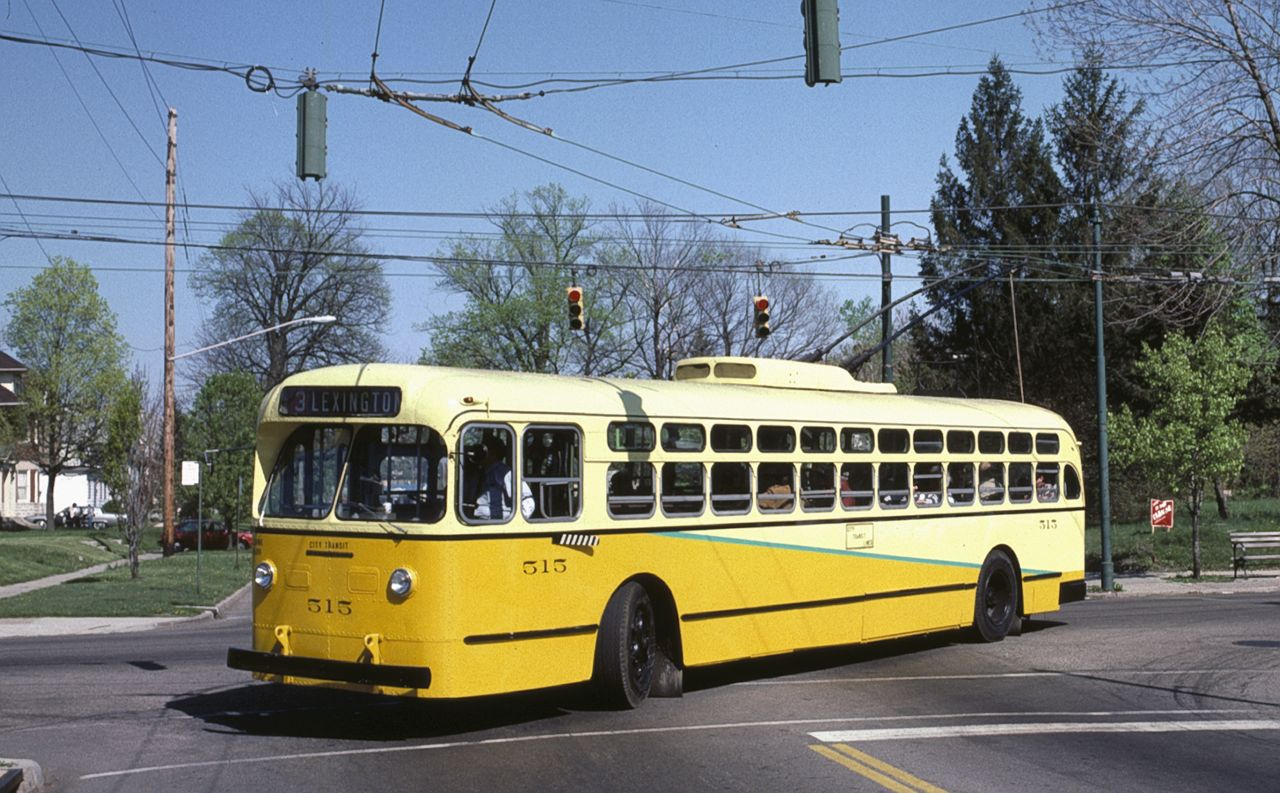
A Dayton Marmon-Herrington TC48 trolleybus from 1949, photographed as a historic vehicle in 1987

In the late 19th century, it was common in the United States for cities to be served by multiple different streetcar companies, each company typically operating a few lines. However, via mergers, acquisitions and sometimes bankruptcy the number of operating companies gradually declined to just one or two in each city. By 1930, most U.S. cities had just one company providing all urban transit service. Dayton was unusual in having multiple transit companies in operation through to World War II. In 1933, when the first trolleybus service began operating, Dayton still had five separate streetcar companies providing urban service, and all five eventually converted some or all of their routes to trolleybuses over the period 1933–40. As late as the 1960s, transit service in Dayton was provided "almost exclusively by trolley coaches".

The table below lists all of Dayton's trolleybus operators since the introduction of the mode in 1933.

Dayton trolleybus operating companies/authorities
Name	From	To	Notes
Dayton Street Railway Company	April 23, 1933	April 28, 1941	Renamed Dayton Street Transit Co. circa 1935. Acquired by City Railway Company in 1941.
Oakwood Street Railway Co. (OSR)	January 19, 1936	October 1, 1956	Acquired by City Transit Company.
Peoples Railway Co. (PR)	October 11, 1936	March 9, 1945	Acquired by City Railway Company.
City Railway Co. (CR)	March 25, 1938	October 31, 1955	Merged with Dayton-Xenia Railway Co. to form City Transit Company.
Dayton-Xenia Railway Co. (DXR)	October 1, 1940	October 31, 1955	The last newly built system to open. Merged with City Railway Co. to form City Transit Company.
City Transit Company (CT)	November 1, 1955	November 4, 1972	Formed by merger of CR with DXR, not new construction. Taken over in 1972 by new public authority, the Miami Valley Regional Transit Authority.
Miami Valley Regional Transit Authority (now Greater Dayton RTA)	November 5, 1972	present	Current operator of the system, renamed from MVRTA to GDRTA in 2002.

For a period of about seven months starting in October 1940, Dayton had five independently owned and operated trolleybus systems, making it the only city in the world ever to possess that many independent trolleybus systems concurrently.

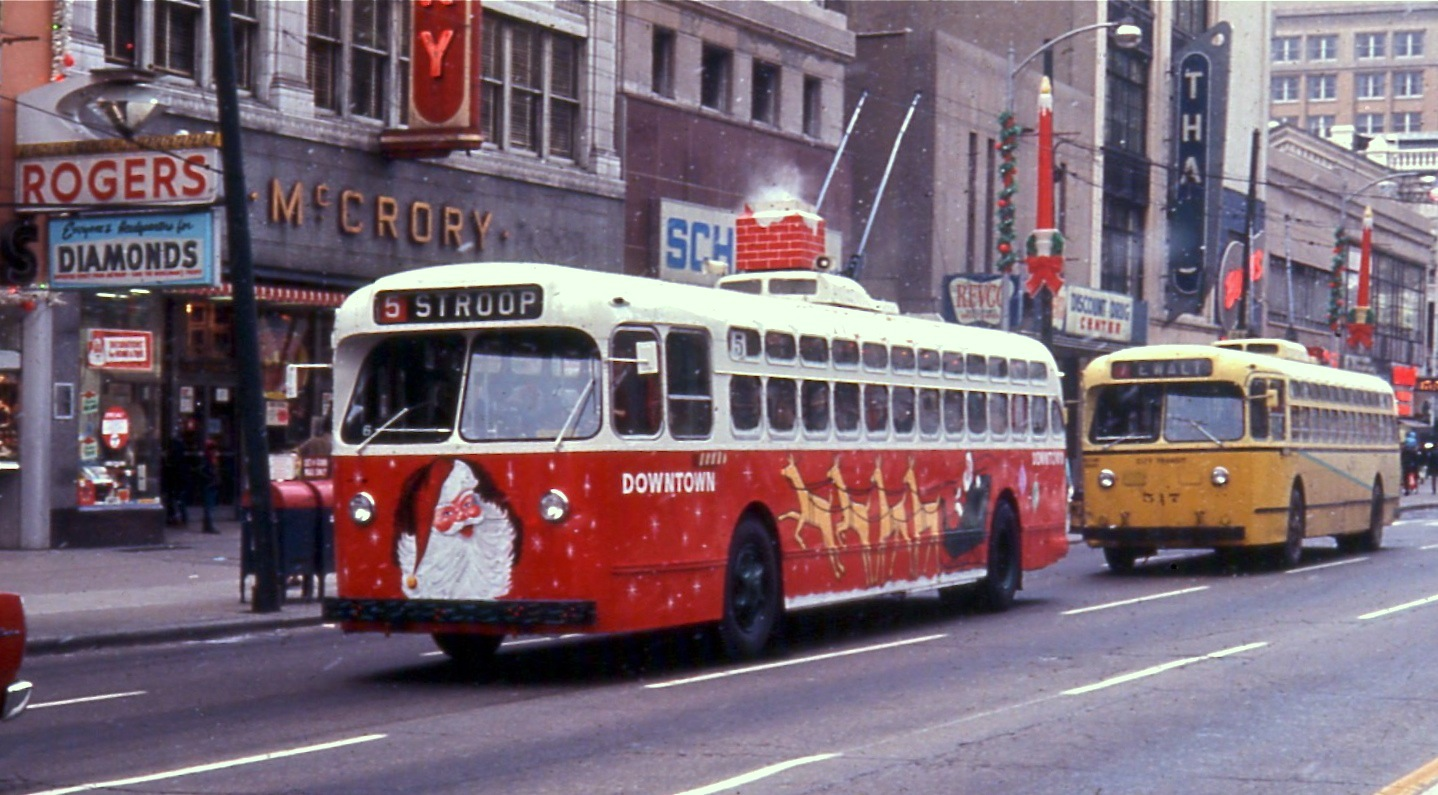
The Dayton Christmas Trolley, a seasonal tradition begun by CT in the 1960s and continued by RTA into the 1980s, shown in 1968. In 1977, a different trolleybus with a different Christmas paint scheme replaced the one shown here.

After 1955, all public transit in Dayton was operated by the City Transit Company. The transit system was transferred from private to public ownership on November 5, 1972, when the newly formed Miami Valley Regional Transit Authority (MVRTA) took over the City Transit Company's system. MVRTA changed its name to the Greater Dayton Regional Transit Authority (GDRTA) around May 2002. The name is commonly shortened simply to RTA.

The RTA voted to continue trolleybus operation, and in the mid-1970s replaced the aging fleet of Marmon-Herrington trolleybuses with 64 Flyer E800 units, delivered in 1977.

In the late 1980s, the Dayton trolleybus system was headed towards closure. RTA's board of trustees voted in 1988 to phase out trolleybus operation, but this decision was reversed in 1991, after a consultant's study report indicated that retaining trolleybus service was the most cost-effective option over the long term, as well as having environmental benefits. Following this decision, RTA began refurbishing some of its Flyer trolleybuses, to ensure they would continue to operate reliably until a fleet of new trolleybuses could be purchased and put into service, in a few years' time.

Over the period 1996–99, the Flyer E800s were replaced by a new fleet of 57 vehicles built by Electric Transit, Inc. (ETI), based on an existing model of the Czech company Skoda (and partially built by Skoda), with final assembly taking place in Dayton. ETI was a joint venture owned 65% by Skoda and 35% by the U.S. company, AAI Corporation.

The ETI vehicles were, in turn, replaced in the late 2010s by a new fleet of 45 dual-mode trolleybuses built by Gillig and Kiepe Electric (see below), with the last ETI vehicles being retired in October 2019 and the last 10 Gillig/Kiepe vehicles entering service in December 2020.

== Current routes ==
In the 2010s, trolleybuses were operating on seven RTA routes. Since 1988, it has been the same seven routes, but with some changes made to the routings or service levels. These are routes:

- 1 - East Third Street / West Third Street
- 2 - Lexington / East 5th Street
- 3 - Wayne Avenue
- 4 - Hoover / Xenia-Linden
- 5 - Valley Street / Far Hills
- 7 - North Main / Watervliet
- 8 - Salem / Lakeview.

(A slash indicates a route that runs in two different directions from downtown Dayton; such routes are sometimes referred to as two routes, e.g. as 1E and 1W, or as "5-north" and "5-south".)

Trolleybuses normally provided all of the service on routes 4, 5, 7, and 8, except when service was temporarily disrupted by major road construction, but routes 1, 2, and 3 used trolleys only on a few trips in the weekday rush hour and were otherwise served by diesel or hybrid buses. Following a systemwide RTA service restructuring implemented in January 2007, route 5 had only one round trip in each peak period, most of its previous service having been taken over by a parallel diesel bus route, the route 6.

In 2019–2020, after a new fleet of trolleybuses capable of running away from the overhead wires for a portion of the time in regular service was acquired, use of trolleybuses on route 1 was gradually expanded to all-day. Weekend use of trolleybuses resumed in January 2021, for the first time since May 2010 (the "trolleybus" routes had been using solely diesel or hybrid buses on weekends). Route 2 has not used any trolleybuses since early 2019, but RTA is planning to reinstate trolleybus service on the route eventually, running all day, after needed upgrades to the power-supply system have been made. In June 2021, all service on routes 3 and 5 was suspended indefinitely and in July 2022 the routes were cancelled due to driver shortage and low ridership. Later in 2022 trolleybus service on route 1 was also suspended. In 2024 the city of Oakwood decided to remove all trolleybus infrastructure from their neighborhood because they considered it aesthetically unpleasing, along the former route 5. On 31 August 2025 trolleybus service returned to route 1, with the eastern terminus moved to Eastown Hub, and route 3, which took over the northern part of the former route 5.

As of October 2025, trolleybuses operate on the following 5 routes, of which routes 1, 3, 7, and 8 include off-wire sections:

- 1 - Westown Hub / Eastown Hub via Third Street and Drexel
- 3 - Valley Street / Eastown Hub via Troy and Wayne
- 4 - Westown Hub / Eastown Hub via Hoover and Xenia
- 7 - North Main at Meijer / Eastown Hub via Watervliet
- 8 - Northwest Hub / Westown Hub via Salem and Lakeview

== Fleet ==
=== Past fleet ===
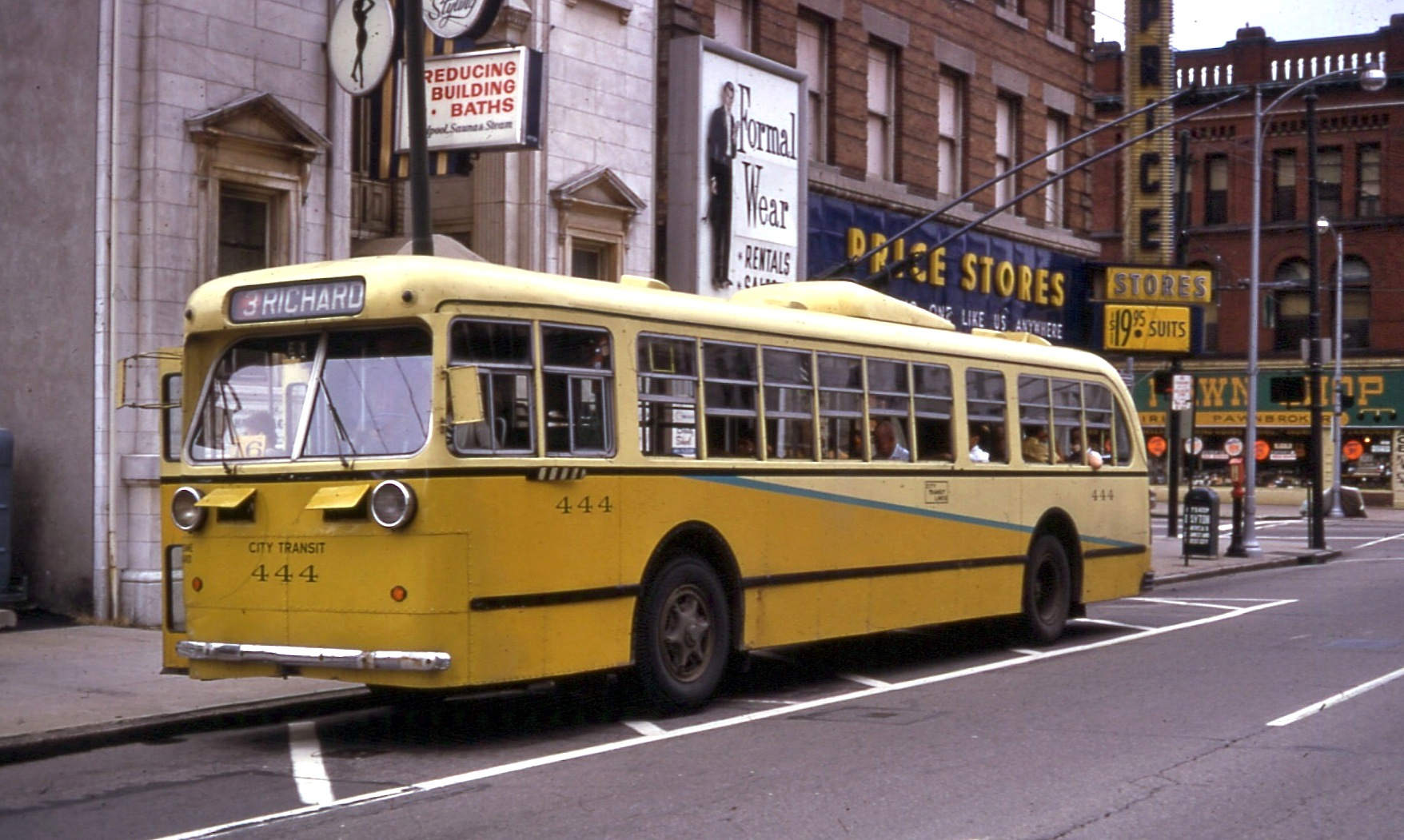
City Transit Company Pullman trolleybus 444 in downtown Dayton in 1968

Dayton's first trolleybuses were supplied by the J. G. Brill Company, in 1933. Vehicles purchased later included additional Brills, along with ETBs built by Pullman-Standard and Marmon-Herrington. Most of these were newly built vehicles, but between 1956 and 1965 the City Transit Company made several purchases of used trolleybuses from other cities, acquiring 21 Brills from Little Rock, Arkansas, and Indianapolis, Indiana; and 75 Marmon-Herringtons from four cities: Little Rock; Cincinnati, Ohio; Columbus, Ohio and Kansas City, Missouri. By the end of the 1960s, the system's last Brill trolleybuses had been retired, as had most of the Pullmans, but a few of latter remained in use into the period of RTA ownership, being stored in 1973 and eventually scrapped. Marmon-Herrington trolleybuses thereby comprised almost the entire fleet at the time of transfer of the system to public ownership in 1972.

A notable purchase of a single trolleybus occurred in 1971, when the City Transit Company purchased a model E700A trolleybus from Western Flyer Coach (now known as New Flyer Industries). It was the first new trolley coach purchased by any U.S. transit system since 1955. Numbered 900, its electric motors and control equipment were taken from two of CT's retired Brill trolleybuses, but all else was new, and the vehicle was widely considered to be a new trolleybus. The MVRTA was formed in 1971, and in late 1972 purchased the entire City Transit system, including its fleet of vehicles. In 1974, Flyer discontinued its model E700, replacing it with model E800.

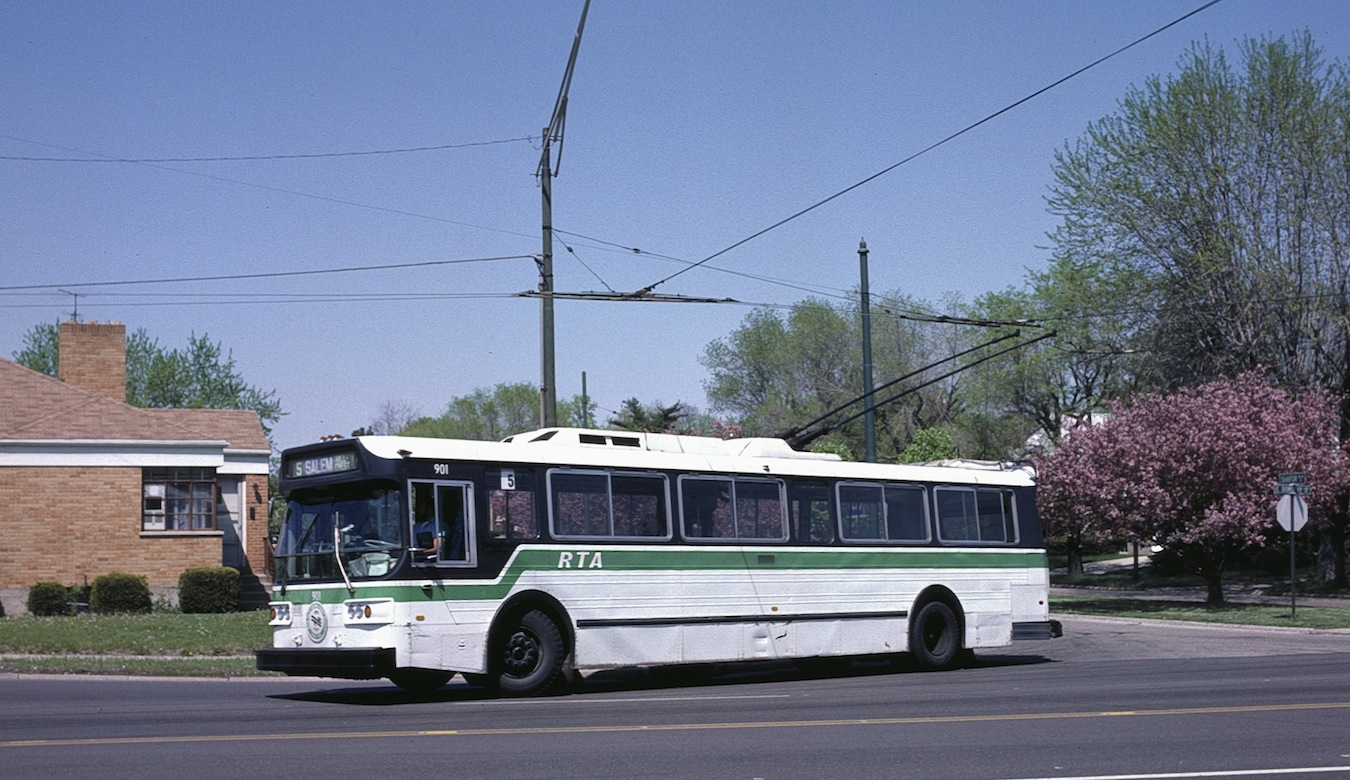
One of Dayton's 64 Flyer E800 trolleybuses, in 1987

MVRTA placed an order for 64 Flyer E800 trolleybuses in January 1975. The first two were delivered in late 1976 and the remainder in 1977. They were the city's first air-conditioned trolleybuses. Wheelchair lifts were retrofitted to them in 1983. The last Marmon-Herrington trolleybuses were withdrawn from service in October 1982. Flyer trolleybuses then comprised the entire fleet (for normal service) until the mid-1990s. RTA acquired two 1981–82 Brown-Boveri-built, GM "New Look"-body trolleybuses from the Edmonton Transit System, in Canada, in 1995, retrofitted wheelchair lifts to them, and placed them in service in 1996.

Anticipating retiring its 1976–77 Flyers at about 20 years of age, RTA began considering options for purchasing new vehicles, and in 1994 the agency placed an order with Electric Transit, Inc. for 63 new trolleybuses. The order was later reduced to 61 vehicles, and ultimately to 57. Between 1996 and 1999, these replaced all of the Flyer buses. The two ex-Edmonton vehicles, which were not air-conditioned, were both withdrawn from service by mid-2002.

==== ETI ====
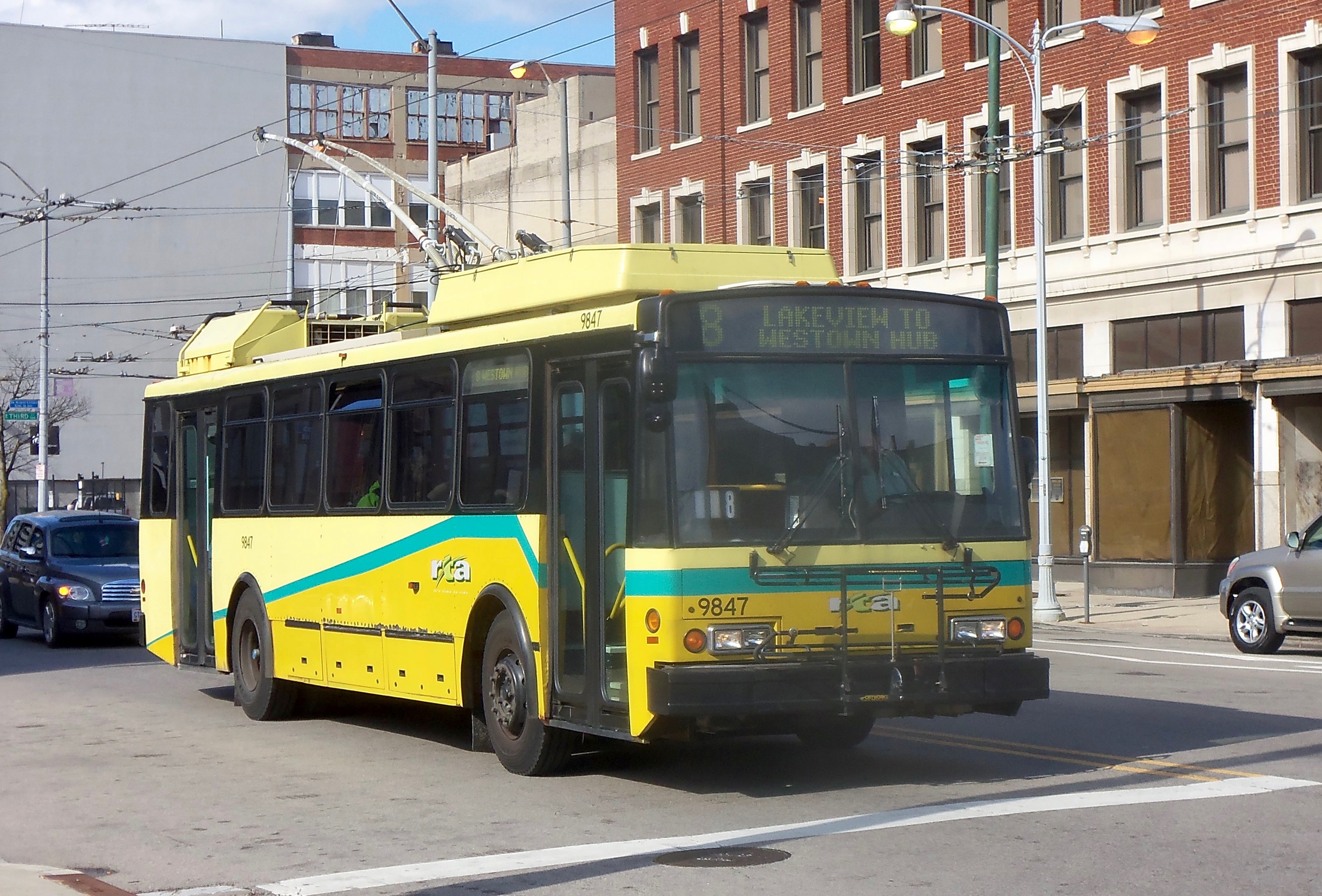
One of the 57 trolleybuses built by Electric Transit, Inc., in downtown in 2016

Dayton's first ETI trolleybuses were three prototypes built in 1995 and delivered to RTA in late December 1995 and January 1996. Numbered 9601–9603 in RTA's fleet, they were model 14TrE. The E in the model number is a suffix standing for "export", because the 14TrE model was Skoda's first 14Tr model designed for the North American market, which market had requirements that had not applied in Europe, including that wheelchair lifts be included. At the time (and for many years prior), Skoda was one of the largest manufacturers of trolleybuses in the world and it had been producing variations of its model 14Tr since 1974, making about 3,350 of that model by 1999.

The suffix E2 denotes the production series of the export model, which incorporated several changes adopted after testing of the three prototypes, in particular relocation of the wheelchair lift from the rear door to the front door and, necessitated by that change, widening of the body. The single-pane windshield was replaced by a two-piece one, and the rear window was made smaller. The length of the 57 ETI vehicles, both models, is 37 feet 8 inches (11.5 m)—slightly shorter than the 40-foot (12 m) standard length for U.S. transit buses. The width was 98.4 inches (2.5 m) for the three prototypes, but was increased to 102 inches (2.6 m) (the standard transit bus width in the U.S.) for the 54 production-series units.

The three 1995 ETI prototypes, Nos. 9601–9603, all entered service in April 1996. The production-series ETIs, the 9800s, began to arrive in January 1998 and entered service between May 1998 and September 1999. By about mid-2004, the 9600s were no longer in regular use. They were retired in 2006, because RTA was having trouble obtaining parts for them, given that they were a small batch of a unique model (not used by any other trolleybus system) and had many differences from the production-series vehicles, RTA's 9800s. As of autumn 2013, 35 of the 54 9800-series ETIs were on active status.

With its fleet having reached 15 years of age by that time, RTA began making plans to purchase replacement vehicles, with plans to test new models and a goal of being ready to place an order by 2016, when the fleet will be about 18 years old. After testing four prototype Gillig/Kiepe dual-mode trolleybuses, two equipped with auxiliary diesel engine and two with batteries, RTA placed an order for 41 new trolleybuses with batteries, which were delivered in the course of 2019 and 2020. The last Skoda/ETI trolleybuses were retired in October 2019.

=== Current fleet ===
The present Dayton trolleybus fleet comprises two types of trolleybuses, two model DMDT and 43 model DMBT:

Fleet numbers	Image	Quantity	Manufacturer	Electrical equipment	Model	Configuration	Year built	Notes
1401–1402		2	Vossloh Kiepe/Gillig (Note: Vossloh Kiepe was the primary contractor for these four vehicles, and Gillig (which provided the bodies and chassis) was a subcontractor.) (Note: Vossloh Kiepe was sold by Vossloh in 2016 and renamed Kiepe Electric GmbH, so the lead contractor for the four 2014 prototypes and 41 production-series vehicles was effectively the same company, but its name was changed during the period between the production of the two groups.)	Vossloh Kiepe	DMDT (with Gillig BRT Plus body)	Standard (two-axle), low-floor	2014	Prototypes
1403–1404		2	Vossloh Kiepe/Gillig	Vossloh Kiepe	DMBT (with BRT Plus body)	Standard (two-axle), low-floor	2014	Prototypes
1951–1971; 2051–2070		41	Kiepe/Gillig	Kiepe Electric	DMBT (with BRT Plus body)	Standard (two-axle), low-floor	2019–2020	
Model abbreviations: DMDT: Dual-mode diesel/trolley. DMBT: Dual-mode battery/trolley.

==== Dual-mode buses ====
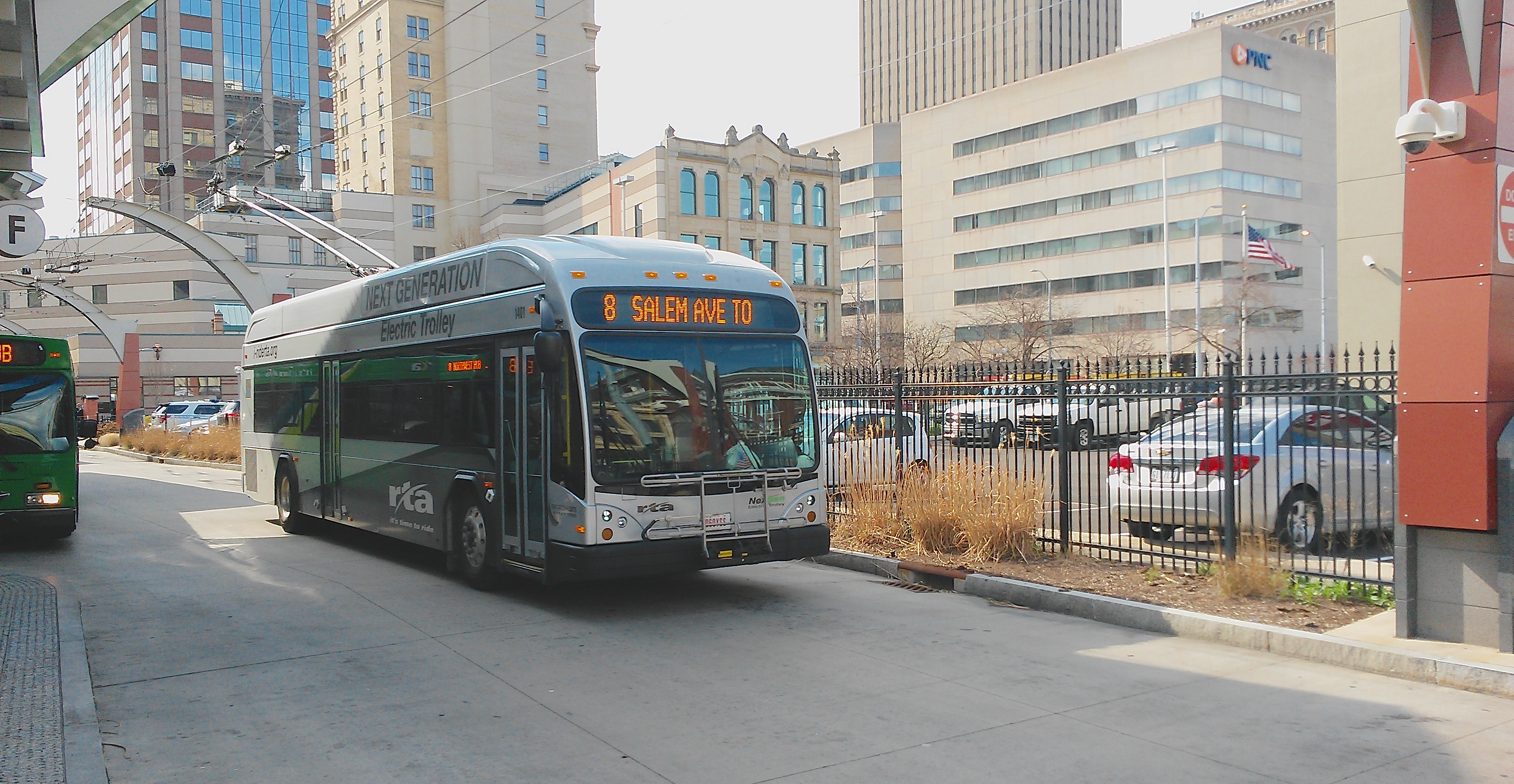
One of the four prototype dual-mode buses, which originally wore this silver paint scheme, at Wright Stop Plaza transit center in 2016

In May 2013, RTA placed an order with Vossloh Kiepe for four prototype low-floor, dual-mode buses, the first of which (No. 1401) arrived on September 29, 2014, and the other three between November 2014 and January 2015. Gillig provided the bus bodies, using its "BRT Plus" model, into which the Vossloh Kiepe propulsion equipment was installed. All four are capable of operating as trolleybuses, but for operation away from the trolley wires, two use a diesel-powered generator to power the traction motors (similar to a hybrid bus) and two use batteries only. At the time, no Vossloh Kiepe model numbers were reported, but the company eventually adopted the designations DMDT, for dual-mode diesel/trolley, and DMBT, for dual-mode battery/trolley, for the two respective types. More broadly, it referred to the technology as "NexGen", for Next Generation, a branding that RTA has also used when referring to the new vehicles. The prototype buses began to enter service in early 2015, running in both trolley mode and diesel or battery mode, for evaluation. It was planned that after testing, which was expected to last about one year, RTA would choose between the two designs and consider placing an order large enough to replace its entire ETI trolleybus fleet. In 2015, RTA had already included in its budgeting for future years $43 million for an eventual purchase of 41 more Gillig/Vossloh Kiepe dual-mode buses, for delivery by 2019, if testing of the four prototype vehicles showed the design to be reliable and worth the cost. Of the two alternative designs, the one using batteries for operation away from the trolley wires was chosen at the conclusion of testing; they carry RTA fleet numbers 1403 and 1404.

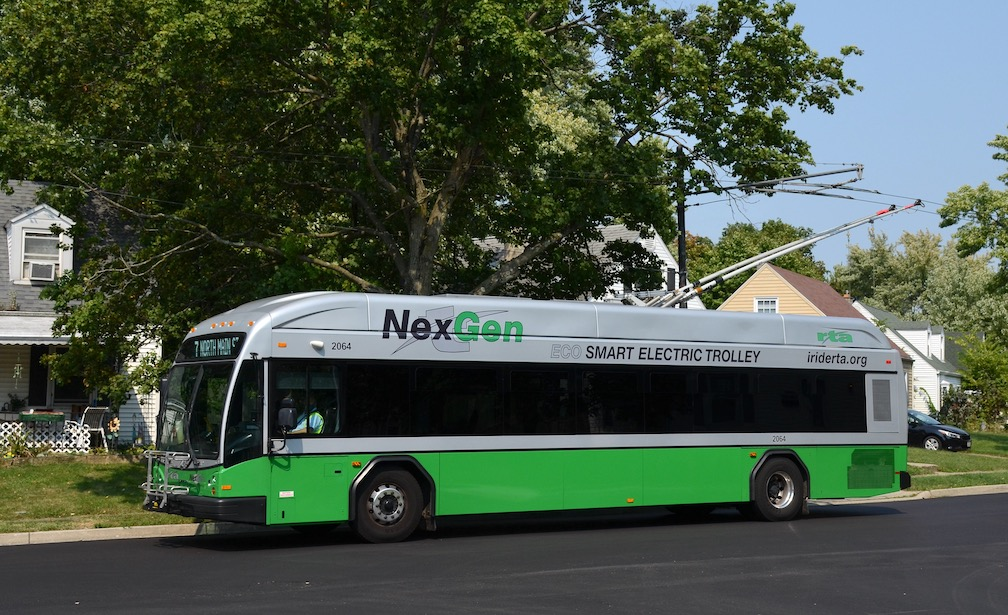
2020-built Gillig/Vossloh Kiepe No. 2064 in the green-and-silver paint scheme that RTA adopted for trolleybuses in 2018

In fall 2016, RTA's board of trustees approved moving ahead with an acquisition of at least 26 additional dual-mode buses, once federal officials approved the final design; that approval was received at the beginning of 2018. In January 2018, RTA placed an order with Kiepe – which meanwhile had been sold by Vossloh and renamed Kiepe Electric – for 26 production-series dual-mode buses of the same type as prototypes 1403–1404, with bodies and chassis supplied by Gillig as a subcontractor to Kiepe. The final assembly of all but the first two or three vehicles was originally planned to take place in Dayton, but that plan was later dropped, in exchange for an accelerated production schedule. In November 2018, RTA placed an order with Kiepe for an additional 15 buses of the same type.

In April 2018, prototype No. 1404 was repainted in a new green-and-silver paint scheme which RTA said it intended to use for the new vehicles on order. (By spring 2021, all three other prototypes had been repainted in the newer colors.)

The 41 production-series Gillig-Kiepe trolleybuses were delivered in the course of 2019 and 2020, the first one (No. 1951) arriving on May 3, 2019, and entering service on November 21, 2019. By October 2019, enough had been delivered and accepted to replace the remaining Skoda/ETI trolleybuses. The last 10 Kiepe trolleybuses entered service in December 2020.

=== Preserved trolleybuses ===
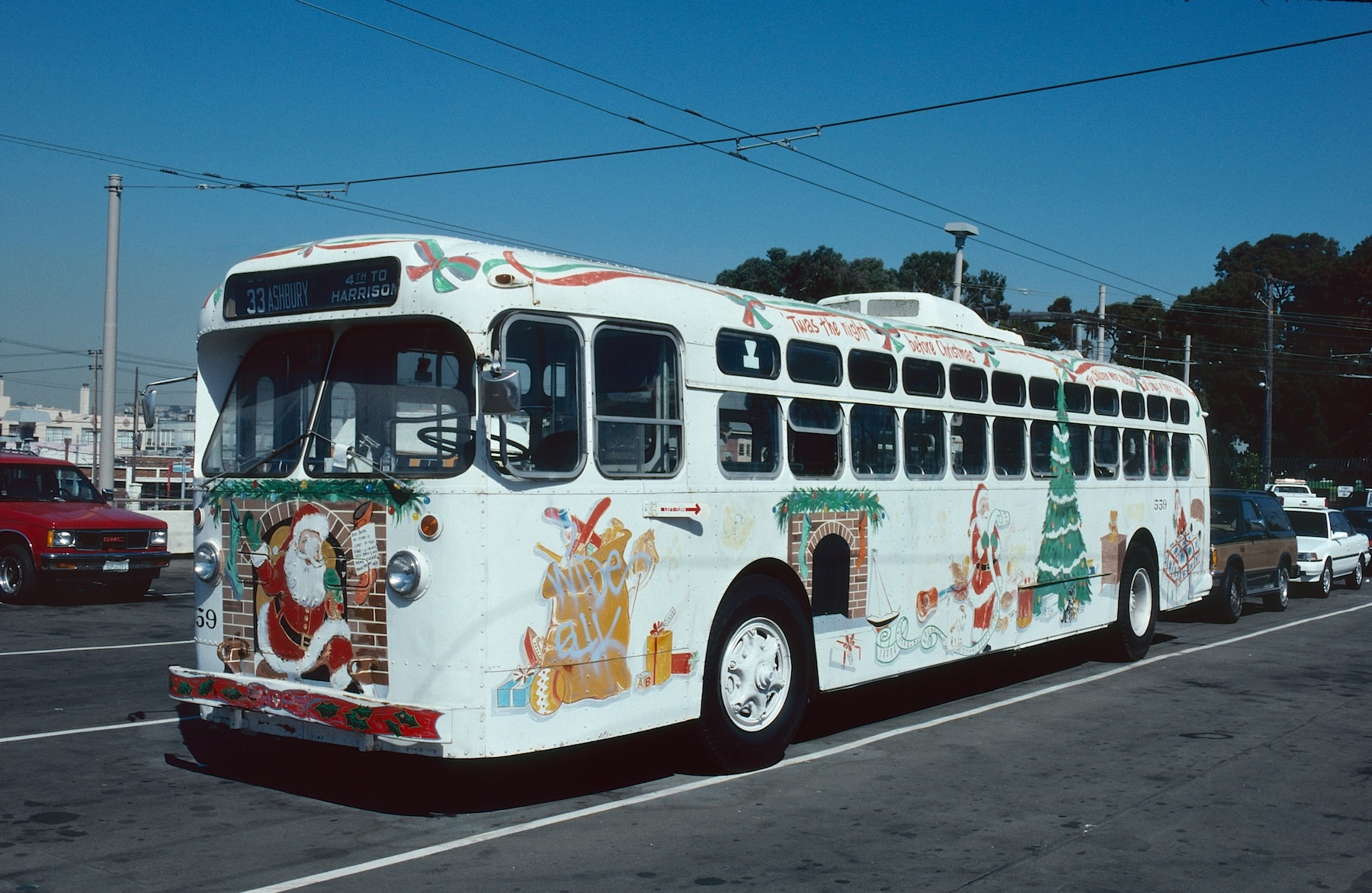
Christmas Trolley 559 in 1993, before returning to Dayton from San Francisco

Several retired Dayton trolleybuses have been saved for historical preservation, including at public museums. No. 559, a 1948 Marmon-Herrington that was the last of two trolleybuses to be painted in Christmas paint schemes by City Transit or RTA in the 1960s and 1970s, returned to Dayton in 2021 after 32 years in San Francisco. Earlier, it was operated in service in Dayton annually at Christmastime until December 1987, more than five years after the last vehicles of its type were retired from normal service. In 1989, at a time when RTA was planning to close its trolleybus system, No. 559 was donated to the San Francisco Municipal Railway (San Francisco's transit system), which had a history of preserving and operating vintage streetcars and trolleybuses, including in its Historic Trolley Festivals, arriving there in September 1989. It kept the Christmas paint scheme it had been given in 1977 and operated in service on the San Francisco trolleybus system during the Christmas season each year from 1989 through 1993, but then was stored with minor defects and never returned to operation. In 2021, RTA requested No. 559's return, and it arrived back in Dayton in November 2021. RTA repaired it in 2024 and the "Christmas Trolley" returned to service on public trips on a loop route within downtown Dayton on several days between late November and late December 2024. A similar operation took place in 2025.

RTA also has several other historic trolleybuses in its fleet. Unique 1971 Flyer E700A No. 900 has been preserved by RTA; it is not available for public viewing, but in 2025 the agency began work to restore it to operating condition. 1949 Marmon-Herrington-built trolleybus 515 was kept in operating condition by RTA as a historic vehicle, and between 1984 and 1987 it operated occasional special-event trips on the system; since 1988, it has been on static display at the Carillon Historical Park in southern Dayton. Another Marmon-Herrington, No. 501, is kept in storage by RTA. Flyer E800 Nos. 916, 937 and 953, ex-Edmonton BBC HR150G Nos. 109 and 110 and Skoda/ETI Nos. 9602, 9834, and 9835 are preserved by RTA, but are not available for public viewing.

The Illinois Railway Museum's collection includes ex-Dayton (City Transit) Pullman trolleybus 435, two ex-Dayton Flyer E800s, Nos. 906 and 925, and ex-Dayton Skoda/ETI 9809. Skoda/ETI 9803 was donated and returned to the Czech Republic where it is on display at a public transport museum in Strašice, near Plzeň; its new owner, Československý Dopravák, intends to operate it at the museum eventually, after completion of a currently incomplete trolleybus line there. Additional historic ex-Dayton trolleybuses have been saved by others.

== See also ==
- List of trolleybus systems in the United States
