= Greater Dayton Regional Transit Authority =

- Founded: 1972
- Headquarters: 4 South Main St, Dayton, Ohio
- Service area: Montgomery County and Greene County, Ohio
- Service type: bus service, trolleybus, express bus, paratransit
- Routes: 18
- Stops: +2,500
- Hubs: Eastown Shopping Center; Westown Shopping Center; Northwest; South (Dayton Mall); Wright Stop Plaza (Downtown Dayton)
- Stations: Maintenance Facilities, 600 Longworth St, Dayton
- Fleet: 260
- Daily ridership: 23,000 (weekdays, Q4 2025)
- Annual ridership: 5,750,500 (2025)
- Fuel type: Diesel, Electric and Hybrid
- Operator: 350
- Website: i-riderta.org

The Greater Dayton Regional Transit Authority, formerly known as the Miami Valley RTA, is a public transit agency that generally serves the greater Dayton, Ohio area. The GDRTA serves communities within Montgomery County and parts of Greene County, Ohio, USA. There are 18 routes. RTA operates diesel and electric trolley buses seven days a week, 21 hours a day, and provides services to many citizens within the area. RTA's current CEO is Bob Ruzinsky. In 2025, the system had a ridership of 5,750,500, or about 23,000 per weekday as of the fourth quarter of 2025.

Greater Dayton RTA is Ohio’s fourth-largest public transit system, serving Dayton and 23 surrounding communities in Montgomery County and parts of Greene County.

== History ==
Former GDRTA Logo

The Miami Valley Regional Transit Authority (now the Greater Dayton Regional Transit Authority, or RTA) took over public transit operations in November 1972. In 2003, its board of trustees voted to change the transit agency's name to the Greater Dayton Regional Transit Authority.

The RTA has been involved in helping the city of Dayton through its contributions to the Dayton Dragons, The Schuster Center, and the Dayton Aviation Heritage National Historical Park.

In addition, RTA passed a resolution to make smoother connections to its regional hubs and prevent misuse of transfers. In January 2007, RTA created an established proposal to make all buses serve regional businesses, establish transfer points in designated areas and streamline previously neighborhood routes. The RTA added two routes to serve areas frequently used by passengers. RTA discontinued eight routes in response to overlapping and low passenger counts.

=== Trolley buses ===
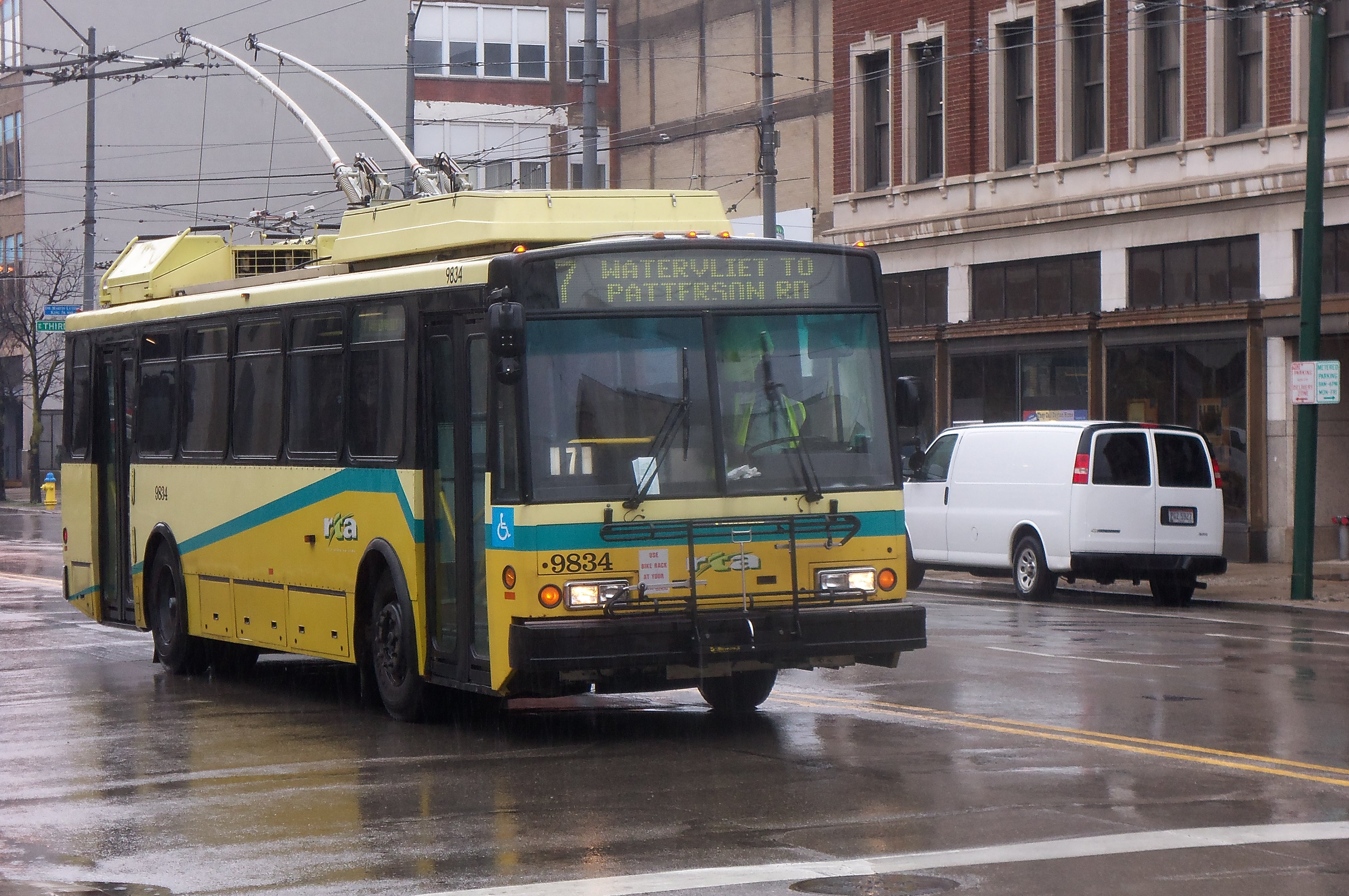
From the late 1990s until 2019, the trolley bus system used vehicles built by Electric Transit, Inc.

One notable feature of the GDRTA system is its use of electric trolley buses. Only five cities in the United States currently have electric trolley buses: Boston, Dayton, Philadelphia, San Francisco and Seattle. The first electric trolley bus (ETB) operation in Ohio occurred in Dayton, on April 23, 1933, when the Linden–Salem line was converted from streetcars to trackless trolleys — or trolley buses, as they are most commonly known today. The RTA renewed its commitment to electric transit with a board of trustees vote to continue the trolley bus service in 1991, and the purchase of a new fleet of ETBs from Electric Transit, Inc., a joint venture of the Czech company Skoda and the U.S. company AAI Corporation, based on Skoda's model 14Tr. Final assembly of the vehicles took place in Dayton in 1995–98. In 2014, the system added its first low-floor trolley buses, with four dual-mode prototypes purchased from Vossloh Kiepe (now Kiepe Electric) and using bodies from Gillig, for testing and evaluation. In January 2018, RTA placed an order with Kiepe for 26 production-series dual-mode trolleybuses of the same design as the prototypes, with Gillig low-floor bodies, for delivery starting in 2019.

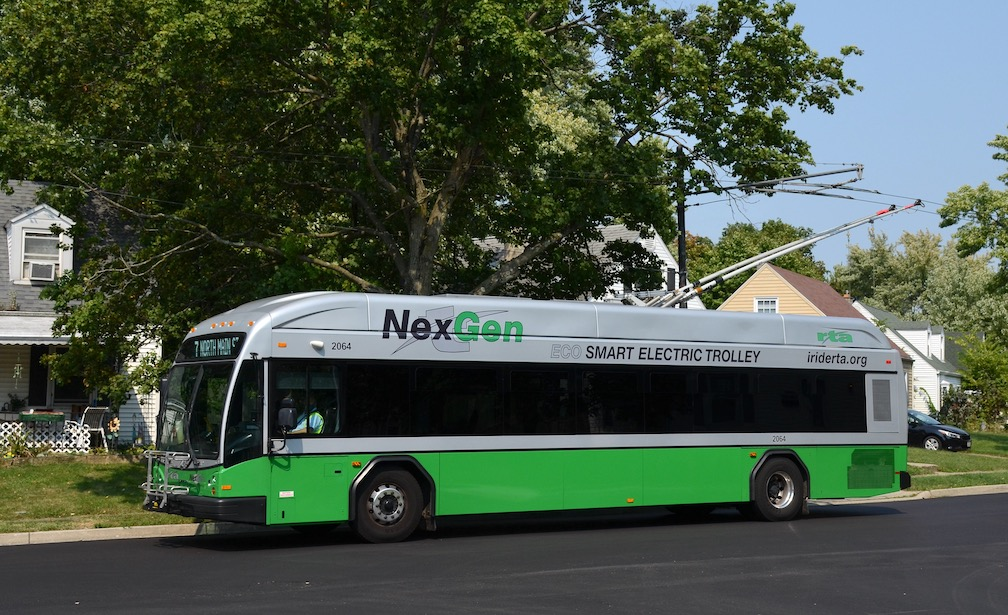
One of RTA's current fleet of 45 Gillig/Kiepe dual-mode trolley buses in 2021

Electric streetcar service in Dayton had started in 1888, and it continued through to, and indeed beyond, the start of the trolley bus service. Therefore, electric transit service has been operated continuously in Dayton since 1888, which is longer than in any other city in the United States.

== Operations ==
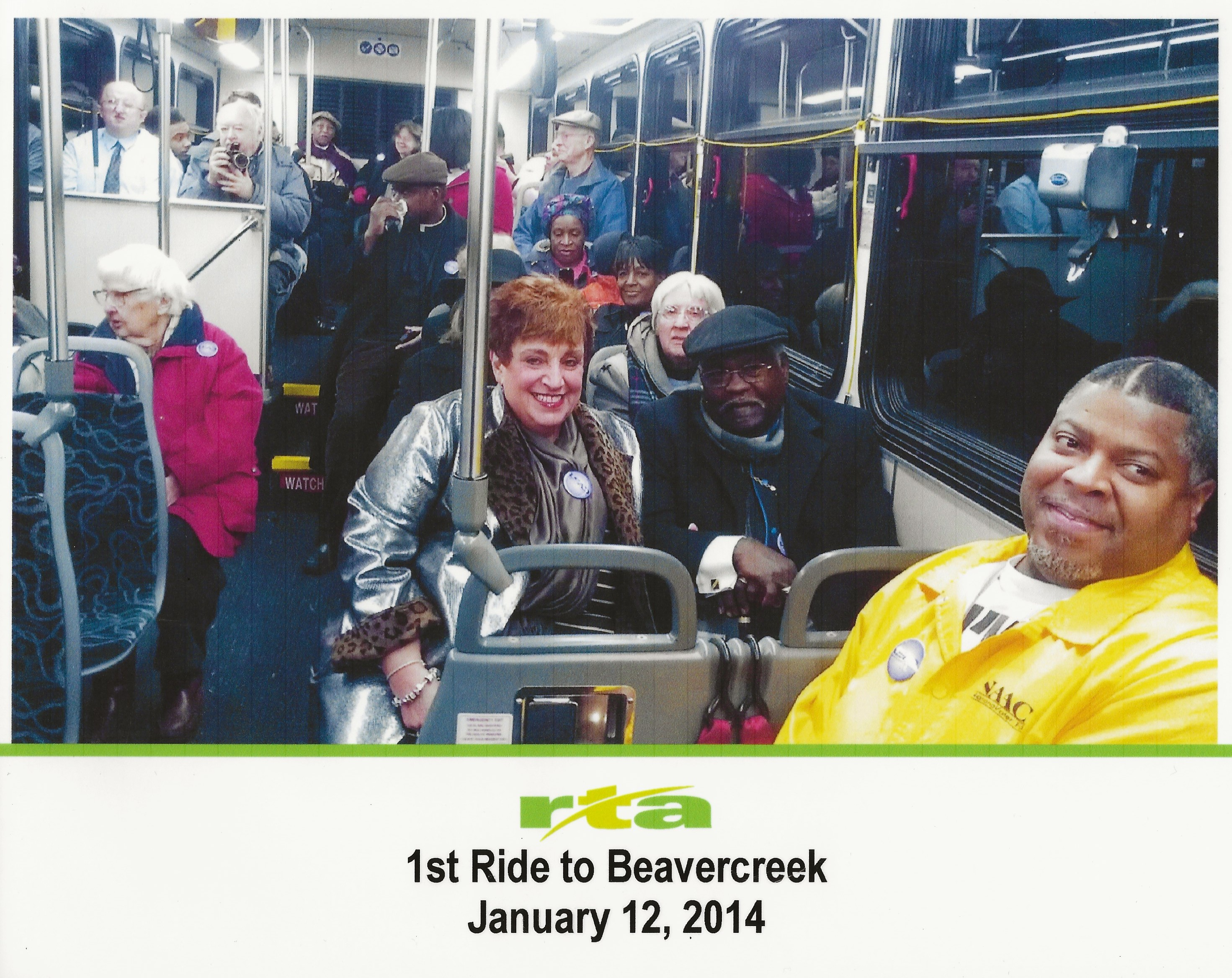
Dayton NAACP President Dr. Derrick L. Foward along with many other Civil Rights activist take the first bus ride in Beavercreek, Ohio.

The RTA operates with diesel and electric trolley buses. Dayton is the smallest city in the United States to operate electric trolley buses still. The trolley buses travel at least five miles on RTA routes serving Dayton and some neighboring suburbs. The routes include: Route 1, Route 2, Route 4, Route 7 and Route 8. Bus service to Dayton International Airport from downtown Dayton began on 11 August 2013. After three years of heated negotiations between the Regional Transit Authority, City of Beavercreek, Leaders for Basic Equality and Action in Dayton (LEAD) and the Dayton Branch NAACP, service was expanded to stops on Pentagon Boulevard in Beavercreek, allowing access to the Fairfield Commons Mall and Soin Medical Center, on January 12, 2014.

=== Hubs ===
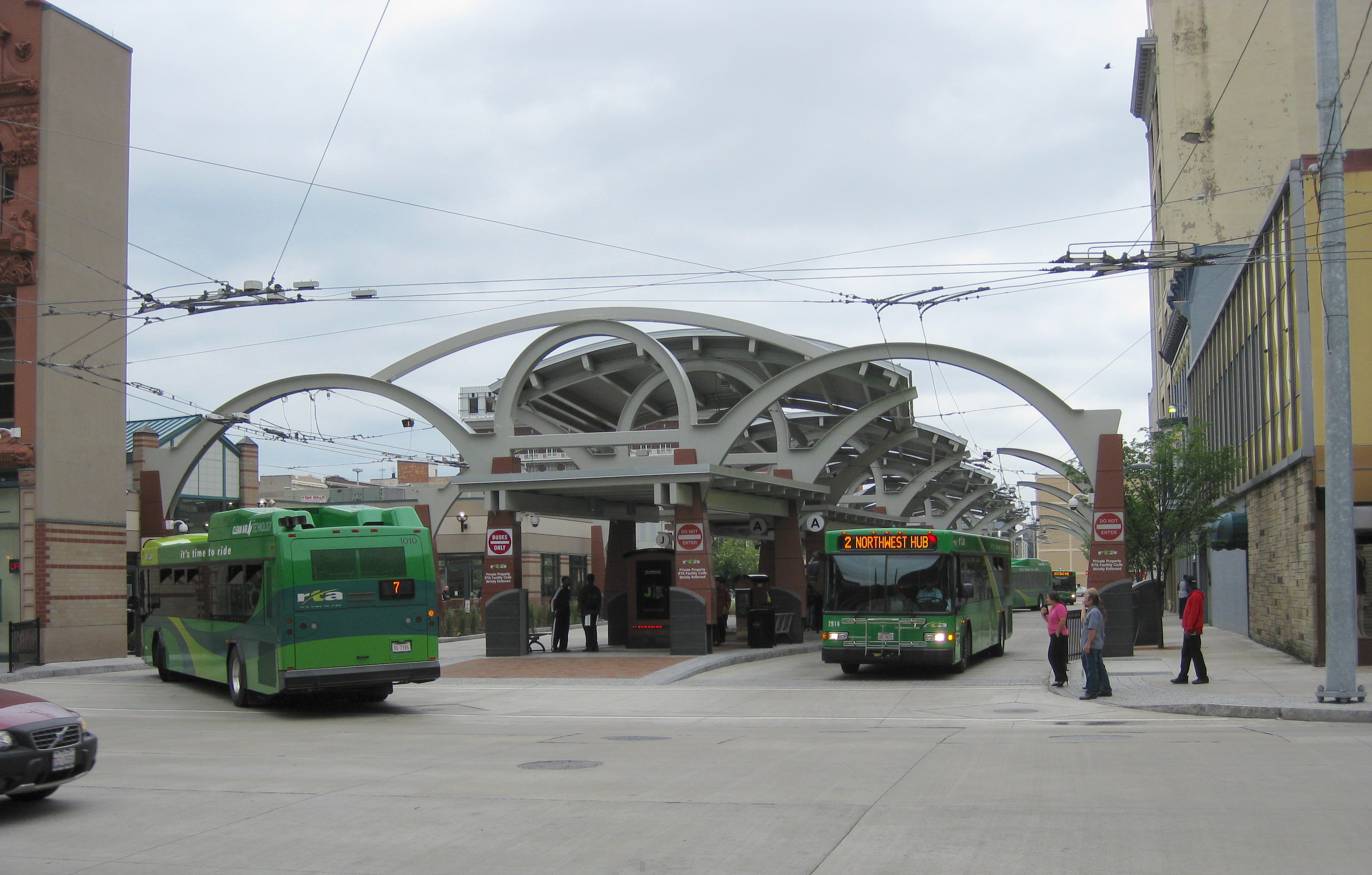
Wright Stop Plaza Transit Center, viewed from across Main Street in 2010

The RTA operates five bus "hubs", or transit centers. Each hub serves as a connection to many suburban bus routes around Dayton. The one in downtown Dayton is named Wright Stop Plaza and opened for service on September 1, 2009 (after a ceremonial opening earlier).

== Routes ==
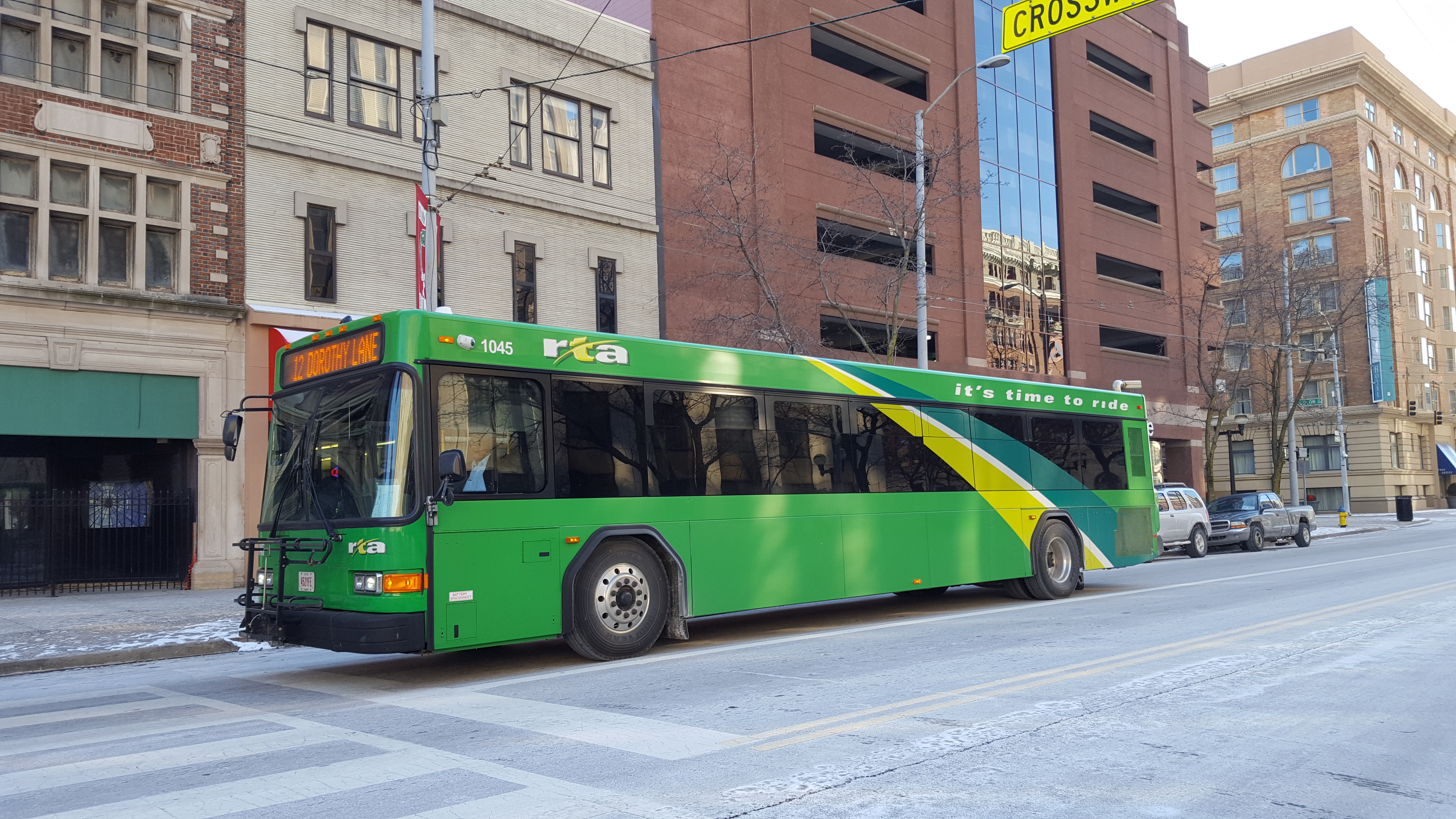
A 2010 Gillig Low Floor bus in downtown, on route 12, in 2017

As of August 31, 2025, RTA operates the following routes.

- 1 Pentagon Blvd-Wright State University-Third St-Westown TC-Drexel
- 2 Linden Ave-Eastown TC-Otterbein-Lexington-Northwest TC
- 4 Townview-Hoover-Delphos-Xenia Ave./Linden Ave.-Eastown TC-Westown TC
- 6 Centerville-Kettering-Downtown Dayton-Far Hills
- 7 North Main St-Shiloh-Downtown Dayton-Watervliet
- 8 Northwest TC-Salem Ave-Lakeview-Westown TC
- 9 Northwest TC-Greenwich Village-Westown TC
- 12 Five Oaks-Valerie Arms-Forrer Blvd-Dorothy Lane
- 16 Englewood-Kettering-Whipp & Bigger-Clyo Rd.
- 17 Vandalia-South TC
- 18 Huber Heights-Moraine-West Carrollton-Miamisburg
- 19 Huber Heights-Moraine-Miamisburg-South TC
- 22 Webster St-Poe Ave-Job Center-Miller Ln-Gateway-Westown TC
- 28 Kettering-Dorothy Ln-Kettering Medical Center-Stroop Rd-Kettering Rec Center
- 43 Dayton International Airport-Croc-Marshall's Dist Ctr
- 44 Chewy-Vandalia
- North Connector Trotwood-Northwest TC-Needmore-Harshman
- West Connector Northwest TC-Westown TC-South TC (mostly follows former Route 24)

== Fares ==
To date, GDRTA charges a $2.40 flat fare with a daily cap of $5.50. Discounts are available for senior citizens and people with disabilities. First responders and children under 13 years of age ride for free (3-kid limit applies, if under 13). Medicare riders, disabled & seniors at least 65 pay half the above rate, with rate capping at $2.75.

== Fleet ==
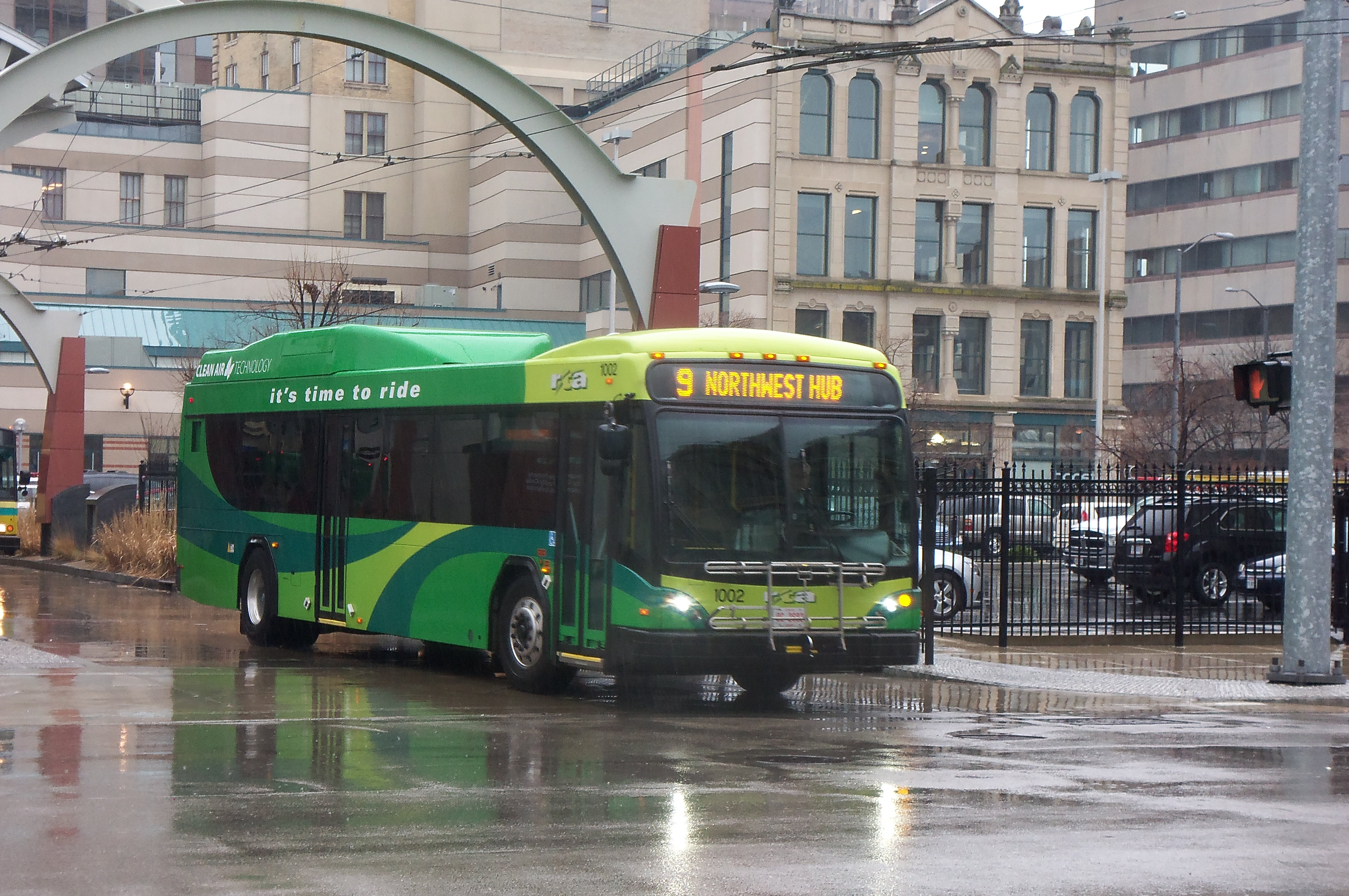
One of RTA's 2010-built hybrid buses leaving the downtown transit center, known as Wright Stop Plaza

With the addition of environmentally friendly hybrid buses in 2010 to the GDRTA's fleet, the GDRTA is Ohio's greenest transit fleet. In September 2010 RTA was designated the only 5-star Ohio Green Fleet by Clean Fuels Ohio.

=== Current fleet ===
Currently, GDRTA's fleet consists exclusively of Gillig-built buses, namely the Low Floor model and its BRT-styled derivative, the BRT.

Year	Manufacturer	Model	Photo	Fleet numbers	Notes
2018	Gillig	Low Floor 29'		1831-1834	
2023	Gillig	Low Floor 29'		2331-2358	
2016	Gillig	Low Floor 40'		1601-1624	
2017	Gillig	Low Floor 40'		1701-1725	
2018	Gillig	Low Floor 40'		1801-1824	
2019	Gillig	Low Floor 40'		1901-1917	
2021	Gillig	Low Floor 40'		2101-2111	
2020	Gillig	BRT 35'		2031-2037	Assigned exclusively to Flyer service
2013	Gillig	BRT Plus ETB 40'		1401-1404	Only for routes 1, 2, 4, 7, 8.
2019	Gillig	BRT Plus ETB 40'		1951-1971	Only for routes 1, 2, 4, 7, 8.
2020	Gillig	BRT Plus ETB 40'		2051-2070	Only for routes 1, 2, 4, 7, 8.

== See also ==
- List of bus transit systems in the United States
