= Electric Transit, Inc. =

Defunct trolleybus manufacturer in the United States

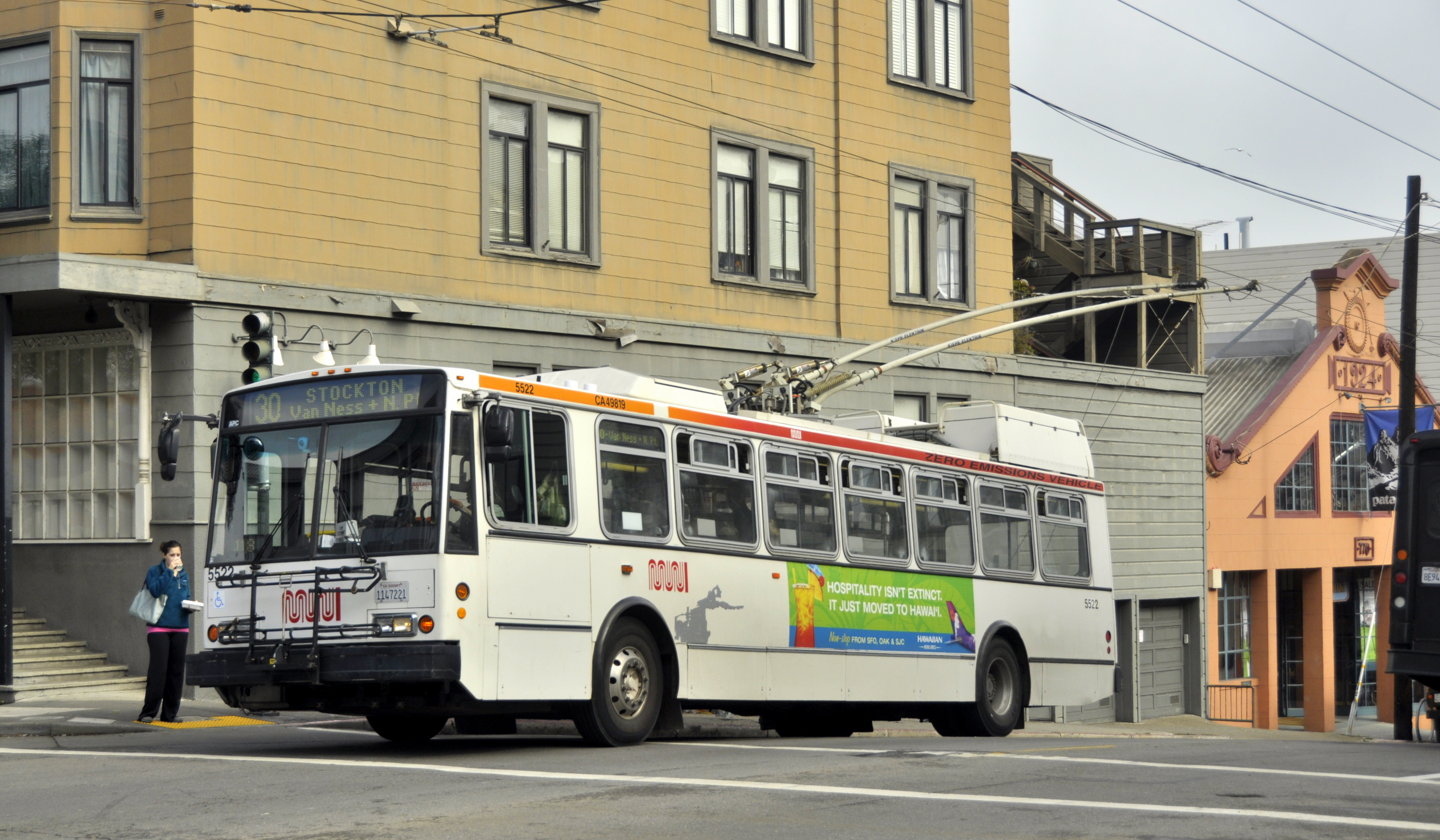
- An ETI trolleybus in San Francisco, 2014
- Industry: Transit
- Founded: 1994
- Defunct: 2004
- Fate: dissolved
- Headquarters: Hunt Valley, Maryland, United States
- Products: Trolleybuses

Electric Transit, Inc. (ETI) was a joint venture between the Škoda group in the Czech Republic and AAI Corporation in the United States which made trolleybuses for the Dayton and San Francisco trolleybus systems, constructing a total of 330 trolleybuses. ETI was formed in 1994, and ownership was divided as 65% by Škoda and 35% by AAI. The latter was a wholly owned subsidiary of United Industrial Corporation. Up to that time, Škoda had built more than 12,000 trolleybuses since 1935, but none for cities outside Europe and Asia. The ETI joint venture was dissolved in 2004, shortly after an unsuccessful bid to supply trolleybuses to Vancouver.

== Corporate history and production ==
ETI was formed in 1994 as a joint venture, with ownership divided as 65% by Škoda and 35% by AAI. The latter was a wholly owned subsidiary of United Industrial Corporation and was mainly a defense contractor. ETI originally was based in Dayton, but after completion of the contract for that city, the Dayton office was closed and ETI moved its administrative office to Hunt Valley, sharing space with partner AAI there.

AAI announced in 1999 its intent to acquire Škoda Ostrov, the trolleybus manufacturing division of Skoda, as well as the 65% share Škoda held in ETI. United Industrial announced it was selling its interest in ETI in September 2000 to RailWorks Corporation as it planned to exit the transportation market altogether, but RailWorks terminated the offer less than three weeks after the announcement.

In 2003, ETI engaged in a competitive bidding for a large contract (245 trolleybuses) being offered by TransLink, of Vancouver, B.C., Canada for supply of trolleybuses to the Vancouver trolleybus system, but lost out to New Flyer Industries. The joint venture did not seek any further new business, and in May 2004 it finalized an agreement with San Francisco Muni to transfer to Muni its remaining contractual obligations.

=== Contracts with Dayton and San Francisco ===
The company was awarded its first contract in November 1994, when the Miami Valley Regional Transit Authority, of Dayton, Ohio placed an order for 63 two-axle trolleybuses. The order was later reduced to 61 vehicles, and ultimately to 57. Three prototype trolleybuses were delivered in December 1995 and January 1996. These were designated by ETI as model 14TrE, the E standing for "export", and were given fleet numbers 9601–9603 by MVRTA. Following modifications to the design, construction of the 54 production-series ETI trolleybuses for Dayton took place in 1998–99. These were model 14TrE2 and were numbered 9801–9854 in MVRTA's fleet. Among the modifications were the moving of the wheelchair lift from the rear door to the front door, which necessitated widening the body from 98 in (2,500 mm) to 102 in (2,600 mm) and changing from a one-piece windshield to a two-piece one. The rear window was also made much smaller than it had been in the prototypes or any previous Skoda 14Tr.

In July 1997, San Francisco Muni contracted with ETI for the provision of 250 trolleybuses, comprising 220 standard/two-axle (40 ft (12 m)) and 30 articulated (60 ft (18 m)) vehicles. ETI designated the two types for San Francisco as models 14TrSF and 15TrSF, respectively.

In February 2000, Muni exercised contract options to purchase an additional 20 two-axle and three articulated vehicles. Two prototypes for the two-axle trolleybuses (numbered 5401–5402) were received by Muni in January 1999 and June 1999, respectively, while an articulated prototype (No. 7101) was received in April 2000. The 238 production-series two-axle trolleybuses (Nos. 5403–5640) were delivered between May 2001 and early 2004. The production-series articulateds (7102–7133) were all delivered in 2003. All 273 of Muni's ETI trolleybuses had entered service by April 2004.

The last ETI trolleybuses to operate in service on either of the two systems that purchased them did so on October 4, 2019, in Dayton, only four weeks after the last use of 14TrSF vehicles in service in San Francisco.

ETI trolleybus summary
Model	Image	Client	Nos.	Qty.	Dates			Notes	Ref.
Model	Image	Client	Nos.	Qty.	Ordered	Service	Retired	Notes	Ref.
14TrE		MVRTA (Dayton, Ohio)	9601–9603	3	1994	1996	2006	One-piece windshield, wheelchair lift at rear door.	
14TrE2		MVRTA (Dayton, Ohio)	9801–9854	54	1994	1998	2019	Width increased to 102 inches (2,590 mm) compared to prototypes 9601–9603. Retirement of last active units occurred in October 2019.	
14TrSF		Muni (San Francisco)	5401–5640	240	1997	2001	2019	Initial order of 220 expanded to 240 in 2000 via contract option. Two units (5401, 5402) delivered in 1999 for testing. Retirement of last active units occurred in September 2019.	
15TrSF		Muni (San Francisco)	7101–7133	33	1997	2002	2016	Initial order of 30 expanded to 33 in 2000 via contract option. One unit (7101) delivered in 2000 for testing. Retirement of last active units occurred in early May 2016.	

== Production ==
With both the Dayton and San Francisco orders, the chassis/body-frame (or shell) and motors of each vehicle were fabricated at Škoda's plant in Ostrov nad Ohří, Czech Republic, then shipped to a facility in Hunt Valley, Maryland (near other AAI facilities) for initial fitting-out. Except in the case of the prototypes, final fitting-out was undertaken in leased premises located in the two cities purchasing the vehicles, Dayton and San Francisco.

== See also ==
- List of trolleybus manufacturers (current and former trolleybus manufacturers)
- United Streetcar – another joint venture between Škoda and a U.S. company
