= Škoda 14Tr =

Czech trolleybus produced by Škoda

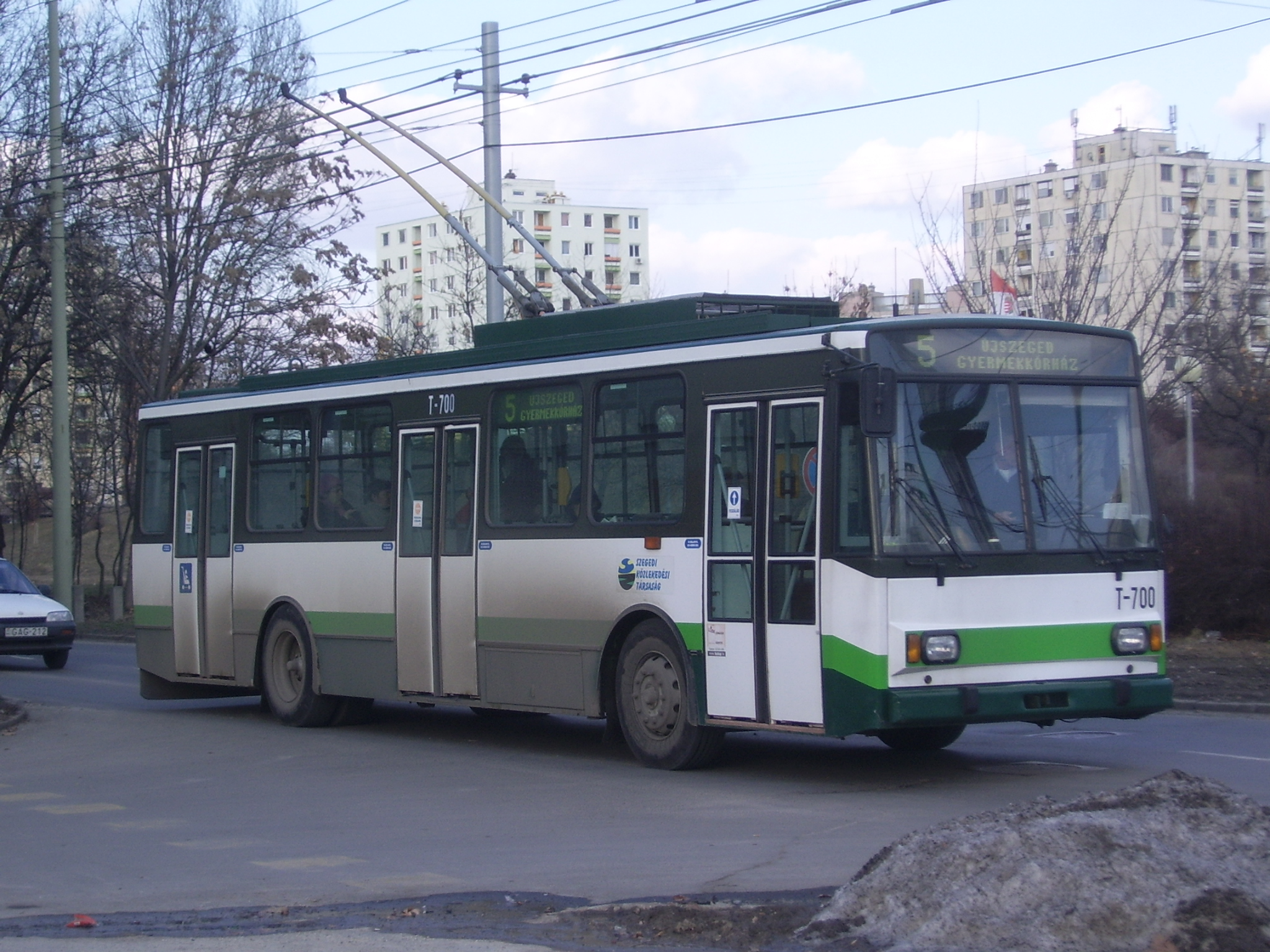
- Škoda 14Tr in Hungary

Overview
- Manufacturer: Škoda Works (1981–1995); Škoda Transportation (1995–1998)
- Production: 1981–1998

Body and chassis
- Class: Bus
- Body style: Single-deck
- Doors: 3 (optionally 2)
- Floor type: High-floor
- Chassis: semi-self-supporting with frame
- Related: 15Tr

Powertrain
- Electric motor: 600/750 VDC
- Capacity: seated: 24–29 (two doors); 32–41 (three doors) standing: 51–56 (two doors); 48–39 (three doors)
- Power output: 100–120 kW (134–161 hp)

Dimensions
- Length: 11.340 m (37 ft 2 1/2 in)
- Width: 2.500 m (8 ft 2 3/8 in)
- Height: 3.410 m (11 ft 2 1/4 in) (over poles)
- Curb weight: 10,000 kg (22,000 lb)

Chronology
- Predecessor: 9Tr, (T 11 prototype) Škoda T 11
- Successor: (17Tr prototype), 21Tr, 24Tr

The Škoda 14Tr is a Czech trolleybus that was produced from 1981 to 1998. Prototypes were built in 1972 and 1974.

After the unsuccessful attempt to merge the Karosa ŠM 11 bus and the Škoda T 11 trolleybus and the cancelled Škoda 13Tr project, a new style of trolleybus was designed in the early 1970s, designated the 14Tr. Development was halted because of plans to replace trolleybuses by diesel buses, but the 1973 oil crisis led to a re-evaluation and work on the 14Tr resumed.

The Škoda 14Tr trolleybus, at least in the former USSR, became the successor to the Škoda 9Tr (the 10Tr and 13Tr models remained in the projects, 11Tr was released only in single copies, and the Škoda 12Tr was called the trolleybus train of the two Škoda 9Tr trolleybuses).

== Description ==
The 14Tr is a two-axle trolleybus with unibody construction. Its structure consists of mutually welded elements: the frame, side walls, roof and ends. Each component is welded together from steel shapes and castings. The body is covered with a steel skin; the section below the windows is thermally insulated and soundproofed. The interior is surfaces with plastic paneling. Domestic buses have three twin-leaf folding doors on the right side, while export units only have two. Transverse passenger seats are covered in leatherette.

Electrical equipment uses the same thyristor pulse control as the 9Tr trolleybus.

=== Early history ===
One of the first modifications of 14Tr - two 14Tr0 cars (001 and 002) arrived for testing in Kyiv in 1981. One of the cars had a RCSU (rheostat-contactor control system), the second had a TISU (thyristor-pulse control system) which in the late 1970s was an innovation.

The difference from RCSU was that instead of a start-brake resistor, controlled by a rotating shaft with contacts, an electric motor was controlled by a thyristor control unit. Thyristor operation was controlled by a control regulator, so the trolleybus car started driving off more smoothly. The TISU made it possible to recover power - the return part of the electricity consumed by the trolleybus back to the trolleybus power network (see regenerative braking), which reduced operating cost.

Both Škoda 14Tr0 after testing in Kyiv were deployed to Crimea to be used in a long-distance trolleybus route. 001 was used in the Alushta trolleybus depot until it burned down in 1995. 002 was used in Simferopol trolleybus depot and in other depot, but only for training purposes. The prototype was decommissioned and scrapped in 2009.

== Production and operation ==
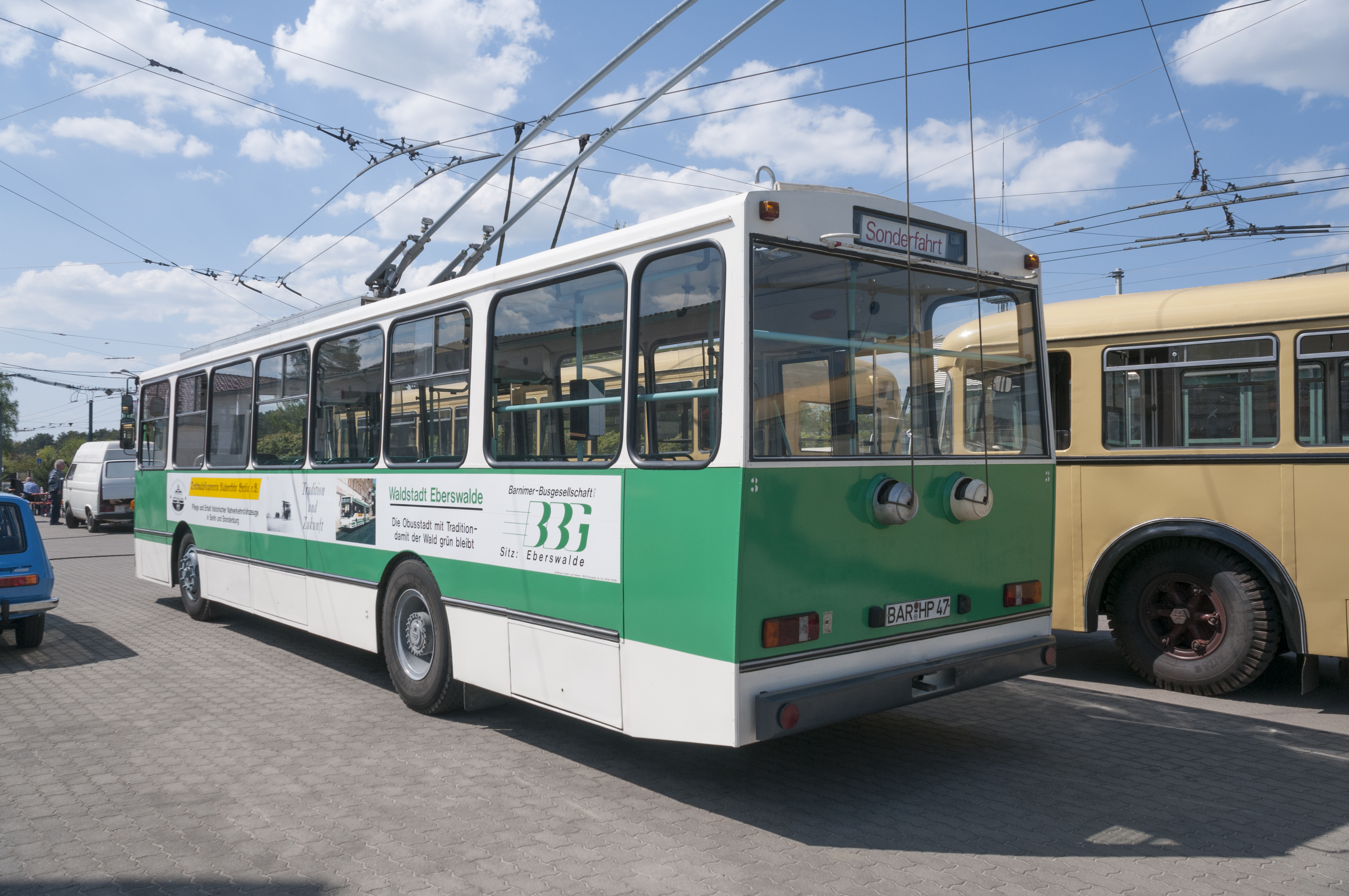
Škoda 14Tr rear in Eberswalde, Germany

Between 1972 and 1998, 3,263 14Tr trolleybuses were built, plus two bodies that were used for the prototype TV-14Tr trolley-train (a total of 3,265 units). The largest number of cars - 354 were sent to Kyiv. The capital favored Soviet-made trolleybuses and there were no large trolleybus systems in Czechoslovakia itself.

=== Electric Transit, Inc. ===
From 1994 to 2004, Electric Transit, Inc. (a joint venture between Škoda and AAI Corporation) assembled 297 14Tr-based trolleybuses for the transit operators in two cities of the United States: Dayton, Ohio and San Francisco, designated 14TrE/E2 ("E" for "E"xport) and 14TrSF ("S"an "F"rancisco), respectively. To meet "Buy America" requirements for federally-subsidized transit vehicle purchases, incomplete "shells" were manufactured at the Škoda plant in the Czech Republic and shipped to an American facility in Hunt Valley, Maryland for initial fitting-out. Final fitting-out was performed at leased facilities in the client cities.

| Country | City | Model | Delivered | Qty | Fleet numbers (as delivered) | Notes and references |
|---|---|---|---|---|---|---|
| Armenia | Gyumri | 14Tr | | 49 | | |
| Armenia | Yerevan | 14Tr | | 123 | | |
| Azerbaijan | Baku | 14Tr | | 208 | | |
| Azerbaijan | Ganja | 14Tr | 1987 | 5 | 211-215 | |
| Bosnia and Herzegovina | Sarajevo | 14Tr | | 79 | | |
| Bulgaria | Sliven | 14Tr | | 15 | | |
| Bulgaria | Sofia | 14Tr | | 52 | | |
| Bulgaria | Varna | 14Tr | 1985-1986, 1999, 2007 | 34 | 002-298, 001, 172 | 001: Delivered from Hradec Králové in 1999; 172: Delivered from Prešov in 2007 |
| China | Beijing | 14Tr | | 1 | | |
| China | Shenyang | 14Tr | | 1 | | |
| Czechoslovakia/Czech Republic | Brno | 14Tr | 1982–1995 | 123 | 3164-3286 | |
| Czechoslovakia/Czech Republic | Hradec Králové | 14Tr | 1983–1990 | 30 | 04-30, 57-59 | |
| Czechoslovakia/Czech Republic | Jihlava | 14Tr | 1983–1991 | 24 | 20-43 | |
| Czechoslovakia/Czech Republic | Mariánské Lázně | 14Tr | 1974–1994 | 20 | 22-23, 33-50 | 22 & 23: 1st and 2nd prototypes; 33: 7th prototype |
| Czechoslovakia/Czech Republic | Opava | 14Tr | 1982–1991 | 24 | 49-72 | |
| Czechoslovakia/Czech Republic | Ostrava | 14Tr | 1984–1992 | 39 | 3123-3141, 3242-3261 | |
| Czechoslovakia/Czech Republic | Pardubice | 14Tr | 1983–1994 | 48 | see summary | |
| Czechoslovakia/Czech Republic | Plzeň | 14Tr | 1982–1991 | 115 | 340; 346-413; 415-460 | |
| Czechoslovakia/Czech Republic | Ostrov (Škoda) | 14Tr | 1980 | 1 | | 4th prototype |
| Czechoslovakia/Czech Republic | Ostrov (Škoda) | TV-14Tr | 1985 | 1 | | constructed from two 14Tr bodies |
| Czechoslovakia/Czech Republic | Teplice | 14Tr | 1982–1993 | 38 | 101/03-05/20-53 | Skoda references indicate 37 units |
| Czechoslovakia/Czech Republic | Ústí nad Labem | 14Tr | 1988 | 5 | 401-405 | |
| Czechoslovakia/Czech Republic | Zlín-Otrokovice | 14Tr | 1982–1991 | 41 | see summary | 26 (1st): 3rd prototype |
| Czechoslovakia/Slovakia | Košice | 14Tr | | 7 | 2001-2007 | |
| Czechoslovakia/Slovakia | Banská Bystrica | 14Tr | 1988–1989 | 7 | 1001-1007 | 1001: 750 V prototype |
| Czechoslovakia/Slovakia | Bratislava (retired) | 14Tr | 1982–1991 | 115 | 61-78, 6219-6315 | |
| Czechoslovakia/Slovakia | Prešov | 14Tr | 1982–1991 | 39 | 45-65, 69-81, 87-91 | Skoda references indicate 36 units |
| Czechoslovakia/Slovakia | Žilina | 14Tr | 1994–1996 | 15 | 211-225 | |
| Estonia | Tallinn | 14Tr | 1982–1989 | 1 | 210-308 | |
| Georgia | Batumi | 14Tr | 1989 | 2 | 100-101 | |
| Georgia | Gori | 14Tr | 1985-? | 3 | 38; 40-41 | |
| Georgia | Kutaisi | 14Tr | | 2 | | |
| Georgia | Ozurgeti | 14Tr | 1989-? | 2 | 24 & ? | |
| Georgia | Poti | 14Tr | | 2 | 018 & ? | |
| Georgia | Rustavi | 14Tr | | 1 | 81 | |
| Georgia | Samtredia | 14Tr | | 2 | | |
| Georgia | Sukhumi | 14Tr | 1987 | 2 | 97-98 | |
| Georgia | Tbilisi | 14Tr | 1983–1990 | 226 | 123-347 | 316 used twice |
| Georgia | Zugdidi | 14Tr | | 1 | 3 | |
| Kazakhstan | Almaty | 14Tr | 1997 | 12 | 1001-10/30/32 | Skoda references indicate 5 units |
| Lithuania | Kaunas | 14Tr | 1982–1998 | 125 | see summary | |
| Lithuania | Vilnius | 14Tr | 1982–1997 | 228 | see summary | |
| Latvia | Riga | 14Tr | 1982–1997 | 254 | see summary | Skoda references indicate 253 units |
| Hungary | Szeged | 14Tr | 1993 | 1 | T-700 | |
| Moldova | Chișinău | 14Tr01 | 1997-2004 | 39 | 2140-2179 | |
| Germany | Eberswalde | 14Tr | 1983 | 3 | 1-3 | |
| Germany | Potsdam | 14Tr | 1983 | 5 | 401-405 | |
| Germany | Weimar | 14Tr | 1982–1983 | 12 | 8000-8011 | |
| Russia | Vologda | 14Tr | | 6 | | |
| Ukraine | Chernivtsi | 14Tr | 1983–1990 | 102 | 217-318 | |
| Ukraine | Donetsk | 14Tr | | 5 | | |
| Ukraine | Ivano-Frankivsk | 14Tr | 1986–1988 | 31 | 126-156 | |
| Ukraine | Kyiv | 14Tr | 1980–1989 | 354 | see summary | |
| Ukraine | Luhansk | 14Tr | 1983–1990 | 55 | 201-245 | 221-230 used twice |
| Ukraine | Lviv | 14Tr | 1984–1990 | 91 | 500-590 | |
| Ukraine | Mariupol | 14Tr | 1983–1990 | 76 | 1401-1476 | |
| Ukraine | Rivne | 14Tr | 1989 | 15 | 101-115 | |
| Ukraine | Simferopol-Alushta-Yalta | 14Tr | 1981–1990 | 160 | see summary | 002/001: 5th & 6th prototypes Skoda references indicate 162 units |
| Ukraine | Ternopil | 14Tr | 1984–1989 | 30 | 086-115 | |
| United States | Dayton, Ohio | 14TrE | 1995–96 | 3 | 9601–9603 | |
| United States | Dayton, Ohio | 14TrE2 | 1998–99 | 54 | 9801–9854 | |
| United States | San Francisco | 14TrSF | 1999; 2001–04 | 240 | 5401–5640 | |
| Uzbekistan | Tashkent | 14Tr | | 145 | | |
| Country | City | Model | Delivered | Qty | Fleet numbers (as delivered) | Notes and references |

Summary

| City | Fleet numbers |
|---|---|
| Kaunas | 215-302, 305-326, 336-351 |
| Kyiv | 101–199, 201-299, 301-398, 401-417, 1000-03/06/08/09, 2001-2034 |
| Pardubice | 301/03/05/06/09/10/13-34/36-49/51/55-57/61/62 |
| Riga | 1-101–1-130/1-132, 1-1100–1-1122/1-1133–1-1199, 2-200–2-233, 2-1001–2-1099 |
| Simferopol - Alusta - Yalta | 001/002, 1021, 1801-25/50-66, 1900-04/50/52-56/59-61, 2000-10/50-52, 2100-06/50-55, 3900, 5850-53, 5950-53, 6000-05/50-57, 6100-06/50-56, 7850-53, 7900-03/50-53, 8000-07/50-53, 8100-05/50-56 |
| Vilnius | 1400-1567, 1585-1599, 1605–2649 Note: The first digit (1 or 2) indicates the allocation; the fleet number is the last three digits. |
| Zlín - Otrokovice | 4/12/18-21/24-26/34/35/37/43/58/68/69/145-168 Note: Number 26 used twice. |

14TrM production started in 1995 and continued until 2002. A planned order for Gatchina, Russia was cancelled when construction of the trolleybus system stopped in 2005.

| Country | In service | Cities |
|---|---|---|
| Azerbaijan | No | Baku (retired with all network) |
| Bulgaria | Yes | Sliven (in passenger service); Ruse, Varna (service vehicles only); Sofia, Pazardzhik, Plovdiv, Stara Zagora, Haskovo (withdrawn) |
| China | No | Beijing; Shanghai |
| Czech Republic | Yes | |
| Hungary | Yes | Szeged |
| Russia | Yes | Vologda; Velikiy Novgorod; Yalta and Simferopol (disputed territories with Ukraine); cancelled order to Gatchina |
| Ukraine | Yes | |
| United States | No | Historic vehicles preserved in Dayton, OH and San Francisco, CA |
| Estonia | No | Tallinn (stored at Jarva-Jaani after withdrawal) |
| Latvia | Yes | Riga |
| Moldova | Yes | |
| Lithuania | Yes | Vilnius |
