= Kiepe Electric =

German manufacturer of electrical traction equipment

Kiepe Electric GmbH
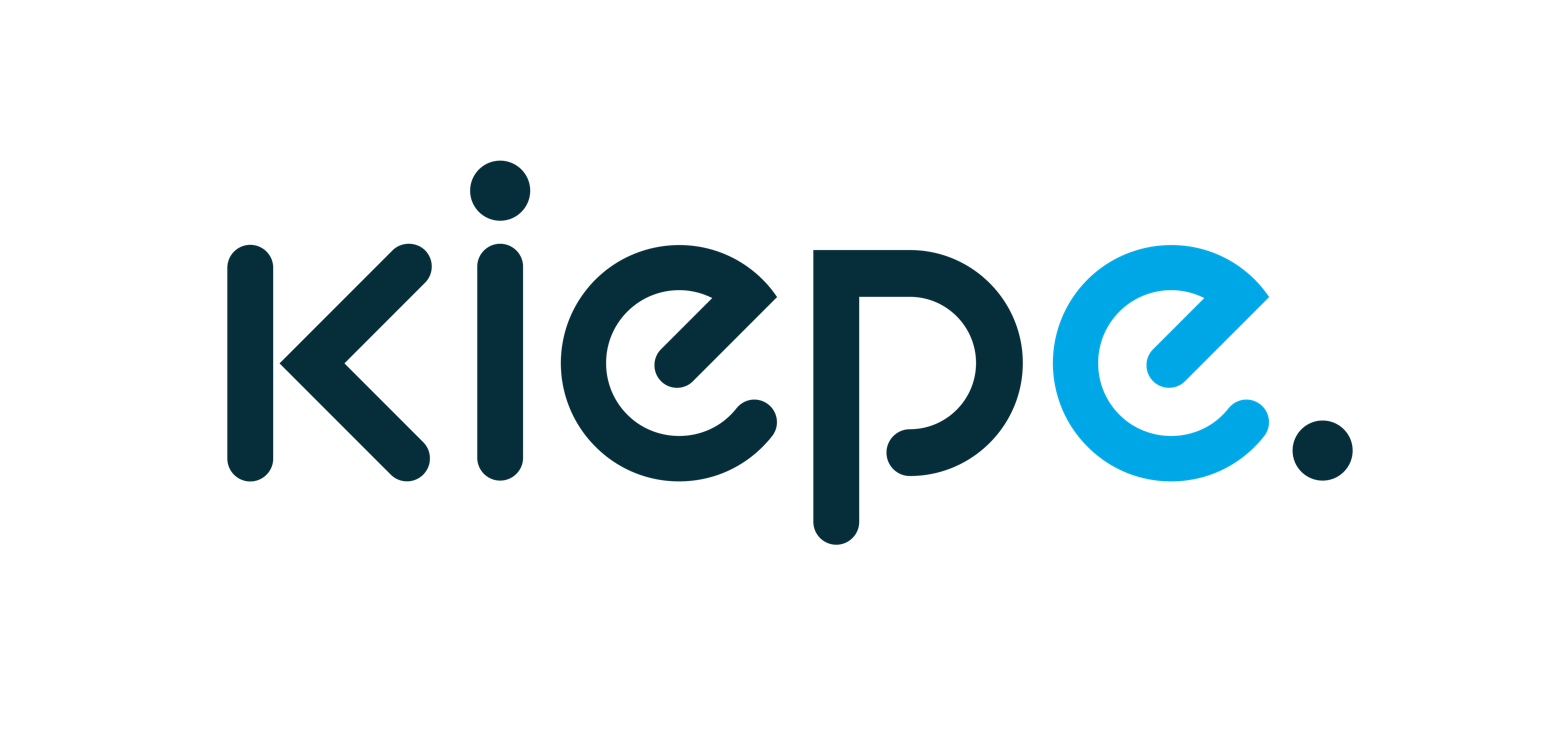
- Type: Gesellschaft mit beschränkter Haftung (German private limited Company)
- Industry: Electrical systems and products for rail and special vehicles
- Founded: 1906
- Founder: Theodor Kiepe
- Headquarters: Düsseldorf, Düsseldorf, Germany, Germany
- Number of locations: 5
- Area served: Europe, USA, Canada, Australia, Middle East
- Key people: Roland Russo (CEO)
- Products: Electrical traction equipment for passenger and freight rail vehicles HVAC equipment for light rail vehicles.
- Revenue: Approx. €130 million p.a.
- Number of employees: 500
- Parent: Heramba Electric (85%); Knorr-Bremse (15%)
- Website: kiepe-group.com

Kiepe Electric, formerly Vossloh Kiepe, is a German manufacturer of electrical traction equipment for trams, trolleybuses other road and rail transport vehicles, as well as air-conditioning and heating systems, and conveyor device components. Founded in 1906, it was known as Kiepe Elektrik until 2003, when it was renamed Vossloh Kiepe, following its acquisition by Vossloh. Vossloh sold the company to Knorr-Bremse in January 2017, and in May 2017 Knorr renamed it Kiepe Electric.

== History ==
In 1906, Theodor Kiepe created an electric arc lamp repair workshop in Düsseldorf. Over the next 40 years the company's product range grew to include electrical switches, then electrical drum controllers and resistors for electric vehicles. By 1951, the product range included electro-pneumatic contactors, and traction motors; in 1952, the company supplied equipment for an order of 700 trolleybuses for Argentina.

Between the 1950s and 1970s Kiepe Elektrik GmbH expanded, with formation of subsidiaries. In 1959 in Wien, Austria Kiepe Elektrik GmbH took over a small manufacturing company forming Kiepe Bahn und Kran Electric Ges.m.b.H. and additionally founded Kiepe Italiana di Elettricità s.p.a., later named Kiepe Electric s.p.a, in Milan, Italy. In 1973, Kiepe Electric GmbH was acquired by ACEC of Belgium. In 1983, the company was acquired from ACEC by Alstom, then by AEG in 1993. During this time Kiepe had become a provider of electrical traction equipment for light rail vehicles.

In 1995, AEG formed Adtranz with ABB by merging their transportation divisions. As this created a duopoly of electric traction equipment manufacturers in Germany, the European Commission ruled that the Kiepe subsidiary had to be sold; in 1996, Schaltbau Group acquired the company. In the early 2000s the company expanded into the North American and Italian markets.

On 14 September 2002, Vossloh acquired Kiepe Elektrik, and in 2003 the company was renamed Vossloh Kiepe.

In mid-2012, UK-based engineering consultancy Transys Projects was acquired. The acquisition was renamed Vossloh Kiepe UK in late 2012. In late 2013, the company, Serbian company Zelvoz and the city of Novi Sad reached an agreement for the establishment of a rail vehicle air conditioning unit factory. In 2014, as part of a restructuring by its parent company, Vossloh Kiepe discontinued its mainline traction equipment activities, Vossloh Kiepe Main Line Technology.

In December 2016, Vossloh announced that it was selling Vossloh Electrical Systems, of which Vossloh Kiepe was a part, to Knorr-Bremse, and the sale was completed in January 2017.

In May 2017, new parent Knorr-Bremse announced the renaming of Vossloh Kiepe as Kiepe Electric, a restoration of its pre-Vossloh name but using English spelling.

== Company structure under Vossloh ==
From 2002 through 2016, the company was part of Vossloh, as of 2009 part of the transportation division (Motive Power & Components) along with Vossloh Locomotives (Kiel, formerly MaK) and Vossloh España (formerly Meinfesa).

As of 2009, the company had five subsidiaries:

- Vossloh Kiepe Main Line Technology GmbH (Germany)
- Vossloh Kiepe Ges.m.b.H. (Austria)
- APS electronic AG (Switzerland)
- Vossloh Kiepe S.r.l. (Italy)
- Vossloh Kiepe Corporation (Canada)

== Products and services ==
The company's primary business is the supply and manufacture of electric equipment for rail vehicles, typically trams or LRVs (light rail vehicles); the company provides electrical traction converters, auxiliary power supplies, air conditioning and heating equipment. Entire trams and LRVs are typically supplied in association with other manufacturers. Also supplied are specialised electric rail vehicles, and equipment for the modernisation of older electrically powered mass transit vehicles.

The company often acts as a component supplier to larger integrated rail vehicle manufactures including Siemens, Alstom and Bombardier.
