= 5 Fulton =

Trolleybus line in San Francisco

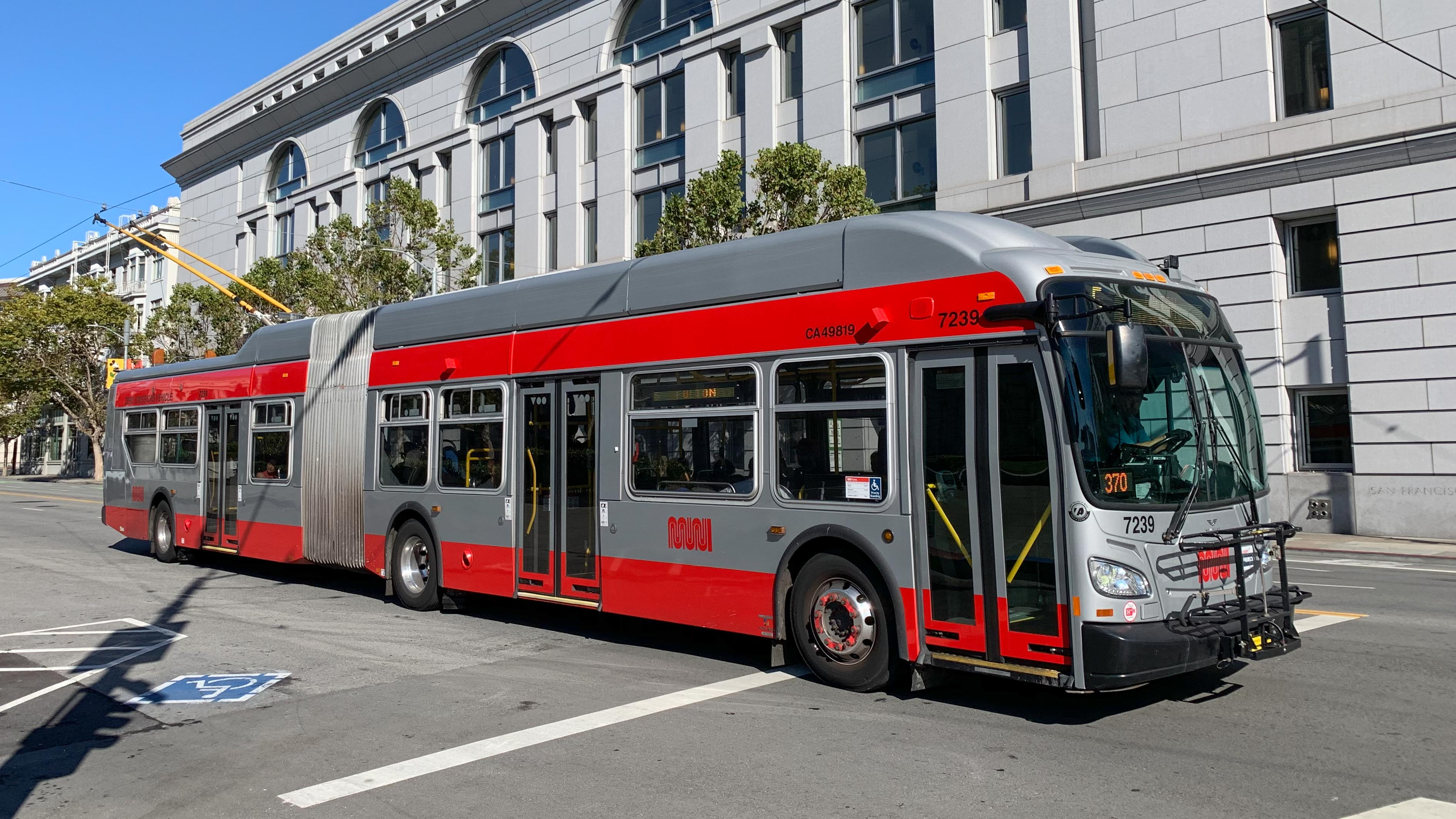
- Articulated trolleybus on McAllister Street, September 2019

Overview
- System: Muni trolleybus network
- Operator: San Francisco Municipal Railway
- Garage: Potrero
- Vehicle: New Flyer XDE40 (5 weekday daytime); New Flyer XT40 (5 other times & 5R); New Flyer XT60 (5 other times & 5R)
- Began service: 1906

Route
- Locale: San Francisco, California
- Start: Salesforce Transit Center; McAllister and Market (owl)
- Via: McAllister Street, Fulton Street
- End: Fulton and 6th Avenue (weekday daytime); Cabrillo and La Playa (other times, 5R)
- Length: 6.9 miles (11.1 km)
- Other routes: 1 California; 3 Jackson; 31 Balboa; 38 Geary
- Daily ridership: 5: 6,800 (June 2024); 5R: 6,800 (June 2024)
- Map: 5 Fulton / 5R Fulton Rapid Map

5 Fulton is a trolleybus line operated by the San Francisco Municipal Railway (Muni). It is one of several routes which connects the Outer Richmond to the Financial District.

== Route description ==
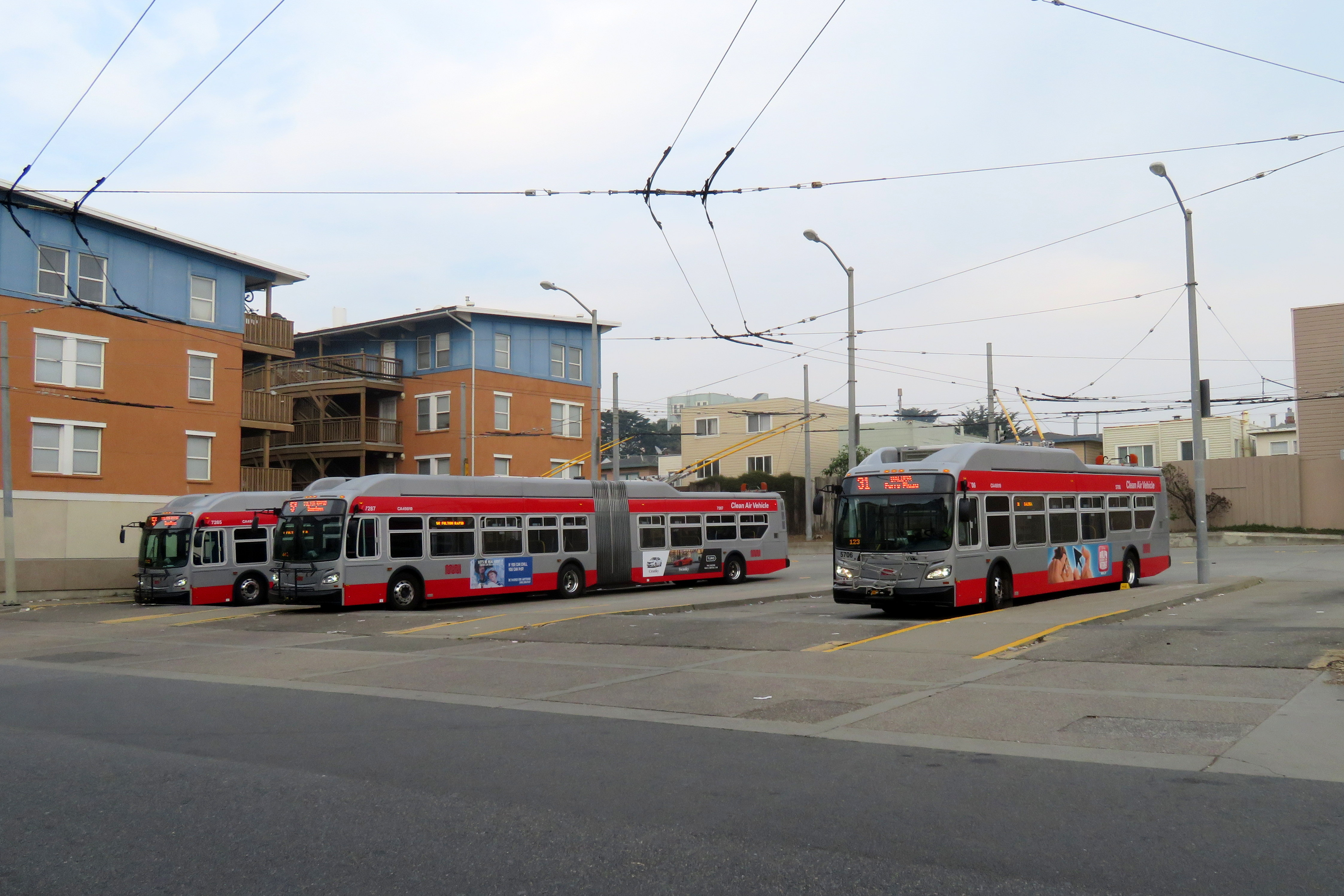
Two 5R and one 31 trolleybuses at the outbound terminal loop at Cabrillo and La Playa, November 2018

The line runs from the Salesforce Transit Center to Cabrillo and La Playa in the Outer Richmond primarily via McAllister and Fulton Streets. Local service during the day midweek is a short turn that terminates outbound at Fulton and 6th Avenue. Much of the route runs adjacent to Golden Gate Park. The 5R Fulton Rapid runs an identical route, but makes limited stops east of 6th Avenue to speed up end to end travel times.

The route operates 24 hours with less frequent short turn Owl service overnight as part of the All Nighter network.

== History ==
The Line was originally established as the McAllister streetcar in 1906, running on Market Street, McAllister, Central and Masonic and Fulton. It acquired the number 5 in 1909, being the fifth of the United Railroads of San Francisco lines to turn off Market Street. Tracks were extended to the ocean at La Playa and Balboa Streets in 1911. Rail service was replaced by buses on June 5, 1948, and trolleybus operation began on July 3 the following year.

The line was renamed to the 5 Fulton in 1976. Service was extended to Cabrillo and La Playa in 1995. The 5L (later 5R) was established in 2013. Muni implemented safety and speed enhancements throughout the corridor between the late 2000s and early 2020s, including bulb-outs, 60-foot (18 m) articulated buses, and bus lanes, among others.

Overnight "Owl" service was extended from Jones Street to 4th Street on June 10, 2023. Due to a budget crisis, as part of the Summer 2025 Muni Service Cuts, weekday daytime 5 service was truncated to Civic Center station on June 21, 2025.
