= Fulton Street =

Fulton Street may refer to:

== Places ==
=== Chicago ===
- Fulton-Randolph Market District
- Fulton River District

=== New York City ===
In New York City, the name is frequently associated with Robert Fulton, who invented a steam boat.

==== Street names ====
- Fulton Street (Brooklyn)
- Fulton Street (Manhattan)

==== New York City Subway ====
- Fulton Center (formerly Fulton Street Transit Center)
- Fulton Street station (BMT Fifth Avenue Line); a station on the demolished section of the BMT Fifth Avenue Line in Brooklyn
- Fulton Street station (IND Crosstown Line); in Brooklyn serving the G train
- Fulton Street station (IRT Third Avenue Line); a station on the demolished section of the IRT Third Avenue Line in Manhattan
- Fulton Street station (New York City Subway), a station complex in Manhattan serving the 2, 3, 4, 5, A, C, J, and Z trains; consisting of:
  - Fulton Street (BMT Nassau Street Line); serving the J and Z trains
  - Fulton Street (IND Eighth Avenue Line); serving the A and C trains
  - Fulton Street (IRT Broadway – Seventh Avenue Line); serving the 2 and 3 trains
  - Fulton Street (IRT Lexington Avenue Line); serving the 4 and 5 trains
- IND Eighth Avenue Line, running under Fulton Street in Manhattan
- IND Fulton Street Line, running under Fulton Street in Brooklyn

=== San Francisco ===
- Fulton Street (San Francisco)

== Other uses ==
- 2400 Fulton Street, a 1987 Jefferson Airplane compilation album
- Fulton Street I and Fulton Street II, songs from La Dispute's 2019 album Panorama

== See also ==
- Fulton Street Line (disambiguation)
