= Trolleybuses in San Francisco =

Public transport system in California, US

San Francisco trolleybus system
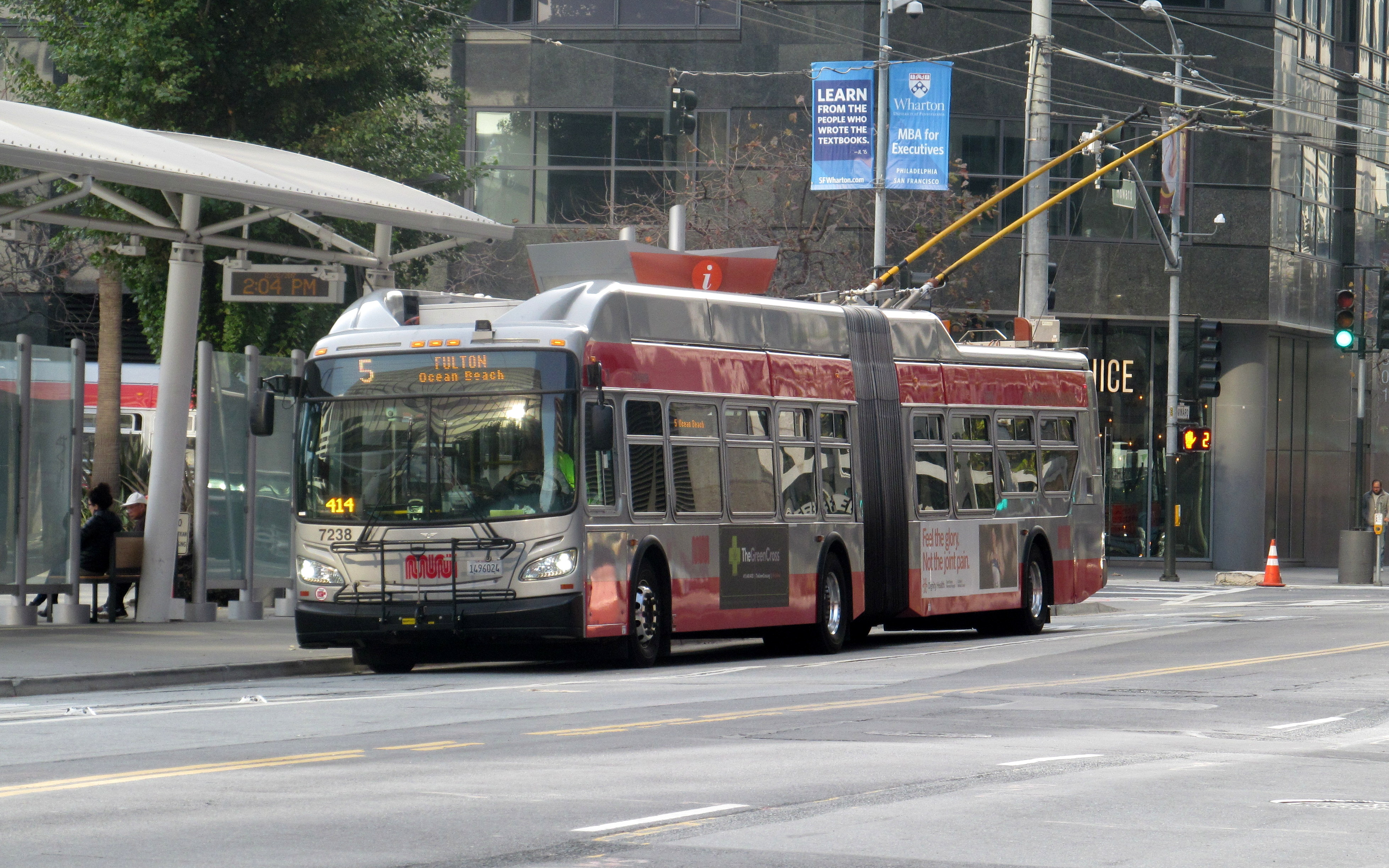
- An XT60 trolleybus on route 5-Fulton in December 2017

Operation
- Locale: San Francisco, California, United States
- Open: October 6, 1935
- Routes: 15
- Operators: Market Street Railway (1935–1944); San Francisco Municipal Railway (1941–present)

Infrastructure
- Electrification: Parallel overhead lines, 600 V DC
- Depots: Potrero; Presidio
- Stock: 278 vehicles (as of 2023, excluding historic vehicles)

Statistics
- Annual ridership: 48,103,800 (2025)
- Website: sfmta.com

The San Francisco trolleybus system forms part of the public transportation network serving San Francisco, in the state of California, United States. Opened on October 6, 1935, it presently comprises 15 lines and is operated by the San Francisco Municipal Railway, commonly known as Muni (or the Muni), with around 300 trolleybuses. In San Francisco, these vehicles are also known as "trolley coaches", a term that was the most common name for trolleybuses in the United States in the middle decades of the 20th century. In 2025, the system had a ridership of 48,103,800, or about 102,300 per weekday as of the second quarter of 2026.

The Muni trolleybus system is complementary to the city-owned Muni bus services, Muni Metro and cable car system and the rail-bound regional Caltrain and Bay Area Rapid Transit systems. In addition, it shares some of its overhead wires with the F Market & Wharves streetcar line.

One of only four such systems currently operating in the U.S., the Muni trolleybus system is the second-largest such system in the Western Hemisphere, after that of Mexico City. The system includes the single steepest known grade on any existing trolleybus line in the world (22.8% in the block of Noe Street between Cesar Chavez Street and 26th Street on route 24 Divisadero), and several other sections of Muni trolleybus routes are among the world's steepest.

== History ==
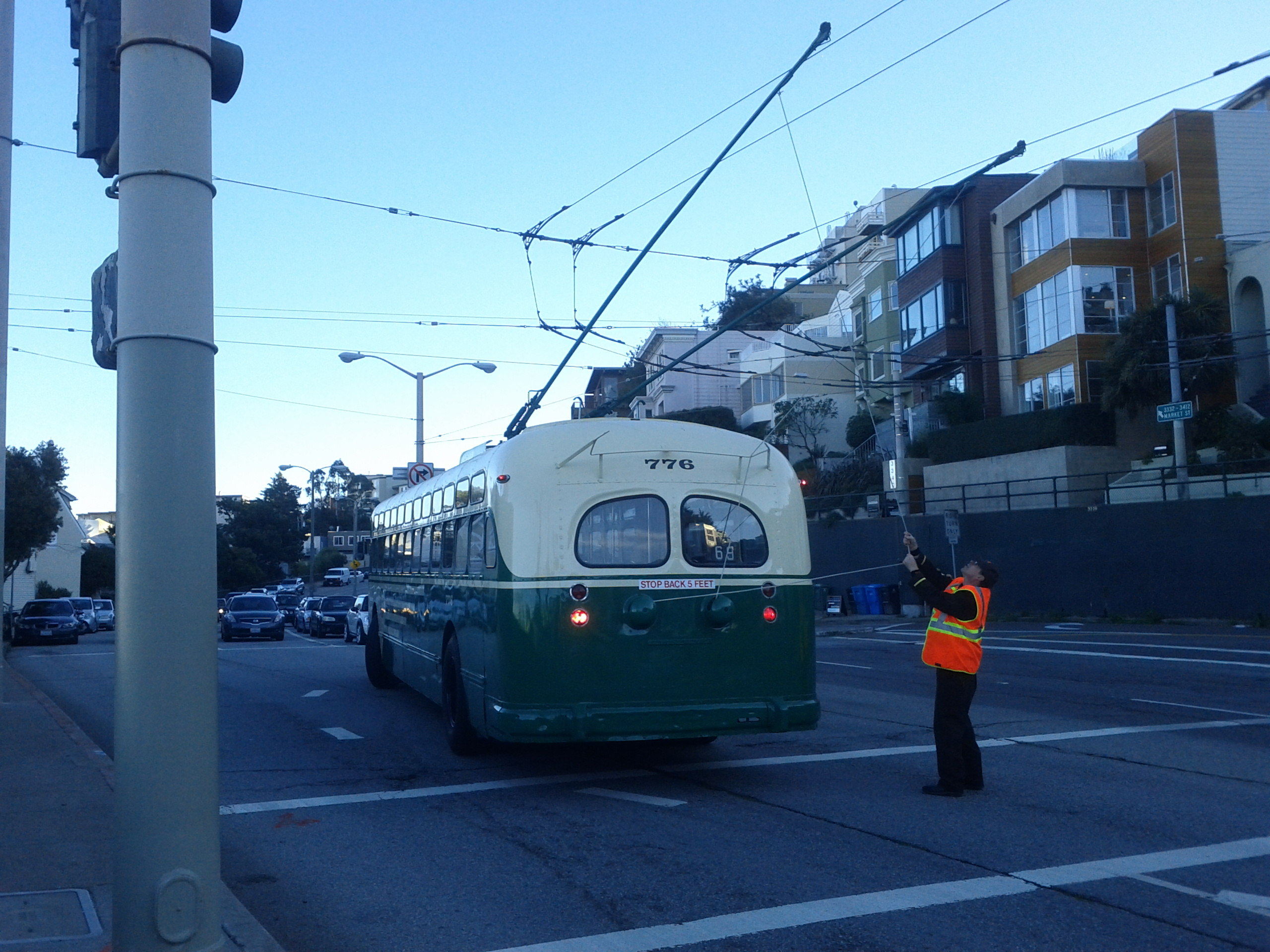
Preserved Muni trolleybus 776 photographed in 2012 at Market and Clayton on the original No. 33 trolleybus route established by Market Street Railway in 1935

Long a hub of streetcar development, San Francisco already had much of the overhead wire infrastructure necessary to deploy trolleybus service on existing city streets. A city ordinance requiring streetcars to use two operators also served to encourage trolleybus deployment. In April 1934, Col. John H. Skeggs of the State Highway Department urged the conversion of the No. 33 Line streetcar to "trackless trolley", as some of the tracks would have to be taken up for the construction of the Bay Bridge. By early August of that year, the Market Street Railway Company (MSRy), successor to the URR, applied to the State Railroad Commission to operate the first trackless trolley system in California; permission was granted by August 30, and the first trolleybus service started on October 6, 1935, using 9 coaches built by Brill. The No. 33 Line had been originally established in 1892 by the San Francisco & San Mateo Railway Company as the 18th and Park or 18th Street Branch route. That route initially ran along 18th from Guerrero to Douglass before being extended to Frederick and Ashbury including a sharp hairpin turn on the lower slopes of Twin Peaks at Market and Clayton by May 1894. At the time of conversion, the No. 33 streetcar operated between Third & Harrison (Downtown) and Waller & Stanyan (Golden Gate Park), a round trip of 10.2 miles (16.4 km). The current 33 Ashbury/18th Street trolleybus route still runs on a portion of that route. After riding the trackless trolley, the editor of the San Bernardino Sun published a rumor that all streetcar service would eventually be replaced with trolleybuses.

On September 7, 1941, Muni introduced its first trolleybus line to compete with MSRy, the R-Howard line, using vehicles built by the St. Louis Car Company. R-Howard was built on the original route of the sparsely ridden No. 35 streetcar line; MSRy's franchise to operate the No. 35 had expired at the end of the 1930s. The R-Howard line was introduced specifically so that Muni could undercut MSRy's prices on its parallel routes on Mission Street. The 35-Howard line originally ran from the Ferry Building along Howard, South Van Ness, and 24th to that street's intersection with Rhode Island. The routing for R-Howard followed a similar path from Howard & Beale along Howard and South Van Ness to South Van Ness & Army (now named Cesar Chavez). Although the overhead wires are still present along Howard, they are not used in revenue service. The present-day 14 Mission trolleybus route runs along Mission, parallel to the original R-Howard route on Howard. By 1944, the MSRy was in financial difficulties. Thus, at 5 am on September 29, 1944, Muni acquired its commercial competitor. Along with the routes and equipment, Muni adopted its competitor's more expensive seven-cent fare ($1.53 adjusted for inflation). At the time, the R-Howard line used 9 trolleybuses over a 6.8 miles (10.9 km) route (round-trip).

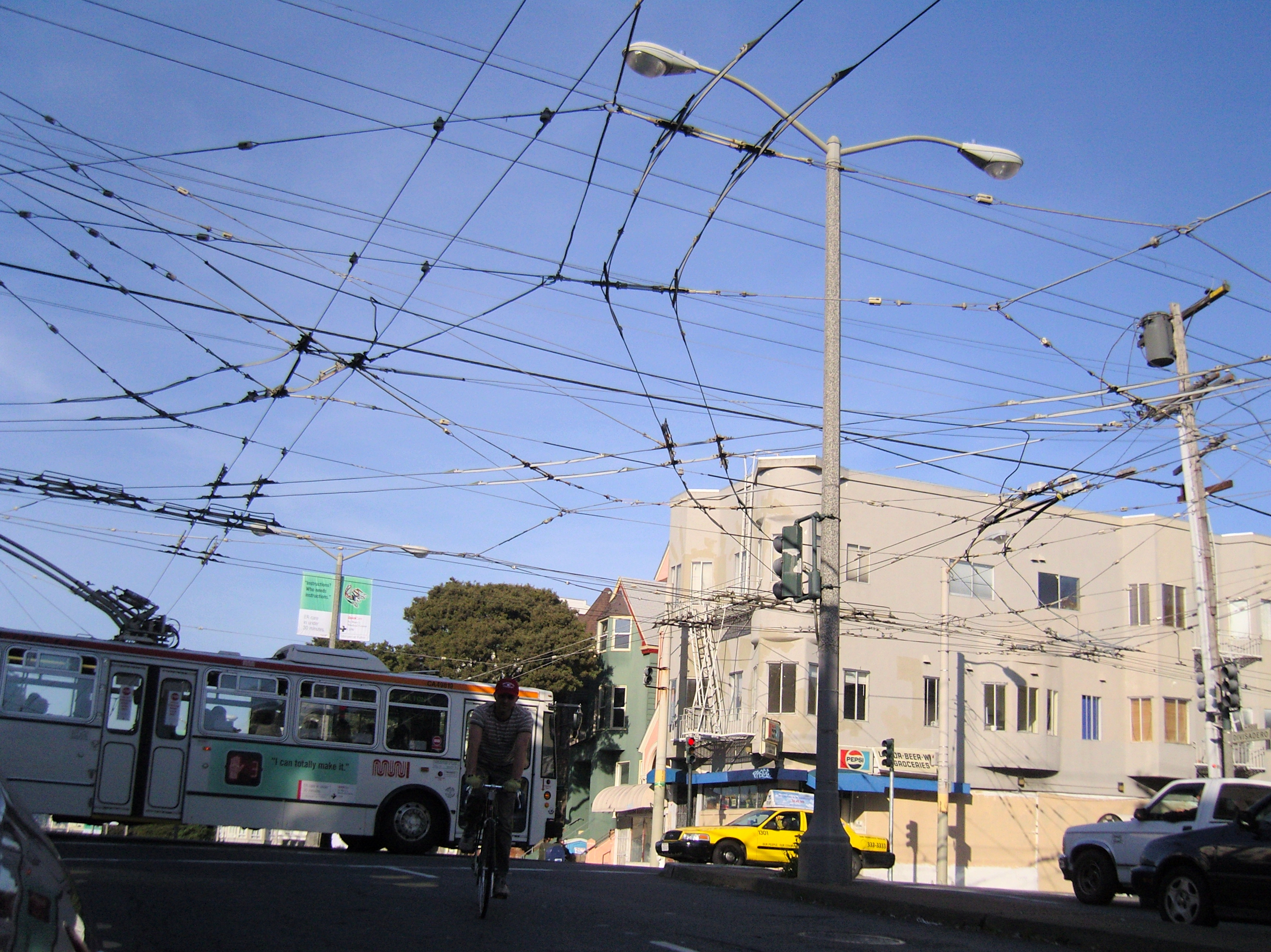
Muni trolleybus wires at McAllister & Divisadero Streets

The city attorney's office had ruled that using trolleybuses instead of streetcars was not abandonment of service; this opinion would eventually be overturned in 1959, but not before Muni followed national trends in replacing most of its streetcar rail lines with trolleybus service in the 1940s and 1950s. The E-Union line was the first to be replaced with trolleybus service, which combined the route with R-Howard as the E-Union-Howard. Trolleybus operation on the new E line commenced on June 9, 1947; it was redesignated in 1949 and survives as the 41 Union (during peak hours only; suspended since 2020). 8-Market was converted to trolleybus service in 1948. The deployment of new "trackless trolleys" was greatly expanded on July 3, 1949, when Muni rolled out trolleybus service to replace five former MSRy lines, including the 21-Hayes and 5-McAllister streetcar lines. In total, fourteen streetcar lines were converted to trolleybus service by 1951. With the closure of the B-Geary line on December 29, 1956, only five lines with dedicated rights-of-way (including those running through the Twin Peaks and Sunset tunnels) continued as rail-based streetcar lines. Those five lines ran 1940s-era PCC streetcars through the 1970s and were subsequently converted to the Muni Metro light rail system using Boeing-Vertol SLRVs.

In 1968, the city was on the verge of eliminating its trolleybus fleet and converting its bus network to diesel. In response, the San Francisco Public Utilities Commission resolved to "optimize the use of the use of the City’s electrical facilities and electrical transit equipment thereby placing emphasis on electric-powered transit" to combat air pollution and noise pollution.

In 2019, the California Air Resources Board set a mandate known as the Innovative Clean Transit rule, which will require all public transit operators in the state to use zero-emissions buses, to eliminate greenhouse gas emissions and combat climate change. Analysis has found that maintenance and expansion of the trolleybus network in San Francisco could be the fastest and cheapest way for Muni to comply with the mandate and decarbonize its fleet.

=== Grade ===
While many municipalities further converted their trolleybus systems to diesel buses during the middle of the 20th century, San Francisco maintained trolleybuses due to their ability to climb the city's notably steep grades and because electricity was available at extremely low cost from the city-owned O'Shaughnessy Dam. Muni has stated that it is impossible for some lines to be replaced by regular buses. The system includes the single steepest known grade on any existing trolleybus line in the world, specifically 22.8% in the block of Noe Street between Cesar Chavez Street and 26th Street on route 24 Divisadero, and several other sections of Muni trolleybus routes are among the world's steepest.

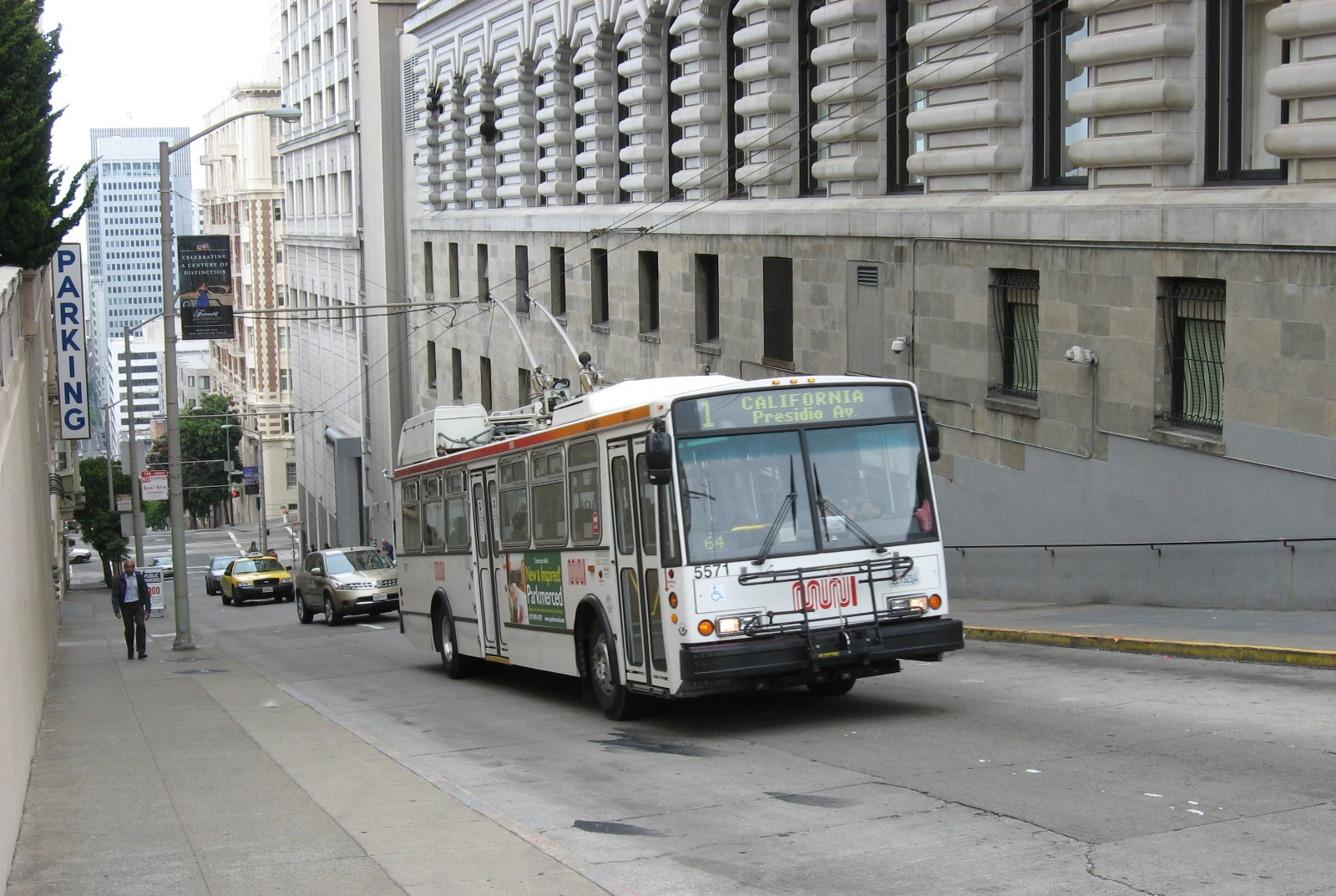
ETI 14TrSF trolleybus climbs Nob Hill along Sacramento near Powell in 2007, a 17% grade.

On December 16, 1981, the 55-Sacramento line was converted from diesel motor coach service to trolleybus specifically to power the westward climb on Sacramento Street up Nob Hill, and just six weeks later, on January 27, 1982, the 1 California route was revised to include the newly electrified sections of route 55, with the latter then discontinued. Before dieselization, the line on Sacramento had been operated using cable cars. At the time, Muni was also facing a severe shortage of available diesel motor coaches due to age and deferred maintenance, which would lead to the conversion of the 45-Greenwich diesel bus service to the 45-Union-Van Ness trolleybus in 1982 as a temporary experiment later made permanent. A year after being lengthened, route 24 Divisadero was converted to trolleybus operation in 1983. In 1993, the last major electric conversion took place when route 31 Balboa was partially converted to trolleybus service. Full implementation was delayed until 1994, when accessible Flyer E60 trolleybuses became available. Coming full circle, at the end of 1995 the 8-Market trolleybus line was replaced by the F Market & Wharves streetcar line using refurbished PCCs. The overwhelming popularity of the new F line allowed Muni to reduce the frequency of and then discontinue the 8-Market, though the overhead wires remain in place.

Approximately 1/3 of the daily riders on Muni are carried on trolleybuses; in 2010, that was 227,000 passenger boardings per weekday.

== Lines ==
Trolleybuses operate on the following Muni routes:

An unofficial map of the current San Francisco Municipal Railway (Muni) trolleybus network

An unofficial map of the current San Francisco Municipal Railway (Muni) trolleybus owl network

Line	Regular route	Division	Model used	Notes
1 California	Drumm & Clay Sacramento/Clay; California; 32nd Av; 33rd Av & Geary	Presidio	XT40	Operates a shortened route between Drumm & Clay and Presidio Av & California to supplement the longer route from 7 am to 7 pm daily.
2 Sutter	Ferry Plaza Market; Sutter/Post; Presidio Av; California & Presidio Av	Presidio	XT40	Formerly a motorbus route (signed as 2 Clement), while short turns on weekdays only were operated by trolleybuses. Trolleybuses have operated this route full-time since 2022.
3 Jackson (suspended)	Market & Sansome Sutter/Post; Fillmore; Jackson; Presidio Av; California & Presidio Av	Presidio (formerly)	XT40 (formerly)	Formerly the lowest ridership trolleybus route. Indefinitely suspended since 2020 due to the COVID-19 pandemic.
5 Fulton (evenings/weekends)	SF Transit Center Market; McAllister; Fulton; Ocean Beach	Potrero	XT60	Operates with motorbuses on a shortened route on weekdays from 7:30 am-7:30 pm. Operated with trolleybuses on weekends and outside of motorbus hours on weekdays, including 24-hour Owl services (on a shortened route).
5^{R} Fulton Rapid (weekday daytimes)	SF Transit Center Market; McAllister; Fulton; Ocean Beach	Potrero	XT60	Only operates on weekdays 7:30 am-7:30 pm.
6 Hayes/Parnassus	Civic Center Market; Hayes/Grove; Masonic; Frederick; Parnassus; 9th Av; 14th Av & Quintara	Presidio	XT40	Formerly the 6 Haight/Parnassus, operated via Haight Street instead of Hayes/Grove Streets prior to 2025.
14 Mission	Ferry Plaza Mission; Daly City	Potrero	XT60	Operates 24-hour Owl services (on full route).
21 Hayes (suspended)	Civic Center Market; Hayes/Grove; Stanyan/Shrader; Fulton & Shrader	Presidio (formerly)	XT40 (formerly)	Discontinued since 2025 due to budget deficit. Replaced with rerouted and renamed 6 Hayes/Parnassus.
22 Fillmore	Bay St & Fillmore Fillmore; Church; 16th St; 3rd St; UCSF Mission Bay	Potrero	XT40	Rerouted from Dogpatch to Mission Bay in 2021. Operates 24-hour Owl services (on full route).
24 Divisadero	Jackson & Fillmore Jackson; Divisadero; Castro; Noe; 30th St; Cortland; Bayshore; Industrial; Palou; 3rd St & Palou	Presidio	XT40	Operates 24-hour Owl services (on a shortened route).
30 Stockton	Caltrain Depot 3rd St/4th St; Kearny/Stockton; Columbus; North Point; Chestnut; Broderick/Divisadero; Marina; Mason; The Presidio	Potrero	XT60	Does not serve the Presidio after 8 pm daily and before 6:30 am on weekends. Operates a shortened route (signed as 30^{S} Stockton) between 4th St & Mission and Van Ness & North Point to supplement the longer route from 8 am to 5 pm daily.
31 Balboa	Cyril Magnin & Market Turk/Eddy; Balboa; Cabrillo; Ocean Beach	Presidio	XT40	Truncated to Cyril Magnin & Market in 2025 due to budget deficit.
33 Ashbury/18th Street	Cherry & Sacramento California; Arguello; Fulton; Stanyan; Haight; Ashbury; Clayton; 18th St; Mission; 16th St; Potrero; 25th St & Potrero	Presidio	XT40	The route is a direct descendant of the first trolleybus route in San Francisco.
41 Union (suspended)	Howard & Main Main/Beale; Drumm/Davis; Sacramento/Clay; Sansome/Montgomery; Columbus; Union; Baker/Lyon; Lyon & Greenwich	Presidio (formerly)	XT40 (formerly)	From 1988 to 2020, the route was the only rush-hour-only trolleybus route. Indefinitely suspended since 2020 due to the COVID-19 pandemic.
45 Union/Stockton	Caltrain Depot 3rd St/4th St; Kearny/Stockton; Union; Baker/Lyon; Lyon & Greenwich	Presidio	XT40	
49 Van Ness/Mission	North Point & Van Ness Van Ness; South Van Ness; Mission; Ocean; City College	Potrero	XT60	Motorized since 2016, trolleybuses have only operated on this route since the Van Ness BRT opened in 2022, however several trips continue to be operated by articulated motorbuses as of 2025.

== Fleet ==
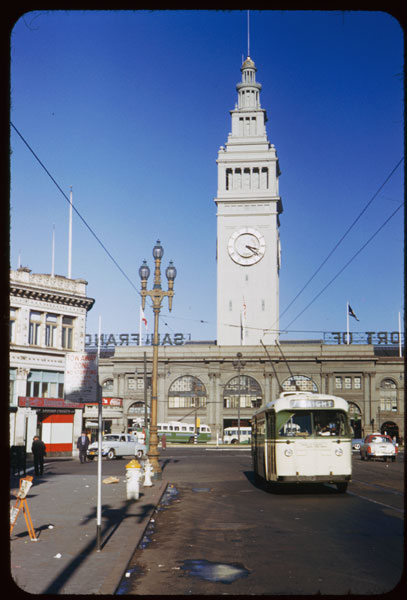
Muni Marmon-Herrington trolleybus in front of the Ferry Building on Market (1953)

Since the start of service in 1935 (on the Market Street Railway system), the San Francisco trolleybus system fleet has included vehicles built by many different manufacturers, including the J. G. Brill Company, the St. Louis Car Company, Marmon-Herrington, Twin Coach, Flyer Industries (now New Flyer), and Electric Transit.

=== Early fleet (Brill, St. Louis) ===
Market Street Railway was the first transit organization in San Francisco to run trackless trolleys, using nine coaches built by Brill in 1935 for the 33 line, numbered 51–59. Each Brill was 33 ft (10 m) long and seated 37; approximately half used traction motors from General Electric (GE) and the other half used Westinghouse (WH) motors. Shortly after Muni assumed MSRy's operations in 1944, the Brill coaches were replaced by newer trolleybuses built for Muni and transferred to supplemental rush hour service by 1946. All of the Brill coaches were scrapped by 1954.

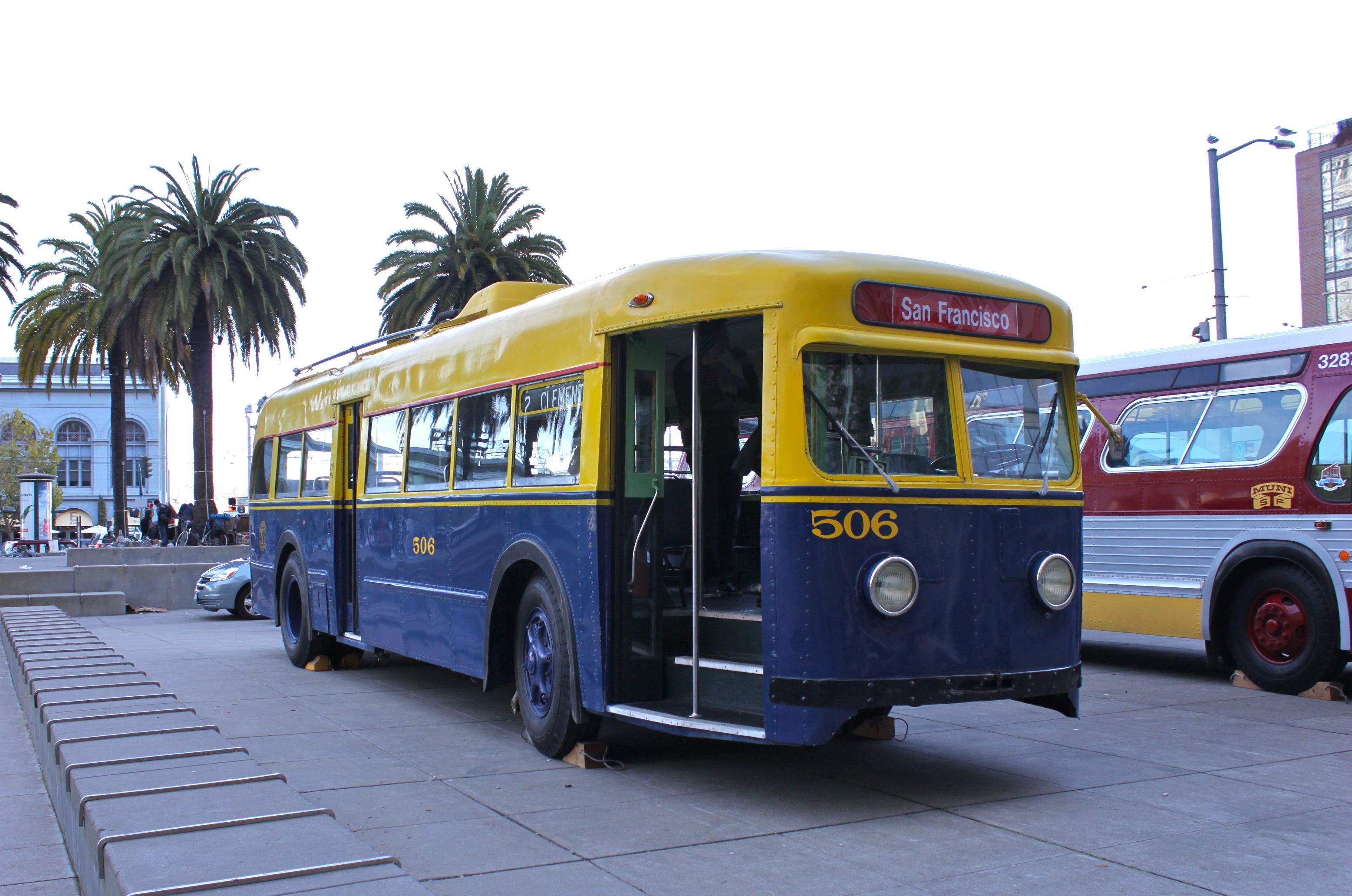
The oldest remaining trolleybus in San Francisco is the St. Louis-built No. 506, photographed in 2012.

Muni commissioned its first trolleybuses from the St. Louis Car Company in 1939, and they were built in that year but were not placed into service until 1941. These were 40-seat coaches. Like the earlier Brills built for MSRy, the first set of nine St. Louis coaches used motors from GE and Westinghouse. Numbered 501–509, they went into service on the R-Howard Line in 1941. A second order in 1947 for 16 slightly larger coaches completed the first fleet of 25 coaches for Muni.

=== Replacing streetcars (Marmon, Twin Coach, St. Louis) ===
The Muni trackless trolley fleet was expanded starting in 1947 as streetcar service was being replaced. Muni primarily purchased trolleybuses from Marmon-Harrington in three different sizes: the "Baby Marmons" in 1947 (Model TC40, numbered 526–549, 40 seats), followed by "Medium Marmons" in 1949 (Model TC44, numbered 550–569 and 660–739, 44 seats), and finally "Large Marmons" in 1950 (Model TC48, numbered 740–849, 48 seats).The Baby Marmons were relegated to supplemental service by 1954 and retired by 1961; most were scrapped, with few exceptions, by 1969.

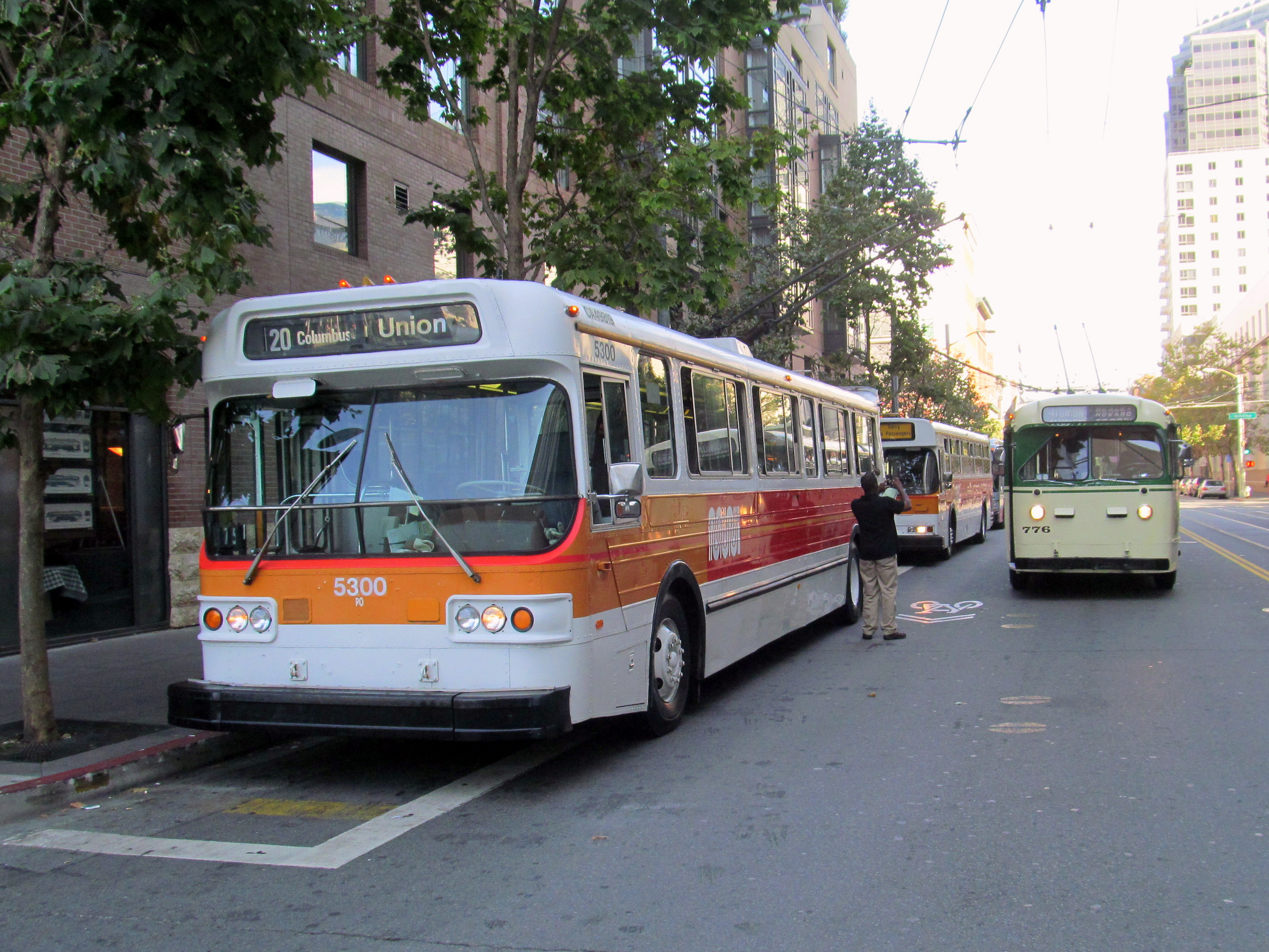
Flyer no. 5300 and its predecessor, Marmon-built no. 776, photographed during Heritage Weekend in 2017

In addition, Muni ordered 90 trolleybuses from Twin Coach comparable to the Medium Marmons in 1949 (Model 44TTW, numbered 570–659, 44 seats). The final expansion of the trolleybus fleet in the 1950s was accomplished by purchasing 40 48-seat coaches from the St. Louis Car Company in the early 1950s. The mixed fleet of Medium and Large Marmon, Twin Coach, and St. Louis trolleybuses would serve Muni throughout the 1960s and well into the 1970s; by the time Muni was ready to replace its trolleybuses, however, no American manufacturer was willing to build a new trolleybus. Muni turned to Flyer Industries, a Canadian manufacturer who was still building trolleybuses for their domestic market.

=== Flyer and New Flyer ===
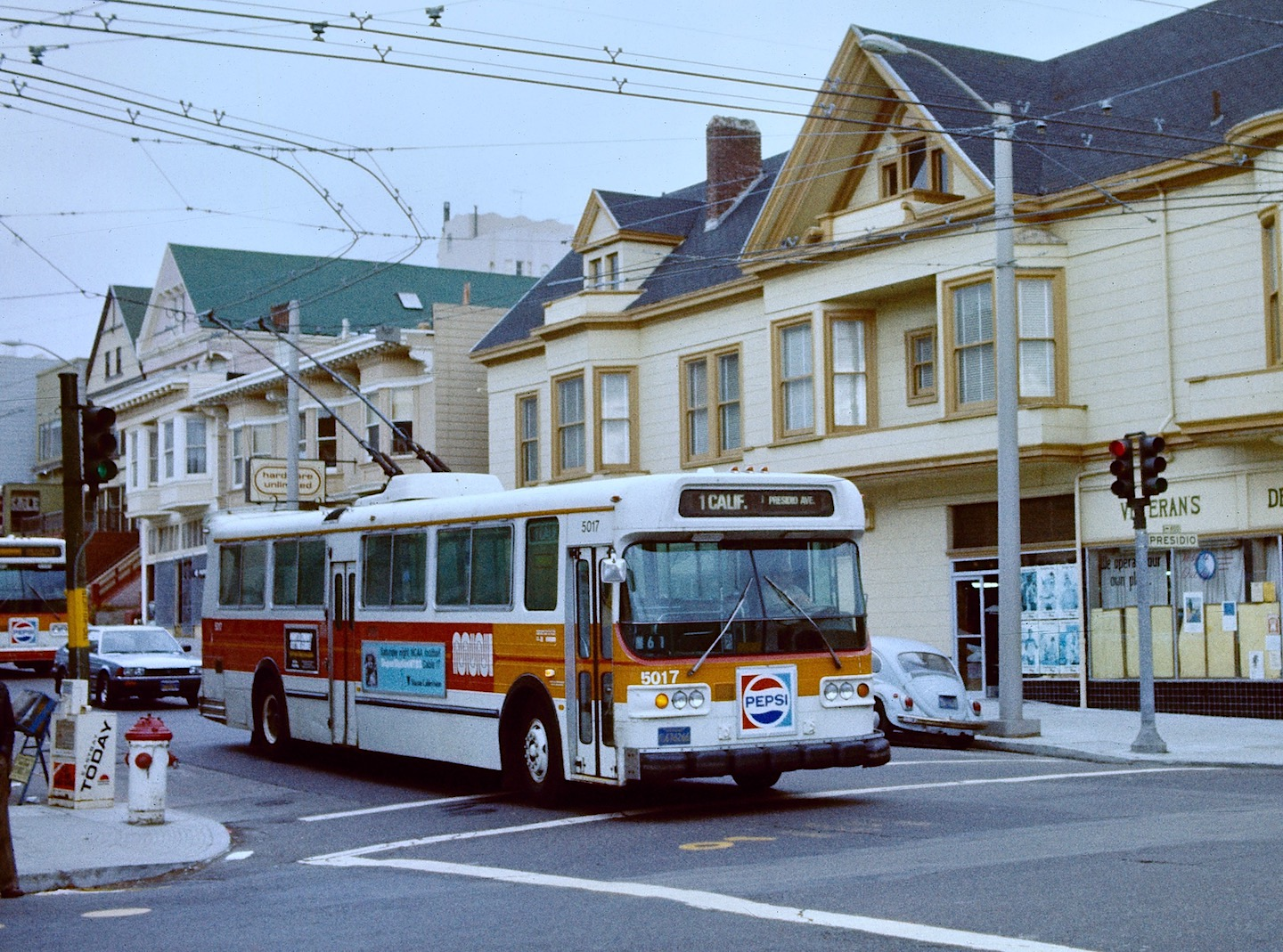
A Flyer E800 trolleybus on route 1 in 1982

By 1977, with the delivery of more than 300 Flyer E800 trolleybuses, Muni was able to retire its existing fleet of trolleybuses; the newest of those (outside the Flyers) was by then more than 25 years old. A significant portion of the legacy Marmon/St. Louis fleet was sold to Mexico City.

As the fleet of Flyer trolleybuses aged, reliability declined. In 1991, the fleet of Flyer E800 trolleybuses traveled a mean distance of 2,000 mi (3,200 km) between failures (MDBF). By 1995, the MDBF had fallen to just 600 mi (970 km), and each breakdown was taking an average of 4 1/4 days to fix, often compounded by the unavailability of parts for the E800s, which were nearly 20 years old at that point. In addition, a number of incidents where poles had detached from the wires and subsequently struck pedestrians and vehicles gained publicity at the time.

In 1993, Muni procured a fleet of 60 New Flyer E60s, that agency's first use of articulated trolleybuses. Muni was the only customer for the E60 trolleybus variant of the New Flyer Galaxy; a prototype was built in 1992 and numbered 7000 for evaluation before the larger purchase was completed. The New Flyer E60 fleet subsequently were blamed for increasing the fleet accident rate. By 1996, the fleet average was 12.5 accidents per 100,000 mi (160,000 km) traveled; in comparison, the E60 rate was 26 accidents over the same distance. They gained a reputation as the most difficult buses in drive system-wide, and were often driven by the least experienced drivers, as their increased capacity meant they were used on the busiest lines, which were relegated to drivers with the least seniority.

In 2001, the first known trolleybus fire occurred aboard No. 5204, a Flyer E800 that was over 20 years old. At that point, procurement of the successor ETI 14TrSF replacement vehicles was already underway.

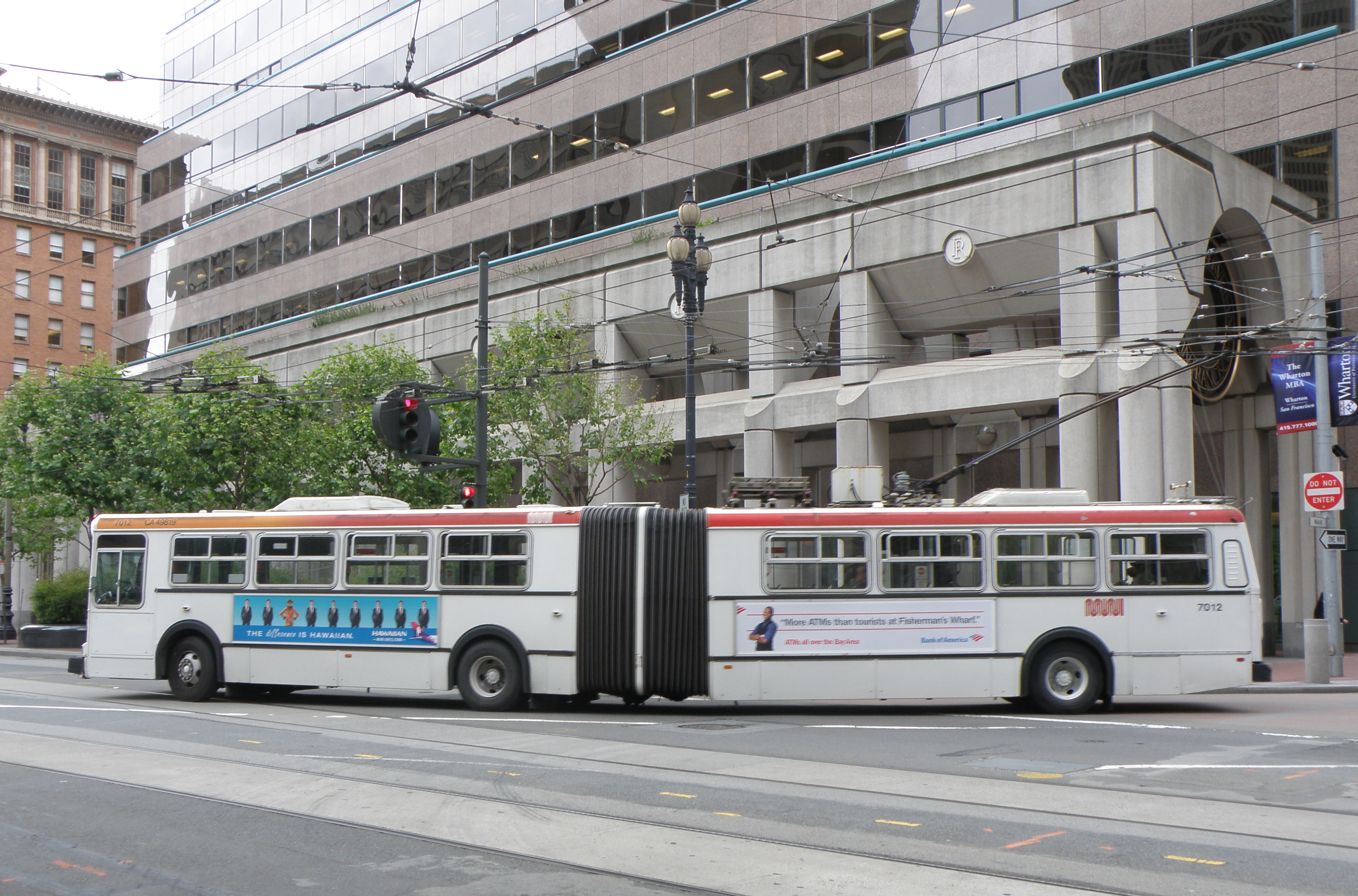
Flyer E60 at Market & Main (2011)

The reliability of the New Flyer E60s suffered as they aged, achieving a MDBF of approximately 500 miles (800 km) in January 2011 and January 2012. 20 of the 60 originally ordered had been retired by 2010. At that time, the New Flyer E60 fleet was approaching 20 years old, and buses were breaking down, on average, once every five days. 12 New Flyer E60s were retired in early 2013, and the remaining 28 E60s were retired in early January 2015.

=== Electric Transit, Inc. ===
The Electric Transit, Inc. (ETI) trolleybuses were delivered between 2001 and 2003, and came in two different models: 240 40-foot units (model 14TrSF) and 33 articulated 60-foot units (model 15TrSF), specially derived from the Škoda 14Tr and 15Tr, respectively, for use on the Muni system. The suffix SF in the two ETI model numbers stands for San Francisco. The total number of rigid (40-foot) trolleybuses was expanded to 240 with the new ETI 14TrSFs because of anticipated demand resulting from plans in the early 2000s to expand the trolleybus network. However, the expansion projects were not pursued after the Transit Effectiveness Project determined that minor changes to improve efficiency were all that were needed.

During testing, the new ETI trolleybuses were compared to a "luxury car" by one driver, and touted features included a new pneumatic system to raise and lower trolley poles and an on-board battery to allow off-wire operation for up to 2 1/2 mi (4.0 km). However, the new ETI trolleybuses proved to be overweight during testing.

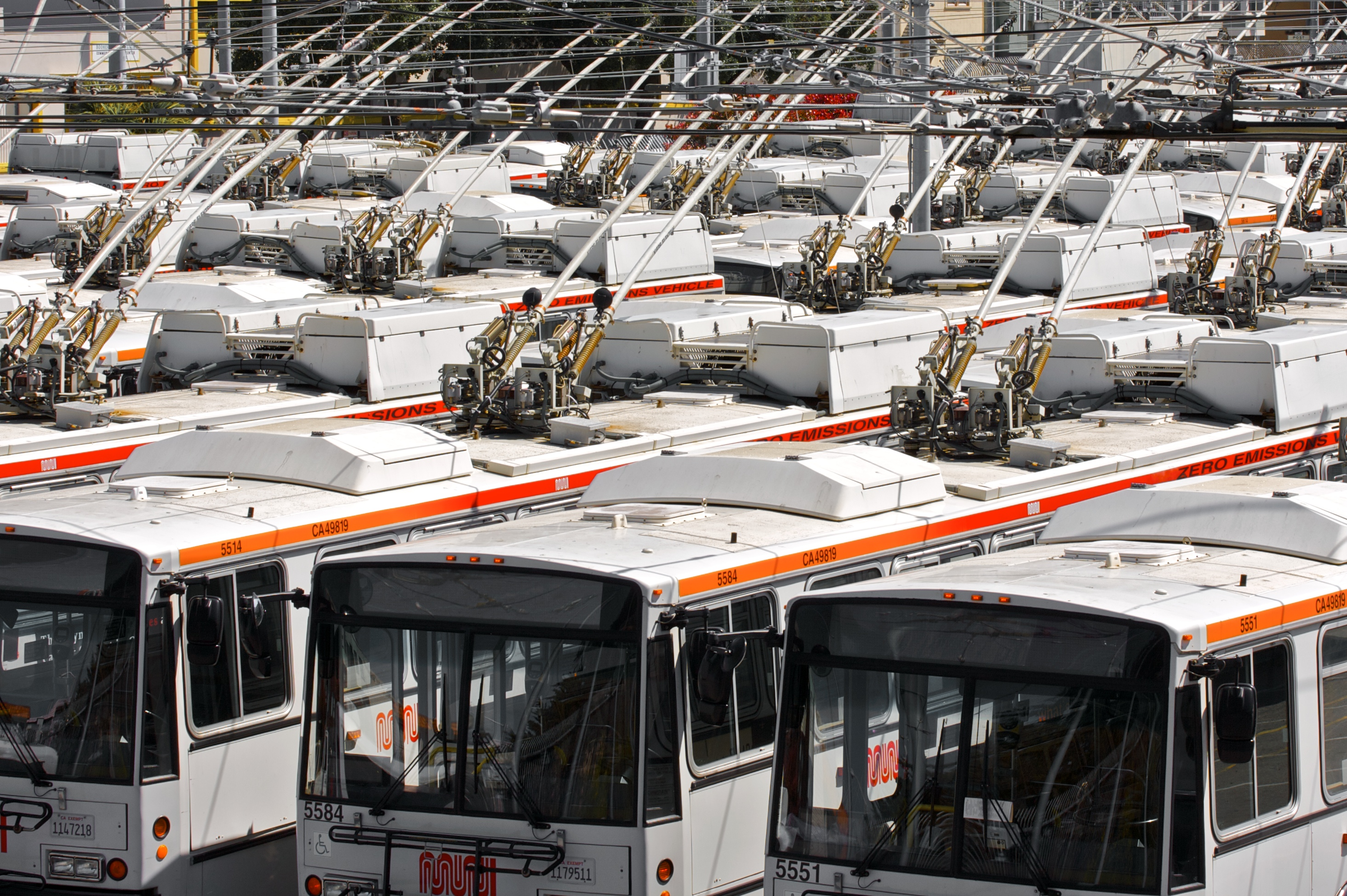
ETI 14TrSF at Presidio Division (garage) in 2008

Domesticated 14Tr trolleybuses that had been delivered earlier to Miami Valley RTA had some electrical issues related to the auxiliary power unit enabling off-wire operation; the cost of fixing those issues forced ETI to ask for a cash advance on its contract with Muni in 1999. The ETI trolleybuses were assembled at Pier 15; manufacturing started in the Czech Republic with frames, motors and controls, continued in Hunt Valley, Maryland, where the body, paint, under-flooring and wiring were added, and finished in San Francisco. The manufacturing activities were designed to meet "Buy America" regulations required for vehicles procured using federal assistance.

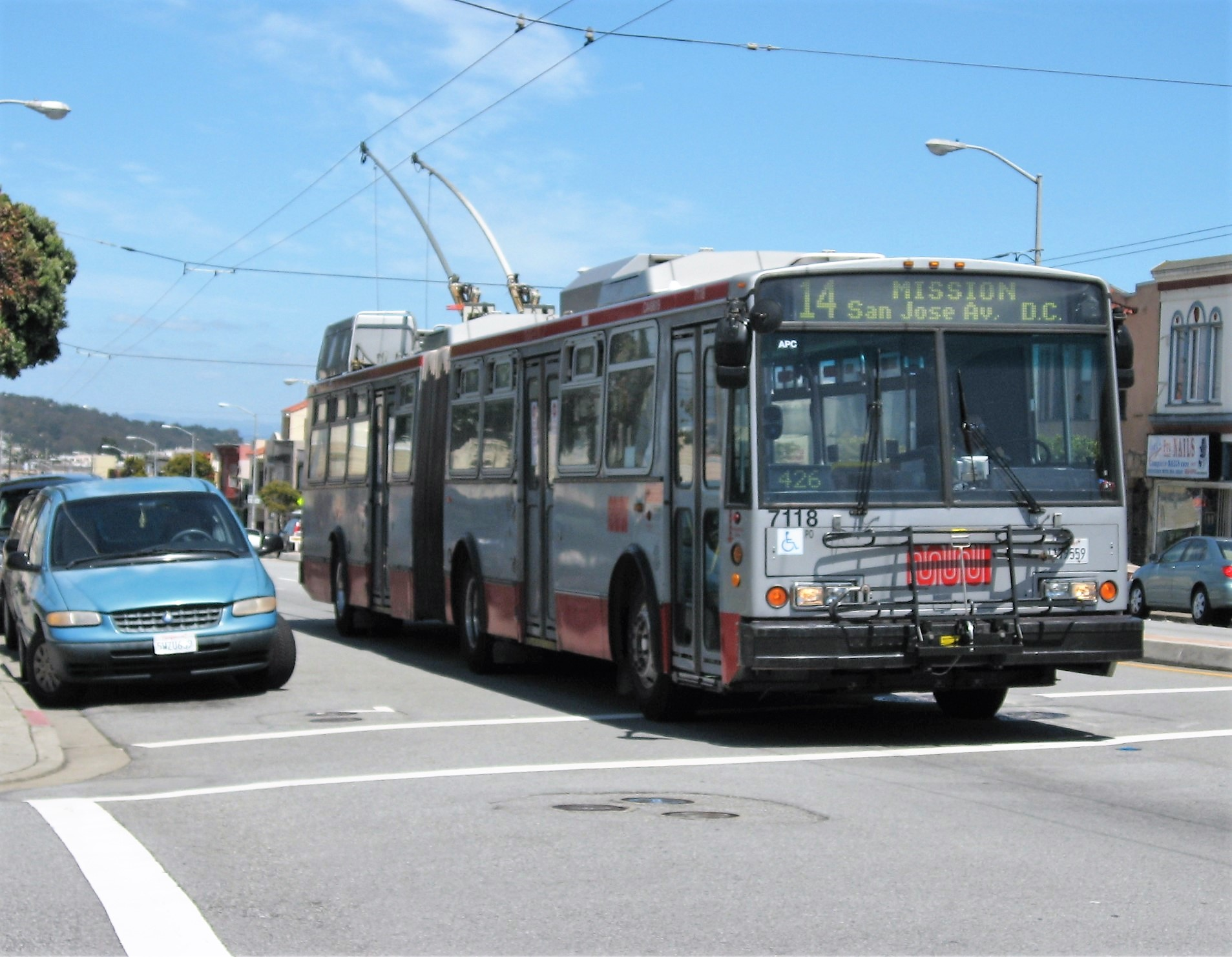
ETI 15TrSF

The 14TrSF displaced the prior Flyer E800 fleet, and the 15TrSF complemented the Flyer E60s. After the initial deployment of the ETI trolleybuses in 2002, the nuts securing the brakes to the axle were found to be loose. By January 2010, the exclusively high-floor Muni trolleybus fleet included 313 serviceable vehicles, comprising three different types, of which 240 were 40-foot conventional (two-axle) units, the ETI 14TrSF, and 73 were 60-foot articulated buses, 33 ETI 15TrSF and 40 New Flyer E60 vehicles built in 1993–94. Parts for the ETI trolleybuses needed to be shipped from the Czech Republic, increasing the time spent out of service.

The MDBF of the ETI 14TrSF and 15TrSF trolleybuses was approximately 2,000 miles (3,200 km) for January 2011 and 2012. However, as they aged, the ETI trolleybuses were temporarily pulled from service for repairs after several caught fire in 2014 and 2015. In a separate incident that occurred in 2016, the traction motor control circuit failed on ETI 14TrSF No. 5623 and the bus failed to respond to both the brake pedal and the emergency brake, rear-ending a parked delivery truck. By 2017, the 14TrSF fleet had aged to a point where they were collectively responsible for nearly half of all Muni service delays resulting from mechanical failures.

=== Return to New Flyer ===
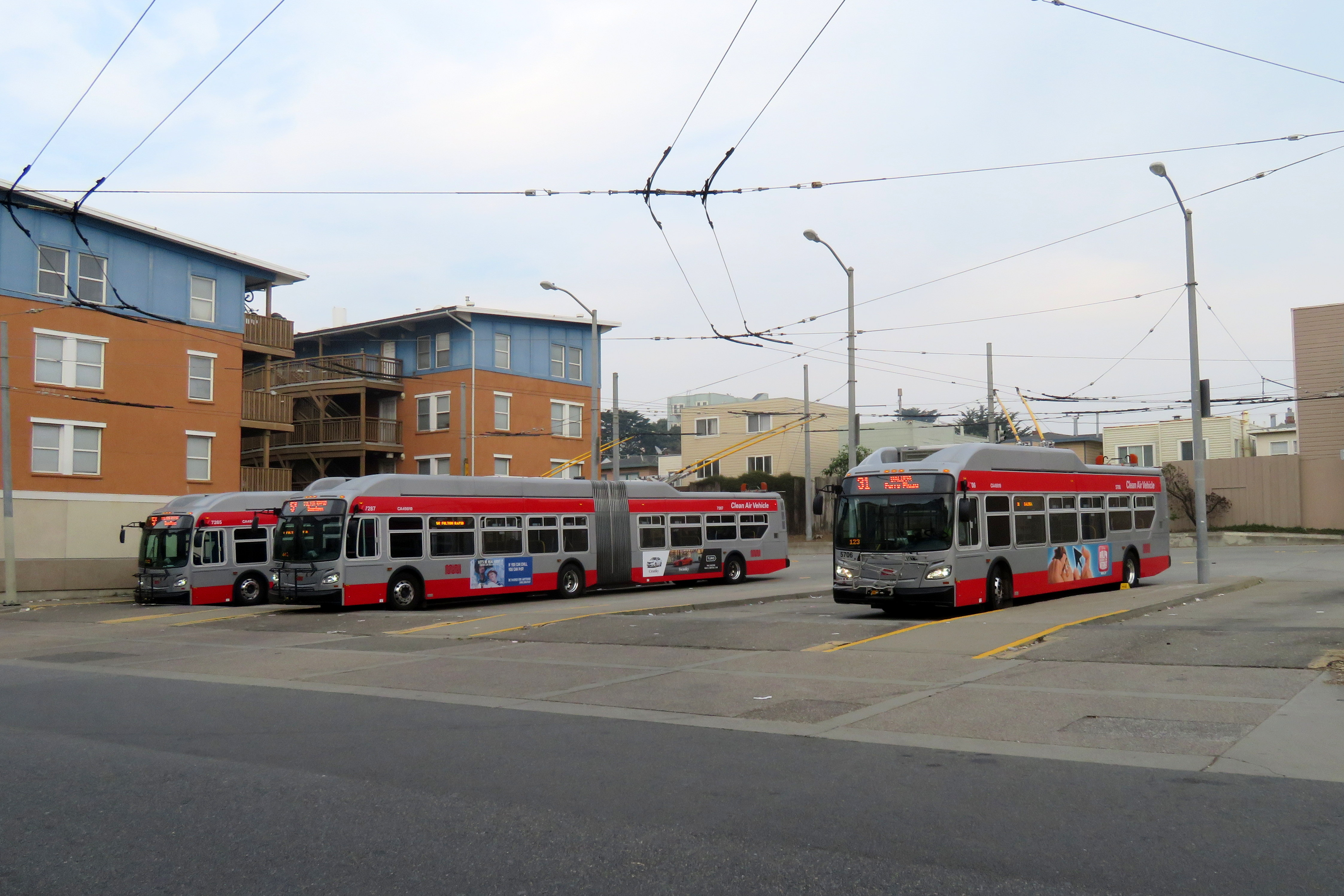
New Flyer XT40 and XT60 at Cabrillo and La Playa loop (2018)

In 2013, the SFMTA adopted plans for an eventual one-for-one replacement of the existing trolleybus fleet in a joint procurement with King County Metro and New Flyer over technical specifications and pricing. The first order to be placed under the 2013 agreement was the 2014 order to replace the 61 articulated trolleybuses remaining in the fleet (28 E60 and 33 15TrSF) with 60 New Flyer XT60 articulated low-floor trolleybuses, delivery of which began in 2015. These are the trolleybus system's first low-floor vehicles. Two prototypes (Nos. 7201 and 7202) arrived in March 2015 and May 2015, respectively, and entered service in May and September 2015. Delivery of the 58 production-series vehicles began in September 2015, and the series entered service between November 2015 and July 2016.

The last of the 33 ETI 15TrSF articulated trolleybuses were retired in April–May 2016. These changes left the fleet with 240 conventional 40-foot units built by ETI (model 14TrSF) and 60 articulated New Flyer XT60s. In July 2016, an order for an additional 33 New Flyer XT60 articulated buses was placed via a first contract amendment, intended as an expansion of the 60-foot articulated fleet. Delivery of the 33 additional XT60 coaches was completed by March 2018. According to internal testing in November 2015, the New Flyer XT60 articulated trolleybuses are limited to routes with grades of less than 10%.

The second and final contract amendment under the 2013 agreement added an order for 185 two-axle, 40-foot New Flyer XT40 trolleybuses, which received final approval in June 2017. These vehicles will replace the remaining ETIs. Although Muni has options for an additional 55 XT40 trolleybuses (which would bring the total order to 240 40-foot XT40s as a one-for-one replacement of the ETI 14TrSF fleet), the option was not exercised because the first contract amendment in 2016 for 33 additional XT60 articulated trolleybuses provided sufficient system capacity. In the 2010 Fleet Management Plan, Muni anticipated the growth in ridership on routes served by trolleybuses would be accommodated by an increased proportion of articulated vehicles in the fleet. By September 7, 2019, the fleet of 40-foot ETI 14TrSF trolleybuses was withdrawn from service, which left the all-New Flyer fleet at 93 60-foot XT60s and 185 40-foot XT40s.

=== Current fleet ===
The present fleet includes 40-foot (12 m) standard trolleybuses and 60-foot (18 m) articulated trolleybuses. Trolleybuses are assigned to Potrero and Presidio Divisions (garages), with the 60-foot articulated trolleybuses operating exclusively from Potrero.

Current San Francisco trolleybus fleet
Fleet numbers	Quantity	Manufacturer	Propulsion	Model	Configuration	Year built	Image	Notes
7201–7260	60	New Flyer	Vossloh Kiepe	XT60	60' articulated, low-floor	2015–2016		All assigned to Potrero Division
7261–7293	33	New Flyer	Vossloh Kiepe	XT60	60' articulated, low-floor	2017–2018		Option exercised in mid-2016.
5701–5885	185	New Flyer	Vossloh Kiepe	XT40	40' standard, low-floor	2017–2019		

=== Retired fleet ===
The trolleybus system's original fleet, owned and operated by the Market Street Railway when only MSRy was operating trolleybuses in San Francisco, were built by the J. G. Brill Company. MSRy merged with Muni in 1944, and in the years since then the trolleybus fleet has also included vehicles built by the St. Louis Car Company, Marmon-Herrington, Twin Coach, and Flyer Industries.

Several trolleybuses have been preserved after serving in San Francisco:

- No. 506 (built by St. Louis Car Company in 1939, but not placed in service until 1941)
- Nos. 530 and 536 (Marmon-Herrington TC40, at Orange Empire Railway Museum (OERM))
- No. 614 (Twin Coach 44TTW, at OERM)
- No. 776 (Marmon-Herrington TC48)
- No. 5300 (Flyer E800)
- No. 5538 (ETI 14TrSF)

None of the retired ETI 15TrSF articulated trolleybuses have been saved for the historical fleet. An E60, vehicle 7031, was saved for four years until 2019, when it was sent to auction. Muni withdrew the auction for 7031 at the request of interested preservation groups.

Retired San Francisco trolleybus fleet
Fleet #	Qty	Manufacturer	Propulsion	Model	Config	Year built	Image	Last Retired	Preserved	Refs.
51–54	9	J. G. Brill Company	GE 1154A	—	33' Conv	1935 (Note: 51–59 were originally built for MSRy; acquired by Muni in 1944.)		1949 or 1954	-none-	
55–58	9	J. G. Brill Company	WH 1428CT9	—	33' Conv	1935		1949 or 1954	-none-	
59	9	J. G. Brill Company	GE 1154A	—	33' Conv	1935		1949 or 1954	-none-	
501–504	25	St. Louis Car Company	GE 1216	Job 1704	35' Conv (Note: 501–509 are 34 ft 8 1/2 in (10.579 m) long; 510–525 are slightly longer at 34 ft 10 1/4 in (10.624 m).)	1939 (Note: 501–509 were originally built for Muni "R" line. Although built in December 1939, they did not enter service until 1941.)		1954	506 (Note: Cosmetically restored, but not operational.)	
505–509	25	St. Louis Car Company	WH 1442	Job 1704	35' Conv	1939		1954	506	
510–525	25	St. Louis Car Company	WH 1442F1	Job 1731	35' Conv	1947 (Note: 510–525 were originally built for Muni Union-Howard-South Van Ness line.)		1954	-none-	
526–549	25	Marmon-Herrington	GE 1213-J3	TC40	34' Conv	1948		1954 (Note: "Baby Marmons", largely retired by 1954 and scrapped by 1969 with a few exceptions.)	530, (Note: At Orange Empire Railway Museum.) 536, 541 (Note: Private purchase; donated to Marmon for research.)	
550–569	20	Marmon-Herrington	GE 1213-J1	TC44	37' Conv	1949		1977 (Note: "Medium Marmons": Coach nos. 552, 559, 561, 566, 569 were sold to Mexico City in 1978; remainder scrapped.)	-none-	
570–659	90	Twin Coach	WH 1442-A1A	44TTW	36' Conv	1949		1977 (Note: 617 scrapped after 1963 accident; 570 fitted with batteries as an experiment.)	614	
660–739	80	Marmon-Herrington	GE 1213-J1	TC44	37' Conv	1949		1977 (Note: "Medium Marmons": Coach nos. 660, 664, 666, 667, 669, 673, 674, 676, 678, 679, 682-684, 686, 687, 689-691, 693, 694, 696, 698-700, 702, 704-707, 709, 711, 712, 714, 717-721, 726-728, 730, 732, 733, 735, 737, 739 were sold to Mexico City in 1978.)	-none-	
740–789	110	Marmon-Herrington	GE 1213-J1	TC48	39' Conv	1950		1977 (Note: "Large Marmons": GE coach nos. 740, 741, 743, 744, 748, 752-755, 757-760, 762, 764-767, 769, 770, 772, 777, 779-783, 786, 789 were sold to Mexico City in 1978.)	776 (Note: By Market Street Railway. This vehicle was once believed to have originally been numbered 786 and renumbered to 776 for Bicentennial celebrations, information given in the books The People's Railway and Inside Muni, but that information was eventually found to have been erred, and the preserved no. 776 is the original 776.)	
790–849	110	Marmon-Herrington	WH 1442-A1A	TC48	39' Conv	1950		1977	776	
850–889	40	St. Louis Car Company	GE 1213-J1	Job 1767	40' Conv	1951		1977	-none- (Note: Coach nos. 854, 867, 882, 886 scrapped; remainder sold to Mexico City in 1978.)	
5001–5002	345	Flyer Industries	GE 1213J	E700A	40' Conv	1972–1973		1999	-none- (Note: 5001 originally numbered 890, reusing running gear from a "baby Marmon"; 5002 originally built for Hamilton Street Railway with double-width rear door.)	
5003–5345	345	Flyer Industries	GE 1213J	E800	40' Conv	1976–1977		2007	5300, 5345	
5401–5640	240	Electric Transit, Inc. (ETI) (Škoda/AAI Corp.)	Vossloh Kiepe	14TrSF	40' Conv	1999–2003		2019	5538	
7000–7059	60	New Flyer	General Electric	E60	60' Artic	1992, 1993–1994		2015	7031 (Note: 7031 was briefly put up for auction in May 2019; auction was withdrawn by Muni following requests from interested preservation groups.)	
7101–7133	33	Electric Transit Inc. (ETI)	Vossloh Kiepe	15TrSF	60' Artic	2003		2016	-none-	

An additional historic trolleybus that is owned by Muni but only operated in service on a single day in 1988, is an ex-Seattle 1940 Twin Coach GWFT acquired by Muni in 1987. Restoration of Seattle 614 (originally 836) in 1987 included repainting in the color scheme of the former Market Street Railway Company and lettering as MSRy "50", a fictitious fleet number to represent MSRy's similar-looking trolleybuses 51–59, which were built by Brill, none of which had been preserved. It operated in service on route 33 on February 6, 1988, in celebration of the opening of an extension. It broke down after only about two hours, and ultimately was never repaired, but in 2020 it was still owned by Muni and was being stored (since 2019) at the Cow Palace arena, in space rented by the transit agency.

=== Infrastructure ===
- Market Street Railway (overhead lines)
- Stockton Street Tunnel
- Van Ness Bus Rapid Transit

== See also ==
- San Francisco Municipal Railway fleet
- List of trolleybus systems in the United States
