= Union Street (San Francisco) =

Street in San Francisco, California, United States

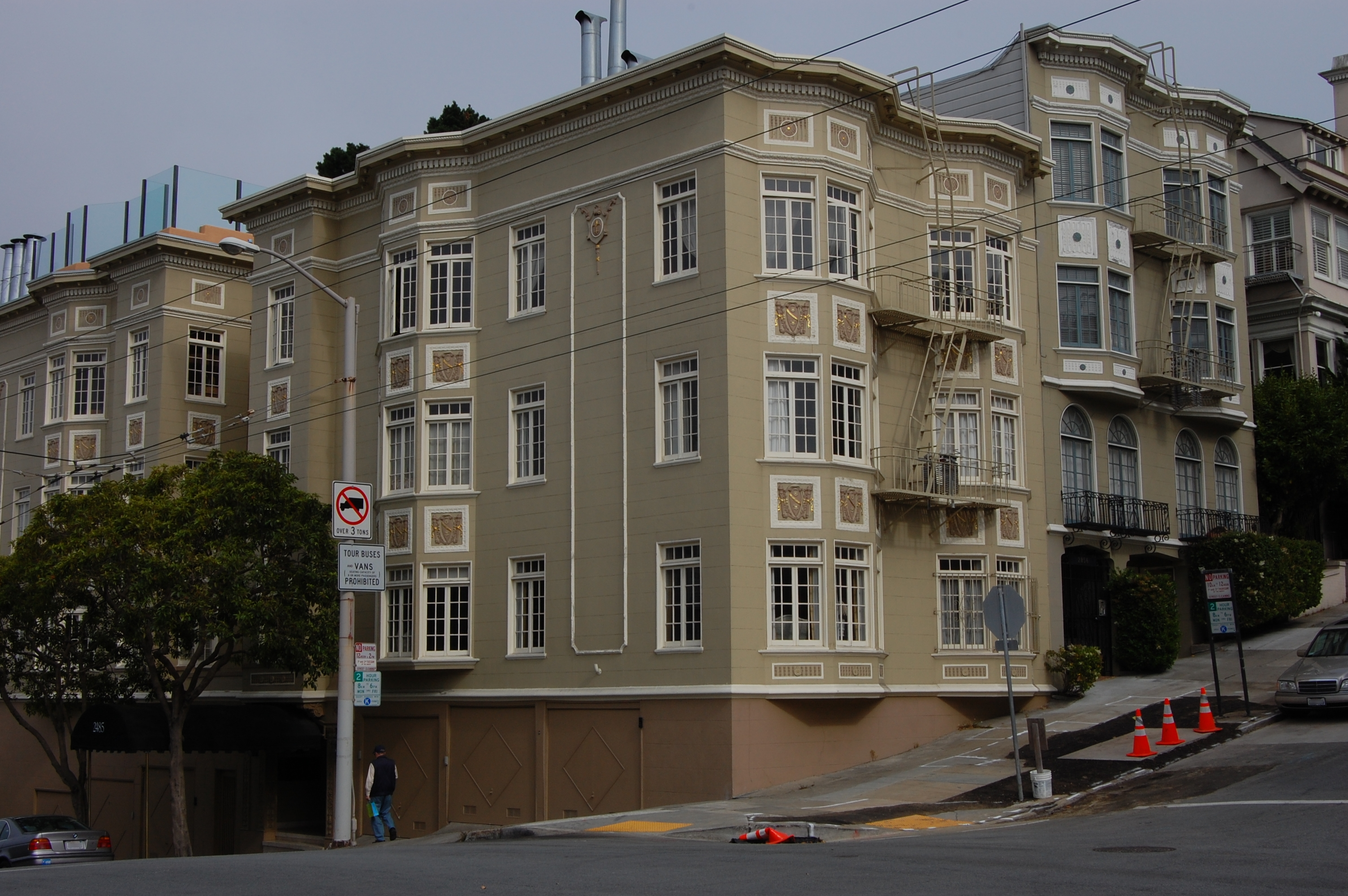
- Houses on Union Street
- Interactive map of Union Street
- Location: San Francisco, California, United States
- West end: Lyon Street in Cow Hollow
- East end: Front Street at the Embarcadero

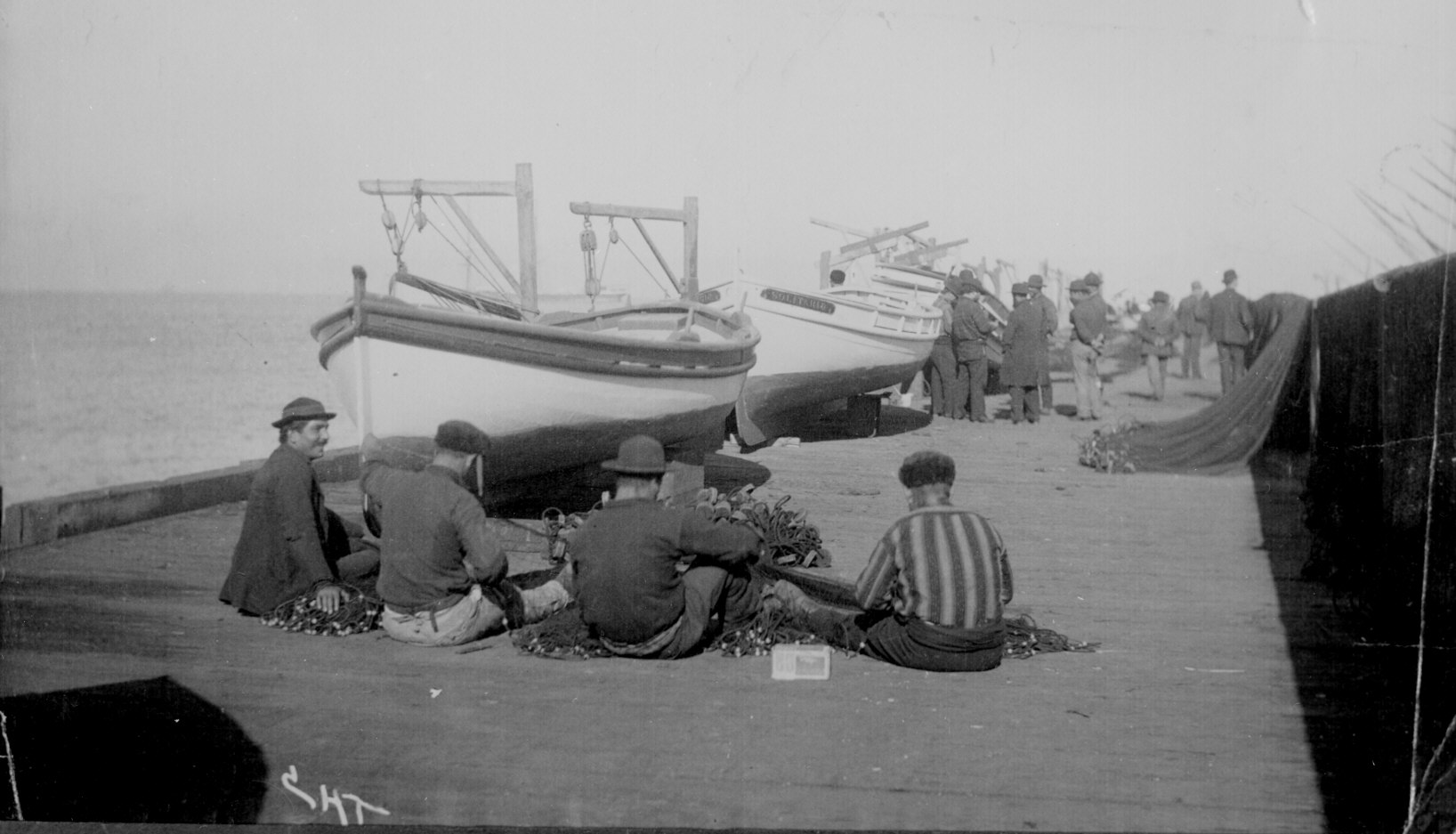
Italian fishermen mending nets on wharf at foot of Union Street in San Francisco. Boats are lined up on the wharf for painting and repairs, ca. 1891.

Union Street is an east–west street in San Francisco. It starts out near the Embarcadero waterfront, with a half-block gap on Telegraph Hill before resuming near Montgomery Street, then runs through the neighborhoods of Telegraph Hill, North Beach, and Russian Hill. From Franklin Street westward to Steiner Street, Union Street becomes a shopping street. The western terminus of Union Street is at Lyon Street, which runs along the west wall of the Presidio.

The westernmost part of Union Street is considered to be in Cow Hollow, however, neighborhood definitions vary, and which neighborhoods the Union Street shopping district is considered to be located varies between sources. Some descriptions treat the entire stretch of the street west of Van Ness Avenue as being in Cow Hollow, while by other definitions (notably that of the Cow Hollow Association), the stretch of Union Street east of Steiner Street (including the entire shopping district) and nearby streets are not part of Cow Hollow, but instead constitute their own neighborhood, either eponymously called Union Street or, alternately, Golden Gate Valley. The Pacific Heights Residents Association considers Union Street as marking the dividing line between Cow Hollow to the north and Pacific Heights to the south.

The historic McElroy Octagon House is located at the intersection of Union and Gough Streets, in the eastern part of the shopping district.

It is the only east–west street that allows two-way traffic to traverse Russian Hill (all others have gaps or one-way segments). The Muni 45 Union/Stockton and 41 Union bus lines, both utilizing Union Street, are the only Muni bus lines that cross Russian Hill east-west.
