= 31 Balboa =

Trolleybus line operated by the San Francisco Municipal Railway

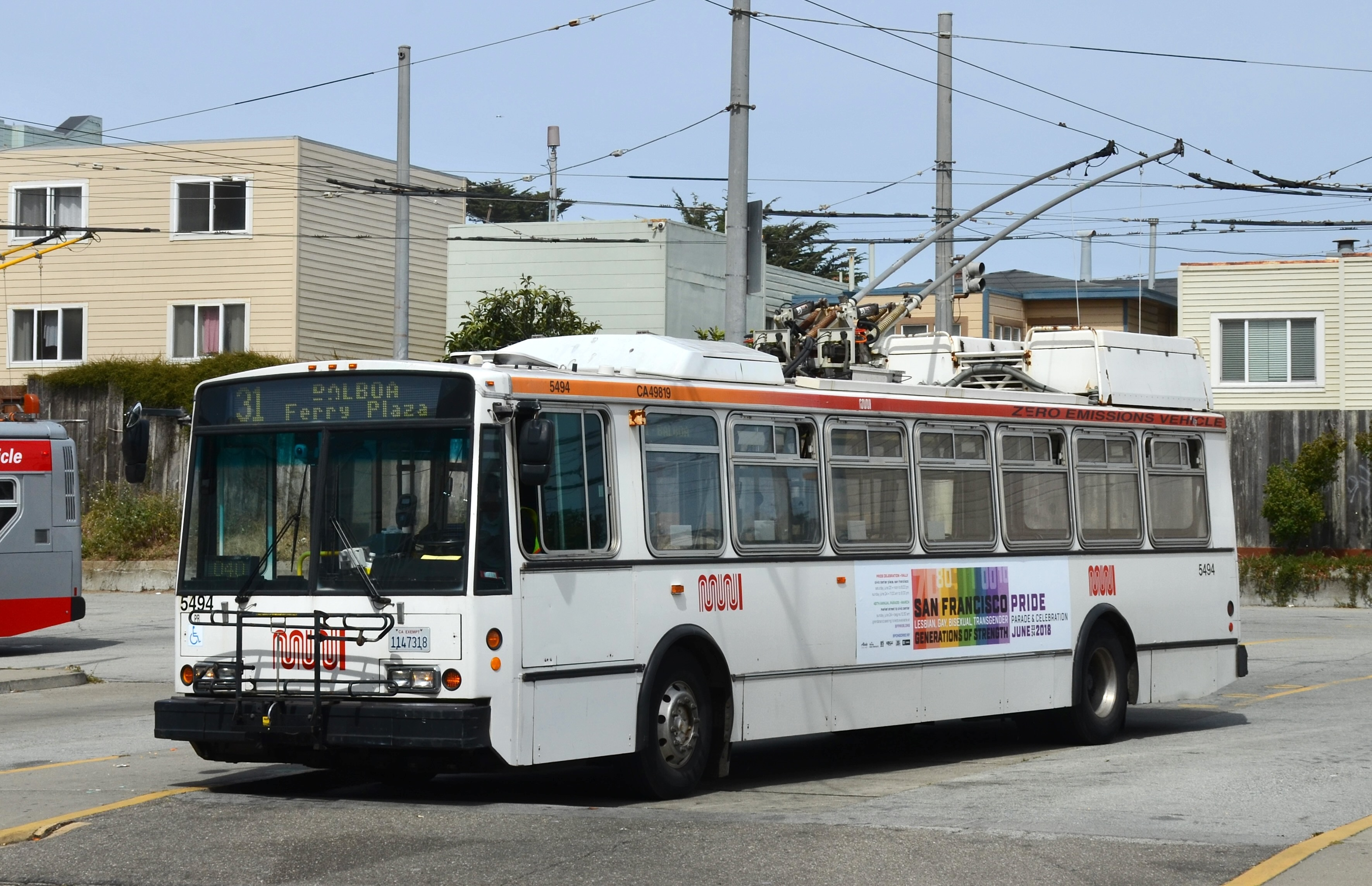
- An ETI at the route's outer terminus, La Playa and Cabrillo, 2018

Overview
- System: Muni trolleybus network
- Operator: San Francisco Municipal Railway
- Vehicle: New Flyer XT40
- Began service: May 15, 1932

Route
- Locale: San Francisco, California
- Start: Powell Street station
- Via: Eddy St, Turk Blvd, Balboa St
- End: Cabrillo and La Playa
- Length: 6.2 miles (10.0 km)
- Other routes: 31AX, 31BX
- Daily ridership: 8,800 (2019)
- Map: 31 Balboa

31 Balboa is a trolleybus line operated by the San Francisco Municipal Railway. It is one of several routes operating between the Financial District and the Richmond District.

== Route description ==
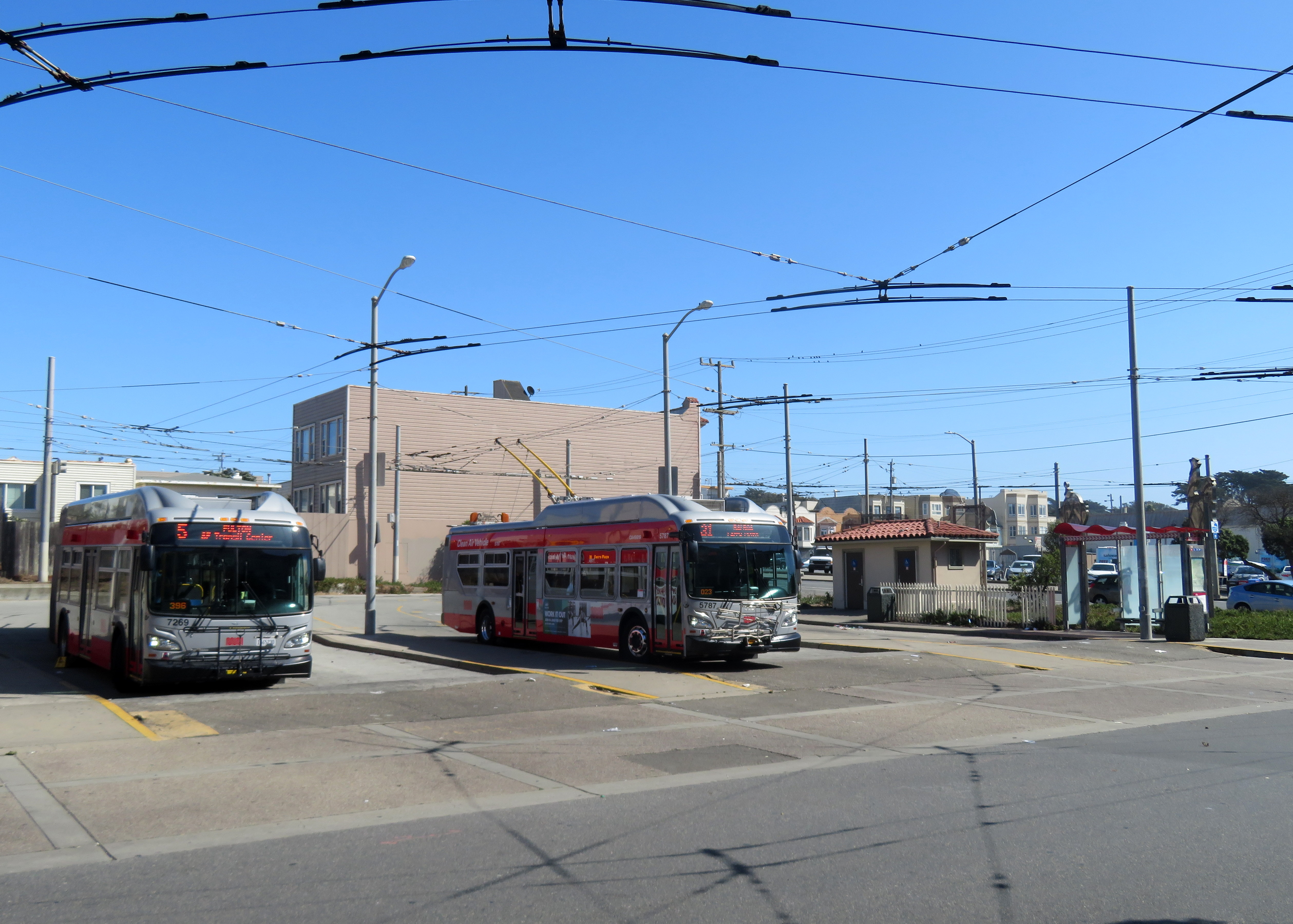
The outer terminus at La Playa and Cabrillo

The outbound terminal is located at Cabrillo and La Playa, shared with the 5 Fulton. It runs inbound on Cabrillo to 45th Avenue where it runs a block north to Balboa Street. East of Arguello Boulevard the route continues on Turk Boulevard. It turns at Divisadero to run another block north on Eddy. The line splits between Larkin and Mason, with inbound buses continuing on Eddy while outbound buses run on Turk Street. The lines turns on and off Market Street via Turk and Mason, running as far inbound to the end of Market and turning around via Spear and Mission to terminate on Steuart.

As of 2025, the truncated route turns around at Cyril Magnin and Market above Hallidie Plaza and Powell Street station.

=== 31X Balboa Express services ===
Two express limited services operate along the corridor. The 31AX Balboa 'A' Express runs from the outbound terminal at La Playa as far as Park Presidio Boulevard, where it runs express to Embarcadero station using Park Presidio, Geary Boulevard, Masonic, Bush, Sansome, and California with outbound buses running on Pine. 31BX Balboa 'B' Express operates local starting at Park Presidio and running inbound on Balboa, Turk, Masonic, and Geary before going express on Presidio and the route of the A Express. These services were discontinued in 2020 amid the COVID-19 pandemic.

== History ==
The 31 Balboa was established as a streetcar line on May 15, 1932, by the Market Street Railway. It was the last entirely new streetcar line built in the city (until 1995). Its opening likely caused the discontinuation of Muni's A Geary–10th Avenue line six months later. Rail service ended on July 2, 1949 and was replaced with motor coach service — the last few months saw the streetcar's terminus truncated to Market and Eddy.

Service was extended from Balboa and 30th Avenue to Ocean Beach in 1979. The express services were split in two, designated as "A" and "B", in 1982. Owl service was discontinued in 1992. Trolleybus infrastructure was installed on the line with completion in May 1992, but electrified service began on July 5, 1993 for limited runs after issues with the newly enacted Americans with Disabilities Act affected the availability of rolling stock. The full trolleybus conversion took place on March 12, 1994.

The line was temporarily suspended in 2020 amid the COVID-19 pandemic. A truncated version of the route terminating at Powell Street station was reinstated on August 14, 2021. The route was extended on August 19, 2023, to its weekday terminus at Caltrain Depot; the Powell Street station terminus was kept for weekend use. Due to funding shortfalls, weekday 31 service was truncated back to Powell Street station on June 21, 2025. Effective June 6, 2026, inbound trips that only go as far as Presidio Division have a drop-off-only stop on Geary Boulevard at Masonic Avenue.
