= 33 Ashbury/18th Street =

Line of the San Francisco Municipal Railway

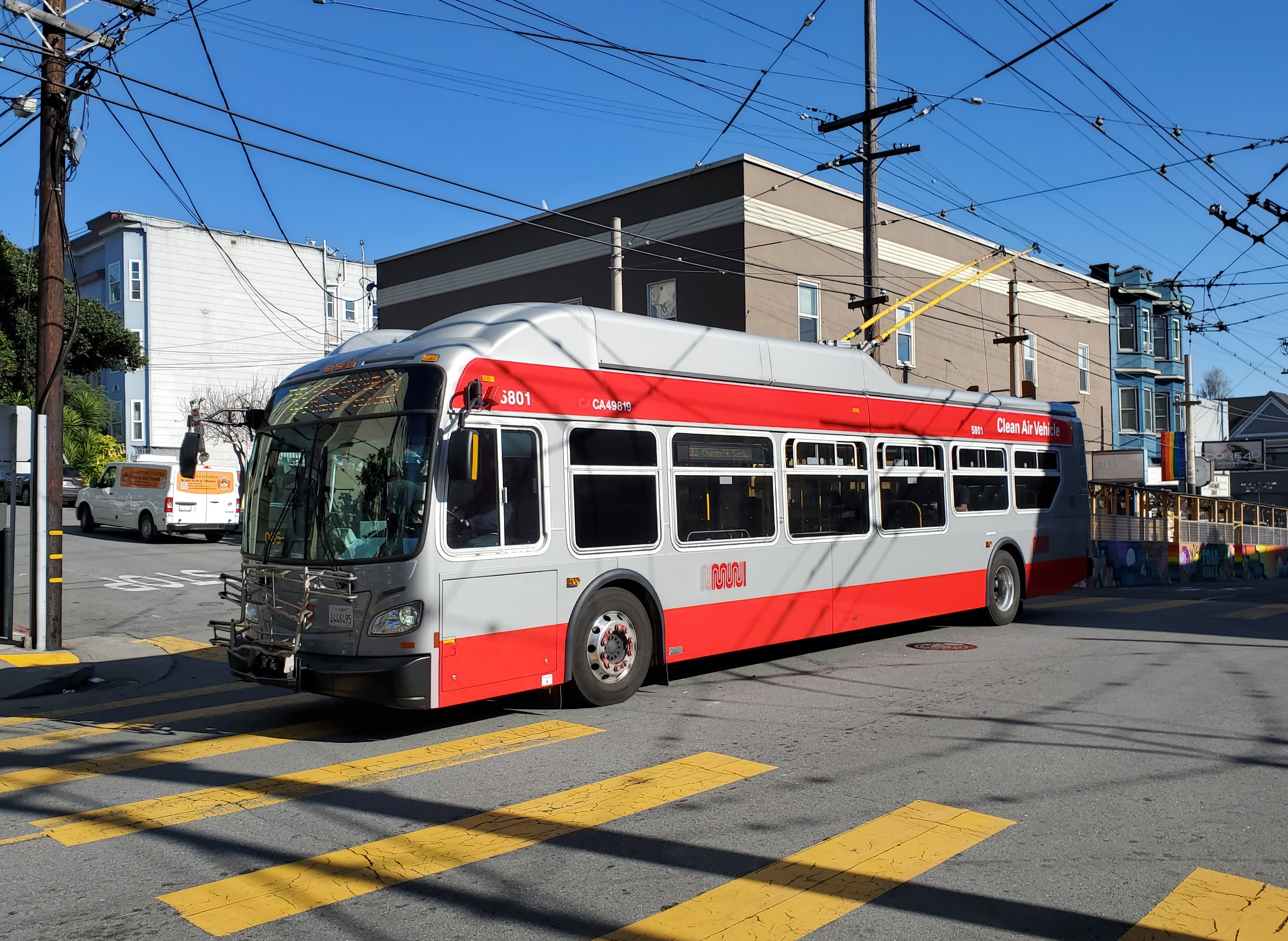
- 33-Ashbury/18th Street trolleybus on 18th Street in 2021

Overview
- System: Muni trolleybus network
- Operator: San Francisco Municipal Railway
- Vehicle: New Flyer XT40
- Status: operational
- Began service: 1892 (streetcar); October 6, 1935 (trolleybus)
- Predecessors: 33 18th and Park

Route
- Locale: San Francisco, California
- Start: Sacramento and Cherry
- End: 25th Street and Potrero
- Length: 6.6 miles (10.6 km)

Service
- Frequency: 15 minutes
- Weekend frequency: 20 minutes
- Daily ridership: 5,700 (2019)
- Map: 33 Ashbury/18th Street

33 Ashbury/18th Street is a trolleybus line operated by the San Francisco Municipal Railway. The route is descendant from the first trolleybus service to open in San Francisco, California, United States.

== Route description ==
From 25th Street and Potrero, buses loop north to run on Potrero to 16th Street. After turning west on 16th, the line runs past 16th Street Mission BART station. It briefly runs south on Mission Street until 18th Street. After 18th merges into Market Street, buses continue until a sharp turn onto Clayton. At the corner of Haight and Ashbury, the route turns onto Haight Street and runs until Golden Gate Park, where it takes a right onto Stanyan Street. It doglegs onto Arguello via Fulton and continues north until it loops to its terminus at Sacramento and Cherry Streets, adjacent to the California Pacific Medical Center California Campus.

== History ==
=== Streetcar line ===
An electric streetcar line had been promoted as a key feature of the development of the Clarendon Heights neighborhood in the early 1890s. The 33 Line was established in 1892 by the San Francisco and San Mateo Railway Company as the 18th and Park or 18th Street Branch route. That route initially ran along 18th from Guerrero to Douglass before being extended to Frederick and Ashbury including a sharp switchback on the lower slopes of Twin Peaks at Market and Clayton by May 1894. The line was blocked from continuing to Golden Gate Park because the Market Street Railway Company had their line on Frederick Street, denying the SF&SM any further access. Cars on the line were specially equipped with transverse seating so riders would not change orientation when negotiating the switchback junction.

=== Trolleybus operation ===
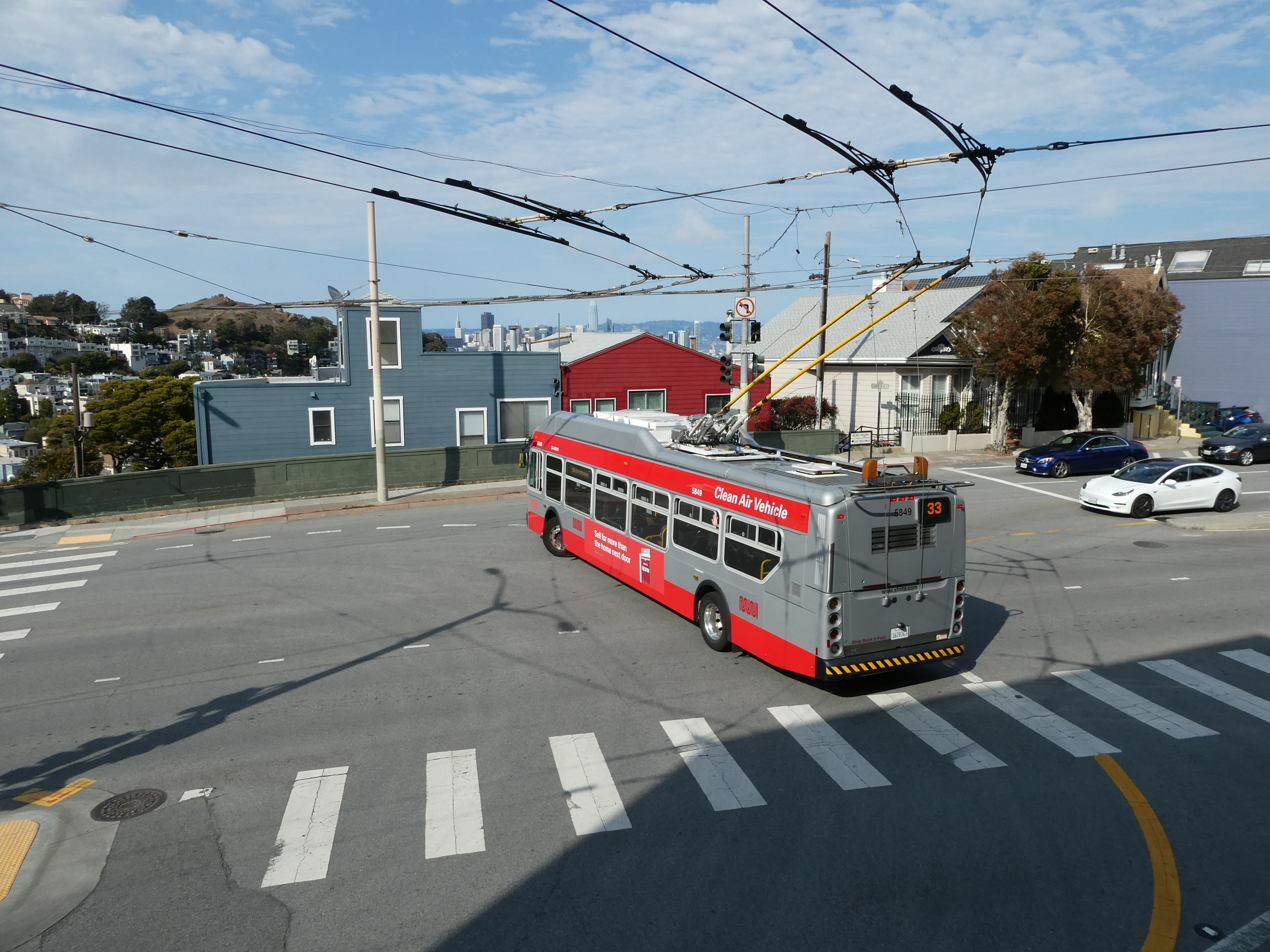
A trolleybus navigating the sharp curve at Market and Clayton

In April 1934, Col. John H. Skeggs of the State Highway Department urged the conversion of the 33 streetcar to "trackless trolley", as some of its tracks would have to be taken up for the construction of the Bay Bridge. By early August of that year, the Market Street Railway Company (MSRy), eventual successor to the San Francisco and San Mateo, applied to the State Railroad Commission for permission to build and operate a trackless trolley system. (Note: At least one source, the Oakland Tribune, reported that this would be the first trackless trolley (trolleybus) system in California, but that was incorrect, as a commercial trolleybus system had operated in Laurel Canyon, Los Angeles, from 1910 to 1915.) Permission was granted by August 30, and the first trolleybus service started on October 6, 1935, using 9 coaches built by the J. G. Brill Company. At the time of conversion, the 33 streetcar had operated between Third & Harrison (Downtown) and Waller & Stanyan (Golden Gate Park), a round trip of 10.2 miles (16.4 km). The San Francisco Municipal Railway acquired the company's assets in 1944 and began operating the line.

Operations were moved to the Potrero division after the Haight Barn suffered structural failure in 1946. Service on Potrero Street to San Francisco General Hospital began on August 24, 1983. The south end of this extension was at Army Street (now César Chávez Street), and its opening brought into use a newly built section of overhead wires south of 25th Street. The overhead wires along Potrero Street north of 25th Street had already existed for several years and been in use by route 47, which was a trolleybus route at that time (and which continued to terminate at 25th Street after the August 1983 changes).

At its opposite end, route 33 was extended from Haight to Sacramento Street on February 6, 1988, and renamed from 33 Ashbury to 33 Stanyan. On December 21, 1988, service at the route's southern end was cut back from Army Street to 25th Street. The approximately 2,000 feet (610 m) of wires that had opened for use in 1983 remained usable in the mid-2010s and had occasionally been used for temporary diversions necessitated by construction on 25th.

Twenty-seven years after its last name change, in April 2015, route 33 was renamed again, to its current name of 33 Ashbury/18th Street. Service was temporarily suspended for parts of 2020 and 2021 amid the COVID-19 pandemic, resuming on January 23, 2021.
