= Fulton Street Line =

Fulton Street Line may refer to the following transit lines:

- IND Fulton Street Line, a rapid transit line of the IND Division of the New York City Subway, running from the Cranberry Street Tunnel under the East River through all of central Brooklyn to a terminus in Ozone Park, Queens
- Fulton Street Line (elevated), a former elevated rail line mostly in Brooklyn, New York, that ran above Fulton Street from Fulton Ferry Downtown Brooklyn east to East New York, continuing to a terminus in Ozone Park, Queens, that ran 1888–1940
- Fulton Street Line (Brooklyn surface), a public transit line in Brooklyn, New York, along Fulton Street between Fulton Ferry and East New York. Originally a streetcar line in 1854; buses were substituted for streetcars in 1941
- Fulton Street Crosstown Line, a former streetcar in Manhattan, see List of streetcar lines in Manhattan#East-west lines
- 5 Fulton line of San Francisco Municipal Railway; originally the 5 McAllister streetcar, replaced by a trolley bus in 1948 and renamed 5 Fulton in 1976; see List of San Francisco Municipal Railway lines
