= 1 California (bus line) =

San Francisco trolleybus route

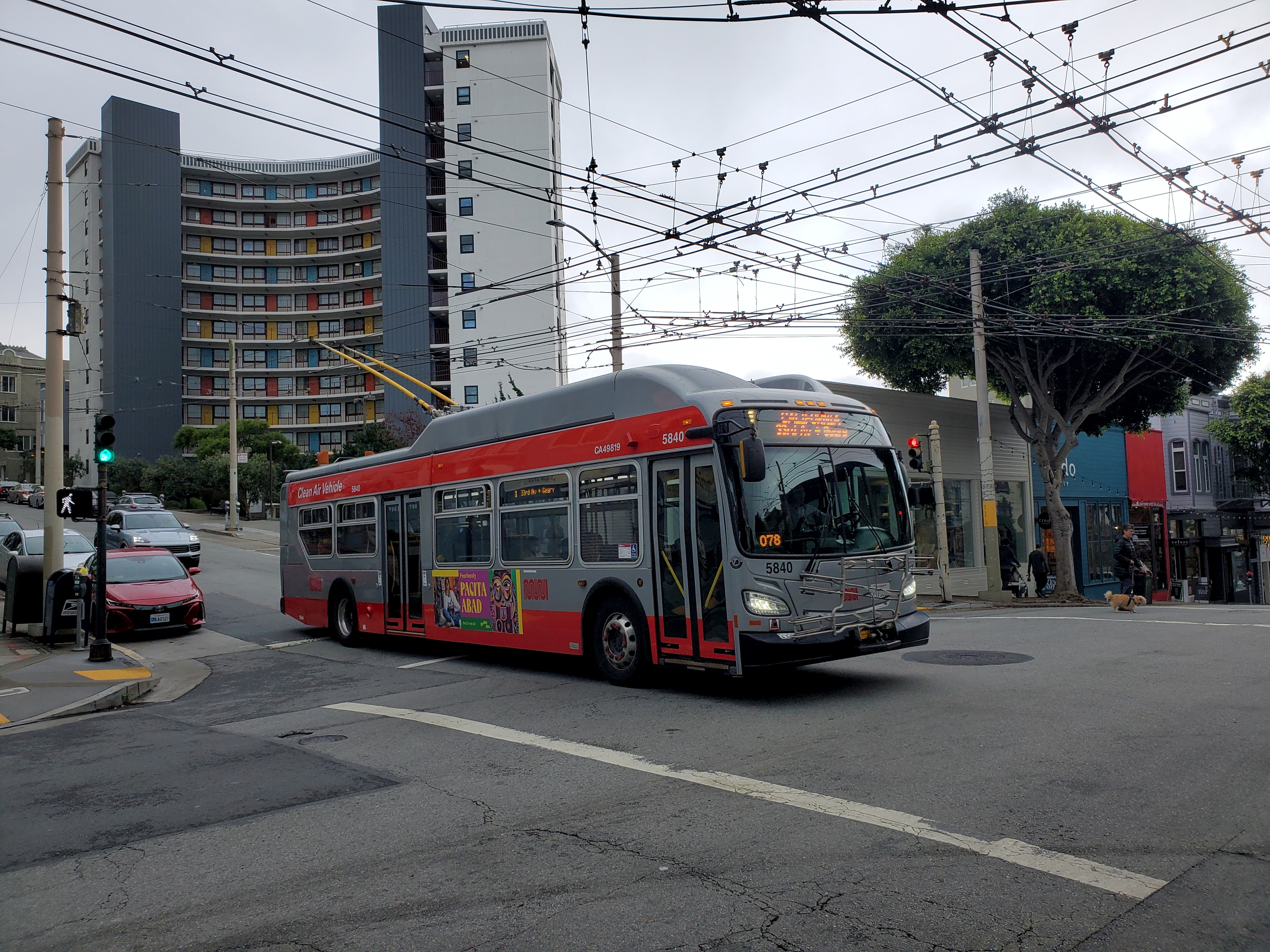
- 1 California trolleybus in Pacific Heights in 2023

Overview
- System: Muni trolleybus network
- Operator: San Francisco Municipal Railway
- Garage: Presidio Division (1); Flynn Division (1X)
- Vehicle: New Flyer XT40 (1); New Flyer XDE60 (1X)

Route
- Locale: San Francisco, California
- Start: Clay and Drumm
- Via: California St, Clay St, Sacramento St
- End: Geary and 33rd Avenue
- Length: 5.7 miles (9.2 km)
- Other routes: 1X

Service
- Frequency: 8–11m
- Weekend frequency: 11–12m
- Daily ridership: 17,100 (June 2024); 400 (1X, June 2024)
- Map: 1 California Map

The 1 California is a trolleybus line operated by the San Francisco Municipal Railway (Muni). It provides service between the Richmond District and Financial District via California Street.

== Route description ==
Inbound (eastbound) 1 California buses originate at Geary Boulevard and 33rd Avenue in the Richmond District and proceed northbound on 32nd Avenue to California Street. The route runs on California Street for approximately 3 mi (4.8 km), and shifts one block north to Sacramento Street via Steiner Street. Inbound buses shift one block further northward to Clay Street via Gough Street, and terminate at the intersection of Clay Street and Drumm Street in the Financial District.

Outbound (westbound) buses originate at Clay Street and Drumm Street, and proceed westbound on Sacramento Street to Gough Street, where they rejoin the inbound route to the Richmond District.

Short turn trips on the 1 California terminate at California Street and Presidio Avenue. This terminus is one block away from the Presidio Yard, where 1 California buses are stored and serviced.

=== 1X California Express services ===
The 1X California Express operates in the peak direction during weekday rush hours, with limited service. 1X buses follow the route of the 1 California from Geary and 33rd to California Street and Arguello Street. Inbound 1X buses run nonstop to the Financial District via Bush Street, terminating at Davis Street. Outbound 1X buses originate at Sacramento Street and Davis Street, running nonstop to California and Arguello via Pine Street.

== History ==
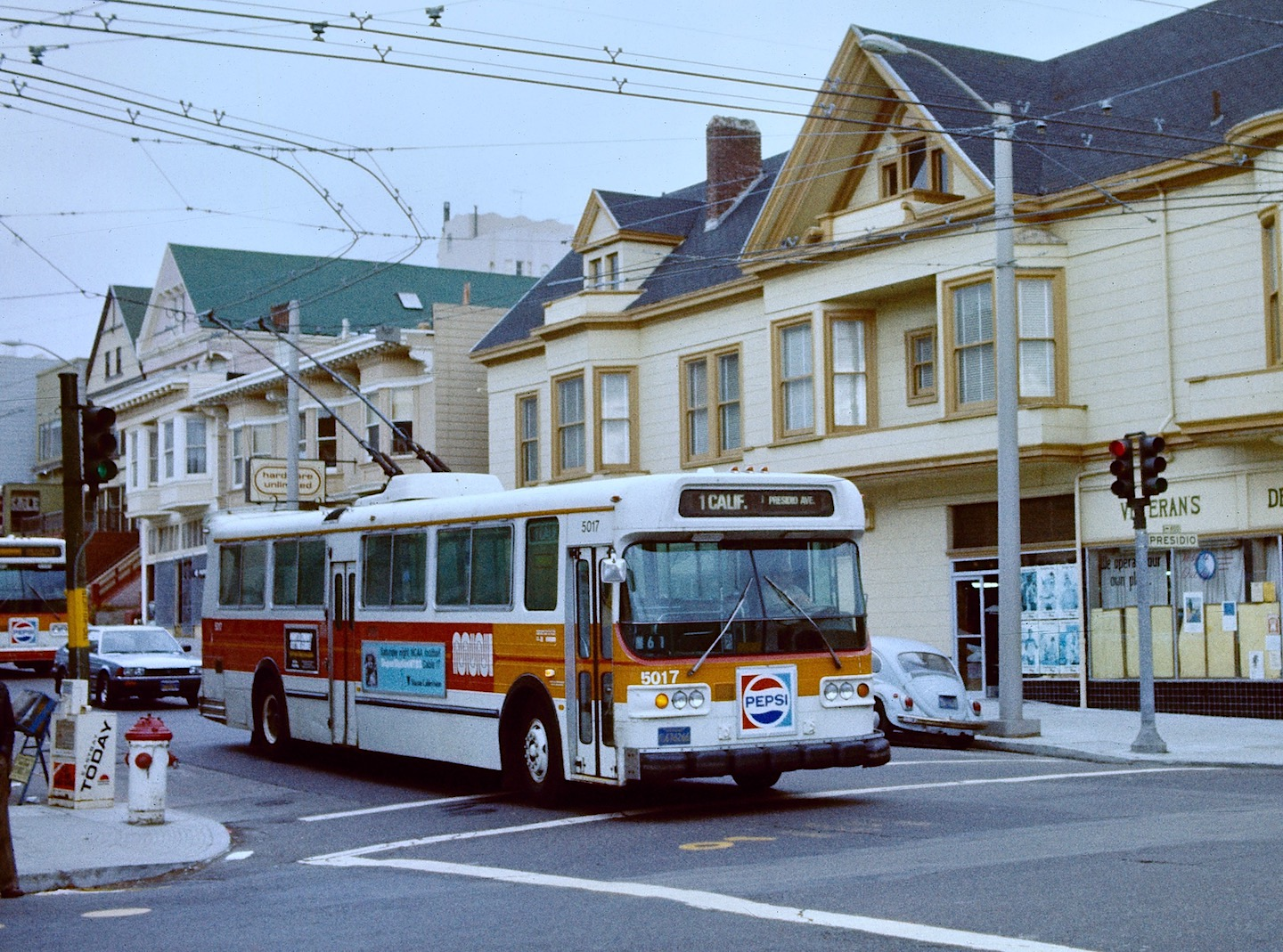
1 California trolleybus in 1982

Market Street Railway operated the 1 California streetcar between the Ferry Building and the Sunset on a route primarily via Sutter Street, California Street, Clement Street, and Geary Street.

The C Geary–California streetcar route was the third Muni line to open in 1913. It ran from ran from the Ferry Building along Market Street, Geary, 2nd Avenue, Cornwall, and California to 33rd Avenue. The route was cut short in 1950 to California and 2nd Avenue with the opening of the 1 California bus line, and was removed along with the B Geary on December 29, 1956.

The 1 California and 55 Sacramento were combined to form the current 1 California line on January 27, 1982.

During the COVID-19 pandemic, the 1 California's 1AX and 1BX express variants were suspended. Express service on California Street resumed with the revised 1X line on February 21, 2023.

Additional short turn service between Presidio Avenue and Drumm Street was added on June 10, 2023, and morning 1X service was increased from three to five trips. On February 1, 2025, morning 1X service was reduced back to three trips.

== In popular culture ==
Fictional "SFT" 1-California bus, as featured in Shang-Chi

A fictionalized version of the 1 California is featured in a chase scene in the 2021 Marvel film Shang-Chi and the Legend of the Ten Rings. In Shang-Chi, the titular protagonist and his best friend Katy are confronted on board a 1 California bus by Razor Fist and other members of the Ten Rings, who attempt to steal a pendant from Shang-Chi. As they fight, Razor Fist partially slices through the articulation joint of the articulated bus, disabling the brakes and sending the bus downhill through Nob Hill. The bus begins to split apart, while Shang-Chi fights the Ten Rings, and as Katy attempts to regain control of the bus. At a crucial moment, Shang-Chi pulls the stop request cord, signaling Katy to intentionally split the bus and leave Razor Fist behind in the back half. The front of the bus crashes into a row of parked cars outside Ghirardelli Square.

The 1 California bus in Shang-Chi featured the logos of the fictional "SFT" transit agency instead of the real Muni "worm" logo, as Muni did not want their brand associated with the destruction of the action sequence. Much of the scene was filmed in a studio in Australia, with exterior shots filming on location in San Francisco in October 2020. The route of the fictional 1 California was generally accurate, with modifications made to feature the Stockton Street Tunnel and Ghirardelli Square, neither of which are destinations on the real 1 California. The chase scene on the 1 California was well-received, with San Francisco Chronicle critic Peter Hartlaub describing it as the second-best San Francisco car chase scene of all time, second only to Bullitt (1968). Media coverage of the scene also highlighted a humorous exchange on Twitter between a San Francisco bus driver and Shang-Chi star Simu Liu, where Liu responded positively to a detailed critique of the scene's realism.
