= 41 Union =

Trolleybus line

Overview
- System: Muni trolleybus network
- Operator: San Francisco Municipal Railway
- Status: Service suspended
- Began service: 1970

Route
- Locale: San Francisco, California
- Start: Main and Howard
- End: Lyon and Greenwich
- Length: 3.5 miles (5.6 km)
- Other routes: 45 Union/Stockton
- Daily ridership: 3,500 (2019)
- Map: 41 Union Map

41 Union was a trolleybus line operated by the San Francisco Municipal Railway (Muni). It connected South of Market, the Financial District, Chinatown, North Beach, Russian Hill, and Cow Hollow.

== Route description ==
From the outbound terminus at Lyon and Greenwich, buses ran east on Union Street until Columbus Avenue where the route turned south. A short segment of the outbound route ran on Stockton Street turning between Columbus and Union. At the foot of Columbus, the route followed a complicated route on one-way streets to the inbound terminal at Main and Howard before returning to Columbus again on one-way streets.

== History ==
=== Presidio & Ferries Railway ===
The Presidio & Ferries Railway was an early streetcar company in San Francisco. The railway opened in December 1881 with three forms of motive power over their line: a cable railway, a horsecar, and a steam section.

Horsecars would begin the trip at the Ferry Building, taking riders to the corner of Columbus and Montgomery. The cable section ran along Columbus from Montgomery to Union, then west to Steiner. At Union and Steiner, steam trains initially took passengers farther west on Steiner, Greenwich, Baker, and to the Presidio of San Francisco. The cable line was extended in 1892 over new tracks on Union and Baker.

Following 1906 San Francisco earthquake, the line was converted to electric traction.

=== Municipal ownership ===
The city purchased the Presidio & Ferries Railway Union Street Line in 1913, as the route was one of four planned in anticipation of the 1915 Panama–Pacific International Exposition. The E Union opened as a streetcar route ten days before the fair, running from the Ferry Building to the Presidio via The Embarcadero, Washington/Jackson, Columbus, Union, Larkin, Vallejo, Franklin, Union, Baker and Greenwich into the Presidio.

Streetcar service was discontinued and the E Union was merged into the R Howard trolleybus line on July 20, 1947, becoming the E Union–Howard. It was re-designated the 41 Union/Howard in February 1949.

When Howard became a one-way street in 1970, the route was split in two, with the northern alignment retaining the 41 Union designation while the southern end became the 12 Folsom/Pacific. The 41 was reduced to rush-hour service on October 1, 1988. Services were indefinitely discontinued in 2020 amid the COVID-19 pandemic.
