= 3 Jackson =

Suspended San Francisco bus route

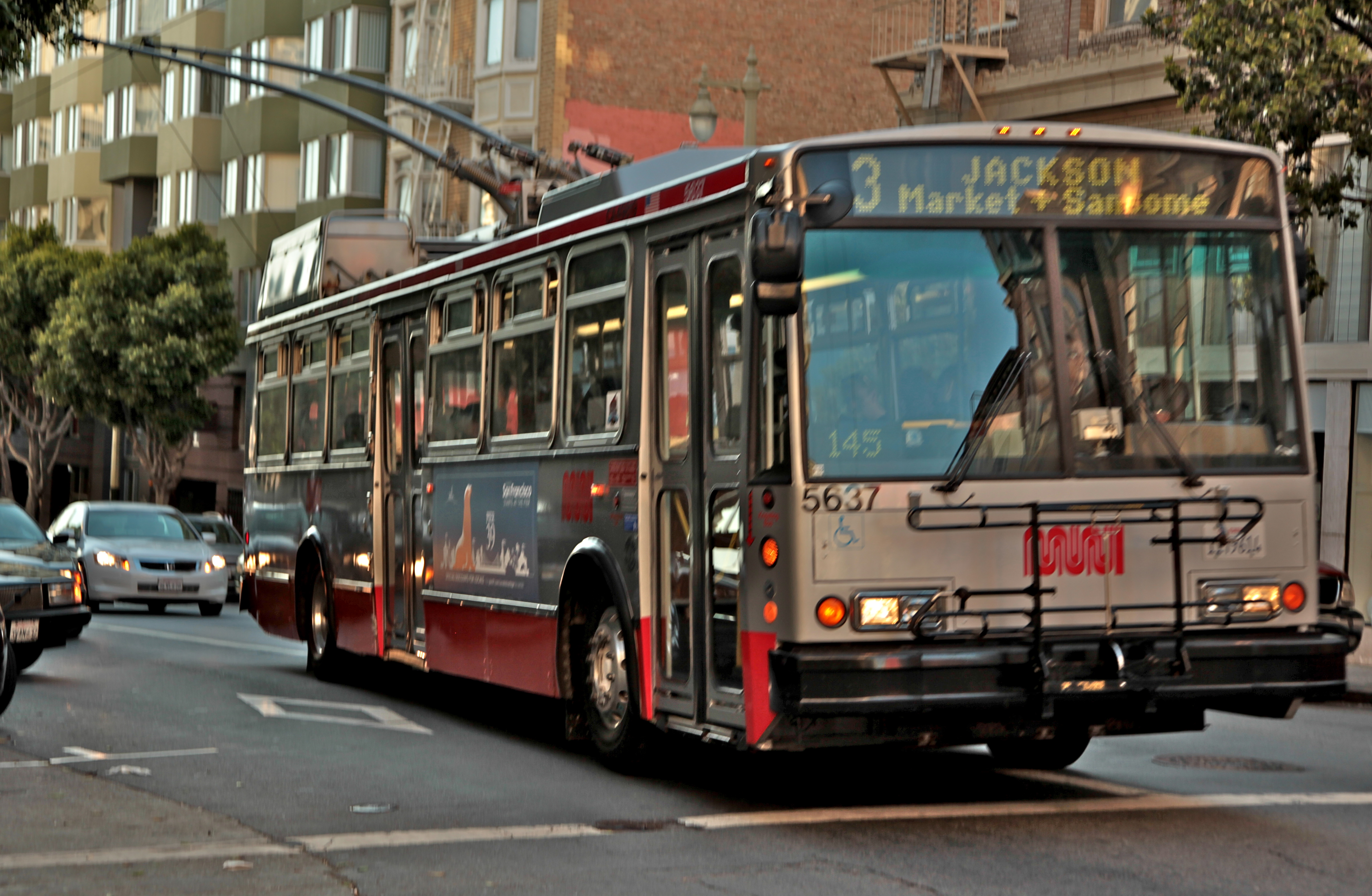
- 3 Jackson trolleybus, July 2012

Overview
- System: Muni trolleybus network
- Operator: San Francisco Municipal Railway
- Began service: July 3, 1949 (bus)

Route
- Locale: San Francisco, California
- Via: Jackson Street, Sutter Street
- Length: 3.4 miles (5.5 km)
- Daily ridership: 2,500 (2019)
- Map: 3 Jackson

3 Jackson is a suspended trolleybus line operated by the San Francisco Municipal Railway.

== Route description ==
From the outbound terminal at Presidio Avenue and California Street, buses looped around the block via Walnut and Sacramento back to Presidio and ran north to Jackson Street. The line turns on Jackson to Fillmore Street and ran south to Sutter Street. Outbound buses operated on Sutter from the inbound terminal at Sansome Street. Inbound buses turned off Sutter at Laguna then eastward on Post until Kearny and turning back via Bush and Sansome.

== History ==
The Sutter Street Railway was originally a horsecar line, opened in 1866, which was converted to cable car operation in 1877.

In 1902, the company was consolidated into United Railroads of San Francisco which later became the Market Street Railway. After 1909, the line was designated the 3 Sutter–Jackson. Muni took over the line in 1944. Streetcar service ended on July 3, 1949, with interim diesel bus service until the line was converted to trolleybus operation on January 21, 1951.

Service on the route was suspended effective April 8, 2020, in response to the COVID-19 pandemic and remains indefinitely suspended.
