= Fulton Street (San Francisco) =

Street in San Francisco, California, USA

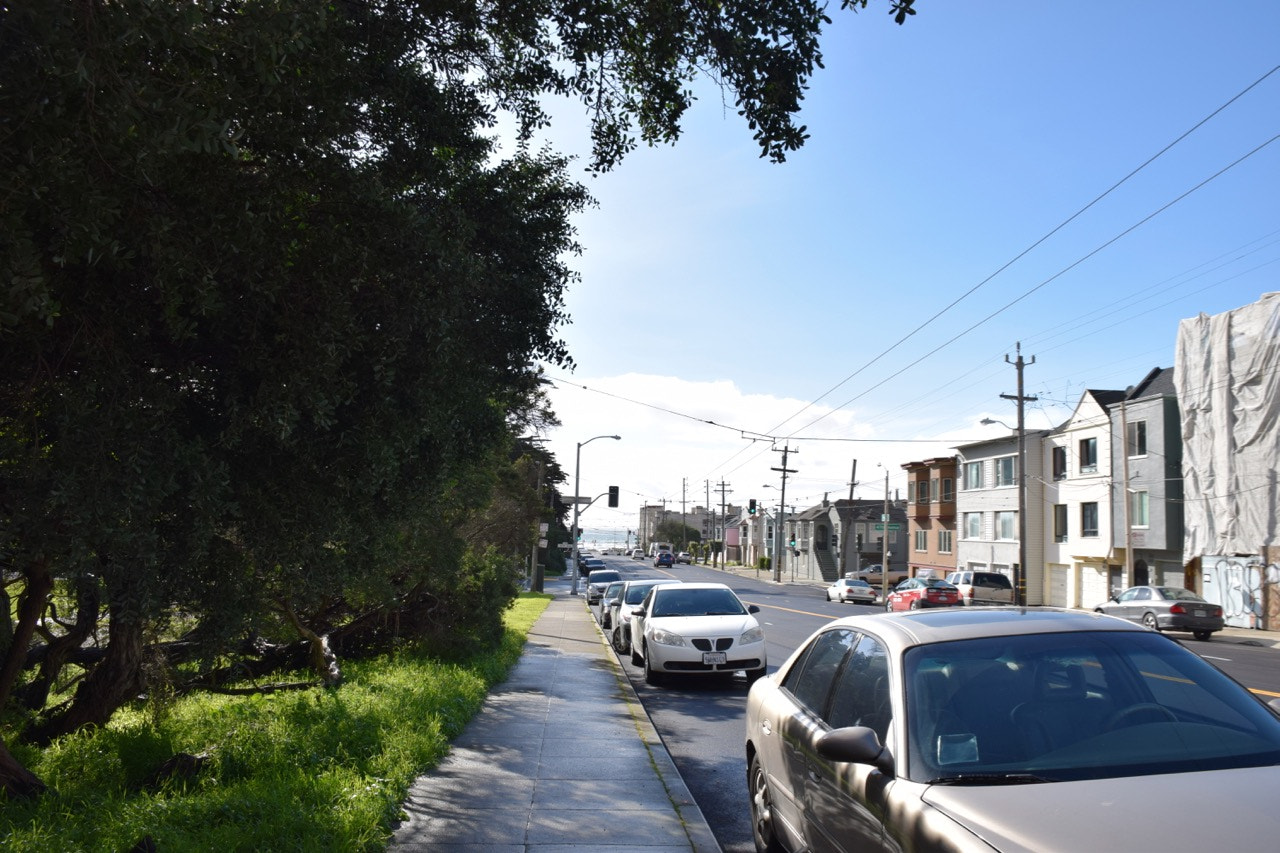
- Fulton Street facing west toward Ocean Beach
- Owner: City and County of San Francisco
- Maintained by: San Francisco DPW
- Location: San Francisco, California
- West end: Great Highway
- East end: Franklin Street

Fulton Street is an east–west street in San Francisco, California marking the northern side of the Golden Gate Park and the southern side of the Richmond District. It is named after Robert Fulton, the inventor of the steamship.

In the 1970s, Fulton Street gained fame as the home of the popular rock band Jefferson Airplane. The band named their album 2400 Fulton Street after the street address of their residence.

The street is also home to the African-American Art & Culture Complex and murals dedicated to the Black Lives Matter movement.
