= List of Muni Metro stations =

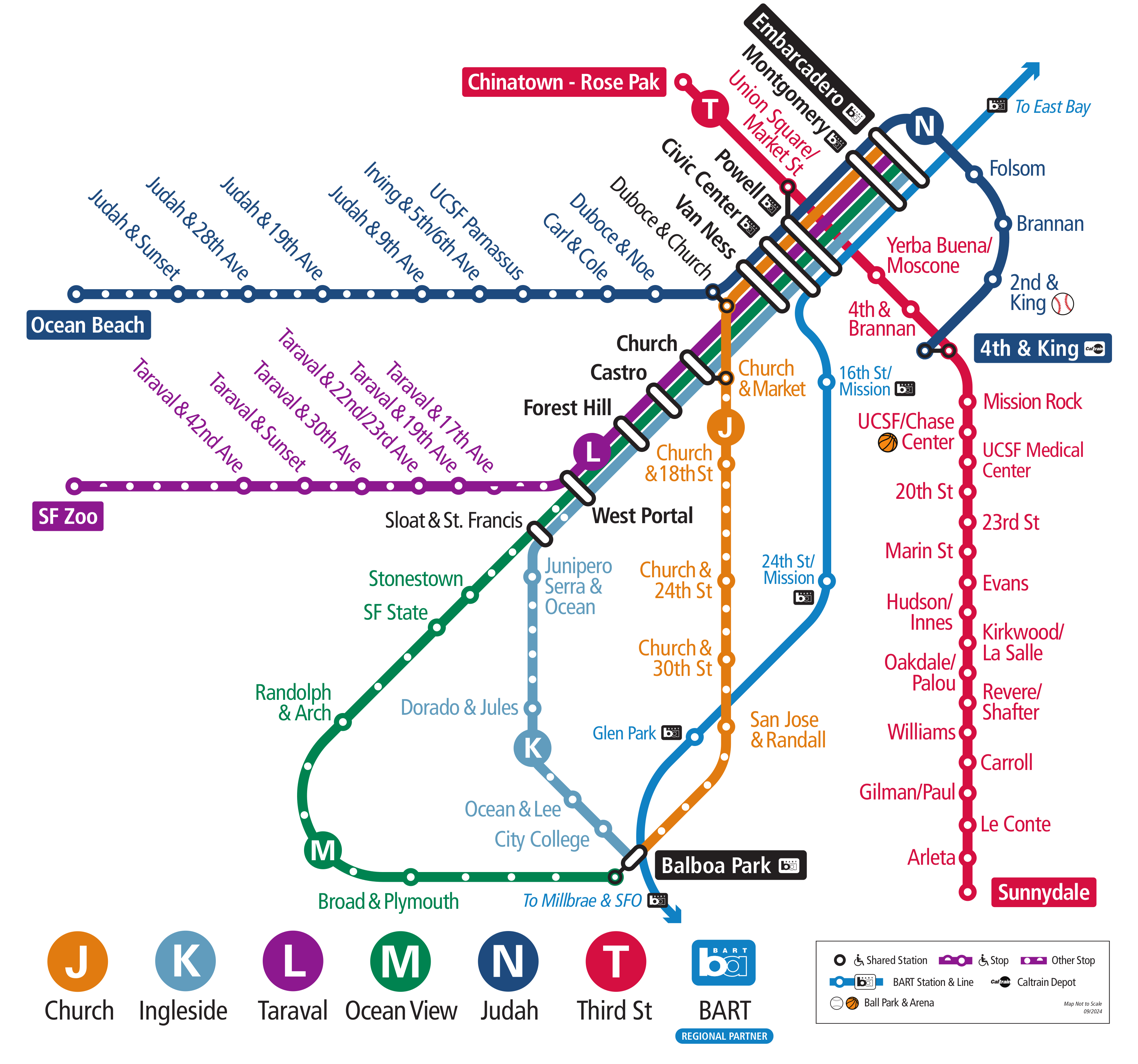
Muni Metro map accurate to September 2024 with accessible stops labeled: J Church; K Ingleside; L Taraval; M Ocean View; N Judah; T Third Street

Muni Metro is a light rail system serving San Francisco, California, United States. Operated by the San Francisco Municipal Railway (Muni), a part of the San Francisco Municipal Transportation Agency (SFMTA), Muni Metro served an average of 113,600 passengers per day in the first quarter of 2026, making it the fifth-busiest light rail system in the United States. Six services – J Church, K Ingleside, L Taraval, M Ocean View, N Judah, and T Third Street run on separate surface alignments and merge into a single downtown tunnel. The supplementary S Shuttle service operates within the tunnel. Muni Metro operates a fleet of 249 Siemens S200 LRVs.

The San Francisco Municipal Railway was created in 1909 and opened its first streetcar lines in 1912. Five of the current lines were added in the following decades: the J in 1917, the K (including the Twin Peaks Tunnel) in 1918, the L in 1919, the M in 1925, and the N in 1928. The other Municipal Railway streetcar lines, and those of the privately owned Market Street Railway, were converted to buses in the 1920s to 1950s, but these five lines were retained as streetcars because of their private rights of way. The system was converted to light rail, with larger US Standard Light Rail Vehicles, in the late 1970s and early 1980s. This included the opening of the Market Street subway as well as extension of three lines to Balboa Park station. An extension along The Embarcadero to the Caltrain terminal at 4th and King Street opened in 1998. The T Third Street line opened in 2007, serving the southeastern portion of the city. The Central Subway, with three new subway stations and one new surface station, opened on November 19, 2022.

The system has 115 stations, of which 67 (58%) are accessible. All twelve subway stations plus 25 surface stations have high-level platforms, 34-inch (860 mm) high, that allow for accessible level boarding at all doors. The other 78 stations have a mixture of low-level platforms on dedicated right-of-way, low-level boarding islands (platforms between the tracks and traffic lanes), sidewalk bulbs, and no platforms (where passengers cross parking or traffic lanes to board). Of those 78, 30 have "mini-high" platforms providing accessible boarding at a single door, while one has a wheelchair lift.

== Current stations ==
/	Transfer stations with BART / Caltrain
† /	Transfer stations with BART / Caltrain, and Line termini
†	Line termini

Station	Image	Line(s)	Service began	Platforms	Accessible	Notes
Embarcadero†	Embarcadero station, 2022	J Church K Ingleside L Taraval M Ocean View N Judah	February 18, 1980	High-level island platform (subway station)	Yes	
Montgomery	An inbound Muni Metro train at Montgomery station, 2018	J Church K Ingleside L Taraval M Ocean View N Judah	February 18, 1980	High-level island platform (subway station)	Yes	
Powell	An outbound S Shuttle train at Powell station, 2017	J Church K Ingleside L Taraval M Ocean View N Judah	February 18, 1980	High-level island platform (subway station)	Yes	Transfer to Union Square/Market Street station
Civic Center	An outbound J Church train, signed for a 30th and Church short turn, at Civic Center station, 2018	J Church K Ingleside L Taraval M Ocean View N Judah	February 18, 1980	High-level island platform (subway station)	Yes	
Van Ness	Muni 2006, the first Siemens S200 SF to enter revenue service, at Van Ness station, 2017	J Church K Ingleside L Taraval M Ocean View N Judah	February 18, 1980	High-level island platform (subway station)	Yes	Transfer to Van Ness Bus Rapid Transit
Church	Inbound T Third Street train at Church station, 2017	J Church (surface) K Ingleside L Taraval M Ocean View	June 11, 1980	High-level side platforms (subway station)	Yes	J Church stops on the surface at boarding islands with mini-high platforms at Church and Market / Church and 14th Street. The K, L, and M also used these boarding islands from 1972 to 1982.
Castro	An outbound S Shuttle train at Castro station, 2017	K Ingleside L Taraval M Ocean View	June 11, 1980	High-level side platforms (subway station)	Yes	
Forest Hill	Interior of Forest Hill station, looking in the outbound direction, 2014	K Ingleside L Taraval M Ocean View	February 3, 1918	High-level side platforms (subway station)	Yes	High-level platforms added in 1985
West Portal	An outbound M Ocean View train at West Portal station, 2018	K Ingleside L Taraval M Ocean View	February 3, 1918	High-level side platforms (subway station)	Yes	Originally a surface station outside the portal; converted to high-level platforms in 1980
Church and Duboce (J); Duboce and Church (N)	N Judah trains at Duboce and Church, 2018	J Church (inbound only) N Judah	October 21, 1928	Boarding islands with mini-high platforms	Yes	Also served by the K, L, and M from 1972 to 1982
Church and 16th Street	An outbound train at Church and 16th Street, 2017	J Church	August 11, 1917	Boarding islands	No	Also served by the K, L, and M from 1972 to 1982
Church and 18th Street	The inbound platform at Church and 18th Street station, 2018	J Church	August 11, 1917	Low-level side platform (inbound) and boarding island (outbound) with mini-high platforms	Yes	Partially inside Dolores Park
Right Of Way/20th Street	An outbound train at Right Of Way/20th Street, 2018	J Church	August 11, 1917	Low-level side platforms	No	Inside Dolores Park
Right Of Way/Liberty Street	An inbound train at Right Of Way/Liberty, 2018	J Church	August 11, 1917	None	No	
Right Of Way/21st Street	An inbound train at Right Of Way/21st Street, 2019	J Church	August 11, 1917	Low-level side platforms	No	
Church and 22nd Street	An inbound train at Church and 22nd Street, 2019	J Church	August 11, 1917	None	No	
Church and 24th Street	An inbound train at Church and 24th Street, 2019	J Church	August 11, 1917	Boarding islands with mini-high platforms	Yes	
Church and 26th Street	An outbound train at Church and Clipper, 2019	J Church	November 25, 2024	None	No	
Church and 28th Street	An outbound train viewed from the inbound boarding area at Church and 27th Street, 2019	J Church	November 25, 2024	None	No	
Church and 29th Street (inbound); Church and Day (outbound)	An inbound train at the mini-high platform at Church and 29th Street station, 2019	J Church	August 11, 1917	Boarding islands with mini-high platforms	Yes	
Church and 30th Street	An inbound train turning onto Church Street from 30th Street, 2019	J Church	August 11, 1917	None	No	Terminus of the line until 1991
30th Street and Dolores	An inbound train at 30th Street and Dolores, 2019	J Church	August 31, 1991	None	No	
San Jose and Randall	An inbound train at San Jose and Randall station, 2019	J Church	August 31, 1991	Low-level side platforms with mini-high platforms	Yes	
San Jose/Glen Park	An inbound train arrives at San Jose/Glen Park station, 2018	J Church	August 31, 1991	Low-level side platforms	No	Connection to BART at Glen Park station
San Jose and Santa Rosa	An inbound train at San Jose and Santa Rosa station, 2019	J Church	August 31, 1991	Boarding islands	No	
San Jose and Santa Ynez	An inbound train at San Jose and Santa Ynez station, 2019	J Church	August 31, 1991	Boarding islands	No	
San Jose and Ocean	An inbound train passing the outbound platform at San Jose and Ocean station, 2018	J Church	August 31, 1991	Boarding islands	No	K Ingleside stopped nearby from 1979 to 2015
Balboa Park †	K Ingleside train leaving the platform at Balboa Park station, 2018	J Church K Ingleside	April 23, 1979	High-level side platforms	Yes	Connection to M Ocean View at San Jose and Geneva
West Portal and 14th Avenue	An outbound train on West Portal Avenue at 14th Avenue, 2017	K Ingleside M Ocean View	February 3, 1918	Boarding islands	No	
St. Francis Circle	Mini-high platforms at St. Francis Circle station, 2017	K Ingleside M Ocean View	February 3, 1918	Boarding islands with mini-high platforms	Yes	
Junipero Serra and Ocean	An inbound train at Junipero Serra and Ocean station, 2018	K Ingleside	February 21, 1919	Boarding islands with mini-high platforms	Yes	
Ocean and San Leandro	An inbound train at Ocean and San Leandro, 2018	K Ingleside	February 21, 1919	Boarding islands	No	
Ocean and Aptos	Facing outbound at Ocean and Aptos station, 2018	K Ingleside	February 21, 1919	Boarding islands	No	
Ocean and Fairfield / Ocean and Victoria	An inbound train passes the outbound platform of Ocean and Victoria station, 2018	K Ingleside	February 21, 1919	Boarding islands	No	
Ocean and Dorado / Ocean and Jules	An outbound train approaches Ocean and Jules station, 2018	K Ingleside	February 21, 1919	Boarding islands with mini-high platforms	Yes	
Ocean and Miramar	An inbound train at Ocean and Miramar, 2018	K Ingleside	February 21, 1919	Boarding islands	No	
Ocean and Lee	An inbound train at Ocean and Lee station, 2018	K Ingleside	February 21, 1919	Boarding islands with mini-high platforms	Yes	
Ocean Avenue/CCSF Pedestrian Bridge	An outbound train at Ocean Avenue/CCSF Pedestrian Bridge station, 2018	K Ingleside	April 23, 1979	Boarding islands with mini-high platforms	Yes	
Ulloa and 14th Avenue	A train passing the future site of Ulloa and 14th Avenue station in February 2019	L Taraval	September 28, 2024	None	No	
15th Avenue and Taraval	An inbound train at 15th Avenue and Taraval, 2018	L Taraval (outbound only)	April 12, 1919	Bulb	No	Inbound stop closed on August 24, 2020
Taraval and 17th Avenue	An inbound train at Taraval and 17th Avenue, 2017	L Taraval (inbound only)	April 12, 1919	Boarding island with mini-high platform	Yes	Outbound stop closed on February 25, 2017
Taraval and 19th Avenue	An inbound train at Taraval and 19th Avenue, 2019	L Taraval	April 12, 1919	Boarding islands with mini-high platforms	Yes	
Taraval and 22nd Avenue / Taraval and 23rd Avenue	The inbound platform at Taraval and 22nd Avenue, 2018	L Taraval	April 12, 1919	Boarding islands with mini-high platforms	Yes	Consolidated from separate stops at 22nd Avenue and 23rd / 24th Avenues on February 25, 2017
Taraval and 26th Avenue	An inbound train crossing 26th Avenue, 2017	L Taraval	April 12, 1919	Boarding islands	No	
Taraval and 30th Avenue	An outbound train at Taraval and 30th Avenue, 2018	L Taraval	April 12, 1919	Boarding islands with mini-high platforms	Yes	
Taraval and 32nd Avenue	An outbound train at Taraval and 32nd Avenue, 2018	L Taraval	April 12, 1919	Boarding islands	No	
Taraval and Sunset	An outbound train at Taraval and Sunset, 2018	L Taraval	January 14, 1923	Boarding islands with mini-high platforms	Yes	
Taraval and 40th Avenue	The outbound painted clear zone at Taraval and 40th Avenue, 2018	L Taraval	January 14, 1923	Boarding islands	No	
Taraval and 42nd Avenue	An outbound train at Taraval and 42nd Avenue, 2018	L Taraval	January 14, 1923	Boarding islands with mini-high platforms	Yes	
Taraval and 44th Avenue	An outbound train at Taraval and 44th Avenue, 2018	L Taraval	January 14, 1923	Boarding islands	No	
46th Avenue and Taraval / Taraval and 46th Avenue	An inbound train at 46th Avenue and Taraval, 2018	L Taraval	January 14, 1923	Boarding island (inbound only)	No	
46th Avenue and Ulloa	An inbound train at 46th Avenue and Ulloa, 2018	L Taraval	September 15, 1937	None	No	
46th Avenue and Vicente	An outbound train at 46th Avenue and Vicente, 2018	L Taraval	September 15, 1937	None	No	
Wawona and 46th Avenue (San Francisco Zoo) †	A train at Wawona and 46th Avenue, 2018	L Taraval	September 15, 1937	Bulb with mini-high platform	Yes	
Right Of Way/Ocean	The northbound platform at Right Of Way/Ocean station, 2017	M Ocean View	October 6, 1925	Low-level side platforms	No	
Right Of Way/Eucalyptus	A northbound train passing the southbound platform at Right Of Way/Eucalyptus station, 2017	M Ocean View	October 6, 1925	Low-level side platforms	No	
Stonestown Galleria	Stonestown Galleria station, 2017	M Ocean View	October 6, 1925	High-level island platform	Yes	
San Francisco State University	San Francisco State University station, 2023	M Ocean View	October 6, 1925	High-level island platform	Yes	
19th Avenue and Junipero Serra / 19th Avenue and Randolph	A train at 19th Avenue and Junipero Serra, 2017	M Ocean View	October 6, 1925	None	No	
19th Avenue and Randolph	A train at 19th Avenue and Randolph, 2023	M Ocean View	October 6, 1925	None	No	
Randolph and Arch	A train at Randolph and Arch, 2019	M Ocean View	October 6, 1925	Bulbs with mini-high platforms	Yes	
Randolph and Bright	A train at Randolph and Bright, 2023	M Ocean View	October 6, 1925	None	No	
Broad and Orizaba / Orizaba and Broad	Outbound train at Orizaba and Broad, 2023	M Ocean View	October 6, 1925	None	No	
Broad and Capitol	A train at Broad and Capitol, 2023	M Ocean View	October 6, 1925	None	No	
Broad and Plymouth	A train at Broad and Plymouth, 2023	M Ocean View	October 6, 1925	Bulbs with mini-high platforms	Yes	
San Jose and Farallones	A train at San Jose and Farallones, 2023	M Ocean View	August 30, 1980	Boarding islands	No	
San Jose and Lakeview	A train at San Jose and Lakeview, 2023	M Ocean View	August 30, 1980	Boarding islands	No	
San Jose and Geneva (Balboa Park)	Passengers board a train at San Jose and Geneva, 2018	M Ocean View	August 30, 1980	Boarding island with lift (inbound)	Yes	Connection to J Church, K Ingleside, and BART at Balboa Park
Duboce and Noe	A train at Duboce and Noe station, 2018	N Judah	October 21, 1928	Side platforms with mini-high platforms	Yes	
Carl and Cole	A train at Carl and Cole station, 2017	N Judah	October 21, 1928	Bulbs with mini-high platforms	Yes	
Carl and Stanyan	A train at Carl and Stanyan, 2017	N Judah	October 21, 1928	Bulb (inbound)	No	
Carl and Hillway	A train at Carl and Hillway, 2018	N Judah	October 21, 1928	None	No	
Irving and Arguello / Irving and 2nd Avenue	Passengers boarding a train at Irving and Arguello, 2017	N Judah	October 21, 1928	Bulbs with mini-high platforms	Yes	
Irving and 5th Avenue / Irving and 6th Avenue	A train at Irving and 5th Avenue, 2022	N Judah	August 22, 2020	Bulbs with mini-high platforms	Yes	Replaced former stops at 4th Avenue and 7th Avenue
Irving and 8th Avenue / 9th Avenue and Irving	A train at 9th Avenue and Irving, 2019	N Judah	October 21, 1928	Bulbs	No	
Judah and 9th Avenue	A train at Judah and 9th Avenue station, 2017	N Judah	October 21, 1928	Boarding islands with mini-high platforms	Yes	
Judah and 12th Avenue	A train at Judah and 12th Avenue, 2019	N Judah	October 21, 1928	Boarding islands	No	
Judah and Funston	A train at Judah and Funston, 2017	N Judah	October 21, 1928	None	No	
Judah and 15th Avenue / Judah and 16th Avenue	A train at Judah and 16th Avenue, 2019	N Judah	October 21, 1928	Boarding islands	No	
Judah and 19th Avenue	A train at Judah and 19th Avenue, 2017	N Judah	October 21, 1928	Boarding islands with mini-high platforms	Yes	
Judah and 22nd Avenue / Judah and 23rd Avenue	A train at Judah and 23rd Avenue, 2018	N Judah	October 21, 1928	Boarding islands	No	
Judah and 25th Avenue	A train at Judah and 25th Avenue, 2019	N Judah	October 21, 1928	Boarding islands	No	
Judah and 28th Avenue	A train at Judah and 28th Avenue, 2018	N Judah	October 21, 1928	Boarding islands with mini-high platforms	Yes	
Judah and 31st Avenue	A train at Judah and 31th Avenue, 2019	N Judah	October 21, 1928	Boarding islands	No	
Judah and 34th Avenue	A train at Judah and 34th Avenue, 2017	N Judah	October 21, 1928	Boarding islands	No	
Judah and Sunset	A train at Judah and Sunset, 2018	N Judah	October 21, 1928	Boarding islands with mini-high platforms	Yes	
Judah and 40th Avenue	Judah and 40th Avenue, 2018	N Judah	October 21, 1928	Boarding islands	No	
Judah and 43rd Avenue	A train at Judah and 43rd Avenue, 2018	N Judah	October 21, 1928	Boarding islands	No	
Judah and 46th Avenue	A train passes the outbound platform at Judah and 46th Avenue station, 2018	N Judah	October 21, 1928	Boarding islands	No	
Judah and La Playa (Ocean Beach) †	A train at Judah and La Playa, 2019	N Judah	October 21, 1928	Mini-high platform only	Yes	
The Embarcadero and Folsom	The Embarcadero and Folsom station, 2017	N Judah	January 10, 1998	High-level island platform	Yes	
The Embarcadero and Brannan	Two trains at The Embarcadero and Brannan station, 2012	N Judah	January 10, 1998	High-level island platform	Yes	
2nd and King	A train at 2nd and King station, 2019	N Judah	January 10, 1998	High-level island platform	Yes	
4th and King †	N Judah trains at 4th and King station, 2018	N Judah T Third Street	January 10, 1998	High-level island platforms	Yes	N Judah and T Third Street use separate platforms
Chinatown†	Train at Chinatown station, 2022	T Third Street	November 19, 2022	High-level island platform (subway station)	Yes	
Union Square/Market Street	A northbound test train at Union Square/Market Street station during a public viewing event, four days before revenue service began in November 2022	T Third Street	November 19, 2022	High-level island platform (subway station)	Yes	Transfer to other Muni Metro lines and BART at Powell station
Yerba Buena/Moscone	A train at Yerba Buena/Moscone station, 2022	T Third Street	November 19, 2022	High-level island platform (subway station)	Yes	
4th and Brannan	A train at 4th and Brannan station, 2022	T Third Street	November 19, 2022	High-level island platform	Yes	
Mission Rock	A southbound train at Mission Rock station, 2018	T Third Street	January 13, 2007	High-level side platforms	Yes	
UCSF/Chase Center	A southbound train at UCSF/Chase Center station, 2019	T Third Street	January 13, 2007	High-level island platform	Yes	
UCSF Medical Center	The northbound platform at UCSF Medical Center station, 2018	T Third Street	January 13, 2007	High-level side platforms	Yes	
20th Street	A northbound train at 20th Street station, 2018	T Third Street	January 13, 2007	High-level side platforms	Yes	
23rd Street	A northbound train at 23rd Street station, 2017	T Third Street	January 13, 2007	High-level side platforms	Yes	
Marin Street	A northbound train at Marin Street station, 2019	T Third Street	January 13, 2007	High-level side platforms	Yes	
Evans	The southbound platform at Evans station, 2018	T Third Street	January 13, 2007	High-level side platforms	Yes	
Hudson/Innes	Two trains at Hudson/Innes station, 2018	T Third Street	January 13, 2007	High-level island platform	Yes	
Kirkwood/La Salle	Kirkwood/La Salle station, 2018	T Third Street	January 13, 2007	High-level island platform	Yes	
Oakdale/Palou	A southbound train at Oakdale/Palou station, 2018	T Third Street	January 13, 2007	High-level island platform	Yes	
Revere/Shafter	A southbound train at Revere/Shafter station, 2019	T Third Street	January 13, 2007	High-level island platform	Yes	
Williams	A northbound train at Williams station, 2017	T Third Street	January 13, 2007	High-level side platforms	Yes	
Carroll	A northbound train at Carroll station, 2020	T Third Street	January 13, 2007	High-level side platforms	Yes	
Gilman/Paul	The outbound platform at Gilman/Paul station, 2020	T Third Street	January 13, 2007	High-level side platforms	Yes	
Le Conte	Trains at Le Conte station, 2021	T Third Street	January 13, 2007	High-level island platform	Yes	
Arleta	Arleta Station, 2007	T Third Street	January 13, 2007	High-level island platform	Yes	
Sunnydale †	Sunnydale station, 2017	T Third Street	January 13, 2007	High-level island platform	Yes	

== Former stations ==
Prior to the late 1970s, there was a higher density of stops on the surface streetcar lines. Many of these stops were closed as the conversion to Muni Metro introduced longer trains and a desire for higher surface speeds. Most were had no infrastructure other than marked poles at street corners; several on the M Ocean View had small platforms. A number of stops on Market Street were closed when the Market Street subway opened; most are now served by the F Market & Wharves streetcar. Four stations with significant infrastructure were closed during conversion:

Station	Image	Line(s)	Service ended	Platforms	Notes
Church and 19th Street	The former platforms of Church and 19th Street	J Church	c. 1980	Low-level side platforms	Inside Dolores Park
Eureka Valley	The remains of the inbound side of the former Eureka Valley station, 2015	K Ingleside L Taraval M Ocean View	1972	Low-level side platforms (subway station)	
Phelan Loop †	Muni trolleybuses at Phelan Loop, circa 2002	K Ingleside	March 17, 1981	Low-level side platform	Replaced by Ocean and Lee
Transbay Terminal †	A 2008 view of the facade of the now-demolished Transbay Transit Terminal	J Church K Ingleside L Taraval M Ocean View N Judah	September 20, 1982	Low-level side platforms	Streetcar loop on the north side of the terminal, separate from the elevated bus loops formerly used by Transbay trains

Several surface stops have closed during the Muni Metro era during station consolidation projects.

Station	Image	Line(s)	Service ended	Platforms	Notes
Irving and 4th Avenue	A train at Irving and 4th Avenue, 2018	N Judah	March 30, 2020	None	Consolidated into Irving and 5th Avenue / Irving and 6th Avenue
Irving and 7th Avenue	A train at the former Irving and 7th Avenue stop, 2019	N Judah	March 30, 2020	None	Consolidated into Irving and 5th Avenue / Irving and 6th Avenue
Ocean and Westgate / Ocean and Cerritos	The inbound platform at Ocean and Westgate, 2018	K Ingleside	September 28, 2024	Boarding islands	
San Jose and Mount Vernon	A train at San Jose and Mount Vernon, 2023	M Ocean View	September 28, 2024	Boarding islands	
Taraval and 28th Avenue	Closure notice at the former Taraval and 28th Avenue stop, 2017	L Taraval	February 25, 2017	None	
Taraval and 35th Avenue	A train at Taraval and 35th Avenue, 2018	L Taraval	February 10, 2018	None	
Ulloa and 15th Avenue	A train on 15th Avenue turning onto Ulloa Street, 2017	L Taraval	February 25, 2017	None	Consolidated into Ulloa and 14th Avenue
Ulloa and Forest Side	An outbound train at Ulloa Street and Forest Side Avenue, 2017	L Taraval	August 24, 2020	None	Consolidated into Ulloa and 14th Avenue
