= 42nd Avenue station =

42nd Avenue station could refer to:

- Hollywood/Northeast 42nd Avenue station
- Taraval and 42nd Avenue station
