= Ocean and Westgate / Ocean and Cerritos stations =

Former light rail stops in San Francisco, California

Ocean and Westgate Ocean and Cerritos
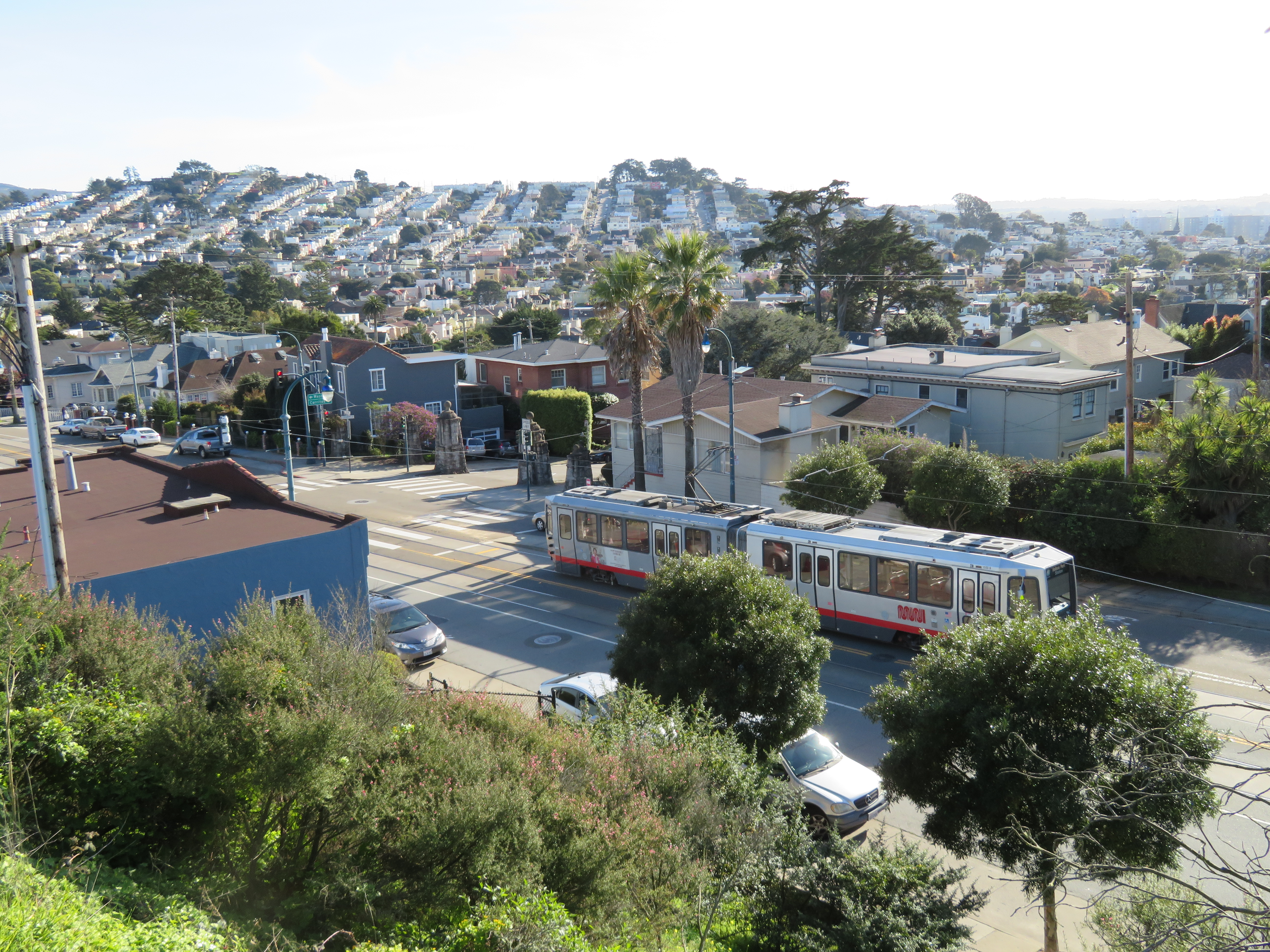
- An outbound train at Ocean and Cerritos in January 2018

General information
- Location: Ocean Avenue at Westgate Drive and Cerritos Avenue; San Francisco, California
- Coordinates: 37°43′38″N 122°28′00″W
- Platforms: 2 side platforms
- Tracks: 2

Construction
- Accessible: No

History
- Opened: c. 1896
- Closed: September 28, 2024
- Rebuilt: 2001–2003

Services
Preceding station	Muni	Following station
Ocean and Aptos toward Embarcadero	K Ingleside	Ocean and Fairfield/Victoria toward Balboa Park
Location

Ocean and Westgate (inbound) and Ocean and Cerritos (outbound) were a pair of one-way light rail stops on the Muni Metro K Ingleside line, located between the Mount Davidson and Ingleside Terrace neighborhoods of San Francisco, California. The stops consisted of one side platform each, with the eastbound (outbound) platform located on Ocean Avenue west of the intersection with Westgate Drive and Cerritos Avenue, and the westbound (inbound) platform located east of the intersection. They originally opened around 1896 on the United Railroads 12 line; K Ingleside service began in 1919. The stops were closed on September 28, 2024.

== History ==
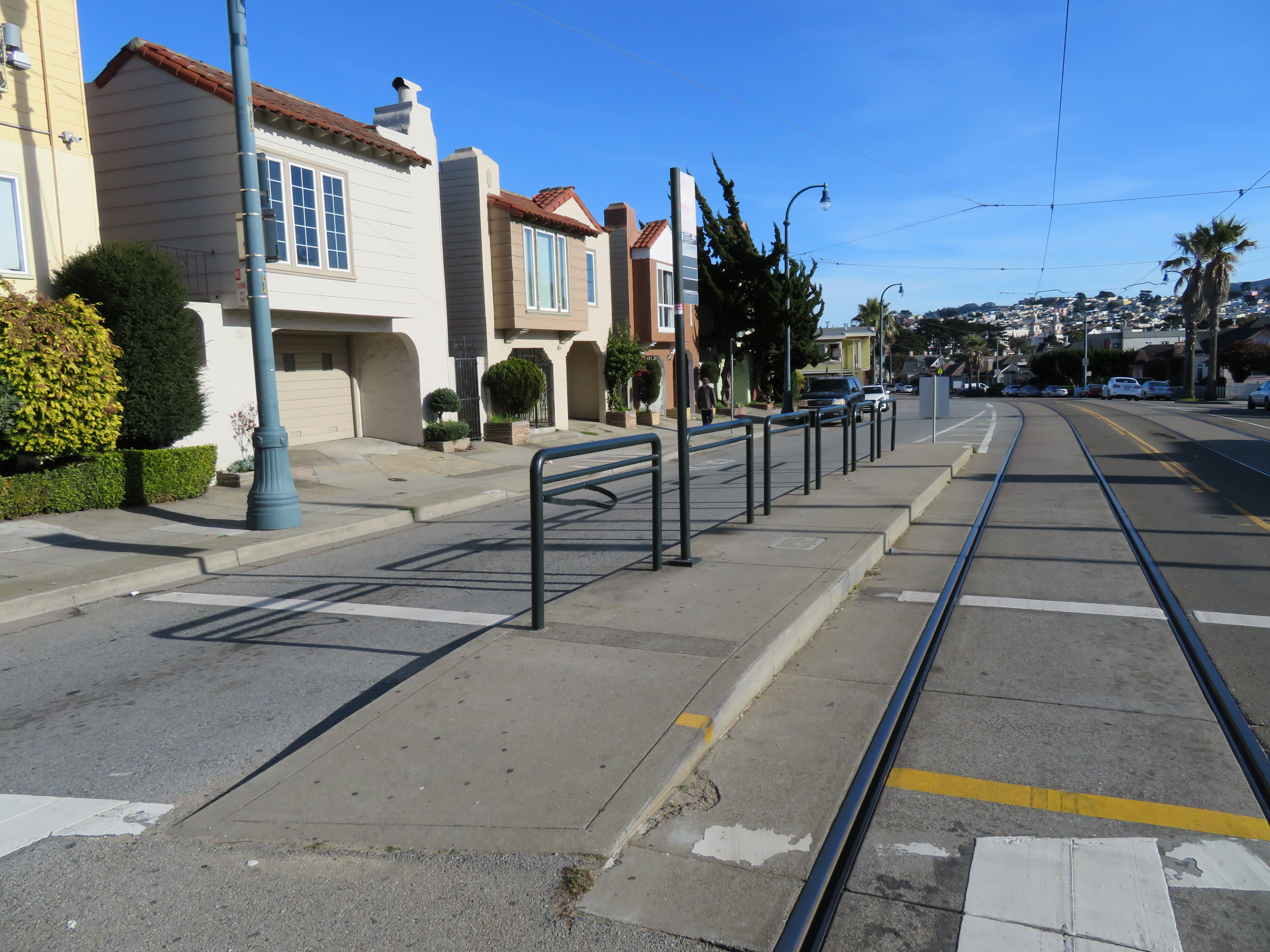
The inbound platform at Ocean and Westgate in 2018

The private Market Street Railway opened a branch – built in just six days – of its Mission Street line along Ocean Avenue to Victoria Street on December 4, 1895, to serve the new Ingleside Racetrack. The line was extended through less populated areas to the Ingleside House (where Ocean Avenue now meets Junipero Serra Boulevard) shortly thereafter. The 1906 earthquake damaged many cable car and streetcar lines; the URR resumed service on the Ocean Avenue (12) line on May 6, 1906.

On November 25, 1918, the city and the struggling URR signed the "Parkside Agreements", which allowed Muni streetcars to use URR trackage on Junipero Serra Boulevard, Ocean Avenue, and Taraval Street, in exchange for a cash payment and shared maintenance costs. The K Ingleside line was extended south on Junipero Serra Boulevard and east on Ocean to Ocean and Miramar on February 21, 1919. The city purchased the private company (renamed Market Street Railway in 1921) in 1944; route 12 service was removed from Ocean Avenue on April 8, 1945, leaving just the K Ingleside.

The line was closed and replaced by buses from February 2001 to June 7, 2003, for the Ocean Avenue Reconstruction and Improvement Project, a major street repaving and utility replacement project. Muni boarding islands were reconstructed at the stations along Ocean Avenue.

In 2023, the SFMTA began planning work on the K Ingleside Rapid Project, which was intended to increase capacity and reduce travel time on the Ocean Avenue portion of the line. An initial proposal shown in April 2023 called for Westgate / Cerritos to be closed due to its close proximity to the Aptos stop. Updated proposals in July 2023 and January 2023 also included the stop closure. It also had the lowest ridership of the stops on the corridor. The project was approved by the SFMTA board on March 5, 2024. The station was closed on September 28, 2024.
