= San Jose and Mount Vernon station =

Light rail stop in San Francisco, California, US

San Jose and Mount Vernon
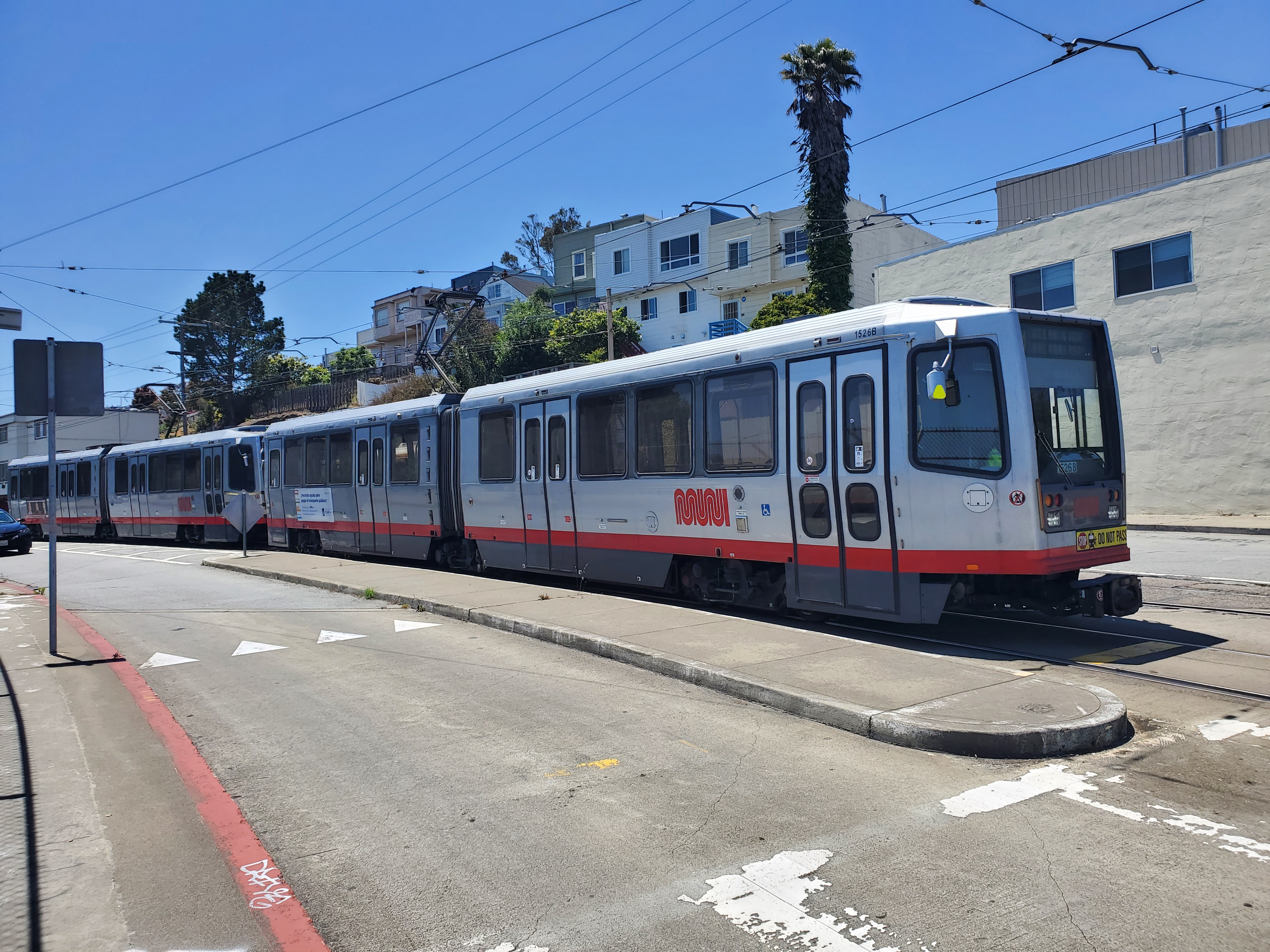
- An outbound train at San Jose and Mount Vernon in July 2023

General information
- Location: San Jose Avenue at Mount Vernon Avenue; San Francisco, California
- Coordinates: 37.71837°N 122.44869°W
- Platforms: 2 side platforms
- Tracks: 2

Construction
- Accessible: No

History
- Opened: August 30, 1980
- Closed: September 28, 2024

Services
Preceding station	Muni	Following station
San Jose and Lakeview toward Embarcadero	M Ocean View	San Jose and Geneva (Balboa Park) Terminus
Location

San Jose and Mount Vernon station was a light rail stop on the Muni Metro M Ocean View line, located in the Ingleside neighborhood of San Francisco, California. The station had two side platforms (traffic islands) in the middle of San Jose Avenue; the inbound platform is located on a bridge over Interstate 280. The platforms were not accessible.

The station opened with the extension of the line to Balboa Park station on August 30, 1980. In 2022, the SFMTA begin planning the M Ocean View Transit and Safety Project, a MuniForward project intended to improve reliability of the segment between Junipero Serra Boulevard and Balboa Park station. Initial proposals released that September called for the platforms at Mount Vernon to be extended. A revised proposal in May 2023, however, called for the stop to be closed. The station closed on September 28, 2024, along with the Ocean and Westgate / Ocean and Cerritos stations on the K Ingleside.
