= 46th Avenue and Taraval / Taraval and 46th Avenue stations =

Muni Metro light rail stops in San Francisco

46th Avenue and Taraval Taraval and 46th Avenue
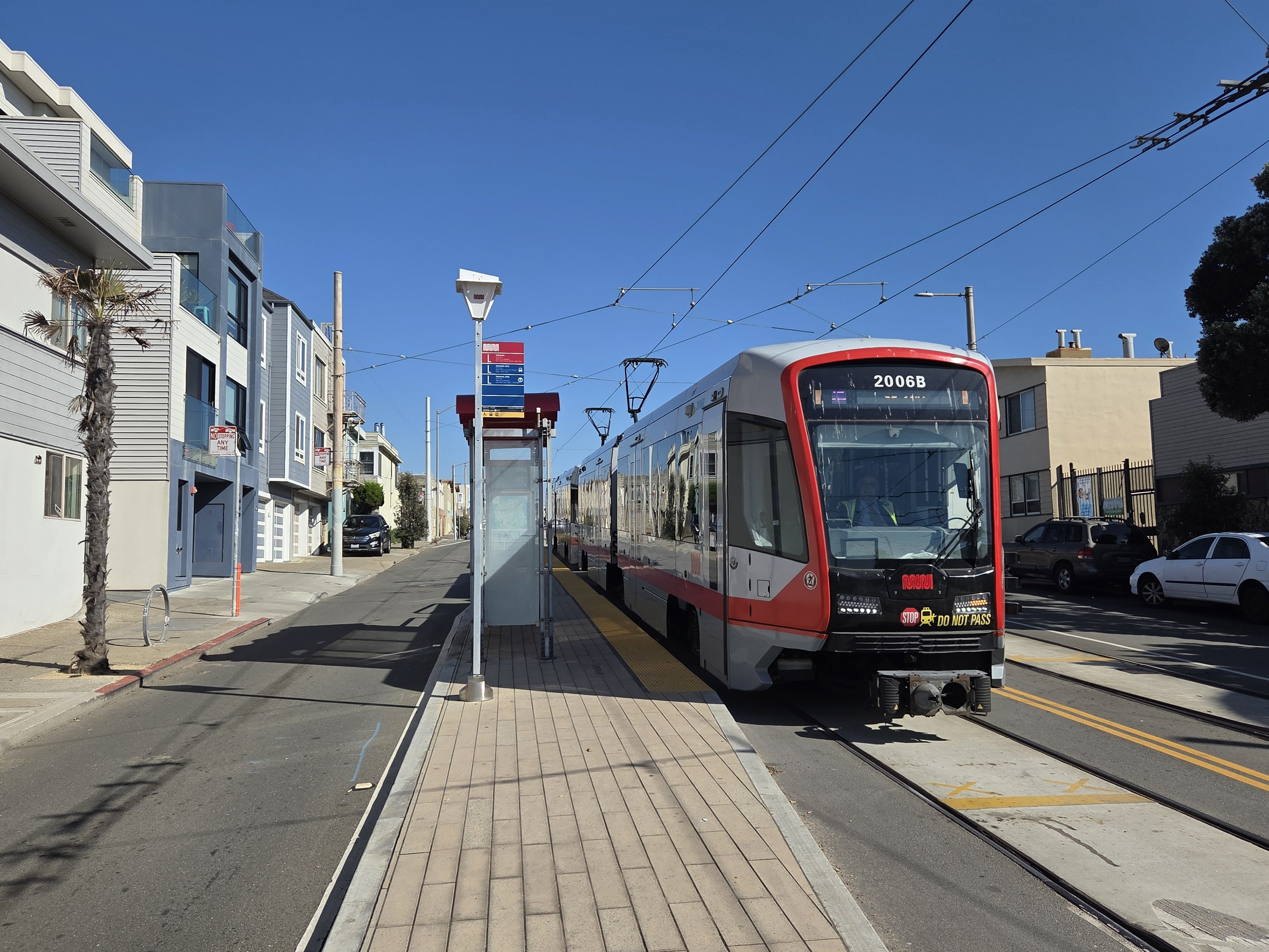
- An outbound train at Taraval and 46th Avenue in 2025

General information
- Location: Taraval Street and 46th Avenue; San Francisco, California
- Coordinates: 37.74177°N 122.50463°W
- Platforms: 1 side platform (westbound)
- Tracks: 2
- Connections: Muni: 18

Construction
- Accessible: No

History
- Opened: January 14, 1923
- Rebuilt: 2019–2021 (westbound)

Services
Preceding station	Muni	Following station
46th Avenue and Ulloa toward SF Zoo	L Taraval	Taraval and 44th Avenue toward Embarcadero
Location

46th Avenue and Taraval (eastbound) and Taraval and 46th Avenue (westbound) are a pair of one-way light rail stops on the Muni Metro L Taraval line, located in the Parkside neighborhood of San Francisco, California.

== Service ==
In August 2020, service along the route was replaced by buses to allow for the construction of improvements to the L Taraval line. The project was finished on September 28, 2024, and train service along the line resumed on that day.

The stop is also served by the route 18 bus, plus the L Bus and L Owl bus routes, which provide service along the L Taraval line during the early morning and late night hours respectively when trains do not operate.

== History ==
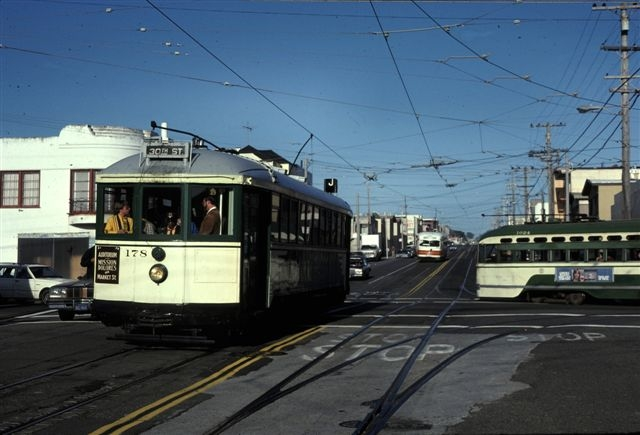
A historic streetcar on the tail tracks during an excursion in 1982

The station opened with the second section of the L Taraval line – an extension to 48th Avenue – on January 14, 1923. In 1937, a southern extension to Wawona and 46th Avenue was opened; the tracks west of 46th Avenue were then removed from revenue service, though they are still used for occasional vehicle storage, usually for accessible vehicles.

=== Reconstruction ===
Like many stations on the line, Taraval and 46th Avenue had no platforms; trains stopped at marked poles before the cross street, and passengers crossed travel lanes on Taraval to board inbound trains. In March 2014, Muni released details of the proposed implementation of their Transit Effectiveness Project (later rebranded MuniForward), which included a variety of stop changes for the L Taraval line, but did not propose changes at 46th Avenue. On September 20, 2016, the SFMTA Board approved the L Taraval Rapid Project. Contrary to the original plan, a westbound boarding island will be built at 46th Avenue.

Construction on the first phase of the project, between 33rd Avenue and 46th Avenue, began in September 2019. When Muni Metro service resumed on August 22, 2020, after a five-month closure during the COVID-19 pandemic, L Taraval service remained suspended west of Sunset Boulevard for construction. Rail service was re-replaced with buses on August 25 due to issues with malfunctioning overhead wire splices and the need to quarantine control center staff after a COVID-19 case. Construction of the westbound platform began on January 22, 2021. The first phase of the project, including the platform at 46th Avenue, was completed in July 2021.
