= Taraval and 19th Avenue station =

Muni Metro light rail stop in San Francisco

Taraval and 19th Avenue
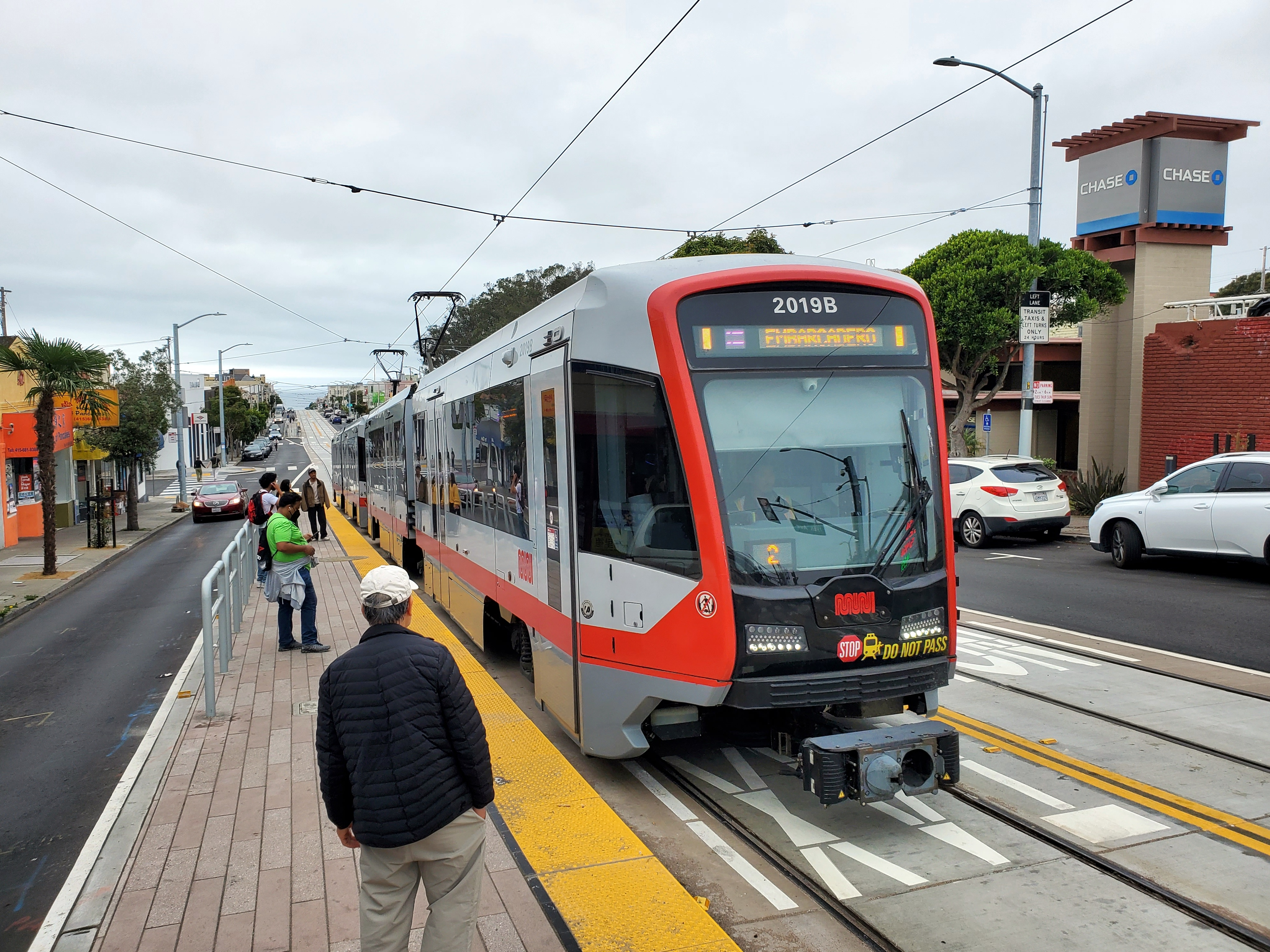
- An eastbound train at Taraval and 19th Avenue in 2024

General information
- Location: Taraval Street at 19th Avenue; San Francisco, California
- Coordinates: 37.74303°N 122.47566°W
- Platforms: 2 side platforms
- Tracks: 2
- Connections: Muni: 28, 28R, 91 Owl

Construction
- Accessible: Yes

History
- Opened: April 12, 1919
- Rebuilt: 2019, 2022–2024

Services
Preceding station	Muni	Following station
Taraval and 22nd/23rd Avenues toward SF Zoo	L Taraval	Taraval and 17th Avenue toward Embarcadero
Taraval and 22nd/23rd Avenues toward SF Zoo	L Taraval	15th Avenue and Taraval One-way operation
Location

Taraval and 19th Avenue station is a light rail stop on the Muni Metro L Taraval line, located in the Parkside neighborhood of San Francisco, California. The stop opened with the first section of the L Taraval line on April 12, 1919.

== Reconstruction ==
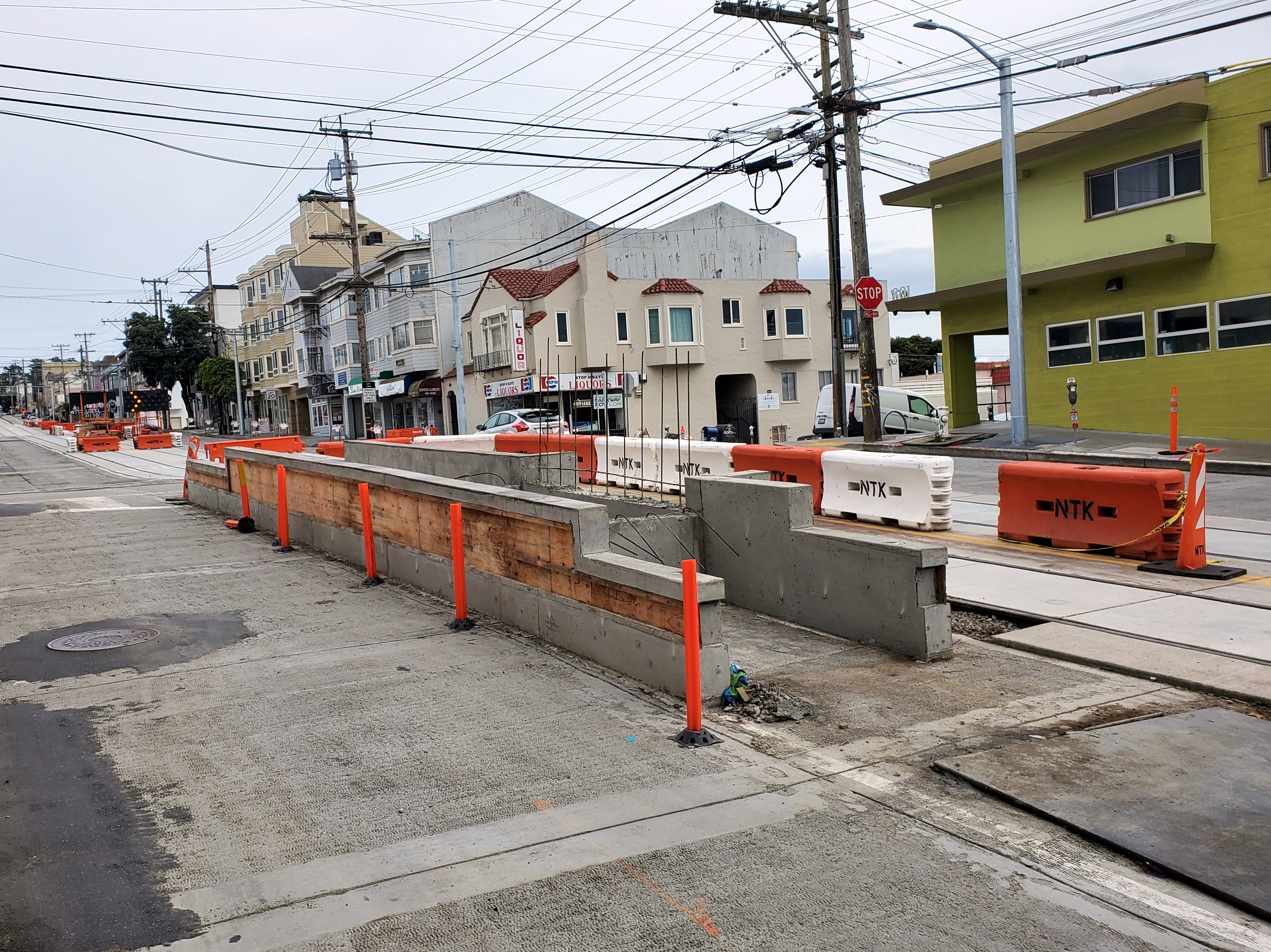
The outbound accessible platform under construction in February 2024

Like many stations on the line, 19th Avenue originally had no platforms; trains stopped at marked poles before the cross street, and passengers crossed travel lanes to board. In March 2014, Muni released details of the proposed implementation of their Transit Effectiveness Project (later rebranded MuniForward), which included a variety of stop changes for the L Taraval line. Boarding islands would be built between 19th Avenue and 18th Avenue.

On September 20, 2016, the SFMTA Board approved the L Taraval Rapid Project. Construction was to occur from 2018 to 2020. Boarding islands with accessible platforms would be built; the inbound platform would remain west of 19th Avenue, with the outbound platform to the east. As an interim measure, painted clear zones were added in both directions in January 2017. The clear zones gave passengers a safe place to alight from trains before crossing the travel lane. Concrete platforms were added in early 2019.

On March 30, 2020, all Muni Metro service was replaced with buses due to the COVID-19 pandemic. Muni Metro rail service returned on August 22, 2020, but was replaced again by buses on August 25. Construction on Segment B of the project, between West Portal and Sunset Boulevard, began in January 2022 and was completed in mid-2024. L Taraval rail service resumed on September 28, 2024.
