= Taraval and 22nd Avenue / Taraval and 23rd Avenue stations =

Muni Metro light rail stops in San Francisco

Taraval and 22nd Avenue Taraval and 23rd Avenue
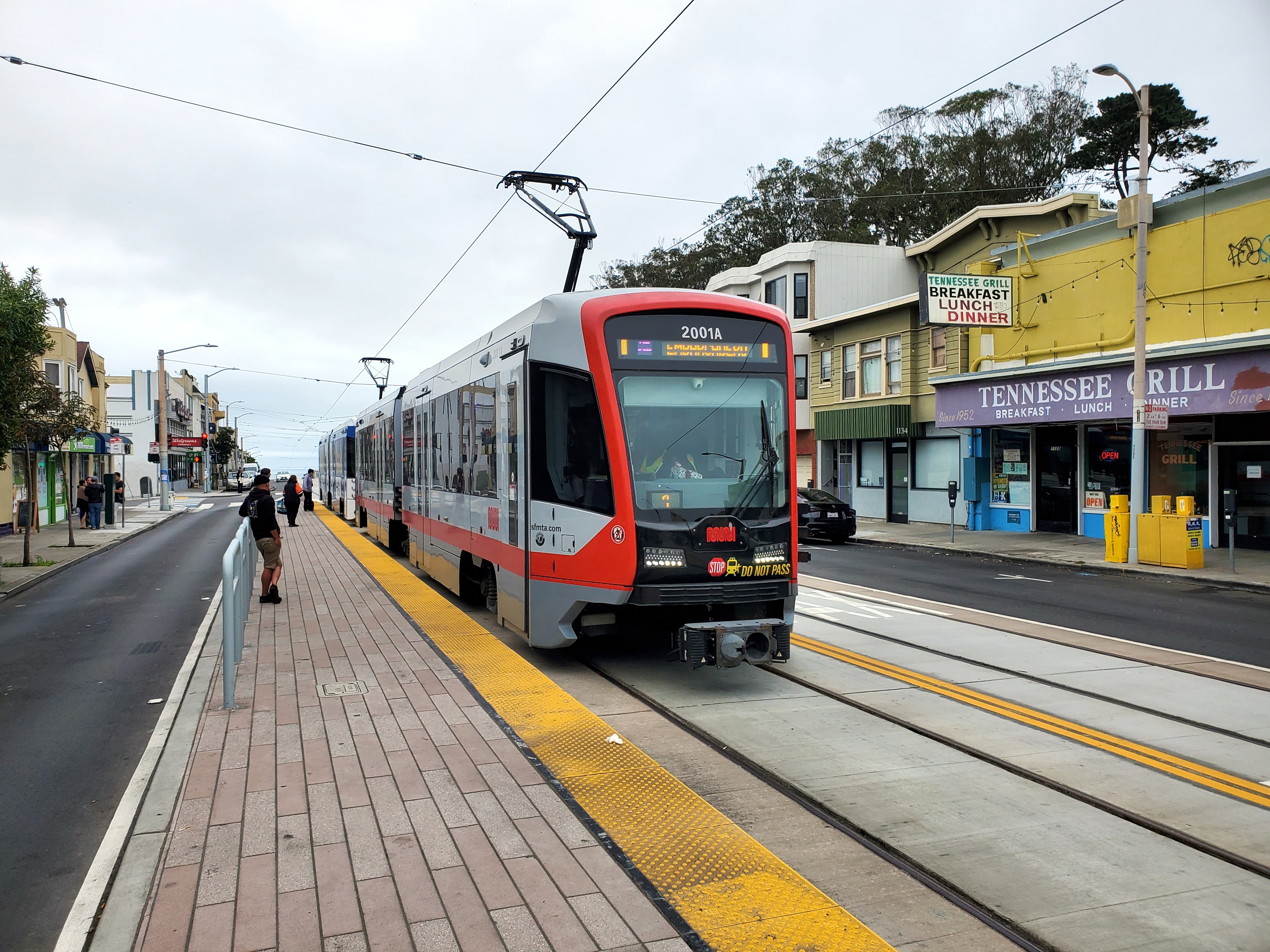
- An inbound train at 22nd Avenue in 2024

General information
- Location: Taraval Street between 21st and 24th Avenues; San Francisco, California
- Coordinates: 37°44′34″N 122°28′44″W
- Platforms: 2 side platforms
- Tracks: 2

Construction
- Accessible: Yes

History
- Opened: c. 1910 (URR); April 12, 1919 (Muni)
- Rebuilt: c. 1990, 2022–2024

Services
Preceding station	Muni	Following station
Taraval and 26th Avenue toward SF Zoo	L Taraval	Taraval and 19th Avenue toward Embarcadero
Location

Taraval and 22nd Avenue / Taraval and 23rd Avenue stations are a pair of light rail stops on the Muni Metro L Taraval line, located in the Parkside neighborhood of San Francisco, California. The eastbound stop is located on Taraval Street at 22nd Avenue, while westbound trains stop on Taraval Street at 23rd Avenue.

== History ==
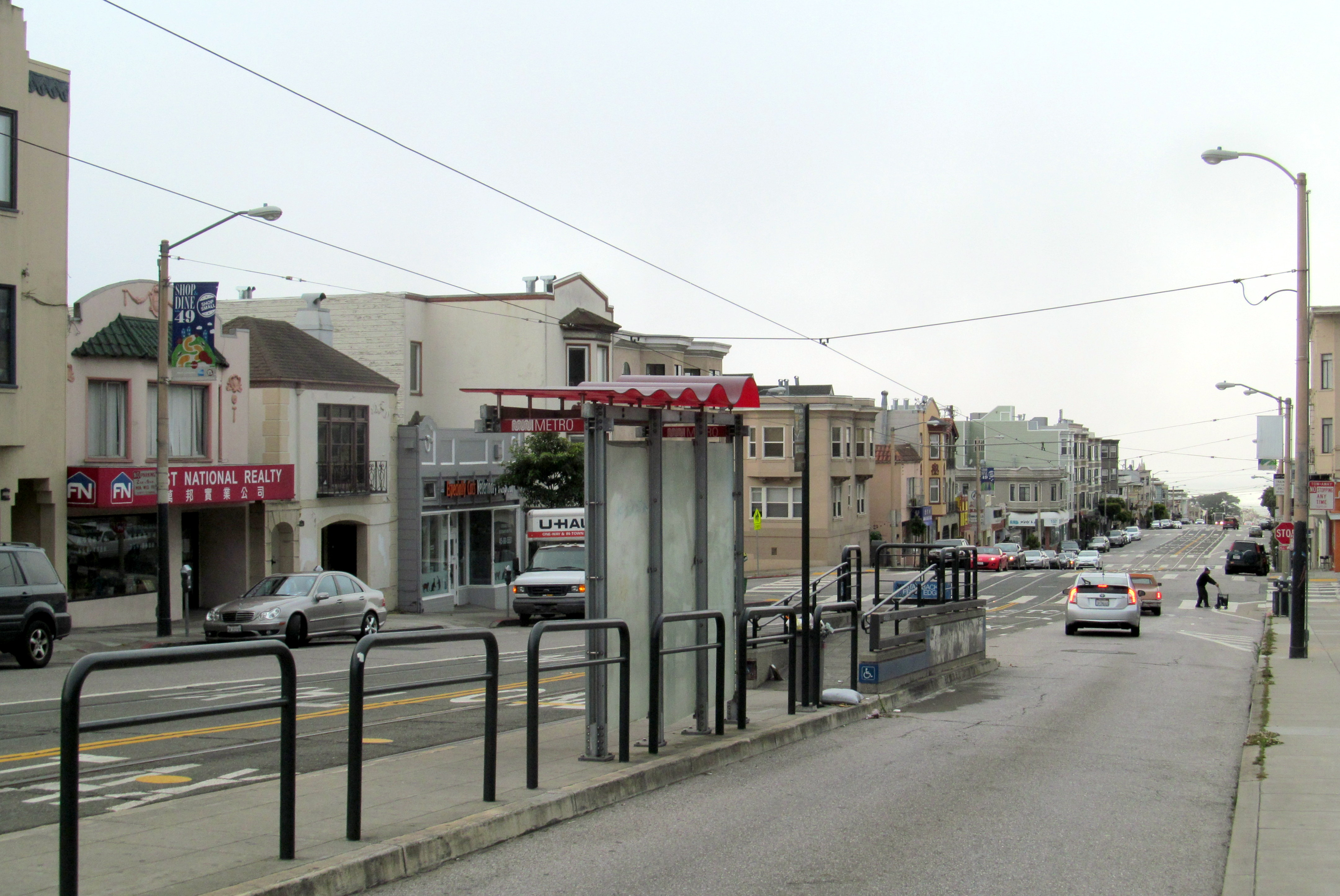
The westbound boarding island at 23rd Avenue in 2017

In June 1908, United Railroads (URR) subsidiary Parkside Transit Company laid a single-track line that ran on 20th Avenue from an existing line on H Street (now Lincoln Way) to Wawona Street, then on Wawona one block to 19th Avenue. A connecting shuttle line running from 20th Avenue on Taraval Street, 33rd Avenue, Vicente Street, and 35th Avenue to Sloat Boulevard (meeting the 12 Ocean line) was opened by 1910. This trackage, which saw infrequent passenger service, formed a barrier to continued expansion of the city-owned Municipal Railway into the Parkside district. On November 25, 1918, the city and the private URR signed the "Parkside Agreements", which allowed Muni streetcars to use URR trackage on Taraval Street and on Ocean Avenue in exchange for a cash payment and shared maintenance costs. Muni's L Taraval line opened to 33rd Avenue (on rebuilt URR trackage west of 20th Avenue) on April 12, 1919. The URR discontinued their Parkside Shuttle in late 1927.

The L Taraval formerly had stops spaced every 2 blocks from 22nd Avenue to 32nd Avenue; trains generally stopped at marked poles before the cross street, and passengers crossed travel lanes to board. With the introduction of new LRVs in the 1990s, the stops at 22nd Avenue and 24th Avenue were modified to provide access to McCoppin Park and adjacent commercial and residential areas. A small accessible high platform and concrete boarding island were added for westbound passengers west of 23rd Avenue and for eastbound passengers east of 22nd Avenue. The non-accessible stops at 24th Avenue eastbound and 22nd Avenue westbound continued to be used.

In March 2014, Muni released details of the proposed implementation of their Transit Effectiveness Project (later rebranded MuniForward), which included a variety of stop changes for the L Taraval line. The westbound stop at 22nd Avenue and the eastbound stop at 24th Avenue would be discontinued, effectively combining the existing accessible platforms (with extended boarding islands) at 22nd Avenue and 23rd Avenue into a single stop.

On September 20, 2016, the SFMTA Board approved the L Taraval Rapid Project. Construction was to occur from 2018 to 2020. The eastbound boarding island at 22nd Avenue would be extended to the east, with the accessible platform moved adjacent to 21st Avenue; the westbound boarding island would be extended east across 23rd Avenue. Early implementation of stop eliminations and other changes, including the end of westbound service to 22nd Avenue and eastbound service to 24th Avenue, occurred on February 25, 2017.

On March 30, 2020, all Muni Metro service was replaced with buses due to the COVID-19 pandemic. Muni Metro rail service returned on August 22, 2020, but was replaced again by buses on August 25. Construction on Segment B of the project, between West Portal and Sunset Boulevard, began in January 2022 and was completed in mid-2024. L Taraval rail service resumed on September 28, 2024.
