= Taraval and 44th Avenue station =

Muni Metro station in San Francisco

Taraval and 44th Avenue
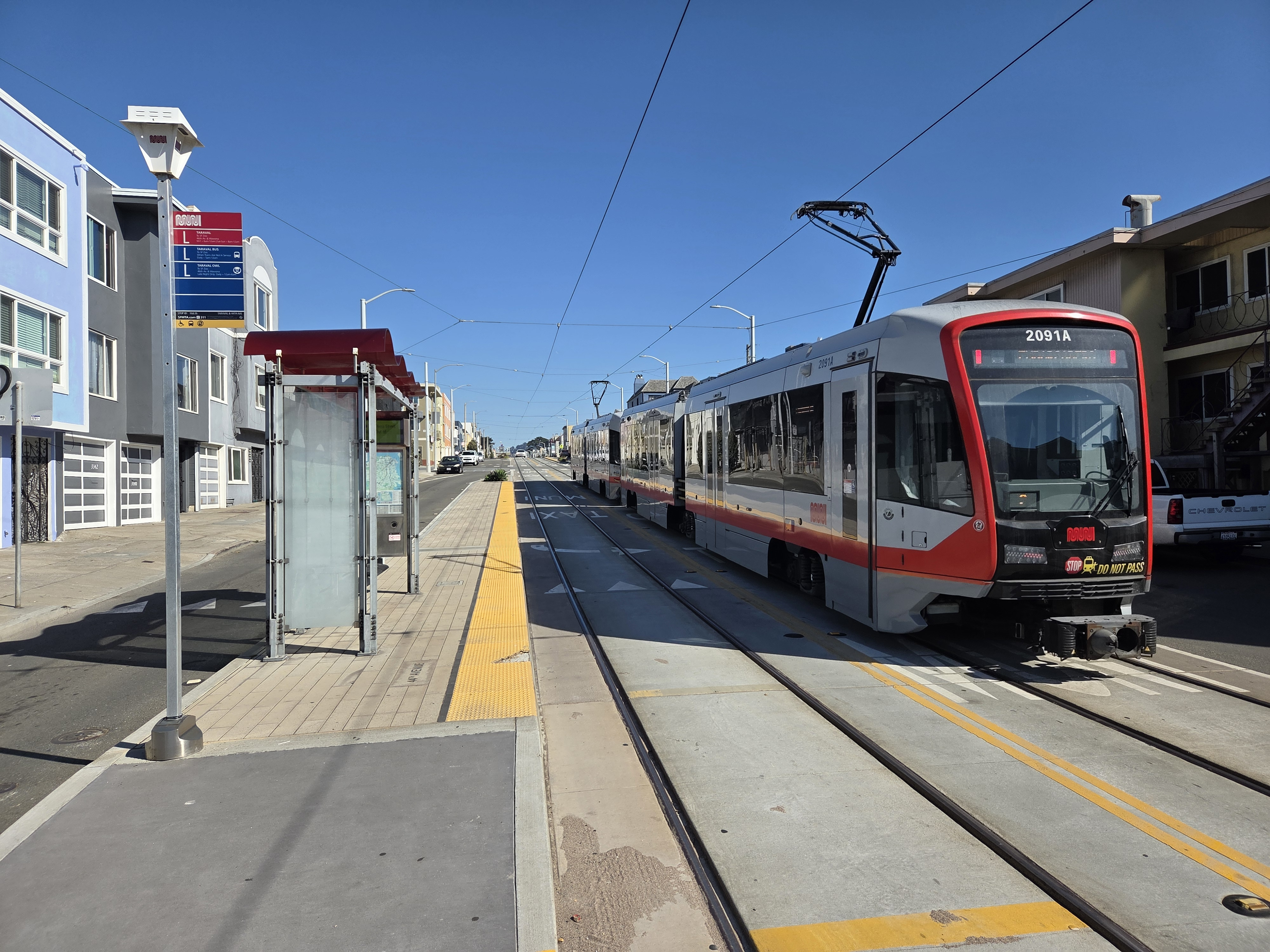
- An inbound train leaving the station in 2025

General information
- Location: Taraval Street at 44th Avenue; San Francisco, California
- Coordinates: 37.74187°N 122.50247°W
- Platforms: 2 side platforms
- Tracks: 2

Construction
- Accessible: No

History
- Opened: January 14, 1923
- Rebuilt: 2019–2021

Services
Preceding station	Muni	Following station
Taraval and 46th Avenue toward SF Zoo	L Taraval	Taraval and 42nd Avenue toward Embarcadero
Location

Taraval and 44th Avenue is a light rail stop on the Muni Metro L Taraval line, located in the Parkside neighborhood of San Francisco, California. The station opened with the second section of the L Taraval line on January 14, 1923.

== Service ==
In August 2020, service along the route was replaced by buses to allow for the construction of improvements to the L Taraval line. The project was finished on September 28, 2024, and train service along the line resumed on that day.

The stop is served by the L Bus and L Owl bus routes, which provide service along the L Taraval line during the early morning and late night hours respectively when trains do not operate.

== Reconstruction ==
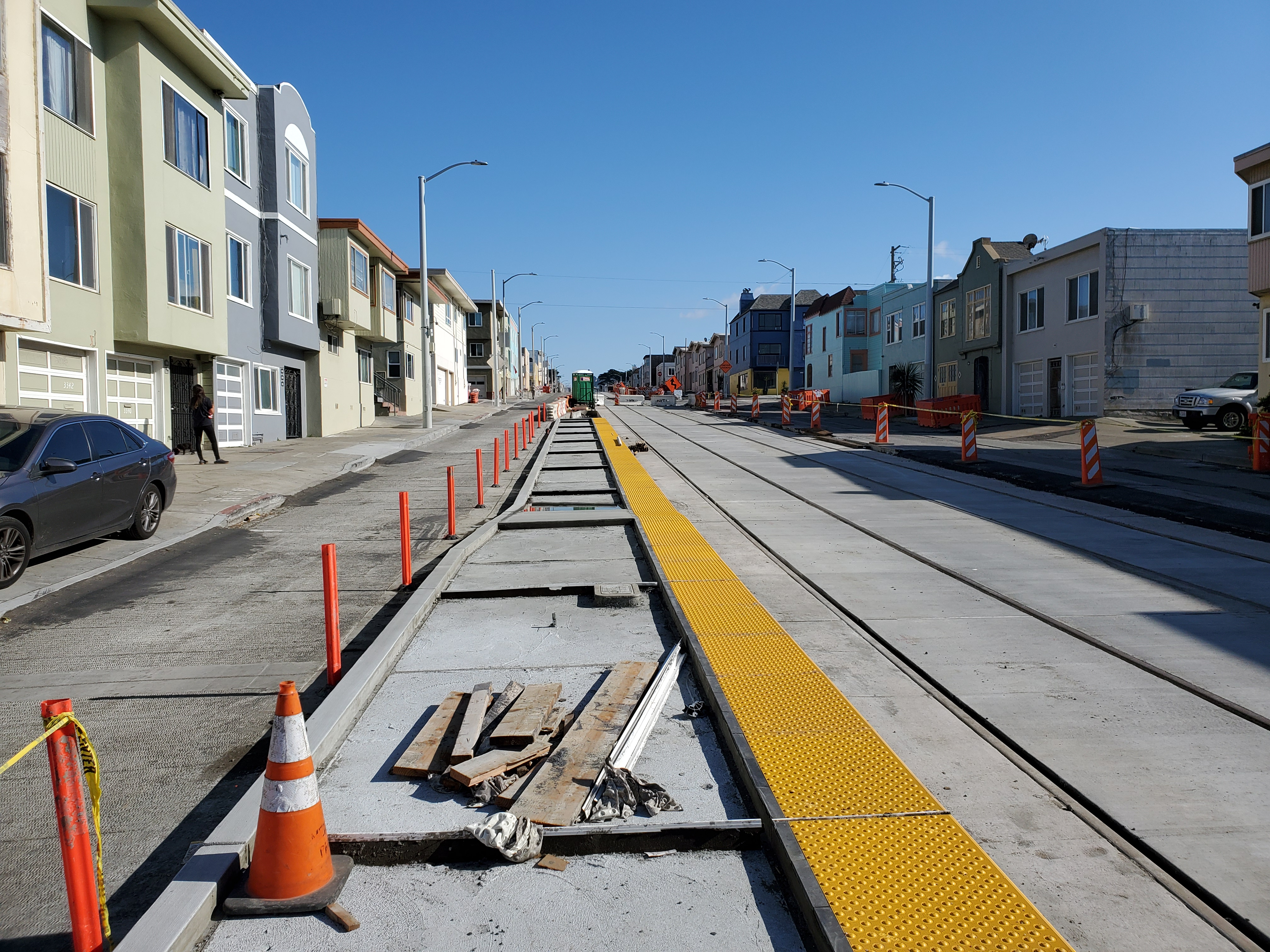
Westbound platform construction in 2021

Like many stations on the line, Taraval and 44th Avenue had no platforms; trains stopped at marked poles before the cross street, and passengers crossed travel lanes to board. In March 2014, Muni released details of the proposed implementation of their Transit Effectiveness Project (later rebranded MuniForward), which included a variety of stop changes for the L Taraval line. The stops at 44th Avenue would be removed to improve stop spacing on the line.

On September 20, 2016, the SFMTA Board approved the L Taraval Rapid Project. Early implementation of many changes, including stop eliminations, occurred on February 25, 2017. The stops at 44th Avenue were temporarily kept in response to neighborhood concerns. If further study indicated the stop should be retained, concrete boarding islands would be installed during the main construction phase. In November 2017, Muni staff proposed to remove the stop to improve reliability and restore parking spaces. However, the SFMTA Board voted in December 2017 to retain the stop and construct boarding islands.

Construction on the first phase of the project, between 33rd Avenue and 46th Avenue, began in September 2019. When Muni Metro service resumed on August 22, 2020, after a five-month closure during the COVID-19 pandemic, L Taraval service remained suspended west of Sunset Boulevard for construction. Rail service was re-replaced with buses on August 25 due to issues with malfunctioning overhead wire splices and the need to quarantine control center staff after a COVID-19 case. Construction of the eastbound platform began on December 10, 2020; construction of the westbound platform began on January 4, 2021. The first phase of the project, including the platforms at 44th Avenue, was completed in July 2021.
