= 46th Avenue and Ulloa station =

Muni Metro light rail stop in San Francisco

46th Avenue and Ulloa
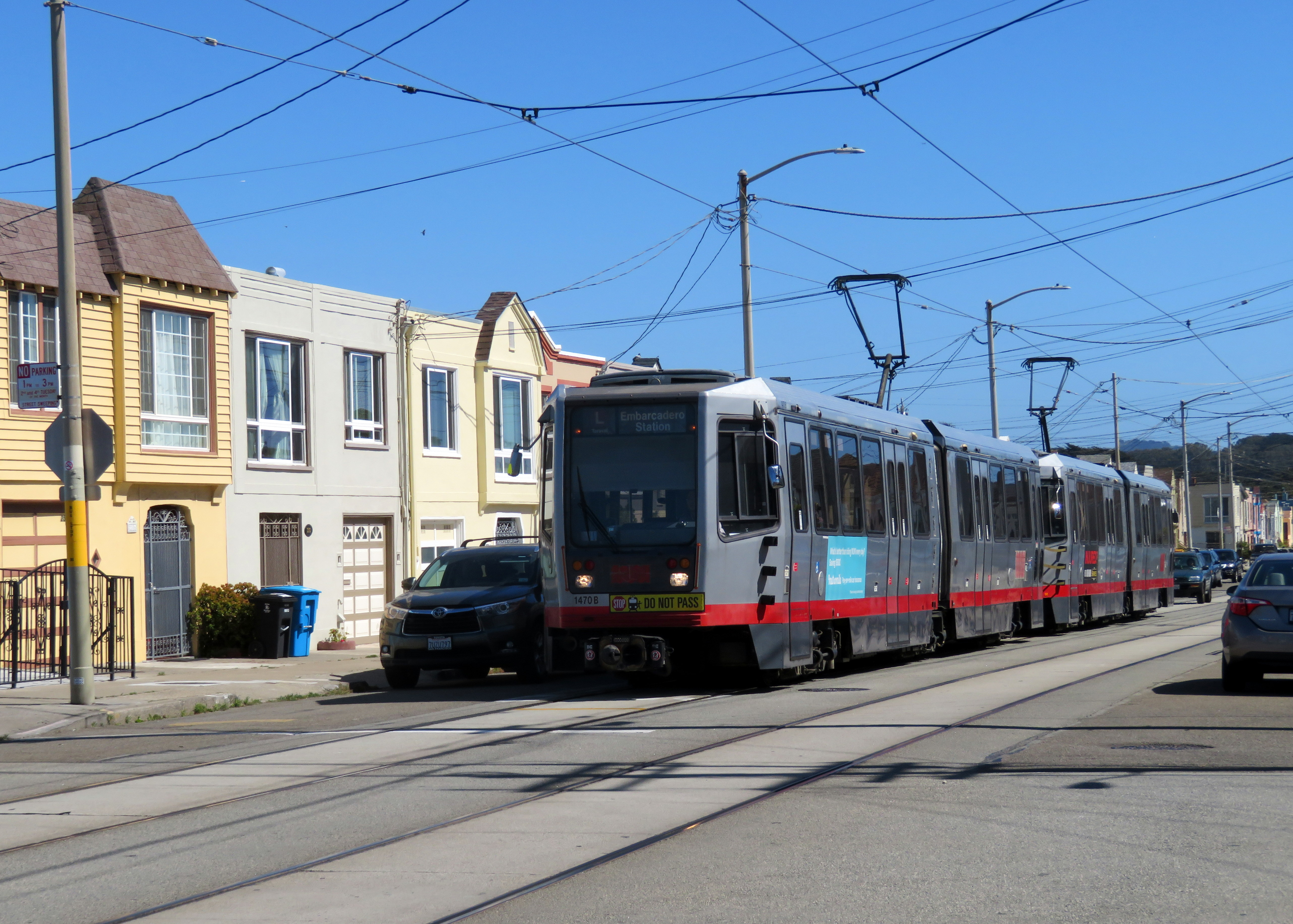
- Eastbound train at 46th Avenue and Ulloa in June 2018

General information
- Location: 46th Avenue at Ulloa Street; San Francisco, California
- Coordinates: 37°44′24″N 122°30′16″W
- Platforms: None, passengers wait on sidewalk
- Tracks: 2
- Connections: Muni: 18

Construction
- Accessible: No

History
- Opened: September 15, 1937

Services
Preceding station	Muni	Following station
46th Avenue and Vicente toward SF Zoo	L Taraval	46th Avenue and Taraval toward Embarcadero
Location

46th Avenue and Ulloa is a light rail stop on the Muni Metro L Taraval line, located in the Parkside neighborhood of San Francisco, California. The stop has no platforms; trains stop at marked poles before the cross street. The stop opened with an extension of the line on September 15, 1937.

== Service ==
In August 2020, service along the route was replaced by buses to allow for the construction of improvements to the L Taraval line. The project was finished on September 28, 2024, and train service along the line resumed on that day.

The stop is also served by the route 18 bus, plus the L Bus and L Owl bus routes, which provide service along the L Taraval line during the early morning and late night hours respectively when trains do not operate.
