= Taraval and 42nd Avenue station =

Train station in San Francisco, California, U.S.

Taraval and 42nd Avenue
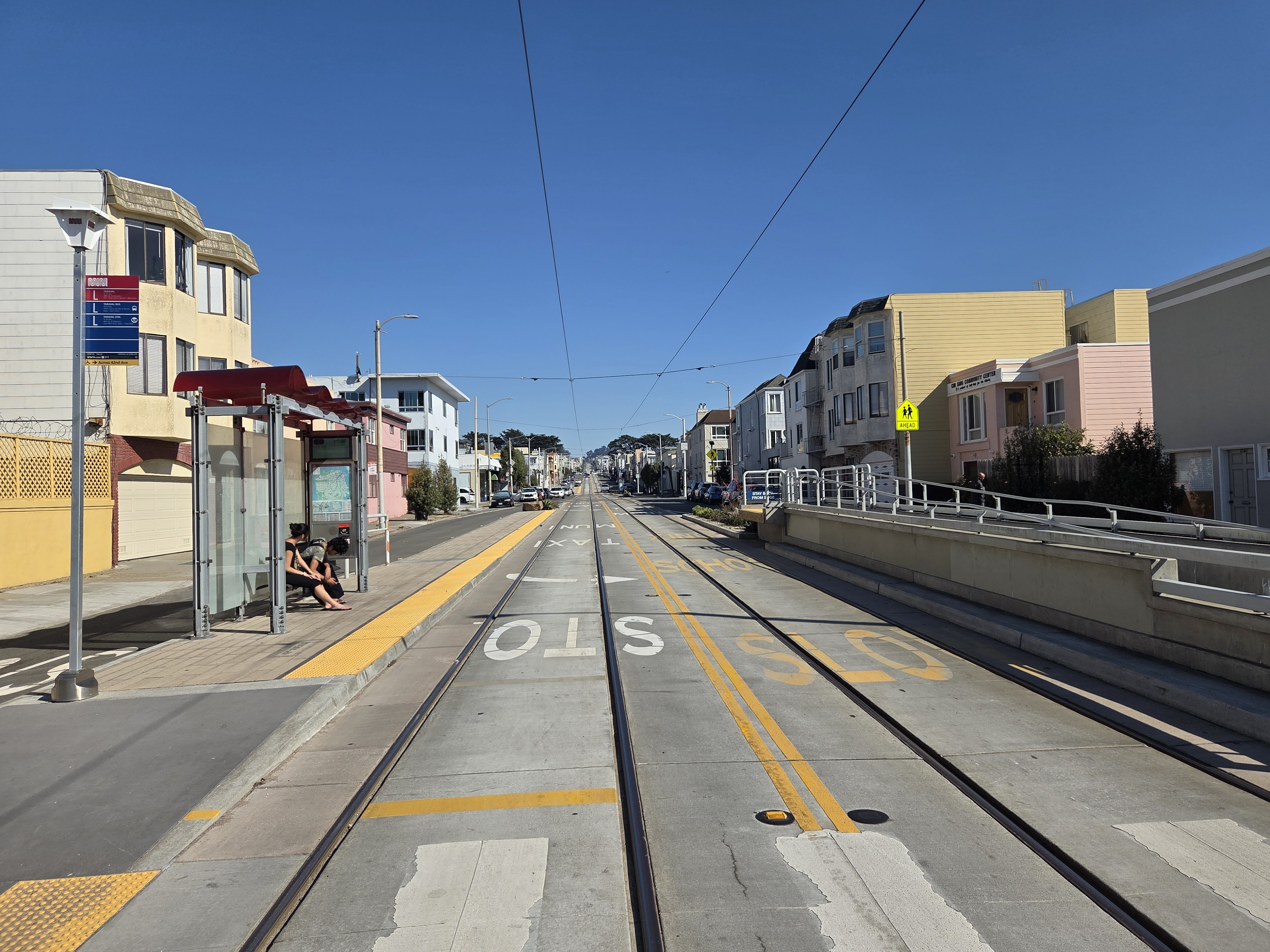
- Platforms at Taraval and 42nd Avenue in 2025

General information
- Location: Taraval Street at 42nd Avenue; San Francisco, California
- Coordinates: 37.74196°N 122.50033°W
- Platforms: 2 side platforms
- Tracks: 2

Construction
- Accessible: Yes

History
- Opened: January 14, 1923
- Rebuilt: 2019–2021

Services
Preceding station	Muni	Following station
Taraval and 44th Avenue toward SF Zoo	L Taraval	Taraval and 40th Avenue toward Embarcadero
Location

Taraval and 42nd Avenue is a light rail stop on the Muni Metro L Taraval line, located in the Parkside neighborhood of San Francisco, California. The station opened with the first section of the L Taraval line on January 14, 1923.

== Service ==
In August 2020, service along the route was replaced by buses to allow for the construction of improvements to the L Taraval line. The project was finished on September 28, 2024, and train service along the line resumed on that day.

The stop is served by the L Bus and L Owl bus routes, which provide service along the L Taraval line during the early morning and late night hours respectively when trains do not operate.

== Reconstruction ==
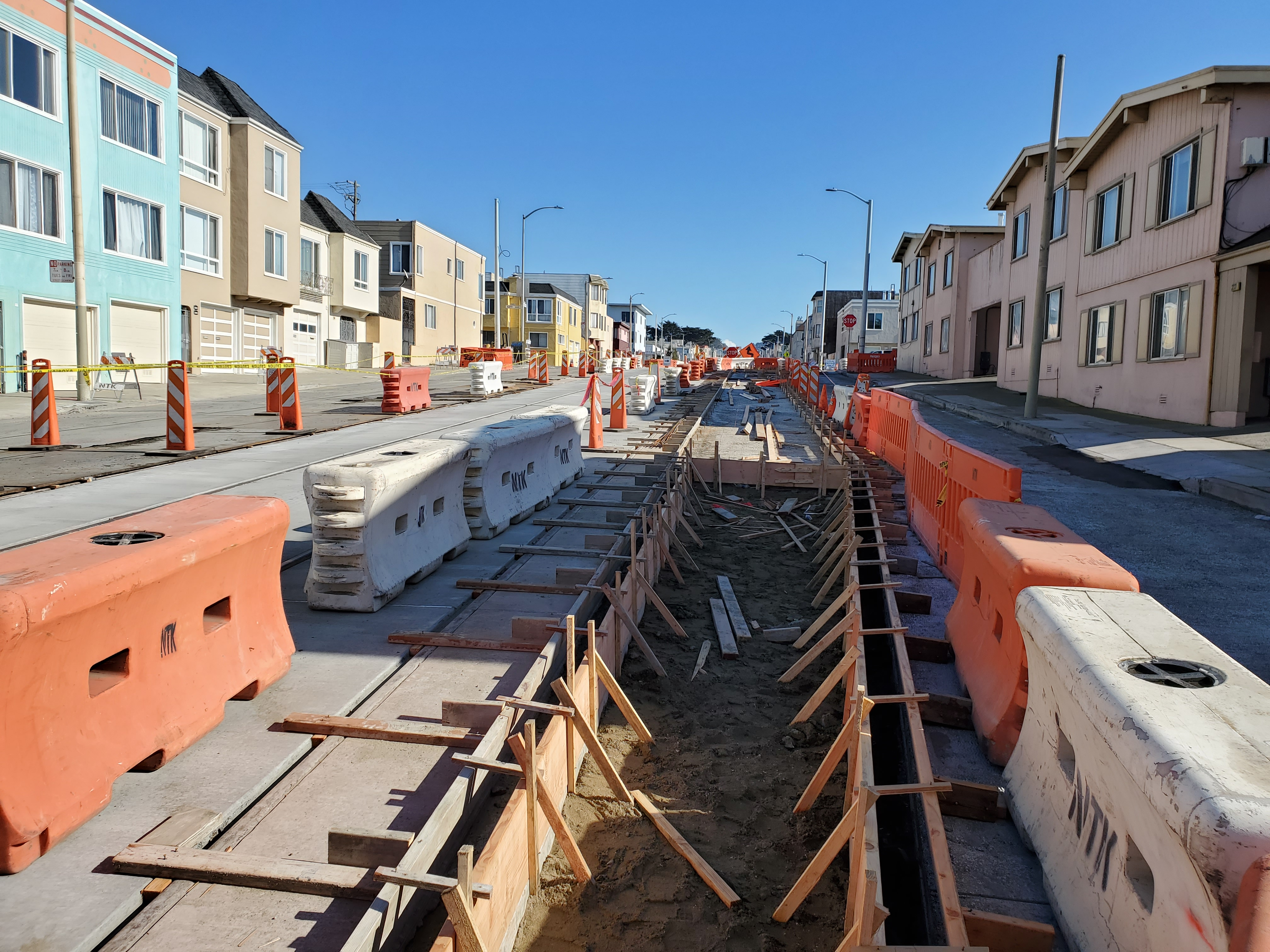
Eastbound platform construction in 2021

Like many stations on the line, for the first 100 years in service, Taraval and 42nd Avenue had no platforms; passengers waited on sidewalks, trains stopped at marked poles before the cross street, and passengers cross travel lanes to board. In March 2014, Muni released details of the proposed implementation of their Transit Effectiveness Project (later rebranded MuniForward), which included a variety of stop changes for the L Taraval line. The stops at 42nd Avenue would be moved to the far side of the cross street as boarding islands, with traffic calming measures.

On September 20, 2016, the SFMTA Board approved the L Taraval Rapid Project. Under the revised plan, extended platforms would be built in the middle of Taraval (traffic islands) on the near side of the cross street, with a short mini-high platform providing access to people with disabilities located on the far side of the cross street.

Early implementation of some project elements, including painted clear zones where the boarding islands were to be located, was done in early 2017.

Construction on the first phase of the project, between 33rd Avenue and 46th Avenue, began in September 2019. Construction of the eastbound accessible platform began on January 6, 2021, followed by the eastbound boarding island on January 20. Construction on the westbound boarding island and accessible platform began on February 19, 2021. The first phase of the project, including the platforms at 42nd Avenue, was completed in July 2021.
