= L Taraval =

Light rail line in San Francisco, California

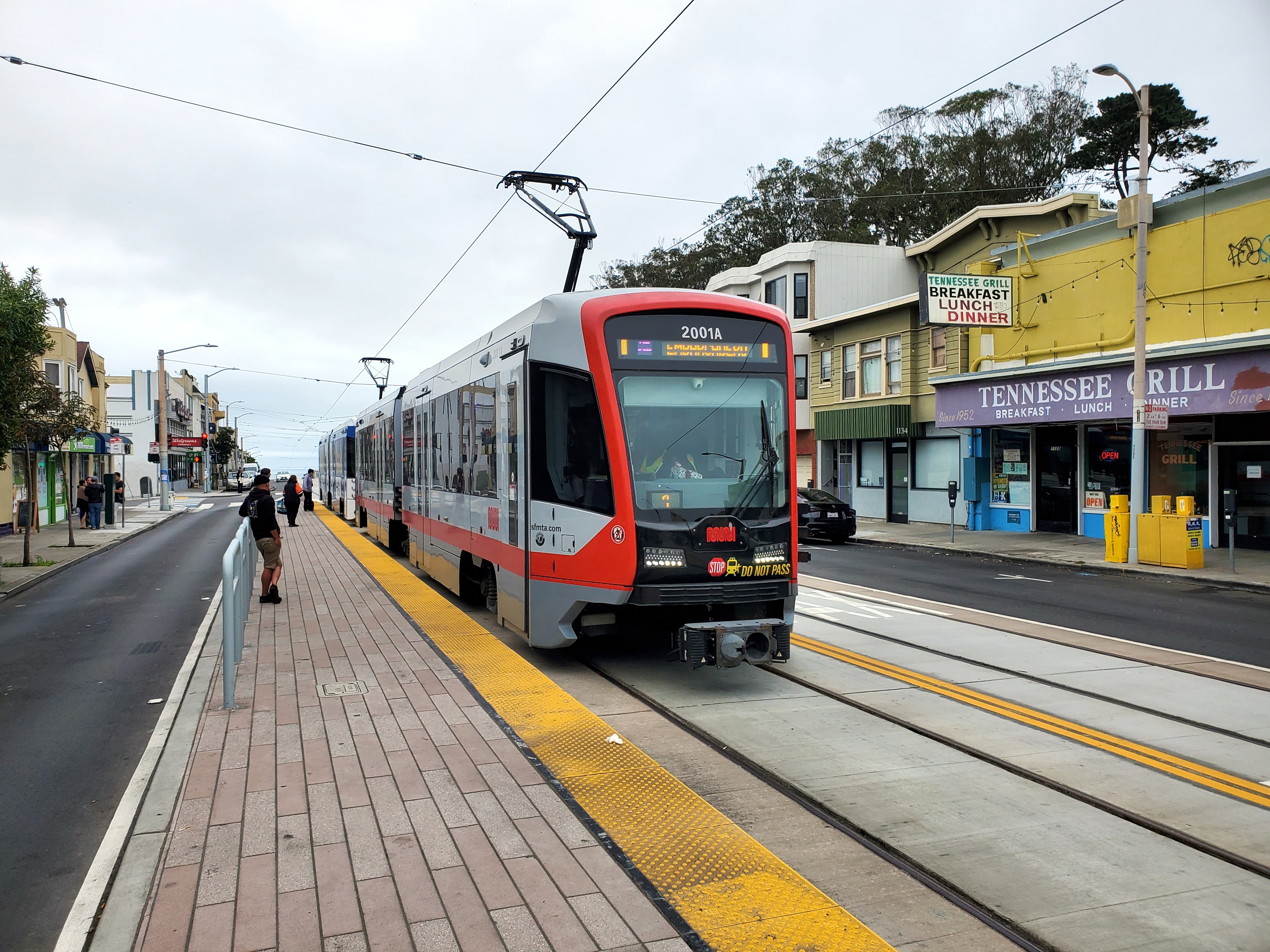
- An inbound train at Taraval and 22nd Avenue in 2024

Overview
- Owner: San Francisco Municipal Transportation Agency
- Locale: San Francisco, California
- Termini: Wawona and 46th Avenue (SF Zoo); Embarcadero station
- Stations: 27

Service
- Type: Light rail/streetcar
- System: Muni Metro
- Operator: San Francisco Municipal Railway
- Rolling stock: Breda LRV3, Siemens LRV4
- Daily ridership: 19,000 (June 2026)

History
- Opened: April 12, 1919

Technical
- Track gauge: 4 ft 8 1/2 in (1,435 mm) standard gauge
- Electrification: Overhead line, 600 V DC
Route map
L Taraval highlighted in purple

The L Taraval is a light rail line of the Muni Metro system in San Francisco, California, mainly serving the Parkside District. While many streetcar lines were converted to bus lines after World War II, the L Taraval remained a streetcar line due to its use of the Twin Peaks Tunnel.

== Route description ==
The line begins at Wawona and 46th Avenue station (near the San Francisco Zoo), which is on a one-way loop on Vicente Street, 47th Avenue, Wawona Street, and 46th Avenue. It runs north on 46th Avenue to Taraval Street, then runs east on Taraval Street to 15th Avenue. The line then runs south one block on 15th Avenue, then east on Ulloa Street to West Portal station, where it joins with the other Muni Metro lines towards Embarcadero.

=== Operation ===
Rail service runs on 10-minute headways on weekdays and 12-minute headways on weekends.

Service is provided by overnight Owl buses during the hours that rail service is not running. The L Owl bus serves the full length of the route, as well as along The Embarcadero to Fisherman's Wharf. (The Embarcadero section was added on June 15, 2019, to provide Owl service along the F Market & Wharves route.)

== History ==
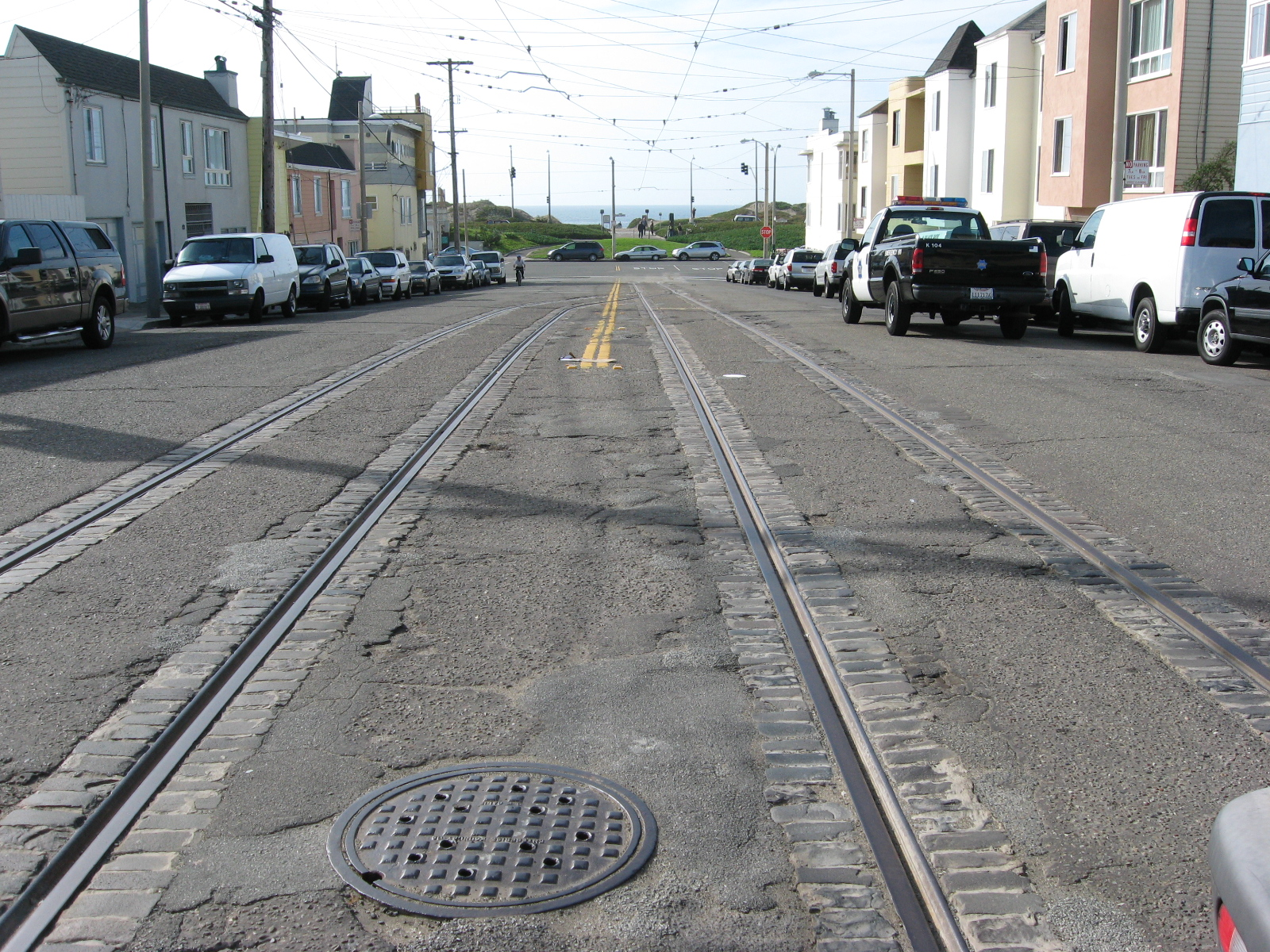
The original end of the L Taraval line, before the 1937 extension south of Taraval Street, with tracks still in place but not normally used. These are the only tracks left in San Francisco that are embedded in granite "Belgian block".

In June 1908, United Railroads (URR) subsidiary Parkside Transit Company laid a single-track line that ran on 20th Avenue from an existing line on H Street (now Lincoln Way) to Wawona Street, then on Wawona one block to 19th Avenue. A connecting shuttle line running from 20th Avenue on Taraval Street, 33rd Avenue, Vicente Street, and 35th Avenue to Sloat Boulevard (meeting the 12 Ocean line) was opened by 1910. This trackage, which saw irregular passenger service, formed a barrier to the continued expansion of the city-owned Municipal Railway into the Parkside district. On November 25, 1918, the city and the private URR signed the "Parkside Agreements", which allowed Muni streetcars to use URR trackage on Taraval Street and on Ocean Avenue in exchange for a cash payment and shared maintenance costs.

Muni's L Taraval line opened as a shuttle between West Portal and 33rd Avenue (on rebuilt URR trackage west of 20th Avenue) on April 12, 1919. Tracks were extended along Taraval to 48th Avenue at Ocean Beach by January 14, 1923 and on October 15, the shuttle service was replaced with larger streetcars running through to the Ferry Building. The URR discontinued their service on the line in late 1927.

The L Taraval was extended south (turning off Taraval at 46th) to the San Francisco Zoo, the line's current outer terminus, on September 15, 1937, leaving a two-block spur line on Taraval, that is used occasionally for temporary storage.

Over the next decade, the line's eastern terminus changed a few times. On January 15, 1939, every other streetcar was routed to the new Transbay Terminal. On January 1, 1941, cars were rerouted back to the Ferry Building. The Transbay Terminal became the inner terminal for all streetcars on June 6, 1948.

By 1950, many streetcar lines in the city were converted to buses after World War II, the L Taraval remained a streetcar line due to its use of the Twin Peaks Tunnel.

The L was partially converted to modern light rail operation as part of the opening of the Muni Metro system in 1980.

=== L Taraval Improvement Project ===
==== Planning ====
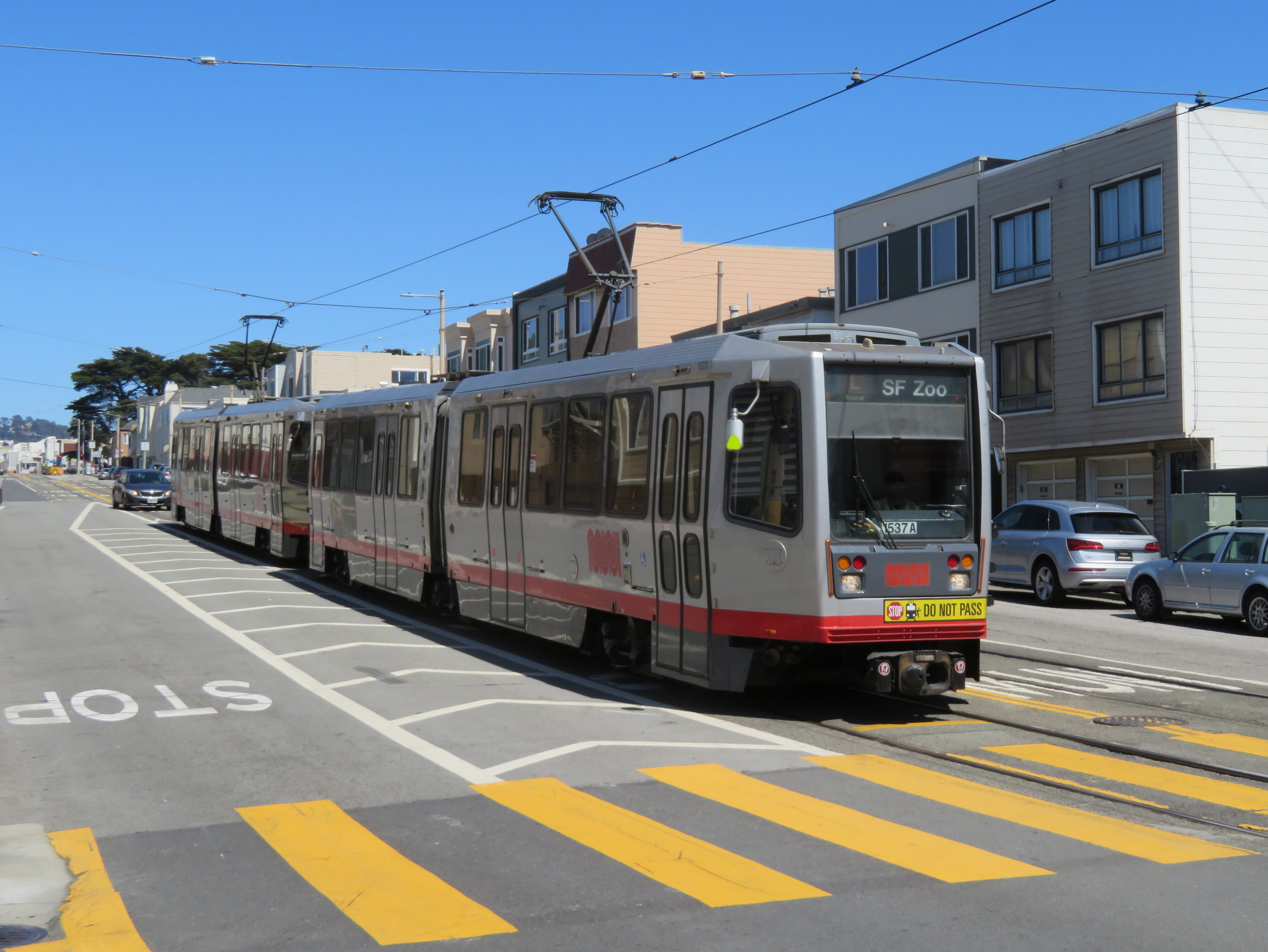
Painted exclusion zone to protect passengers at Taraval & 40th station (Jun 2018)

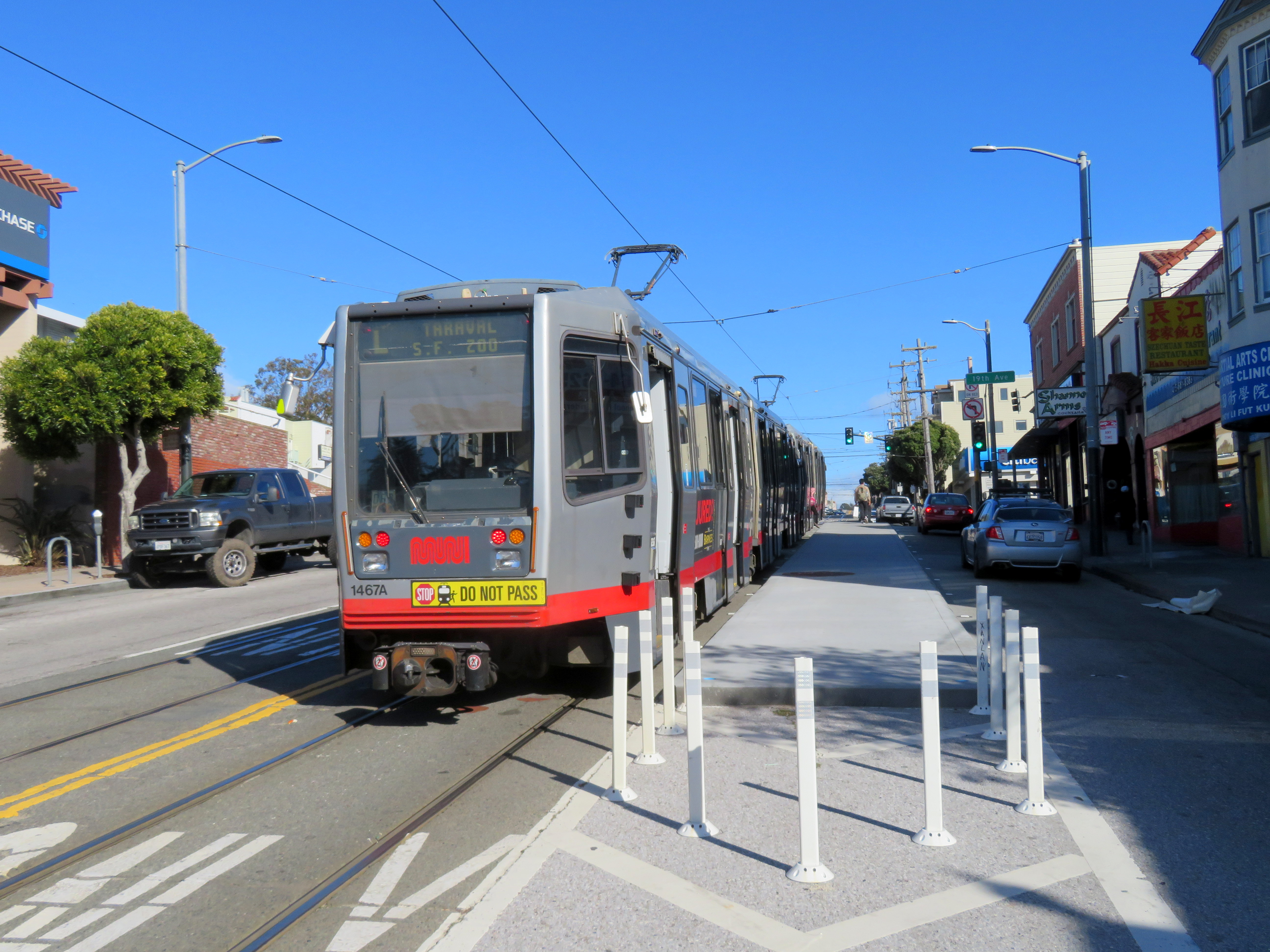
New concrete boarding island at Taraval & 19th station (Feb 2019)

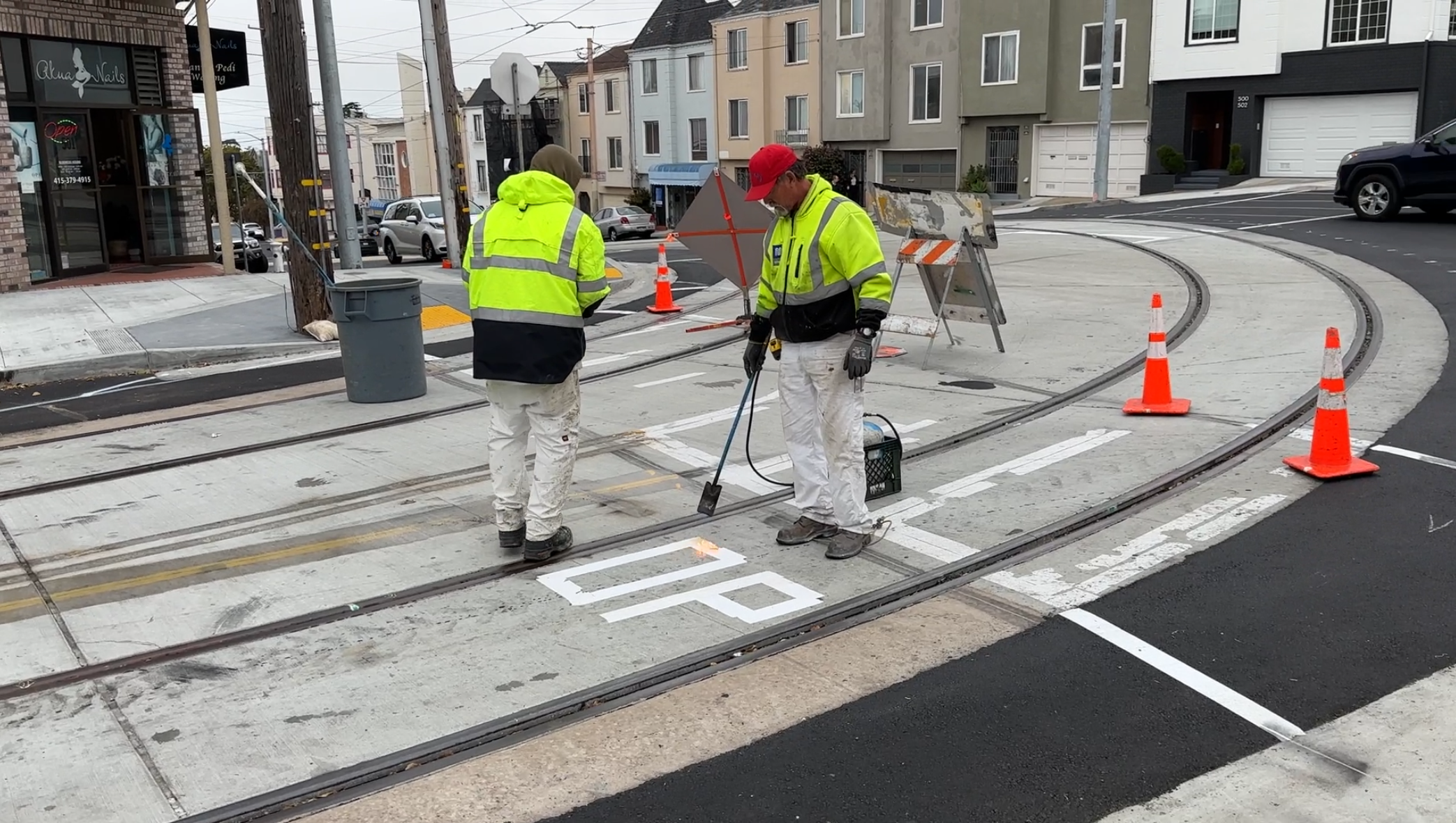
Worker apply finishing touches before return to service (May 2024)

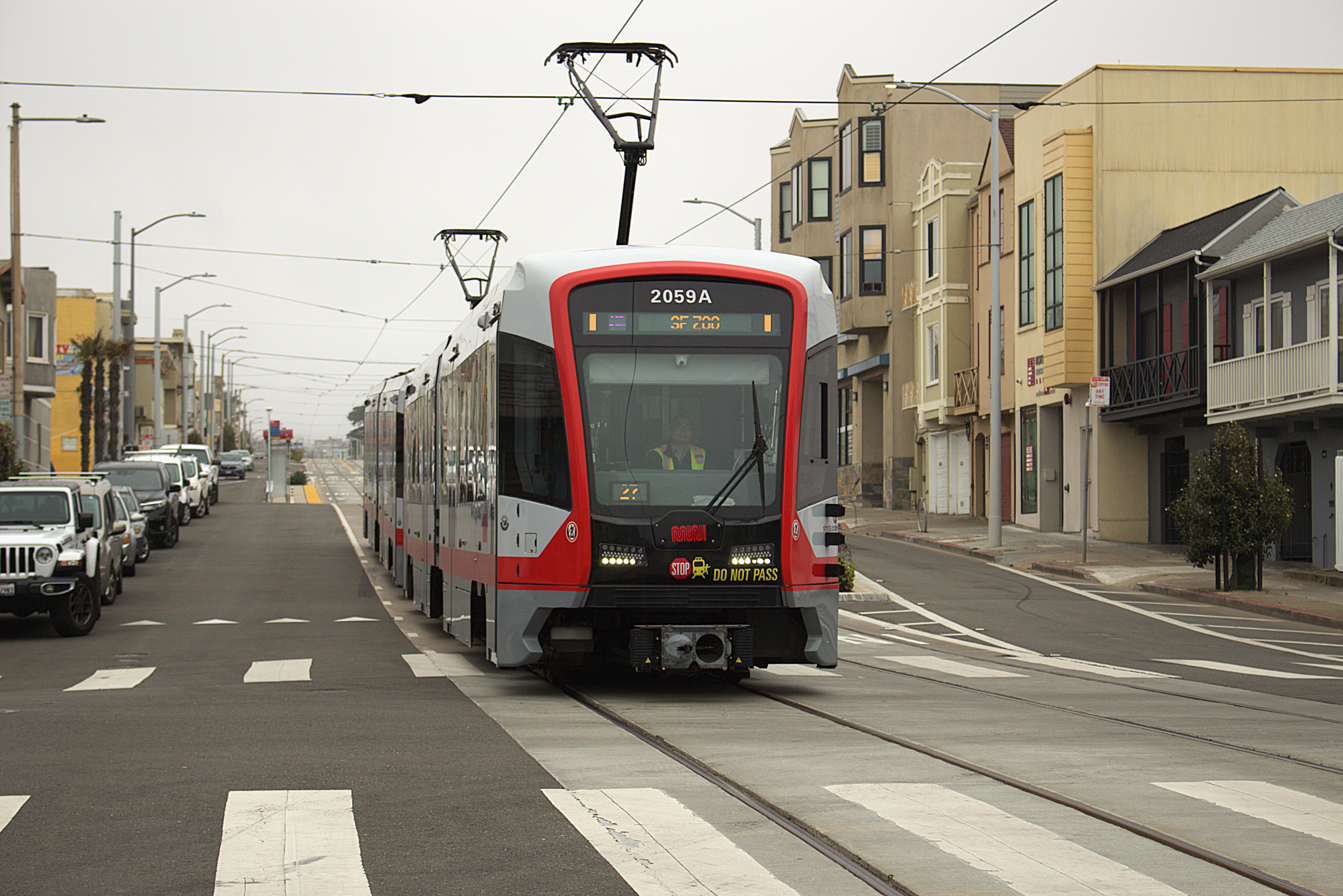
An outbound train to SF Zoo the day of reopening

For its first 100 years in operation, the L Taraval operated similarly to a bus, with rail vehicles receiving no priority over any other vehicle, obeying all stop signs, and stopping frequently when requested or when flagged down by passengers waiting at marked stops on the sidewalk. Because the rails were in the center of a four-lane roadway, passengers boarding or exiting must cross an active traffic lane. Often, drivers would not stop for crossing passengers, leading to many being hit and injured getting off and on the L Taraval over the decades.

Starting in the early 2010s, Muni began proposing major changes to the L Taraval corridor to increase pedestrian safety and speed up trains, which would prove controversial. The plan, eventually named the L Taraval Improvement Project, would dedicate the center lanes to rail vehicles, consolidate stops, and, where stops remain, add boarding islands between the transit-only lane and the general traffic lane, giving passengers a protected area to exit or wait for the L Taraval. The project would also replace many of the stop signs along the route with traffic signals with transit priority, add additional traffic calming measures like curb extensions, replace the worn rails and overhead wire, along with sewer and water line replacements.

The plan was controversial because adding boarding islands would require the removal of street parking along Taraval, worrying nearby merchants, who feared less parking would reduce traffic in their businesses. The loss of parking along Taraval would be offset by moving parking spaces and meters to side streets and by converting side streets to angled parking to increase density. Seniors and some disability advocates were opposed to the removal of stops because it would require longer walks for some passengers. Other disability advocates supported the project because it would add accessible ramps at more stops.

Under pressure from these groups, Muni agreed to a pilot project in 2016 to see if better street markings would get more drivers to stop for crossing passengers. The pilot program was unsuccessful, showing only a two percent increase in drivers stopping behind trains. The final plan added boarding islands at 19th, 26th, 30th, 32nd, 40th, 42nd, 44th, and 46th (westbound only), along with an extension of the existing islands at Sunset and 22nd/23rd Avenues. Stops were removed in 2017 and 2018 at 15th Avenue, 17th (westbound), 22nd (westbound), 24th (eastbound), 28th, and 35th.

==== Construction ====
Construction on Segment A of the project, between Sunset Boulevard and 46th Avenue, began in August 2019. As part of Segment A work, the original track on Taraval west of 46th – the only track in the city still set in granite "Belgian blocks" – was replaced. In a nod to its history, the blocks were saved and re-set next to the new tracks. Bus substitution for Segment A was planned to begin in spring 2020. However, on March 30, 2020, all Muni Metro service was replaced with buses due to the COVID-19 pandemic.

Muni Metro rail service returned on August 22, 2020, with the routes reconfigured to improve reliability in the subway: K Ingleside and L Taraval service were interlined, running between Taraval and Sunset and Balboa Park station; no K Ingleside or L Taraval service entered the subway. Buses continued to replace rail service west of Sunset Boulevard to allow for construction. The forced transfer at West Portal was criticized by disability advocates. Rail service was replaced again by buses on August 25, 2020 due to issues with malfunctioning overhead wire splices and the need to quarantine control center staff after a positive COVID-19 case.

K Ingleside rail service resumed again on May 15, 2021, and Segment A work was completed that July, but the L remained a bus route. Construction on Segment B of the project, between West Portal and Sunset Boulevard, began in January 2022. Segment B work was expected to last through 2024. On July 7, 2022, the L Bus was shortened from downtown to West Portal station and frequency was increased. Additional limited bus service to downtown, operating weekday middays on 50-minute headways, was added on October 10, 2022.

Rail service resumed on September 28, 2024, with trains operating between Embarcadero and the San Francisco Zoo.

== Station listing ==
Station/Stop	Neighborhood	Muni Metro lines	Notes and connections
Embarcadero	Financial District	J Church K Ingleside M Ocean View N Judah S Shuttle	BART: F Market & Wharves; California; SF Ferry Building; Muni: 1, 2, 6, 7X, 9, 9R, 12, 14, 14R, 14X, 21, 30X, 31, 41, 81X, 82X; Golden Gate Transit, Presidio Go Shuttle, SamTrans
Montgomery	Financial District	J Church K Ingleside M Ocean View N Judah S Shuttle	BART: F Market & Wharves; Muni: 2, 3, 5, 5R, 6, 7, 7X, 8, 8AX, 8BX, 9, 9R, 10, 15, 21, 30, 31, 45, 76X, 81X, Geary BRT (38, 38R); AC Transit, Golden Gate Transit, SamTrans
Powell	Civic Center, Mid-Market, Tenderloin	(at Union Sq/Market St)	BART: F Market & Wharves; Powell–Hyde, Powell–Mason; Muni: 5, 5R, 6, 7, 7X, 8, 8AX, 8BX, 9, 9R, 15, 21, 27, 30, 31, 45, 81X; AC Transit, SamTrans
Civic Center/UN Plaza	Civic Center, Mid-Market, Tenderloin	J Church K Ingleside M Ocean View N Judah S Shuttle	BART: F Market & Wharves; Muni: 5, 5R, 6, 7, 9, 9R, 19, 21, 83X; AC Transit, Golden Gate Transit, SamTrans
Van Ness	Civic Center, Mid-Market, Tenderloin	J Church K Ingleside M Ocean View N Judah S Shuttle	F Market & Wharves; Muni: 6, 7, 9, 9R, Van Ness BRT (47, 49, 79X, 90 Owl); AC Transit, Golden Gate Transit, SamTrans
Church	Duboce Triangle, Mission Dolores	(surface stop)	F Market & Wharves; Muni: 22, 37
Castro	The Castro	K Ingleside M Ocean View S Shuttle	F Market & Wharves; Muni: 24, 35, 37
Forest Hill	Forest Hill	K Ingleside M Ocean View S Shuttle	Muni: 36, 43, 44, 52
West Portal	West Portal	K Ingleside M Ocean View S Shuttle	Muni: 48, 57
Ulloa and 14th Avenue	West Portal		Muni: 48
15th Avenue and Taraval (WB)	Parkside		
Taraval and 17th Avenue (EB)	Parkside		
Taraval and 19th Avenue	Parkside		Muni: 28, 28R
Taraval and 22nd/23rd Avenues	Parkside		
Taraval and 26th Avenue	Parkside		
Taraval and 30th Avenue	Parkside		Muni: 66
Taraval and 32nd Avenue	Parkside		
Taraval and Sunset	Parkside		Muni: 29
Taraval and 40th Avenue	Parkside		
Taraval and 42nd Avenue	Parkside		
Taraval and 44th Avenue	Parkside		
Taraval and 46th Avenue (WB); 46th Avenue and Taraval (EB)	Parkside		Muni: 18
46th Avenue and Ulloa	Parkside		Muni: 18
46th Avenue and Vicente	Parkside		Muni: 18
SF Zoo	Parkside		Located at 46th Avenue and Wawona, serves the San Francisco Zoo; Muni: 18
