= Wawona and 46th Avenue station =

Light rail stop in San Francisco, California

Wawona and 46th Avenue
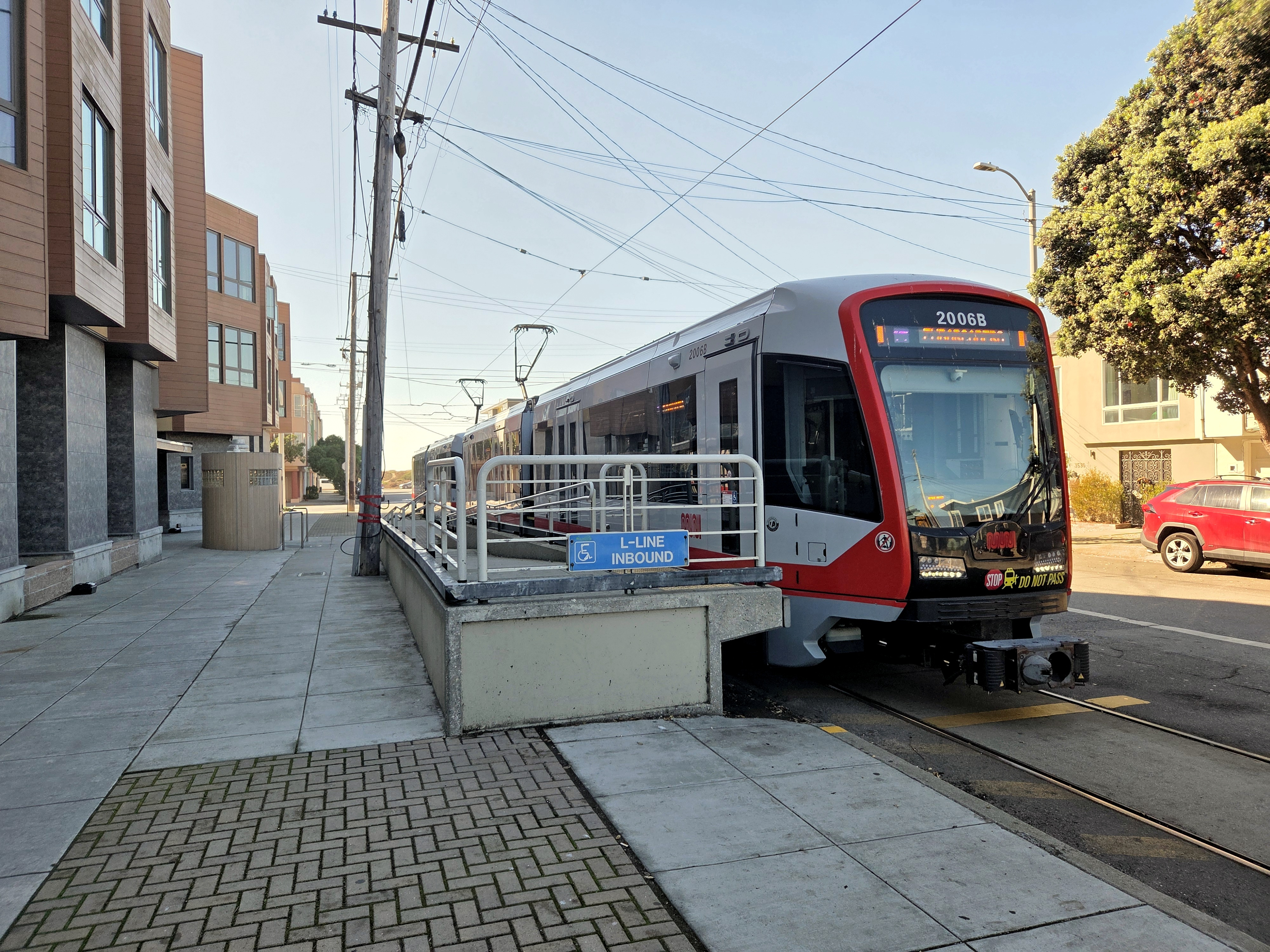
- An L Taraval train at the stop in 2025

General information
- Other names: SF Zoo
- Location: Wawona Street at 46th Avenue; San Francisco, California
- Coordinates: 37.73618°N 122.50421°W
- Platforms: 1 side platform
- Tracks: 1 (balloon loop)
- Connections: Muni: 18

Construction
- Cycle facilities: Rack
- Accessible: Yes

History
- Opened: September 15, 1937

Services
Preceding station	Muni	Following station
Terminus	L Taraval	46th Avenue and Vicente toward Embarcadero
Location

Wawona and 46th Avenue station (also known as SF Zoo) is a light rail stop on the Muni Metro L Taraval line, located in the Parkside neighborhood of San Francisco, California. The stop opened as the terminus of an extension of the line to the San Francisco Zoo on September 15, 1937. It has a single side platform (a transit bulb that is part of the sidewalk) serving a single-track loop. A mini-high platform provides access to people with disabilities.

== Service ==
In August 2020, service along the route was replaced by buses to allow for the construction of improvements to the L Taraval line. The project was finished on September 28, 2024, and train service along the line resumed on that day.

The stop is also served by the route 18 bus, plus the L Bus and L Owl bus routes, which provide service along the L Taraval line during the early morning and late night hours respectively when trains do not operate.
