= Ocean Avenue/CCSF Pedestrian Bridge station =

Muni Metro light rail station in San Francisco

City College
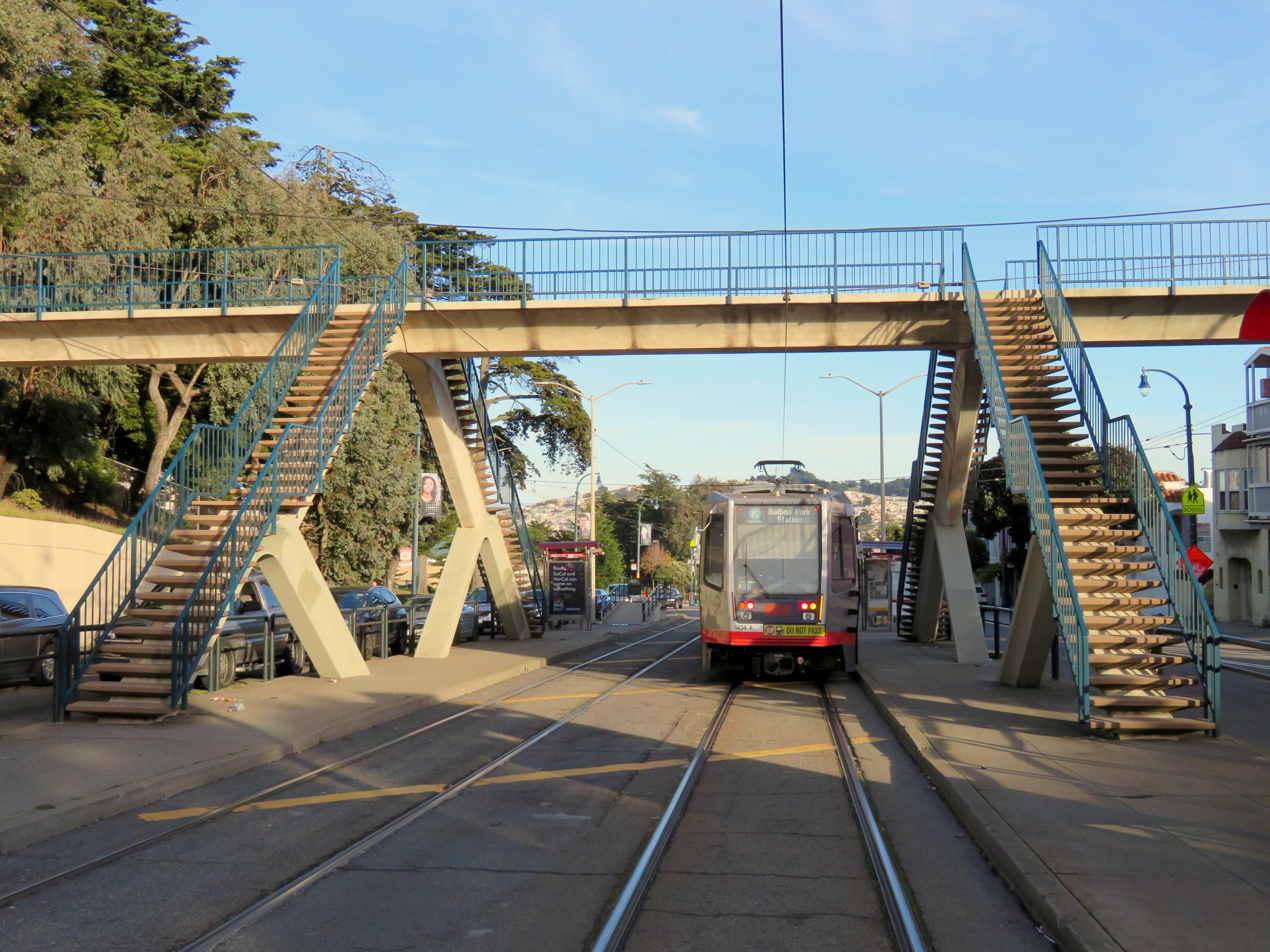
- An outbound train at the station in January 2018

General information
- Other names: Ocean Avenue/CCSF Pedestrian Bridge
- Location: Ocean Avenue at Geneva Avenue; San Francisco, California
- Coordinates: 37°43′23″N 122°27′08″W
- Platforms: 2 side platforms
- Tracks: 2
- Connections: Muni: 8, 8BX, 29, 43, 49

Construction
- Accessible: Yes, except pedestrian bridge

History
- Opened: December 4, 1895; April 23, 1979
- Closed: October 21, 1952

Services
| Preceding station | Muni | Following station |
|---|---|---|
| Ocean and Lee toward Embarcadero | K Ingleside | Balboa Park Terminus |
Location

Ocean Avenue/CCSF Pedestrian Bridge station (also known as City College) is a light rail station on the Muni Metro K Ingleside line, located between the Sunnyside and Ingleside neighborhoods of San Francisco, California adjacent to the City College of San Francisco (CCSF) campus. The stop consists of two side platforms in the median of Ocean Avenue, with stairs to a concrete footbridge that connects the campus to Geneva Avenue. It opened in 1979 with the extension of the line to Balboa Park station; it was previously served by the United Railroads 12 line from 1895 to 1945, and the K from 1945 to 1952.

The station is also served by bus routes 8, 8BX (a weekday peak hours express service), 29, 43 and 49, most of which stop at the nearby City College terminal. Additionally, the K Bus, K Owl and 91 Owl bus routes provide service along the K Ingleside line during the early morning and late night hours respectively when trains do not operate.

== History ==
The private Market Street Railway opened a branch — built in just six days — of its Mission Street line along Ocean Avenue to Victoria Street on December 4, 1895 to serve the new Ingleside Racetrack. The line was extended to the Ingleside House (where Ocean Avenue now meets Junipero Serra Boulevard) shortly thereafter. The 1906 earthquake damaged many cable car and streetcar lines; the URR resumed service on the Ocean Avenue (12) line on May 6, 1906.

On November 25, 1918, the city and the struggling URR signed the "Parkside Agreements," which allowed Muni streetcars to use URR trackage on Junipero Serra Boulevard, Ocean Avenue, and Taraval Street, in exchange for a cash payment and shared maintenance costs. The K Ingleside line was extended south on Junipero Serra Boulevard and east on Ocean to Ocean and Miramar on February 21, 1919. It was extended to its own terminal at Brighton and Grafton three months later; only the 12 ran east of Brighton Avenue on Ocean Avenue.

The city purchased the private company (renamed Market Street Railway in 1921) in 1944. On April 8, 1945, route 12 service was removed from Ocean Avenue, while the K Ingleside was extended on Ocean Avenue and Onondaga Street to Mission Street to provide a direct connection to route 14. Service was cut back to Phelan Loop to the west on October 10, 1952, although trackage as far as San Jose Avenue was kept for non-revenue moves to the carhouse.

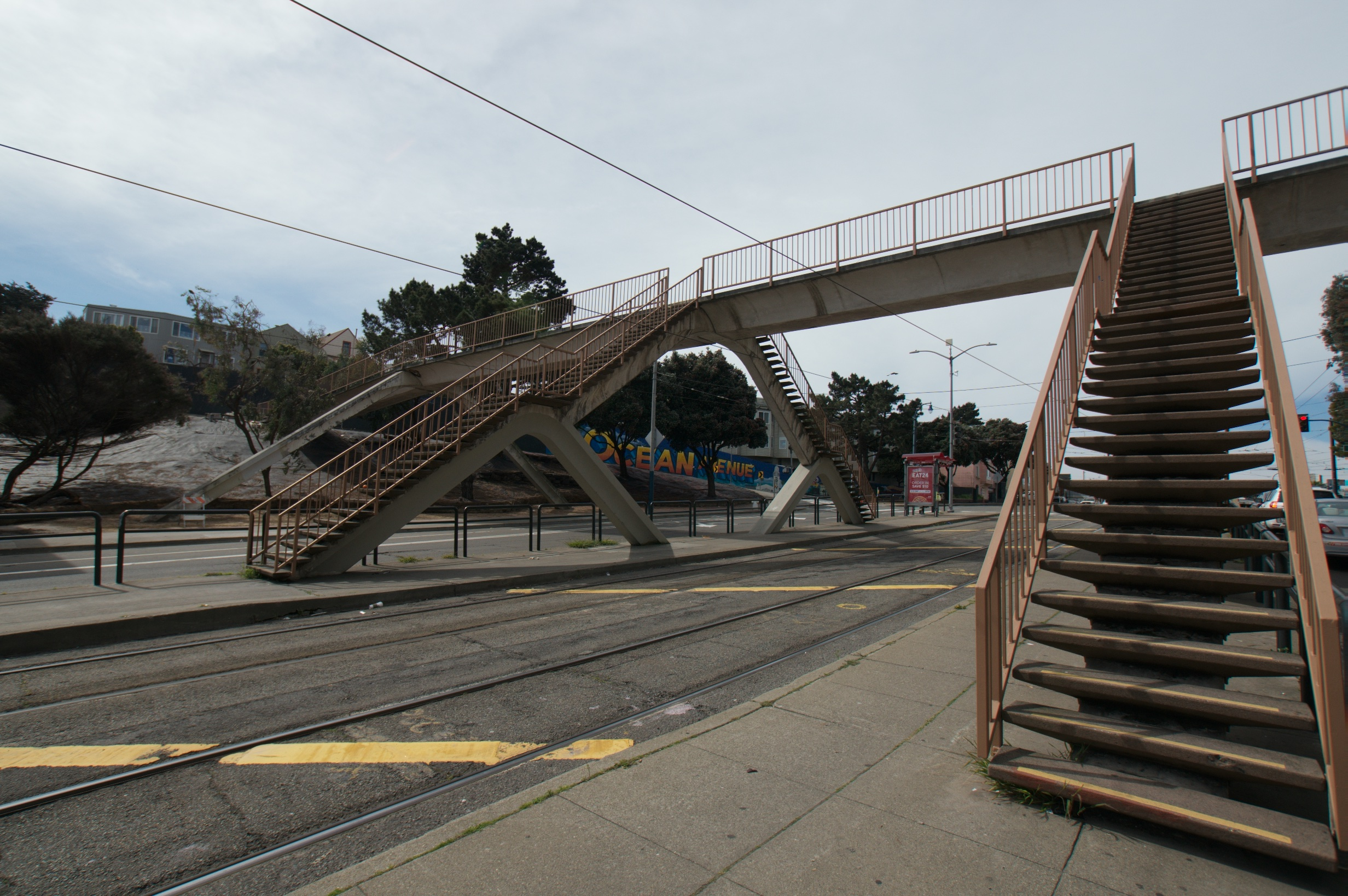
The pedestrian bridge, built in the 1970s, is poorly maintained and not accessible

In the 1970s, Muni rebuilt the non-revenue trackage for regular service so that K Ingleside service could be extended to the new Balboa Park station. The extension included a new intermediate stop just east of Geneva Avenue, serving the San Francisco City College campus. After two students from the nearby Lick-Wilmerding High School were injured by a speeding car that decade while trying to cross Ocean Avenue, a pedestrian bridge was constructed over Ocean Avenue. Designed by the city's Department of Public Works, the reinforced concrete bridge built in 1978 is 227 feet (69 m) long and 10 feet (3.0 m) wide, with staircases on both sides leading to each Muni platform. The first revenue service to the station was on April 23, 1979, although service past Phelan Loop did not run at all times until March 17, 1981.

In late 2016, the terminus of the K Ingleside line was temporarily relocated to Ocean and Phelan from Balboa Park while station improvements were being implemented at Balboa Park.

The pedestrian bridge is unpopular with the community because it is poorly maintained, not accessible, and removes pedestrian activity from the street. Since an Ocean Avenue entrance to Balboa Park station was opened in 2011, the bridge is less important to passengers taking BART to City College, and the presence of the platform causes a dangerous traffic merge. The 2012 Balboa Park Station Capacity and Conceptual Engineering Study Final Report proposed to move the stop one block east to Howth Street; the staircases would be removed from the bridge, but it would still be usable to cross Ocean Avenue. A 2015 city report considered removing the whole bridge, removing the stair risers but keeping the bridge, or renovating the bridge to be better lit and accessible. In 2016, a local civic group supported the stop move to Howth Street, where it would provide better access to CCSF and Lick-Wilmerding High School, as well as allowing improvements to the Ocean/Geneva intersection.
