= Ocean and Lee station =

Muni Metro light rail stop in San Francisco

Ocean and Lee
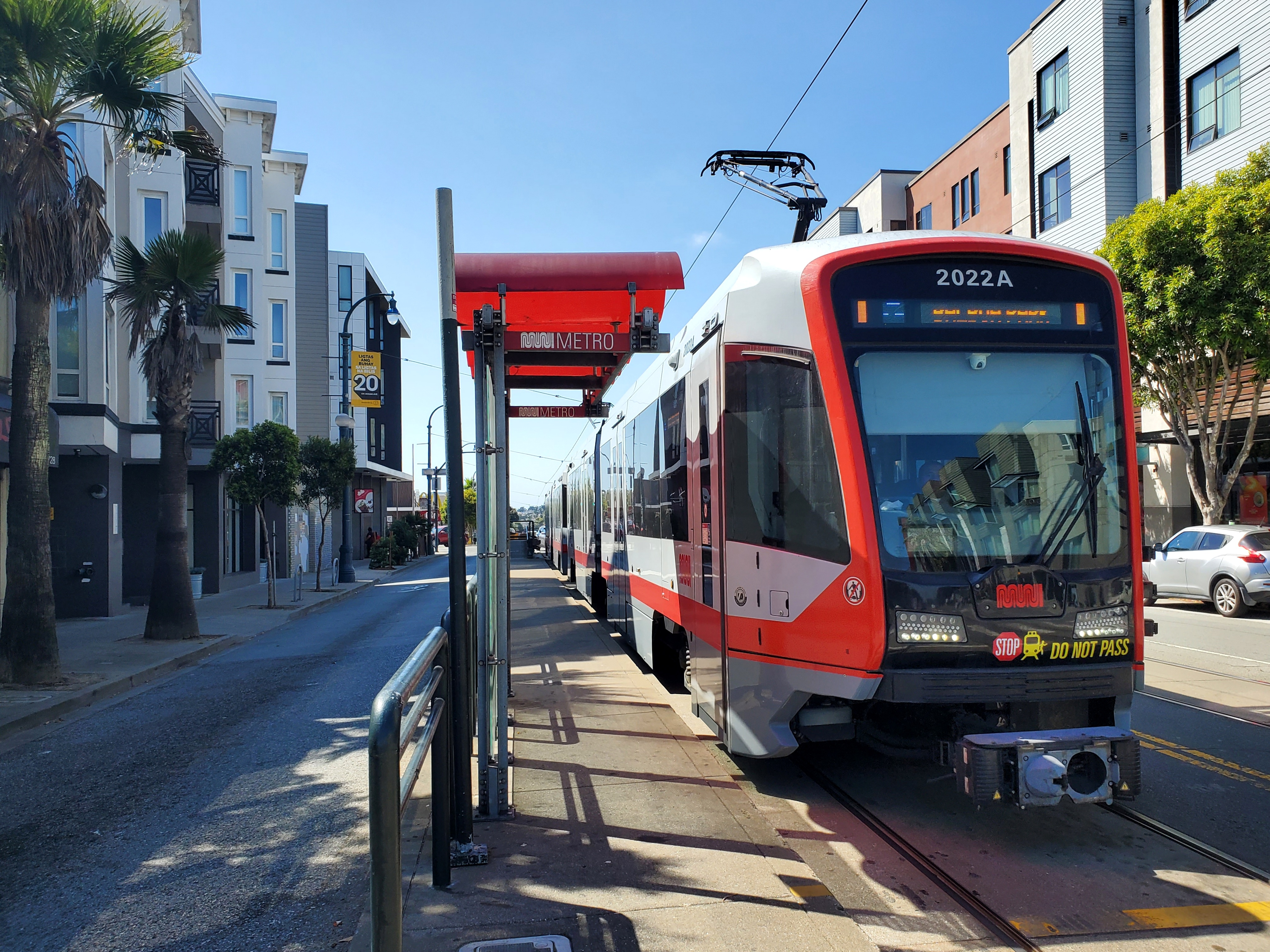
- An outbound train at Ocean and Lee in August 2024

General information
- Location: Ocean Avenue at Lee Avenue; San Francisco, California
- Coordinates: 37.72349°N 122.45410°W
- Platforms: 2 side platforms
- Tracks: 2
- Connections: Muni: 8, 8BX, 29, 43, 49

Construction
- Accessible: Yes

History
- Opened: December 4, 1895

Services
Preceding station	Muni	Following station
Ocean and Miramar toward Embarcadero	K Ingleside	City College toward Balboa Park
Location

Ocean and Lee station is a light rail stop on the Muni Metro K Ingleside line, located between the Westwood Park and Ingleside neighborhoods of San Francisco, California. The stop consists of two side platforms, with the eastbound (outbound) platform located on Ocean Avenue west of the intersection with Lee Street, and vice versa.

It originally opened in 1895 on the United Railroads 12 line. K Ingleside service then began in 1945. In 1952, the site became known as Phelan Loop after a loop was constructed for the K line, and a separate busway for the 12 line (which was converted to bus in 1948), north of Ocean Avenue and west of Phelan Avenue. Phelan Loop was then retired for streetcar service in 1981 and for bus service in 2013, replaced by the current Ocean and Lee Muni Metro platforms and the nearby City College bus terminal, respectively.

The station is also served by bus routes 8, 8BX (a weekday peak hours express service), 29, 43 and 49, most of which stop at the nearby City College terminal. Additionally, the K Bus, K Owl and 91 Owl bus routes provide service along the K Ingleside line during the early morning and late night hours respectively when trains do not operate.

== History ==
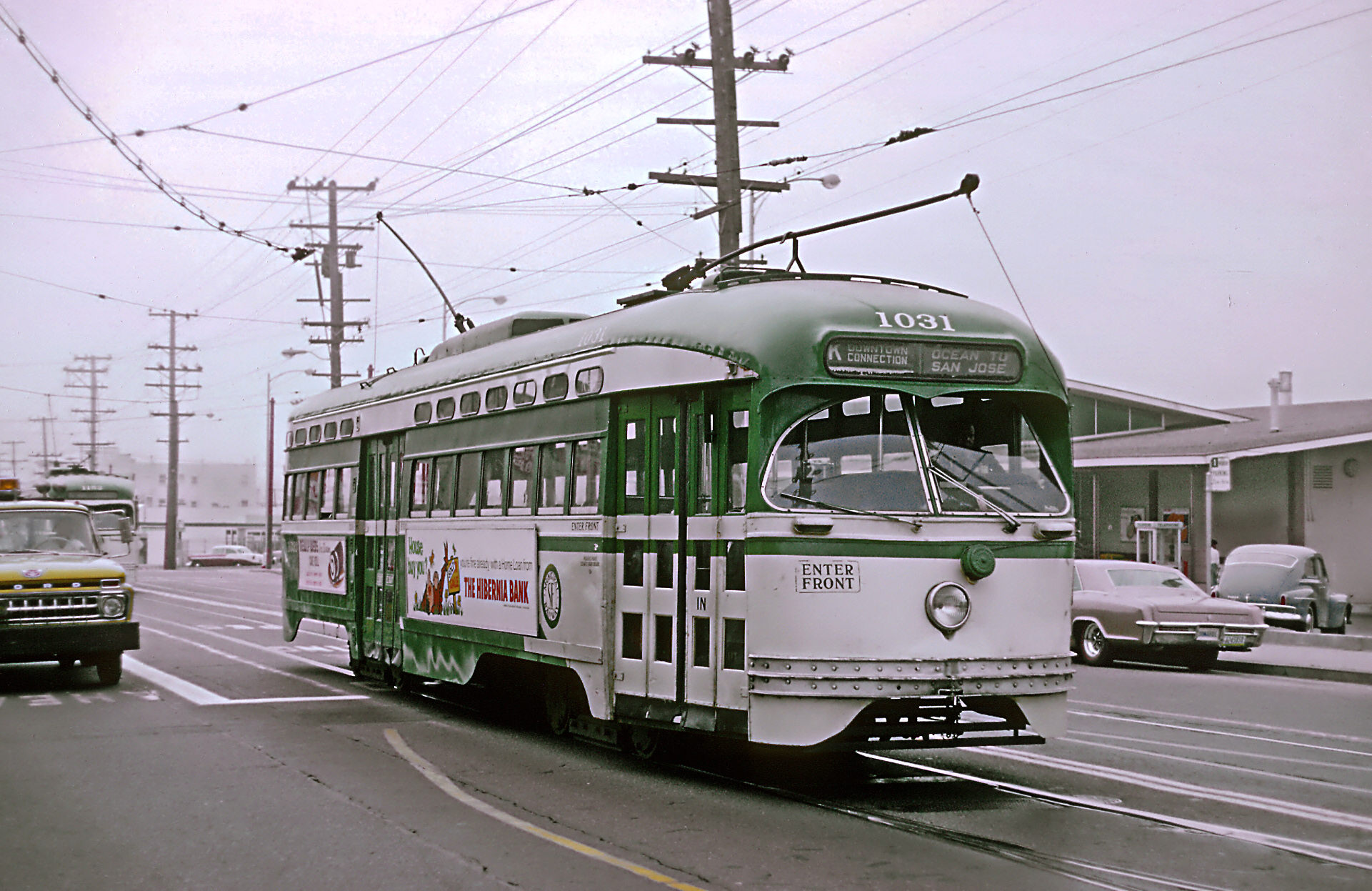
A Muni streetcar at Ocean and Lee nearing Phelan Loop in 1967

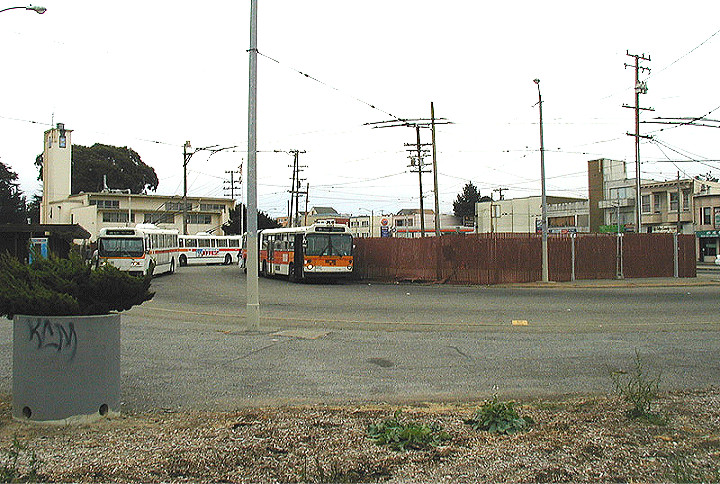
Muni buses at Phelan Loop around 2002

The private Market Street Railway opened a branch — built in just six days — of its Mission Street line along Ocean Avenue to Victoria Street on December 4, 1895 to serve the new Ingleside Racetrack. The line was extended to the Ingleside House (where Ocean Avenue now meets Junipero Serra Boulevard) shortly thereafter. The 1906 earthquake damaged many cable car and streetcar lines; the URR resumed service on the Ocean Avenue (12) line on May 6, 1906.

On November 25, 1918, the city and the struggling URR signed the "Parkside Agreements", which allowed Muni streetcars to use URR trackage on Junipero Serra Boulevard, Ocean Avenue, and Taraval Street, in exchange for a cash payment and shared maintenance costs. The K Ingleside line was extended south on Junipero Serra Boulevard and east on Ocean to Ocean and Miramar on February 21, 1919. Miramar was the terminus of the line until May 18, 1919, when it was extended east on Ocean Avenue and south on Brighton Avenue to Grafton Avenue.

The city purchased the private company (renamed Market Street Railway in 1921) in 1944; route 12 service was removed from Ocean Avenue on April 8, 1945, leaving just the K Ingleside. On April 8, 1945, route 12 service was removed from Ocean Avenue, while every other K Ingleside car was extended on Ocean Avenue and Onondaga Street to Mission Street to provide a direction connection to route 14. In 1952, Muni constructed a loop for the K with a separate busway for the 12 (converted to bus in 1948) on city property north of Ocean Avenue and west of Phelan Avenue, adjacent to the then-new City College. The Brighton Avenue trackage was retired and replaced with the new Phelan Loop on May 18, 1952; the alternate service to Mission Street was cut back to the loop on October 10, 1952.

In the 1970s, Muni rebuilt the non-revenue trackage for regular service so that K Ingleside service could be extended to the new Balboa Park station. The first revenue service to Balboa Park was on April 23, 1979, although service past Phelan Loop did not run at all times until March 17, 1981. Phelan Loop was then retired for streetcar service, replaced with platforms on Ocean Avenue at Lee Street. (The overhead wires and track for the streetcar loop were removed in March and early April 1981, respectively.) However, Muni buses continued using the bus loop because Balboa Park station did not include a bus terminal. By the early 2000s, the loop was part of a section of Ocean Avenue deemed "bleak and uninteresting", in contrast to the commercial district to the west. In 2001, as part of a planning process for the Balboa Park area, the city proposed to build a housing development and public open space on the loop parcel, with buses using a new loop behind an adjacent fire station closer to Phelan Avenue.

The line was closed and replaced by buses from February 2001 to June 7, 2003 for the Ocean Avenue Reconstruction and Improvement Project, a major street repaving and utility replacement project. Muni built new side platforms (traffic islands) on the near side of the cross street, with a short mini-high platform providing access to people with disabilities. In July 2010, Muni received a $6.8 million federal grant to fund the loop relocation. The new loop, City College Terminal, opened on May 6, 2013 for the 8/8BX and 49 routes, which enter the loop from Ocean Avenue and exit onto Phelan Avenue. Housing was soon built on the old loop site; the new open space, Unity Plaza, opened next to the loop in October 2016.

In 2023, the SFMTA began planning work on the K Ingleside Rapid Project, which is intended to increase capacity and reduce travel time on the Ocean Avenue portion of the line. No significant changes are proposed at Lee, as the platforms are already long enough for two-car trains. As of January 2024, "quick-build" implementation of some project elements is planned for early 2024, with construction of the full project taking place from 2027 to 2029.
