= K Ingleside =

Light rail line in San Francisco, California

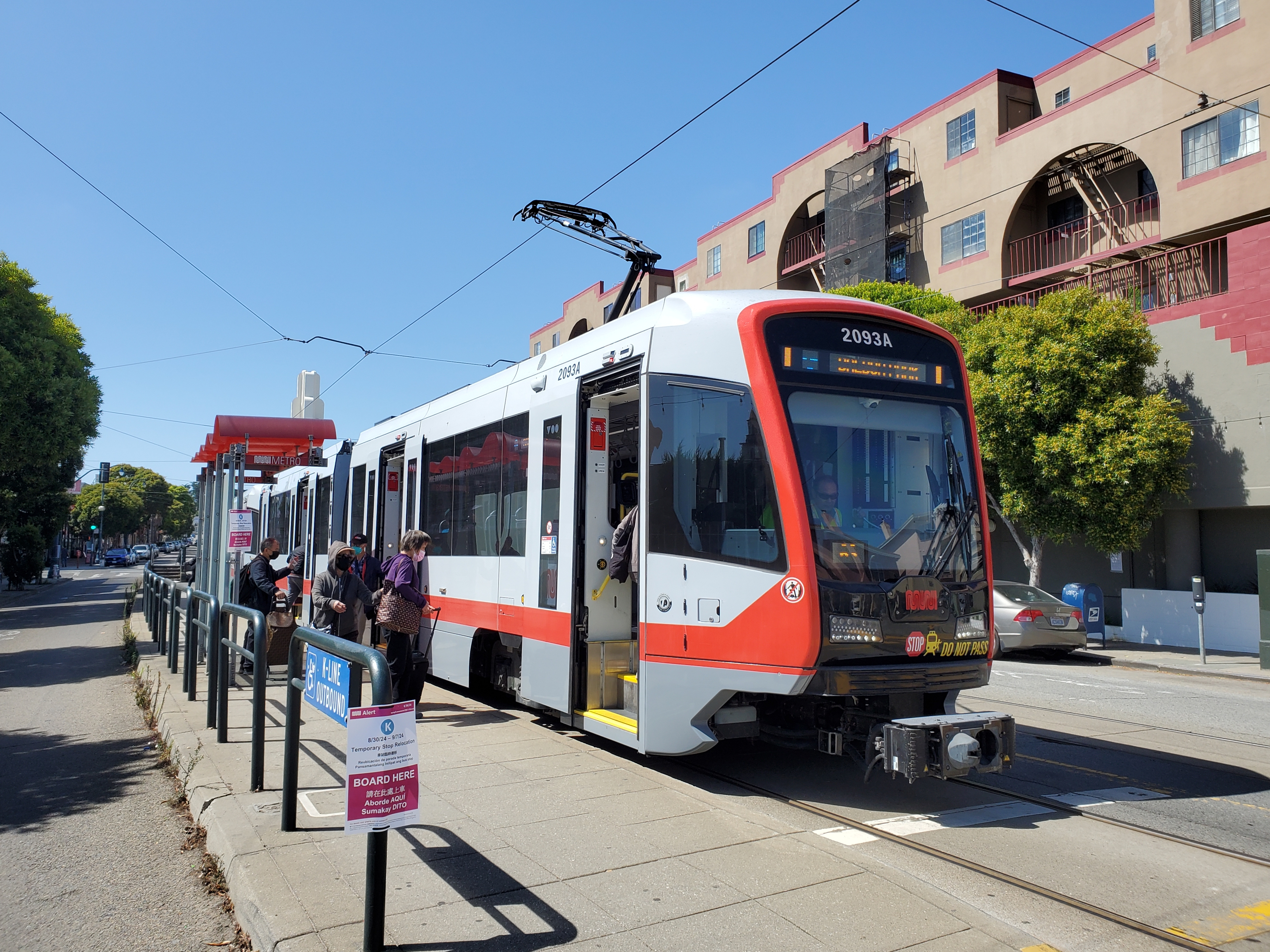
- An outbound train at Ocean and Victoria in 2024

Overview
- Owner: San Francisco Municipal Transportation Agency
- Locale: San Francisco, California
- Termini: Embarcadero station; Balboa Park station
- Stations: 24

Service
- Type: Light rail
- System: Muni Metro
- Operator: San Francisco Municipal Railway
- Rolling stock: Siemens LRV4
- Daily ridership: 14,900 (June 2026)

History
- Opened: February 3, 1918

Technical
- Character: At grade and underground
- Track gauge: 4 ft 8 1/2 in (1,435 mm) standard gauge
- Electrification: Overhead line, 600 V DC
Route map
K Ingleside highlighted in sky

The K Ingleside is a light rail line of the Muni Metro system in San Francisco, California. It mainly serves the West Portal and Ingleside neighborhoods. The line opened on February 3, 1918, and was the first line to use the Twin Peaks Tunnel.

== Route description ==
The outer terminal of the K Ingleside is at Balboa Park station, where it shares a terminal loop plus loading and unloading platforms with the J Church. The line runs in a dedicated median in Ocean Avenue as far as Ocean Avenue/CCSF Pedestrian Bridge station, then in mixed traffic to Junipero Serra and Ocean station. Surface stations are typically boarding islands located between the tracks and the outer traffic lanes. The line again has a short dedicated median on Junipero Serra Boulevard. It joins the M Ocean View at St. Francis Circle station, from where the lines run in mixed traffic to a junction with the L Taraval outside West Portal station. The K Ingleside runs through the Twin Peaks Tunnel and Market Street subway to its inner terminal at Embarcadero station.

=== Operation ===
The K Ingleside begins service at 5 a.m. on weekdays, 6 a.m. Saturdays and 8 a.m. Sundays, with the end of service occurring around 12:30 a.m. each night. Weekday daytime headways are 10 minutes. Weekend daytime headways are 12 minutes.

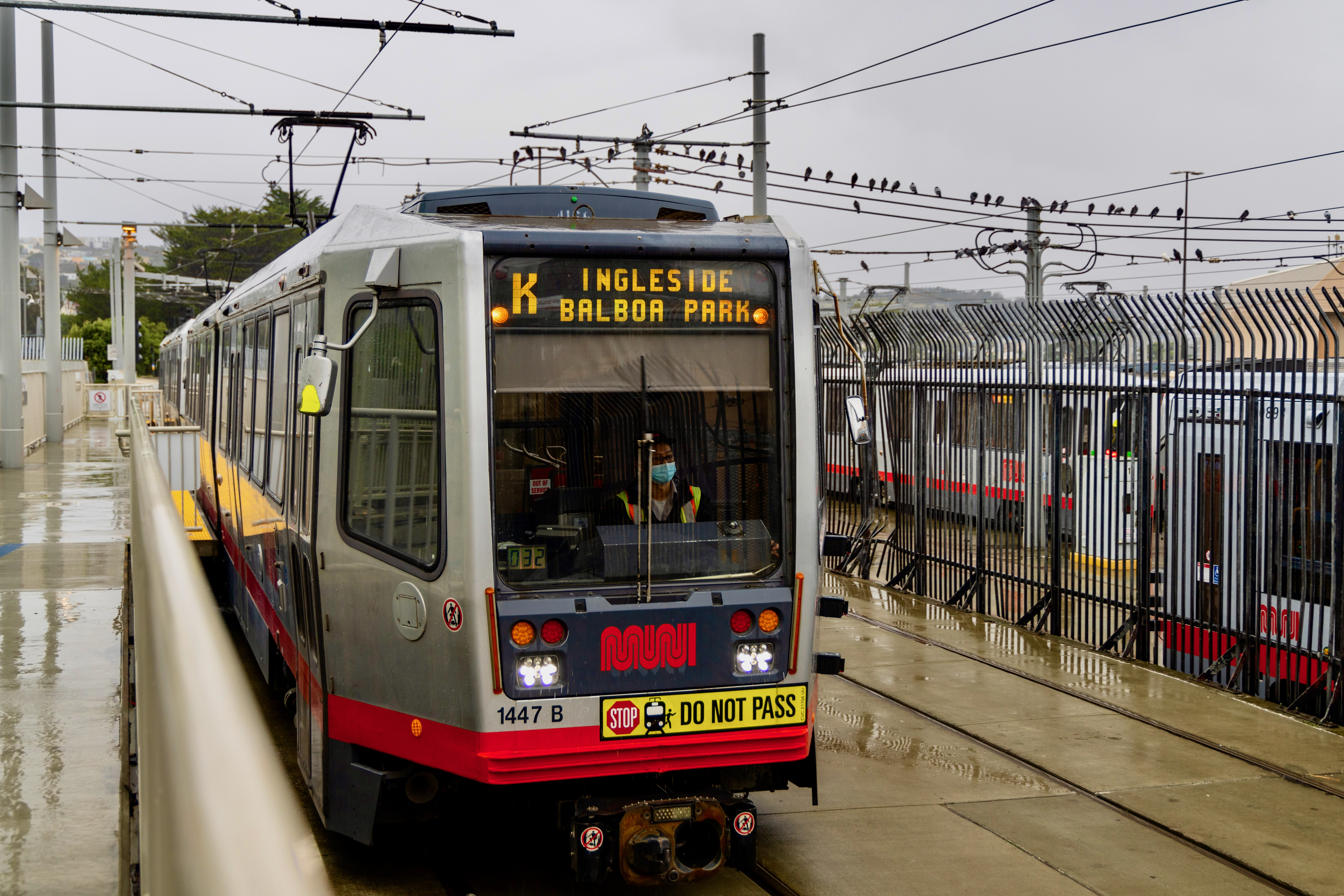
A K Ingleside terminating at Balboa Park Station in 2023

Service is provided by overnight Owl buses during the hours that rail service is not running. The L Owl serves the portion between West Portal and Embarcadero, and the 91 Owl serves the portion between Balboa Park and West Portal. The K Owl bus runs a limited number of trips during late nights and early mornings.

Prior to the COVID-19 pandemic, on weekends, service is provided by K Ingleside Bus, which runs from 5 a.m. until the start of rail service. The bus line largely follows the rail line, but it uses surface streets to parallel sections where the rail line has dedicated rights-of-way.

== History ==
=== Market Street Railway ===
The Market Street Railway opened a branch – built in just six days – of its Mission Street line along Ocean Avenue to Victoria Street on December 4, 1895, to serve the new Ingleside Racetrack. The line was extended to the Ingleside House (where Ocean Avenue now meets Junipero Serra Boulevard) shortly thereafter. The 1906 earthquake damaged many cable car and streetcar lines; in the aftermath, the United Railroads (URR) – successor to the Market Street Railway – closed many cable car lines and expanded the electric streetcar system. The URR resumed service on the Ocean Avenue line on May 6, 1906; the line (route 12) was soon extended to Ocean Beach via Junipero Serra Boulevard and Sloat Boulevard.

=== Municipal Railway ===
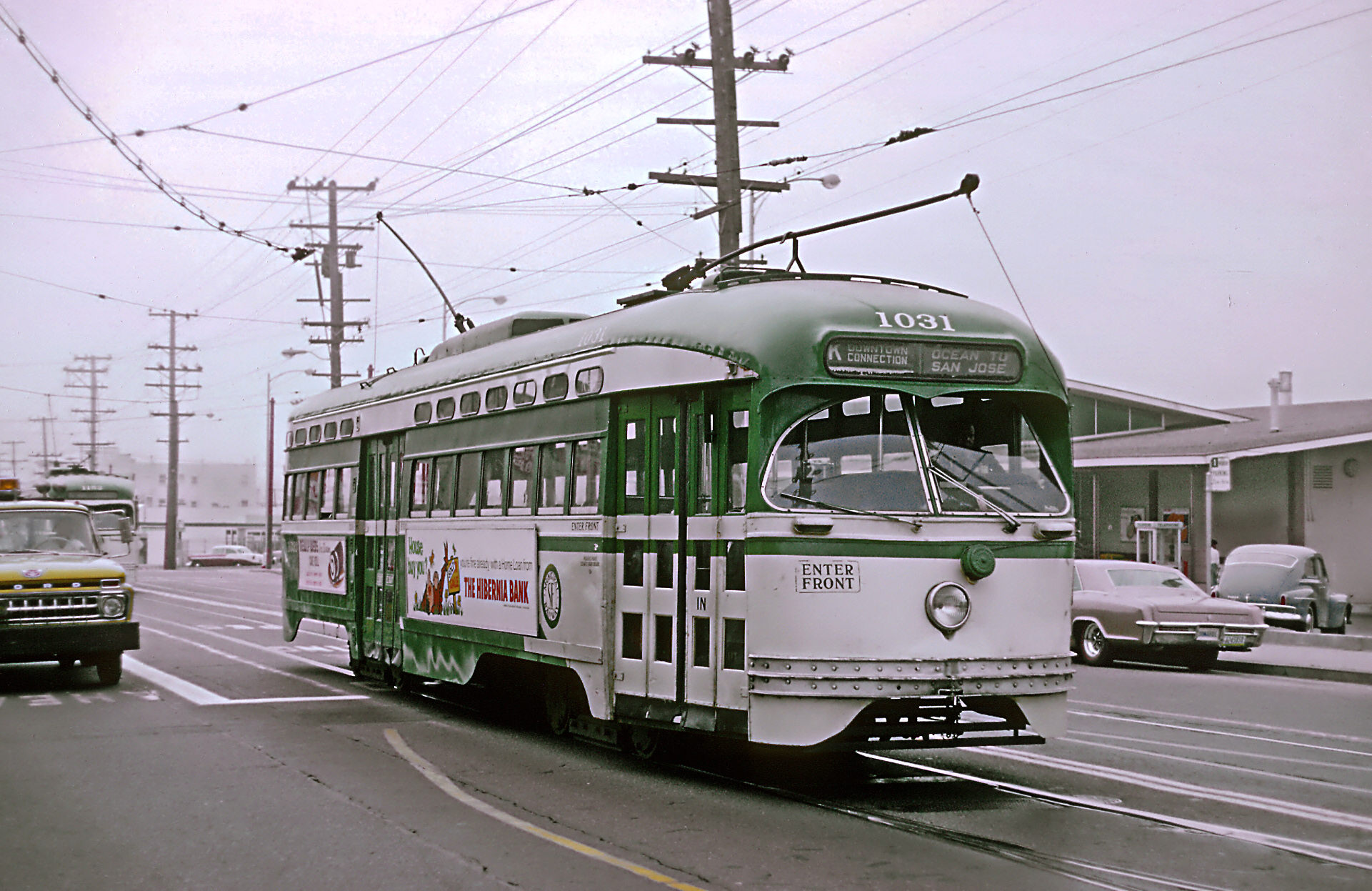
A PCC Streetcar on K Ingleside in 1967

The San Francisco Municipal Railway (Muni) opened its K line along with the Twin Peaks Tunnel on February 3, 1918. The line originally ran from St. Francis Circle station along West Portal Avenue, through the tunnel, along Market Street to Van Ness Avenue (joining the J Church at Church Street), and along existing tracks on Van Ness Avenue to Pine Street. On June 1, 1918, the J and K lines were removed from Van Ness Avenue and extended along Market Street to a loop at the Ferry Building.

The existing URR streetcar service on Ocean Avenue formed a barrier to continued Muni expansion into the Ingleside district. On November 25, 1918, the city and the private URR signed the "Parkside Agreements", which allowed Muni streetcars to use URR trackage on Ocean Avenue as far as Harold Avenue, as well as on Taraval Street, in exchange for a cash payment and shared maintenance costs. The K Ingleside line was extended south on Junipero Serra Boulevard and east on Ocean Avenue to Miramar Avenue on February 21, 1919. On May 18, it was extended several blocks further east to Brighton Avenue, then two blocks south on Grafton to a stub-end terminal at Grafton Avenue.

Every other inbound car on Sundays and holidays continued onto the L Taraval line (rather than to downtown) beginning on April 13, 1919; this ended on October 21, 1923, when the L Taraval line was extended to downtown at all times. Every other inbound car operated to the new East Bay Terminal beginning on January 15, 1939; all cars ran there starting on January 1, 1941. Muni bought the Market Street Railway (ex-URR) in 1944; route 12 service was removed from Ocean Avenue on April 8, 1945, leaving just the K Ingleside. On April 21, every other outbound K car was extended on Ocean Avenue and Onondaga Street to Mission Street, providing a direct connection to route 14.

On January 21, 1951, the 48 crosstown route replaced streetcars on the K and L lines on evenings and holidays. All-rail service returned on May 18, 1952, at which time the trackage on Brighton Avenue was abandoned and replaced with the Phelan Loop at Phelan Avenue near City College. Service past the loop to Mission ended on October 10, 1952, although trackage as far as San Jose Avenue was kept for non-revenue moves to the carhouse.

Service was diverted to Duboce Avenue, Church Street, and 17th Street on December 2, 1972, due to construction of the Market Street subway. On April 23, 1979, the line was lengthened to Balboa Park BART Station. Initially, only supplemental trips running from West Portal and using newly-in-service Boeing Light Rail Vehicles (LRVs) served the new extension, weekdays only, and most K-line service continued to use PCC streetcars running from downtown to Phelan Loop.

The LRV shuttle service ended in February 1980, and PCC-operated service was extended to Balboa Park but lasted only four months before the weekday service was replaced by a temporary K-L crosstown route using LRVs (and weekend service cut back to Phelan Loop). Additional changes to the service configuration followed until finally on December 17, 1980, the K line became operated as a through service from Embarcadero Station to Balboa Park, using LRVs, on weekdays only. Weekend service continued to use PCC cars until September 1982, when the Muni Metro became fully operational.

From February 2001 to June 7, 2003, K Ingleside service was cut back to St. Francis Circle and replaced by buses on Ocean Avenue for the Ocean Avenue Reconstruction and Improvement Project, a major street repaving and utility replacement project. The Muni tracks and overhead power system were replaced, boarding islands were reconstructed, and accessible platforms built at Ocean and Lee.

Following service changes on June 30, 2007, the K Ingleside and the T Third Street lines were spliced together inside the Market Street subway tunnel, though keeping their respective line designations, resulting in an upside-down horseshoe-shaped route from Balboa Park to Bayshore and Sunnydale. At West Portal Station, inbound K trains headed towards downtown changed their signs to the T line; conversely, at Embarcadero Station, T trains headed into downtown changed signs to the K line. The trains showed the ultimate destination of the spliced lines rather than the intermediate "terminus" of the individual line.

=== Later changes ===
Service on the line was modified from June 25 to August 24, 2018 due to the Twin Peaks Tunnel shutdown. The underground section of the line was closed west of Castro station, while the surface section of the K line was through-routed with the J Church line.

On August 25, 2018, at the conclusion of the shutdown, Muni began running permanently two-car trains on the K/T line (as had been used east of Castro during the shutdown). Because of insufficiently-long boarding islands, the rear car was closed on the Ocean Avenue section of the line. Passengers in the rear car on outbound trains were forced to move to the front car at Junipero Serra and Ocean station, and inbound K trains did not open the rear car to passengers until passing Junipero Serra and Ocean.

On March 30, 2020, Muni Metro service was replaced with buses due to the COVID-19 pandemic. Rail service returned on August 22, 2020, with the routes reconfigured to improve reliability in the subway: K Ingleside and L Taraval service were interlined, running between Taraval and Sunset and Balboa Park station; no K Ingleside or L Taraval service entered the subway. The T Third Street line was interlined with the M Ocean View line instead of the K Ingleside. The forced transfer at West Portal was criticized by disability advocates. K Ingleside light-rail service was replaced again by the K Bus on August 25, 2020 due to issues with malfunctioning overhead wire splices and the need to quarantine control center staff after a positive COVID-19 case.

K Ingleside light-rail service resumed again on May 15, 2021; again, through-routed with T Third Street. On January 7, 2023, the T Third Street line was rerouted into the Central Subway ending 16 years of being interlined with the K Ingleside, which resumed terminating at Embarcadero. The K Ingleside and T Third Street were again interlined from February 26 to March 14, 2025, during a closure of the Central Subway.

In 2023, the SFMTA began planning work on the K Ingleside Rapid Project, which was intended to increase capacity and reduce travel time on the Ocean Avenue portion of the line. Planned changes included longer platforms at four stops to allow use of two-car trains, elimination of one stop, and transit lanes between Junipero Serra Boulevard and Lee Avenue. These changes were approved by the SFMTA board on March 5, 2024. "Quick-build" implementation of some project elements, including platform reconstruction, began in August 2024. The stop at Ocean and Westgate / Ocean and Cerritos was closed on September 28, 2024. At that time, the second car began staying open to passengers as far as Ocean Avenue/CCSF Pedestrian Bridge on Balboa Park-bound trains. Construction of the full project is planned to take place from 2027 to 2029.

=== Future ===
Several long-term changes to the line were proposed in 2016. An SFMTA rail strategy plan proposed a 3-mile (4.8 km) light rail line from Balboa Park to Bayshore station, likely to be an extension of the K Ingleside. Its costs were estimated between $260 million and $610 million, with completion in the 2030s. A proposal for a M Ocean View subway included the K using the new subway as far west as St. Francis Circle, with a new portal in the median of Junipero Serra Boulevard.

== Station listing ==
The K Ingleside line stops at concrete boarding islands in the middle of the street next to the tracks. Some stops have raised platforms for accessibility.

| Station/Stop | Neighborhood | Muni Metro lines | Notes and connections |
|---|---|---|---|
| Embarcadero | Financial District | J Church L Taraval M Ocean View N Judah S Shuttle | BART: F Market & Wharves; California; SF Ferry Terminal; Muni: 1, 2, 6, 7X, 9, 9R, 12, 14, 14R, 14X, 21, 30X, 31, 41, 81X, 82X; Golden Gate Transit, Presidio Go Shuttle, SamTrans |
| Montgomery Street | Financial District | J Church L Taraval M Ocean View N Judah S Shuttle | BART: F Market & Wharves; Muni: 2, 3, 5, 5R, 6, 7, 7X, 8, 8AX, 8BX, 9, 9R, 10, 15, 21, 30, 31, 38, 38R, 45, 81X, Geary BRT (38, 38R); AC Transit, Golden Gate Transit, SamTrans |
| Powell Street | Mid-Market, Civic Center, Tenderloin | (at Union Sq/Market St) | BART: F Market & Wharves; Powell–Hyde, Powell–Mason; Muni: 5, 5R, 6, 7, 7X, 8, 8AX, 8BX, 9, 9R, 15, 21, 27, 30, 31, 45, 81X; AC Transit, SamTrans |
| Civic Center/UN Plaza | Mid-Market, Civic Center, Tenderloin | J Church L Taraval M Ocean View N Judah S Shuttle | BART: F Market & Wharves; Muni: 5, 5R, 6, 7, 9, 9R, 19, 21, 83X; AC Transit, Golden Gate Transit, SamTrans |
| Van Ness | Mid-Market, Civic Center, Tenderloin | J Church L Taraval M Ocean View N Judah S Shuttle | F Market & Wharves; Muni: 6, 7, 9, 9R, Van Ness BRT (47, 49, 79X); AC Transit, SamTrans |
| Church | Duboce Triangle, Mission Dolores | (surface stop) | F Market & Wharves; Muni: 22, 37 |
| Castro | Castro District | L Taraval M Ocean View S Shuttle | F Market & Wharves; Muni: 24, 35, 37 |
| Forest Hill | Forest Hill | L Taraval M Ocean View S Shuttle | Muni: 36, 43, 44, 52 |
| West Portal | West Portal | L Taraval M Ocean View S Shuttle | Muni: 48, 57 |
| West Portal and 14th Avenue | West Portal | M Ocean View | Muni: 57 |
| St. Francis Circle | St. Francis Wood | M Ocean View | Muni: 23, 57 |
| Junipero Serra and Ocean | Ingleside Terraces, Balboa Terrace | | Muni: 57 |
| Ocean and San Leandro | Ingleside Terraces, Balboa Terrace | | |
| Ocean and Aptos | Ingleside Terraces, Balboa Terrace | | |
| Ocean and Fairfield (IB); Ocean and Victoria (OB) | Ingleside Terraces | | |
| Ocean and Dorado (IB); Ocean and Jules (OB) | Ingleside, Westwood Park | | |
| Ocean and Miramar | Ingleside, Westwood Park | | |
| Ocean and Lee | Ingleside, Westwood Park | | Muni: 29 |
| Ocean Avenue/CCSF Pedestrian Bridge | Ingleside, Westwood Park | | Serves the City College of San Francisco.; Muni: 8, 8BX, 29, 43, 49 |
| Balboa Park | Balboa Park | J Church M Ocean View | Muni: 8, 8BX, 28R, 29, 43, 49, 54, 714, 88; Commute.org, Daly City Bayshore Shuttle, Sierra Point Shuttle |
