= Ocean and Dorado / Ocean and Jules stations =

Muni Metro light rail stops in San Francisco

Ocean and Dorado Ocean and Jules
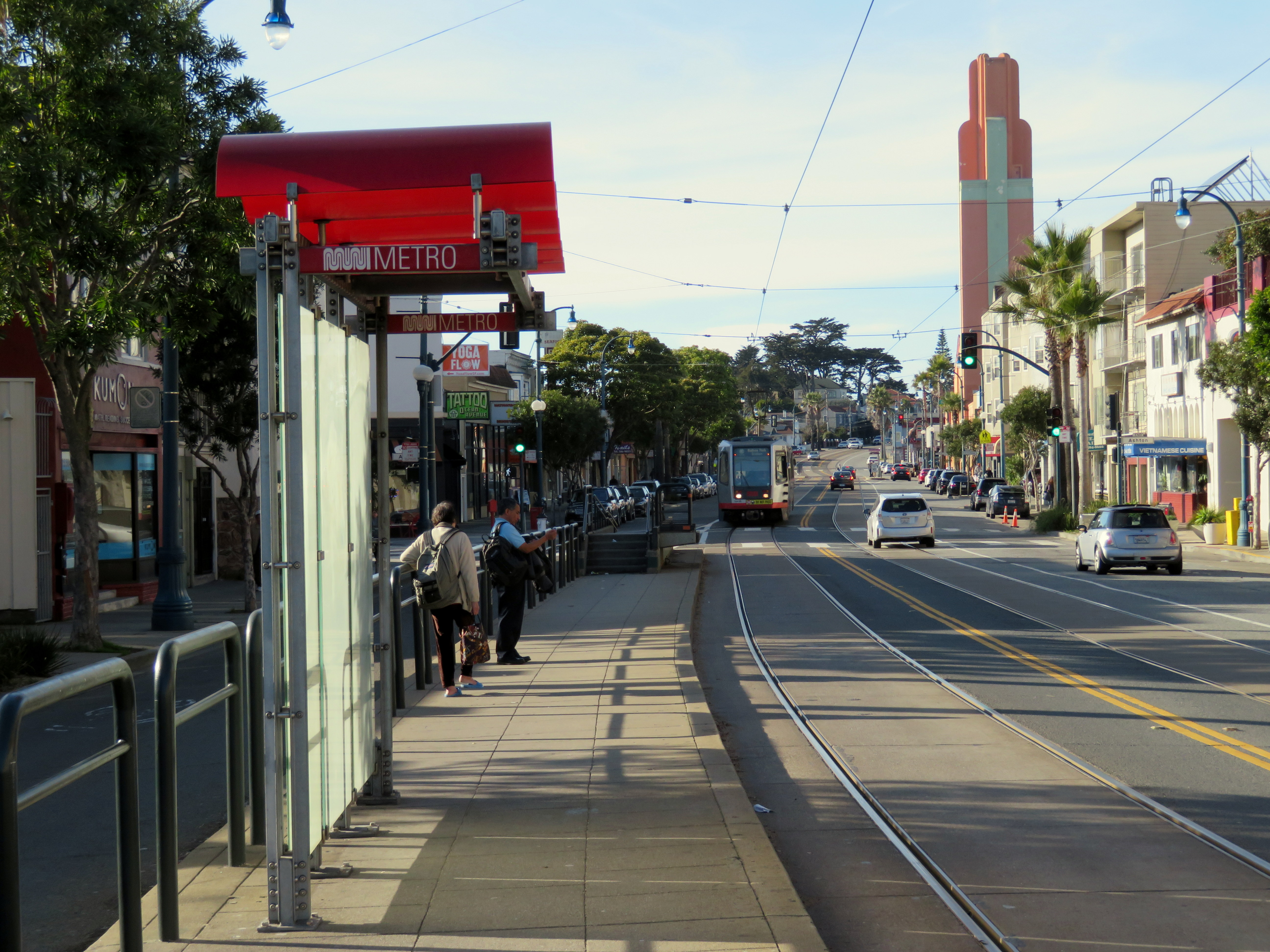
- The outbound platform at Ocean and Jules in January 2018

General information
- Location: Ocean Avenue at Dorado Terrace and Jules Avenue; San Francisco, California
- Coordinates: 37°43′30″N 122°27′40″W
- Platforms: 2 side platforms
- Tracks: 2

Construction
- Accessible: Yes

History
- Opened: December 4, 1895

Services
Preceding station	Muni	Following station
Ocean and Fairfield/Victoria toward Embarcadero	K Ingleside	Ocean and Miramar toward Balboa Park
Location

Ocean and Dorado (inbound) and Ocean and Jules (outbound) are a pair of one-way light rail stops on the Muni Metro K Ingleside line, located between the Mount Davidson and Ingleside neighborhoods of San Francisco, California. The stops consist of one side platform each, with the eastbound (outbound) platform located on Ocean Avenue west of the intersection with Dorado Terrace and Jules Avenue, and the westbound (inbound) platform located east of the intersection. It originally opened in 1895 on the United Railroads 12 line; K Ingleside service began in 1919.

The station is served by the K Bus, K Owl and 91 Owl bus routes, which provide service along the K Ingleside line during the early morning and late night hours respectively when trains do not operate.

== History ==
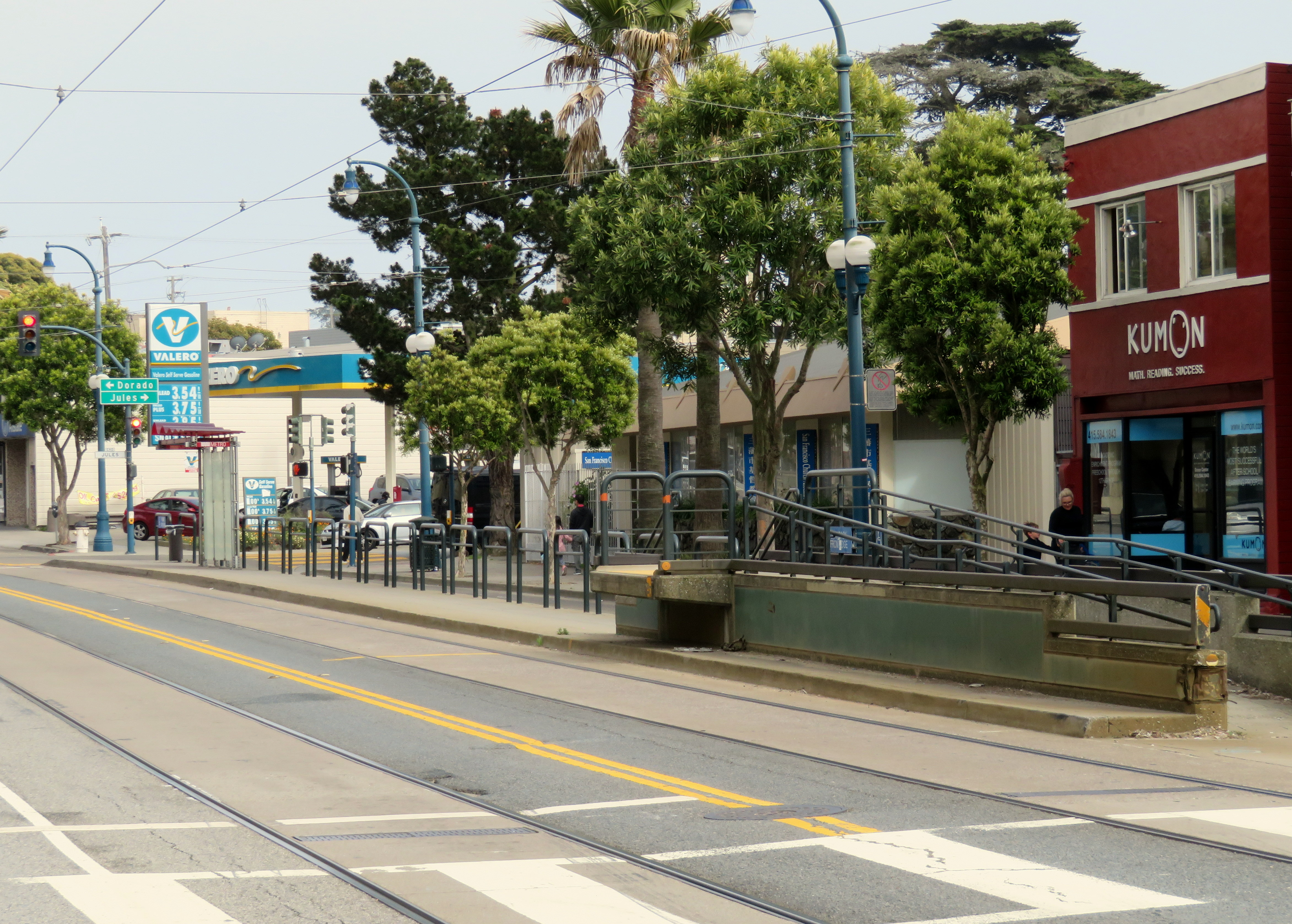
Outbound platform with accessible mini-high section at right

The private Market Street Railway opened a branch – built in just six days – of its Mission Street line along Ocean Avenue to Victoria Street on December 4, 1895, to serve the new Ingleside Racetrack. The line was extended to the Ingleside House (where Ocean Avenue now meets Junipero Serra Boulevard) shortly thereafter. The 1906 earthquake damaged many cable car and streetcar lines; the URR resumed service on the Ocean Avenue (12) line on May 6, 1906.

On November 25, 1918, the city and the struggling URR signed the "Parkside Agreements", which allowed Muni streetcars to use URR trackage on Junipero Serra Boulevard, Ocean Avenue, and Taraval Street, in exchange for a cash payment and shared maintenance costs. The K Ingleside line was extended south on Junipero Serra Boulevard and east on Ocean to Ocean and Miramar on February 21, 1919. The city purchased the private company (renamed Market Street Railway in 1921) in 1944; route 12 service was removed from Ocean Avenue on April 8, 1945, leaving just the K Ingleside.

The line was closed and replaced by buses from February 2001 to June 7, 2003, for the Ocean Avenue Reconstruction and Improvement Project, a major street repaving and utility replacement project. Muni boarding islands were reconstructed at the stations along Ocean Avenue. On December 21, 2019, a motorist fatally crashed into the outbound platform.

In 2023, the SFMTA began planning work on the K Ingleside Rapid Project, which is intended to increase capacity and reduce travel time on the Ocean Avenue portion of the line. No significant changes are proposed at Dorado / Jules, as the platforms are already long enough for two-car trains. As of January 2024, "quick-build" implementation of some project elements is planned for early 2024, with construction of the full project taking place from 2027 to 2029.
