= Route 27 (disambiguation) =

Route 27 may refer to:

- Route 27 (MTA Maryland), a bus route in Baltimore, Maryland
- London Buses route 27
- 27 Bryant, a bus route in San Francisco

== See also ==
- List of highways numbered 27
