= 27 Bryant =

Bus route in San Francisco, California

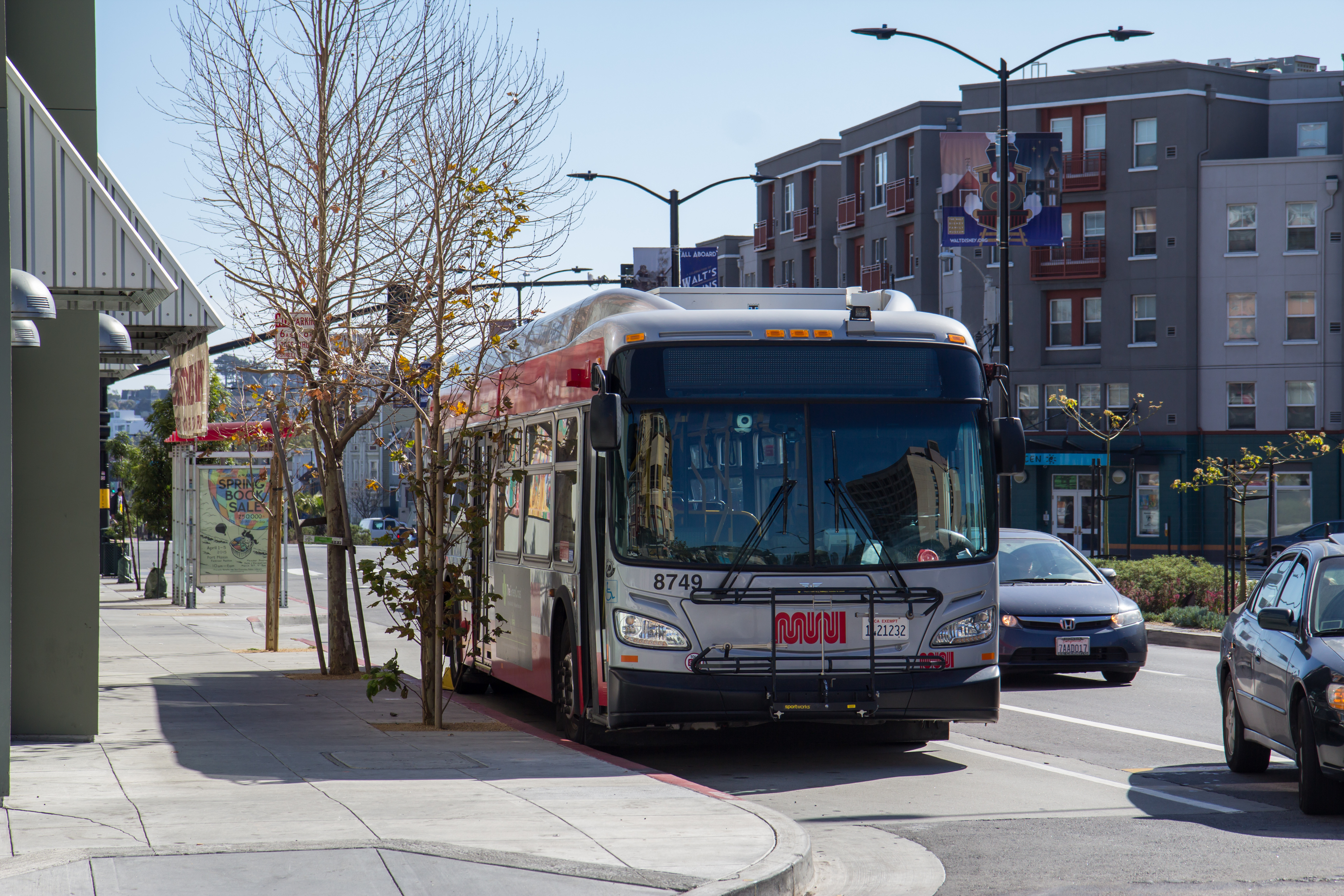
- A 27 Bryant bus terminating on Cesar Chavez Street near Mission Street in 2015

Overview
- Operator: San Francisco Municipal Railway
- Garage: Kirkland, Woods divisions
- Vehicle: New Flyer Xcelsior XDE40 (40 ft low-floor Diesel-Electric hybrid buses); Nova Bus LFSe+
- Began service: August 24, 1983

Route
- Locale: San Francisco, California
- Start: Jackson and Van Ness
- End: 24th and Mission
- Length: 5.7 miles (9.2 km)

Service
- Frequency: 15m
- Weekend frequency: 20m
- Daily ridership: 5,600 (June 2024)
- Transfers: 25
- Map: 27 Bryant Map

27 Bryant is a bus line operated by the San Francisco Municipal Railway. It connects Nob Hill to the Mission District via the Tenderloin and South of Market.

== History ==
The line began service on August 24, 1983 as an amalgamation of the former 27 Noe and 25 San Bruno.

Service was temporarily suspended between April 2020 and January 2021 due to the COVID-19 pandemic. Around mid-August in 2020, Tenderloin residents rallied to demand the return of the 27 Bryant and 31 Balboa lines due to that neighborhood not having restored public transit.

== 27 Bryant Transit Reliability Project ==
The 27 Bryant Transit Reliability Project is a project for reliability and traffic safety on the 27 line. This project focuses north of Market in the Tenderloin and Nob Hill neighborhoods where the 27 experiences many delays and extremely slow travel times. On April 16, 2019, the SFMTA Board of Directors approved this project.

In early September 2019, the SFMTA received a Core Values Award from the International Association for Public Participation (IAP2) USA for "Respect for Diversity, Inclusion and Culture."

=== Phase 1 ===
In August 2019, a permanent route change on the 27 went into effect on August 10, 2019, removing 11 stops and rerouting an outbound segment of the 27 line on Jones Street.

==== COVID-19 ====
Due to the COVID-19 pandemic, the scope of the project was adjusted in January 2021, which included the restoration of the 27 Bryant after service was temporarily suspended. The 27 was restored and the routing was modified on January 23, 2021, using the 19's temporary emergency transit lanes on 7th and 8th Streets to keep buses moving via traffic congestion and easily manage crowding.

== Route description ==
=== Operation ===
During the COVID-19 pandemic, service now operates between 6 a.m. to 10 p.m. every day. Service has no overnight Owl bus line when service is not in operation after 10 p.m. through midnight. The frequency is every 15 minutes on weekdays; the frequency is every 20 minutes on the weekends.

=== Bus stop listing ===
Prior to COVID-19
Inbound Stop	Outbound Stop	Neighborhoods	Notes and Connections
Jackson and Van Ness (Inbound terminus)		Pacific Heights	Muni: 12, 49, 90 Owl; Golden Gate Transit
Jackson and Polk	Pacific and Van Ness	Nob Hill	Muni: 12, 49, 90 Owl; Golden Gate Transit
Jackson and Hyde	Polk and Washington	Nob Hill	
Leavenworth and Jackson	Washington and Larkin	Nob Hill	
Leavenworth and Clay	Hyde and Clay	Nob Hill	Muni: 1
Leavenworth and Sacramento		Nob Hill; Lower Nob Hill	Muni: 1
Leavenworth and California	Hyde and California	Nob Hill; Lower Nob Hill	California Street line
Leavenworth and Pine	Hyde and Pine	Nob Hill; Lower Nob Hill	
Leavenworth and Bush	Bush and Hyde	Nob Hill; Lower Nob Hill	Serves the Saint Francis Memorial Hospital.
Leavenworth and Sutter	Jones and Sutter	Nob Hill; Lower Nob Hill	
Leavenworth and Post	Jones and Post	Nob Hill; Lower Nob Hill	
Leavenworth and Geary	Jones and Geary	Nob Hill; Lower Nob Hill	Inbound: Muni: 38/38R | Outbound: Muni: 38
Leavenworth and O'Farrell	Jones and O'Farrell	Tenderloin	Inbound: Muni: 38 | Outbound: Muni: 38/38R
	Jones and Ellis	Tenderloin	
Ellis and Jones	Eddy and Jones	Tenderloin	Outbound: Muni: 31
Ellis and Taylor	Eddy and Taylor	Tenderloin	Outbound: Muni: 31
Ellis and Mason	Eddy and Mason	Tenderloin	Outbound: Muni: 31
Cyril Magnin and Market		Tenderloin	BART and at Powell Street station.; , Powell-Hyde, Powell-Mason lines; Muni: 5, 5R, 6, 7, 7X, 9, 9R, 21, 31, 81X, Muni Metro Owl Buses; AC Transit; Golden Gate Transit; SamTrans
5th and Minna	5th and Mission	SoMa	Serves San Francisco Chronicle and University of the Pacific.; Muni: 14, 14R
5th and Howard		SoMa	
5th and Folsom		SoMa	Muni: 12
	Harrison and 5th	SoMa	Muni: 12
Folsom and 6th		SoMa	Muni: 12
6th and Bryant	Harrison and 6th	SoMa	Inbound: Muni: 8, 8AX, 8BX, 14X, 47; Outbound: Muni: 8, 8AX, 8BX, 12, 14X, 47
7th and Bryant	Harrison and 7th	SoMa	Inbound: Serves the Hall of Justice. Muni: 19, 47; Outbound: Muni: 12, 19, 47
8th and Bryant	Harrison and 8th	SoMa	Inbound: Muni: 19, 47; Outbound: Muni: 12, 19, 47
9th and Bryant		SoMa	Serving Bed Bath & Beyond and other stores nearby.; Muni: 47
	11th and Harrison	SoMa	Muni: 9, 9R, 12, 47, 90 Owl
Bryant and Division		SoMa	Muni: 9, 47, 90 Owl
	Bryant and Alabama	Mission District	
Bryant and 16th		Mission District	Muni: 22, 33, 55
Bryant and 17th		Mission District	Serves the KQED Television station and the Potrero Division.
	Bryant and Mariposa	Mission District	Serves the KQED Television station and the Potrero Division.
Bryant and 18th		Mission District	
Bryant and 19th		Mission District	
Bryant and 20th		Mission District	
Bryant and 21st		Mission District	These stops are adjacent to the San Francisco General Hospital.
Bryant and 22nd		Mission District	These stops are adjacent to the San Francisco General Hospital.
Bryant and 23rd		Mission District	These stops are adjacent to the San Francisco General Hospital.
Bryant and 24th		Mission District	Muni: 48
Bryant and 25th		Mission District	
Bryant and 26th		Mission District	
Cesar Chavez and Florida		Mission District	
Cesar Chavez and Harrison		Mission District	Serves Leonard R. Flynn Elementary School and Precita Park.
Cesar Chavez and Folsom		Mission District	Muni: 12, 67
26th and South Van Ness		Mission District	
26th and Mission		Mission District	Muni: 14, 49
Valencia and Cesar Chavez		Mission District	Serves the Mission Bernal Campus.; Muni: 12, 36
Cesar Chavez and Bartlett		Mission District	Muni: 12, 14, 49
