= K/T line =

K/T line may refer to:

- The K/T boundary or the Cretaceous–Paleogene boundary, a geological signature that defines the end of the Mesozoic era.
- The K Ingleside and T Third Street lines of San Francisco's Muni Metro light rail system, which operated as a single line spliced together through the city's downtown at various times from 2007 to 2023.
