= Ocean and Miramar station =

Muni Metro light rail stop in San Francisco

Ocean and Miramar
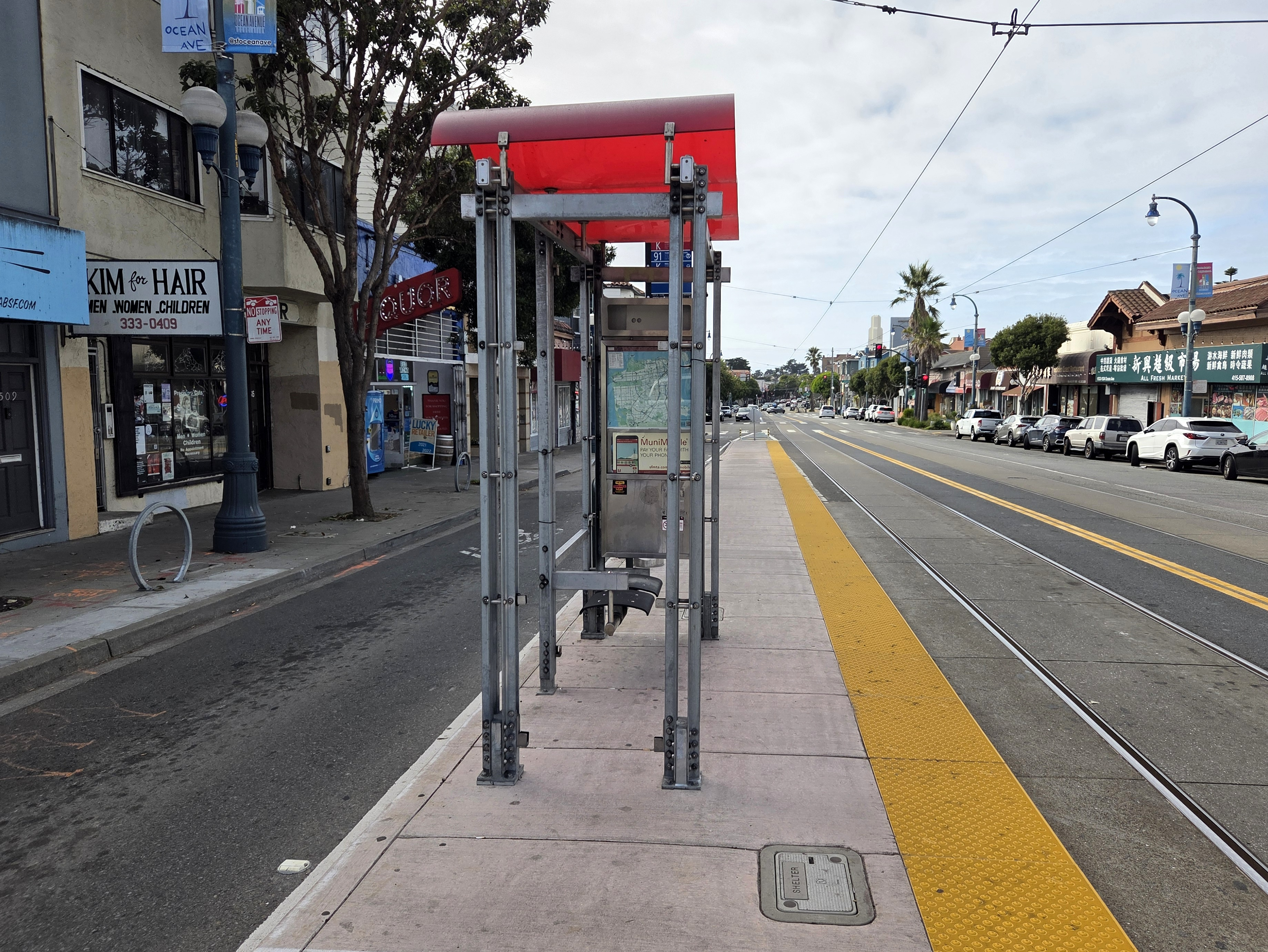
- The outbound platform at Ocean and Miramar in 2025

General information
- Location: Ocean Avenue at Miramar Avenue; San Francisco, California
- Coordinates: 37°43′28″N 122°27′30″W
- Platforms: 2 side platforms
- Tracks: 2

Construction
- Accessible: No

History
- Opened: December 4, 1895
- Rebuilt: 2024

Services
Preceding station	Muni	Following station
Ocean and Dorado/Jules toward Embarcadero	K Ingleside	Ocean and Lee toward Balboa Park
Location

Ocean and Miramar is a light rail stop on the Muni Metro K Ingleside line, located between the Westwood Park and Ingleside neighborhoods of San Francisco, California, United States. The stop consists of two side platforms, with the eastbound (outbound) platform located on Ocean Avenue west of the intersection with Miramar Avenue and the westbound (inbound) platform located east of the intersection. It originally opened in 1895 on the United Railroads 12 line; K Ingleside service began in 1919.

The station is served by the K Bus, K Owl and 91 Owl bus routes, which provide service along the K Ingleside line during the early morning and late night hours respectively when trains do not operate.

== History ==
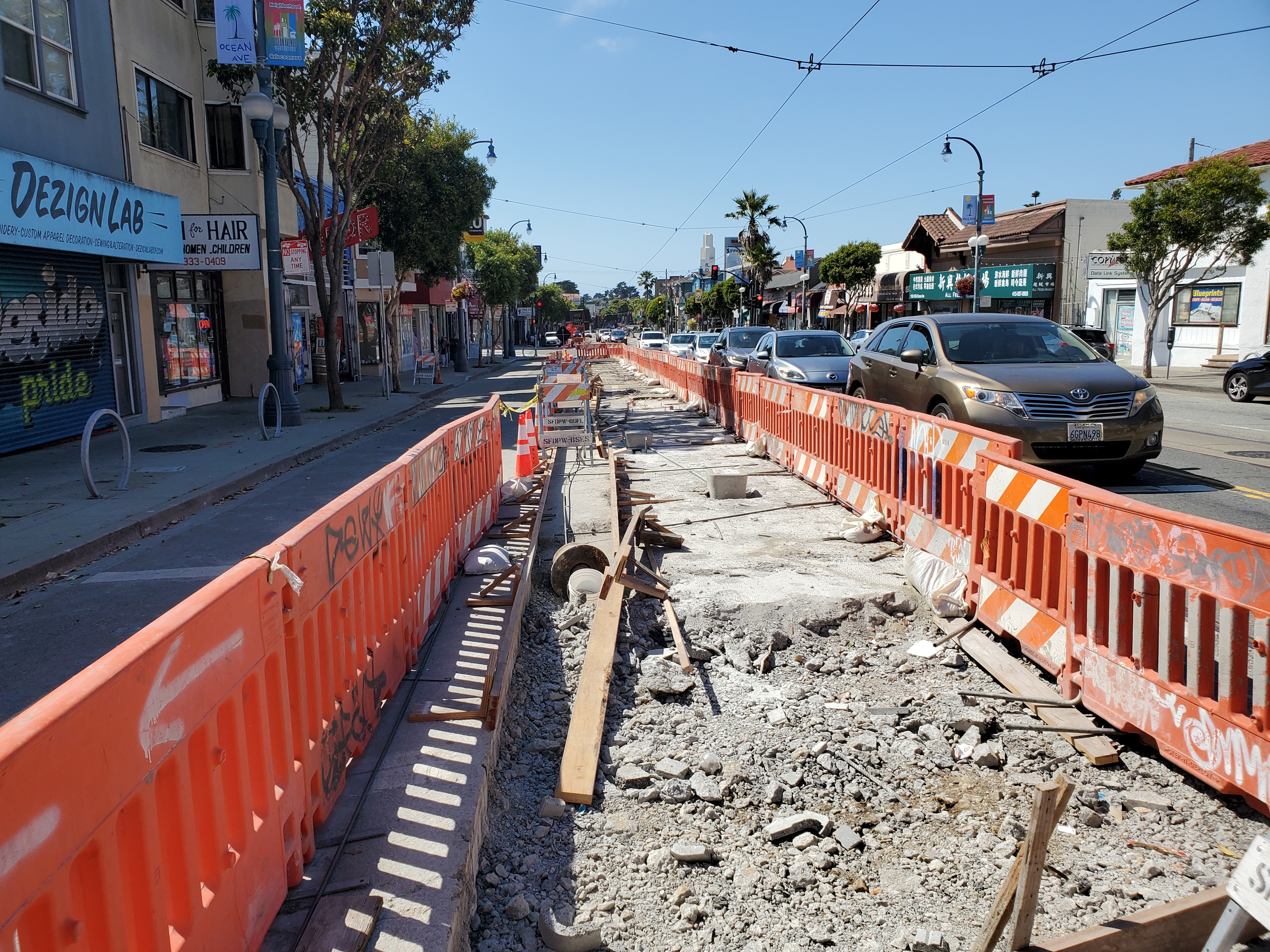
Reconstruction of the outbound platform in August 2024

The private Market Street Railway opened a branch – built in just six days – of its Mission Street line along Ocean Avenue to Victoria Street on December 4, 1895, to serve the new Ingleside Racetrack. The line was extended to the Ingleside House (where Ocean Avenue now meets Junipero Serra Boulevard) shortly thereafter. The 1906 earthquake damaged many cable car and streetcar lines; the URR resumed service on the Ocean Avenue (12) line on May 6, 1906.

On November 25, 1918, the city and the struggling URR signed the "Parkside Agreements," which allowed Muni streetcars to use URR trackage on Junipero Serra Boulevard, Ocean Avenue, and Taraval Street, in exchange for a cash payment and shared maintenance costs. The K Ingleside line was extended south on Junipero Serra Boulevard and east on Ocean to Ocean and Miramar on February 21, 1919. Miramar was the terminus of the line until May 18, 1919, when it was extended east on Ocean Avenue and south on Brighton Avenue to Grafton Avenue. The city purchased the private company (renamed Market Street Railway in 1921) in 1944; route 12 service was removed from Ocean Avenue on April 8, 1945, leaving just the K Ingleside.

The line was closed and replaced by buses from February 2001 to June 7, 2003 for the Ocean Avenue Reconstruction and Improvement Project, a major street repaving and utility replacement project. Muni boarding islands were reconstructed at the stations along Ocean Avenue.

In 2023, the SFMTA began planning work on the K Ingleside Rapid Project, which is intended to increase capacity and reduce travel time on the Ocean Avenue portion of the line. An initial proposal shown in April 2023 included longer platforms at four stops, including Miramar, so that the second car of two-car trains can be used. Updated proposals in July 2023 and January 2023 also included the longer platforms at Miramar. The outbound platform was rebuilt from August 22 to September 7, 2024, as part of "quick-build" implementation of some project elements. Construction of the full project is planned to take place from 2027 to 2029.
