= 43 Masonic =

San Francisco bus line

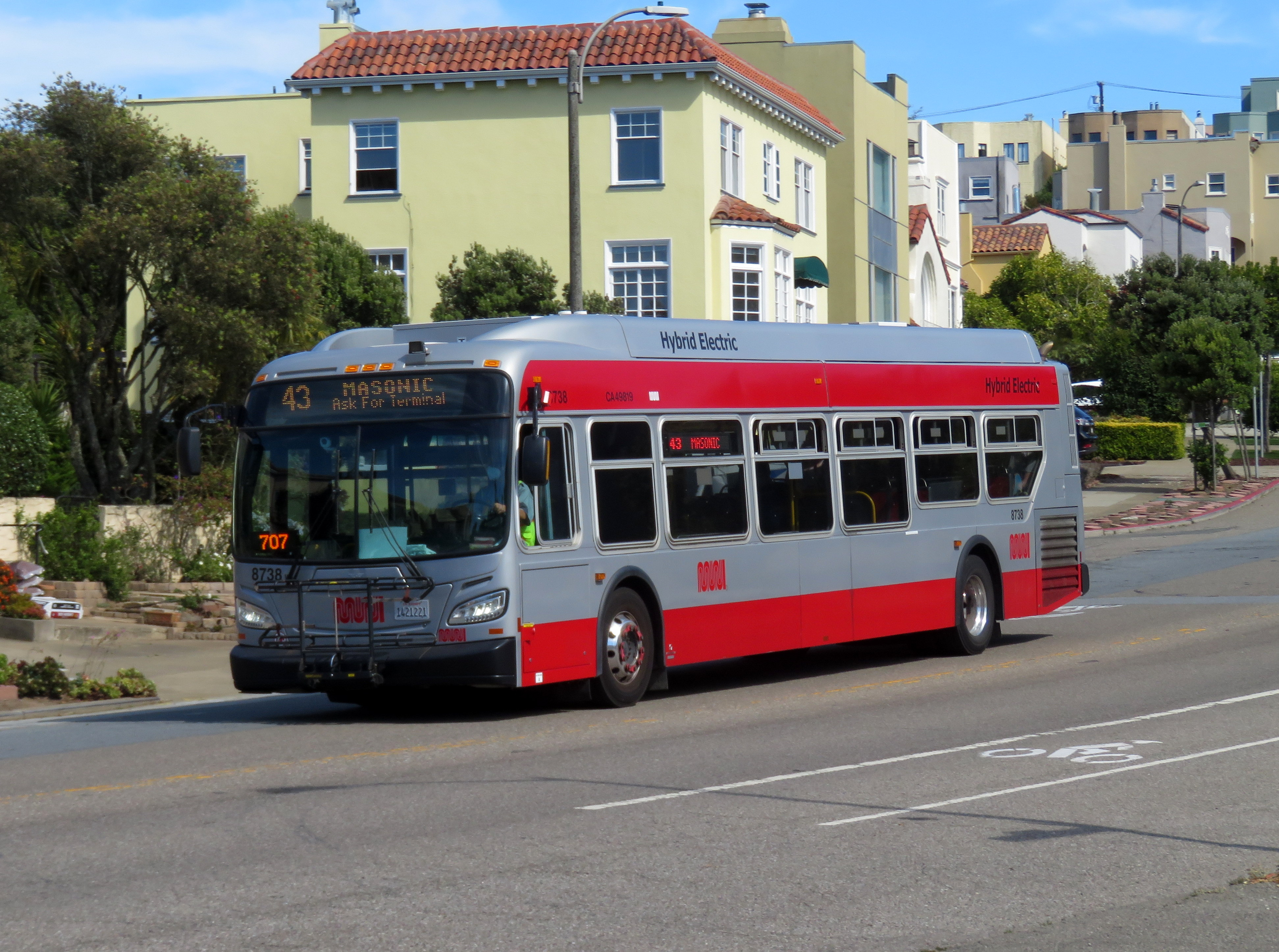

Overview
- Operator: San Francisco Municipal Railway
- Vehicle: New Flyer XDE40
- Began service: 1979–1983

Route
- Locale: San Francisco, California
- Start: Fort Mason
- Via: Masonic Avenue and The Presidio
- End: Munich and Geneva
- Length: 12.4 miles (20.0 km)
- Stops: 88

Service
- Frequency: Every 12–15 minutes
- Weekend frequency: Every 20 minutes
- Daily ridership: 12,600 (2019)
- Map: Route map on Muni website

The 43 Masonic is a north–south bus line operated by the San Francisco Municipal Transportation Agency (SFMTA, or Muni). Considered by some locals as one of Muni's most scenic bus routes, the line runs from the Excelsior District to Fort Mason through the Presidio, Pacific Heights, the Haight–Ashbury, Forest Hill, and Ingleside.

== Service ==
The 43 Masonic runs from the early morning until late night, though it is not a 24-hour bus line and is not a part of Muni's Owl Service. The bus line's home garage is the Kirkland bus yard near Pier 39. Locals have noted the bus for being not as quick as some other Muni routes, and some of the stops are arbitrary addresses. The bus is also described within the city as generally being cleaner and less crowded than other routes.

=== Route ===
The route begins at the intersection of Munich Street and Geneva Avenue in the Excelsior District, traveling on Chicago Way before traveling on Munich (northbound)/Prague Street (southbound), with the two routes meeting on Naples Ave. From there, both directions of the 43 travel together on Geneva Ave to Ingleside, intermittently stopping at Balboa Park station and connecting to four of the five BART lines. At the intersection of Geneva and Ocean Ave, the 43 turns to Frida Khalo Way and the center of City College of San Francisco's campus and snakes up to Monterey Blvd via Judson and Genessee (for southbound buses) or Judson and Forester (for northbound buses). After a stint on Monterey Ave, the bus skirts around Mt. Davidson Park and travels on Portola Avenue up to the Twin Peaks, intersecting the K Ingleside and M Ocean View metro lines at Forest Hill station along the way. Much of the 43's journey near the Twin Peaks travel using Laguna Honda Blvd. The 43 then proceeds to meet with its first of two intersections with the N Judah at Judah St and 9th Avenue, before running parallel to the N on both Judah street and Parnassus avenue, before turning on Cole Street to intersect with the N Judah for the second and final at Cole's intersection with Carl Street. The 43 subsequently proceeds to serve the center of Haight Ashbury via Haight Street, which takes it to Masonic Avenue. Traveling up Masonic for nearly the rest of the street northbound, the 43 serves the Panhandle and USF, following Presidio Avenue up until reaching the Presidio itself. At the Presidio Transit Center, the 43 turns to travel along Lombard street before making its final turn onto Laguna Street, terminating at Fort Mason.

== History ==
The 14 Roosevelt bus route was renumbered to 43 in February 1949. The 43 was rerouted between 1979 and 1983 to form a crosstown route in order to help modernize the Muni system; at this time the route name was changed to 43 Masonic. In 1997, the 43 Masonic was noted by students as a bus line prone to muggings.

In 2019, the 43 Masonic was the 44th best performing Muni line out of the agency's 63 routes; the bus had an on-time rating of 54 percent, though the bus was logged to be "very late" 17 percent of the time.

The 43 Masonic, along with many other bus and streetcar lines, was shut down during the COVID-19 pandemic in March 2020. It was restored in June that year, albeit shortened to terminate at Masonic and Geary; such shortening was a source of controversy for locals, especially those living in the Cole Valley. By December 2021, the 43 Masonic had only recovered 31% of its pre-pandemic ridership. In May 2022, Muni began drafting plans to restore services that were previously shut down or shortened pending another COVID surge; in July, the 43 was restored to its pre-pandemic route, though modified to include a stop to the recently opened Presidio Tunnel Tops.
