= 21 Hayes =

Trolleybus line in San Francisco, California, United States

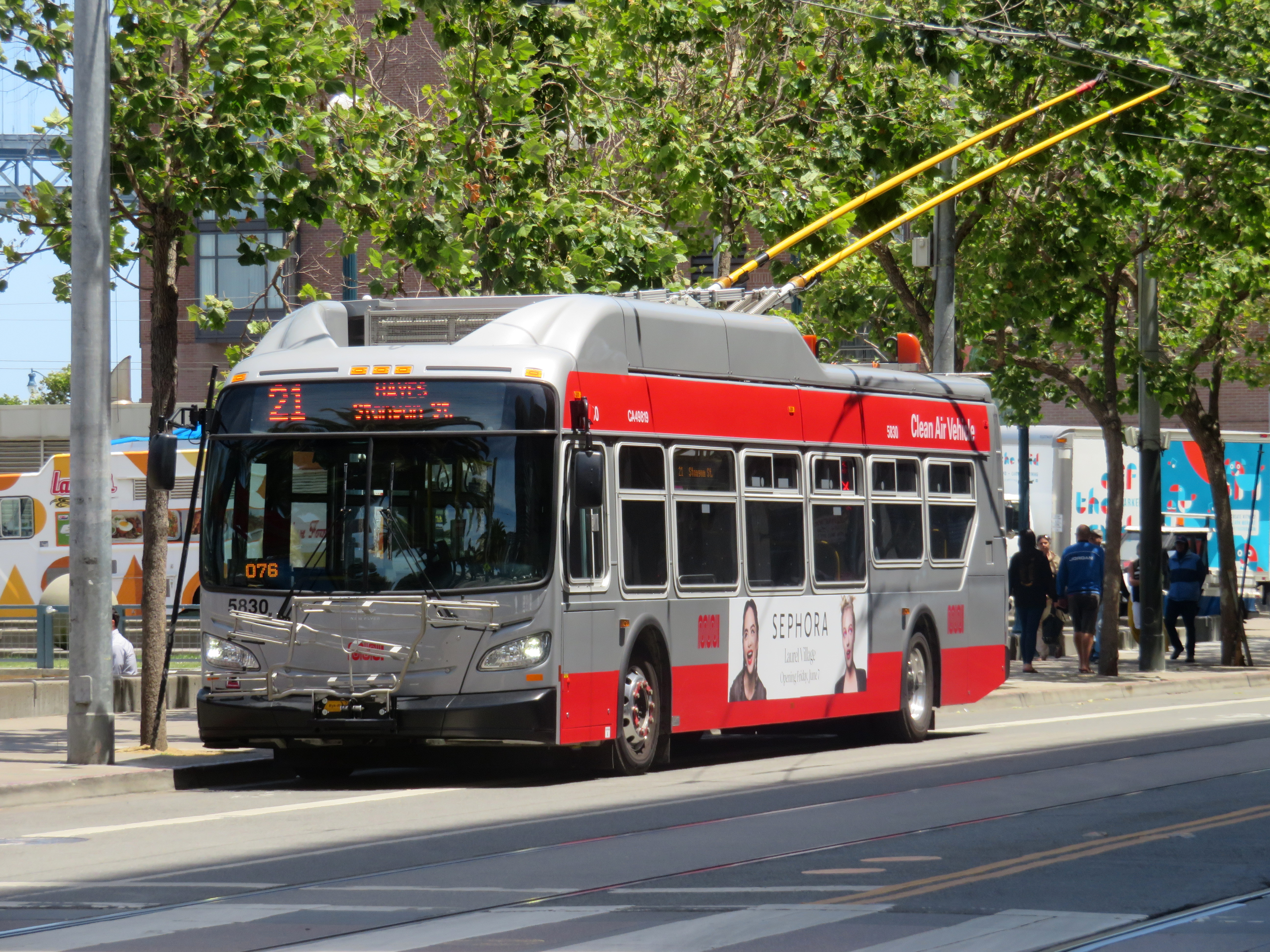
- 21 trolleybus at Ferry Plaza, July 2019

Overview
- System: Muni trolleybus network
- Operator: San Francisco Municipal Railway
- Vehicle: New Flyer XT40; New Flyer XDE40
- Began service: 1860 (horsecar); 1906 (electric streetcar)
- Ended service: June 20, 2025

Route
- Locale: San Francisco, California
- Start: Fulton and Stanyan; Fulton and 8th Avenue (nights and weekends)
- Via: Hayes Street
- End: Hyde and Grove
- Length: 3.2 mi (5.1 km)

Service
- Level: Daily
- Daily ridership: 6,600 (2019)
- Map: 21 Hayes Map

21 Hayes was a trolleybus line operated by the San Francisco Municipal Railway (Muni). It connected the Civic Center to the neighborhoods northeast of Golden Gate Park in San Francisco. On June 21, 2025, the 21 Hayes was merged with the 6 Haight/Parnassus.

== History ==
Horsecar service was established on Hayes Street in 1860 by Thomas Hayes. By the time the Market Street Railway was incorporated in 1883, the Hayes line had been rebuilt to run cable cars and terminated at the Ferry Building.

The 1906 San Francisco earthquake crippled the line. Though it was back in operation as an electrified streetcar less than two months after the disaster, the steep grade between Pierce and Scott was unsuitable for electric traction. United Railroads (successor to the Market Street Railway) compensated for this by establishing two new routes; the new "Hayes and Ellis" line ran from Ellis and Market outbound on Ellis, Divisadero, Hayes, and Stanyan to terminate at Fulton. This line was assigned the number 21 in 1911. A cutting to ease the grade between Pierce and Scott was cleared in 1914, allowing through-running the whole length of Hayes. In the 1930s, the line was extended west and north to terminate at 8th and Clement in the Inner Richmond. Streetcar service ended on June 5, 1948 and the line was converted to trolleybus operations the following year.

Service was discontinued in March 2020 amid the COVID-19 pandemic. The line temporarily returned to operation in July 2022, though with motor coaches and the inbound terminal truncated to Market Street. Due to a high budget crisis as part of the Summer 2025 Muni Service Cuts, the 6 Haight/Parnassus and 21 were merged together on June 21, 2025.
