= 49 Van Ness/Mission =

Trolleybus line in San Francisco, California

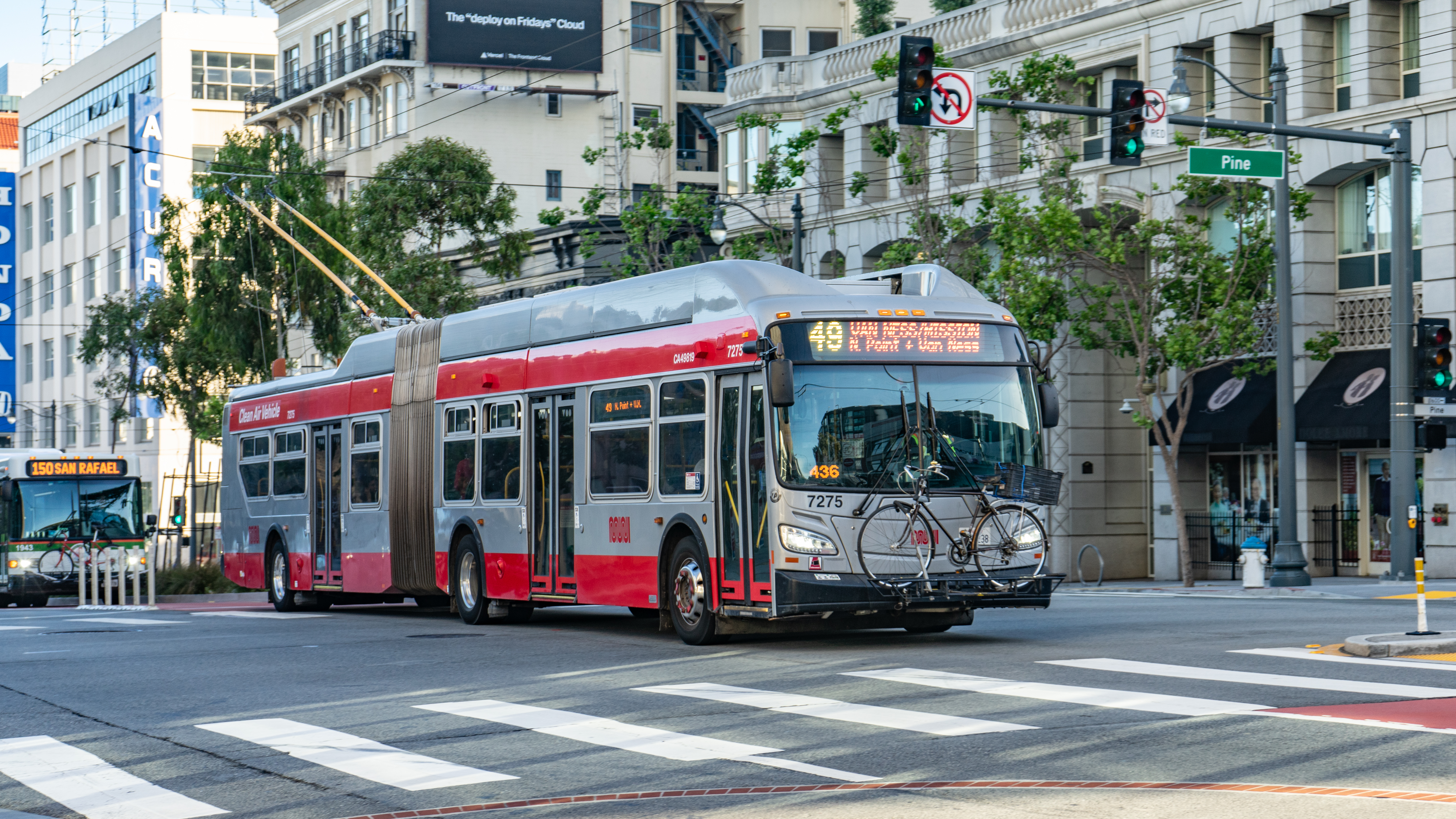
- A route 49 trolleybus on Van Ness Avenue in June 2024

Overview
- System: Muni trolleybus network
- Operator: San Francisco Municipal Railway
- Vehicle: New Flyer XDE60
- Predecessors: 12 Ocean

Route
- Locale: San Francisco, California
- Start: Van Ness and North Point
- Via: Van Ness Avenue, Mission Street, Ocean Avenue
- End: City College (Unity Plaza)
- Length: 6.9 miles (11.1 km)
- Daily ridership: 25,000 (2019)
- Map: 49 Van Ness/Mission Map

49 Van Ness/Mission is a trolleybus line operated by the San Francisco Municipal Railway (Muni).

== Route description ==
The route runs primarily on Van Ness Avenue, Mission Street, and Ocean Avenue.

The line begins at the intersection of Van Ness Avenue and North Point Street, near Aquatic Park and Fort Mason. It runs south on Van Ness until just past Market Street, where Van Ness becomes South Van Ness Avenue. It then joins the 14 Mission's route along Mission Street (and Otis Street for two blocks southbound), serving the same stops as the 14 throughout the Mission District and in much of the Excelsior District, before turning onto Ocean Avenue.

The line benefits from dedicated bus lanes along much of its length. Mission Street features these as far south as 30th Street, and the Van Ness Bus Rapid Transit project implemented center-running bus lanes along that street between Mission and Lombard Street.

== History ==
The line began service on August 24, 1983. It provided a replacement for the discontinued 12 Ocean bus.

The line was temporarily dieselized during construction of the Van Ness Bus Rapid Transit project and currently is due to the Potrero Yard Modernization Project.

== Ridership ==
With 25,000 daily boardings, the 49 Van Ness/Mission was Muni's busiest trolleybus service in 2019.
