= Junipero Serra and Ocean station =

Muni Metro light rail stop in San Francisco

Junipero Serra and Ocean
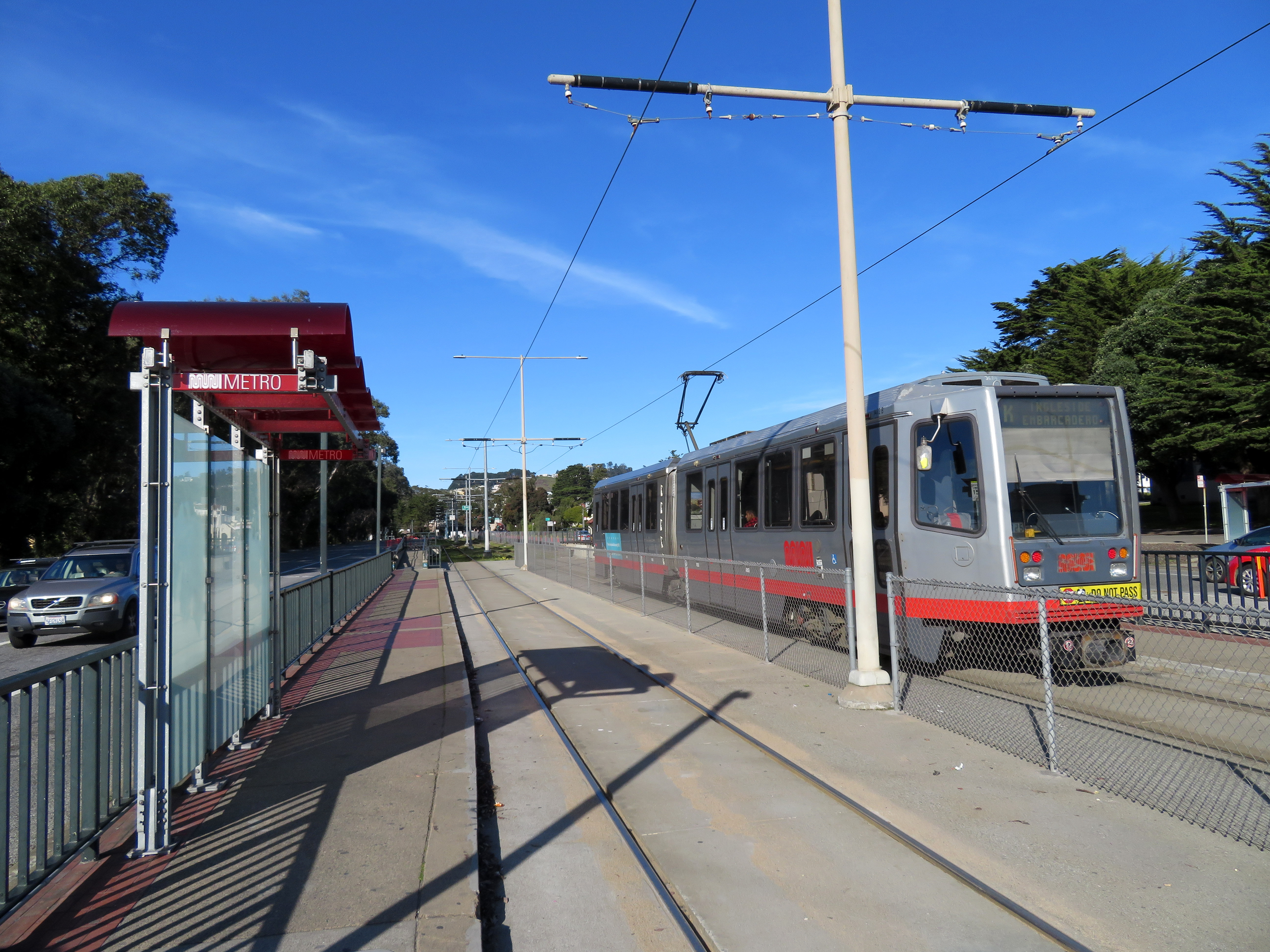
- An inbound train at Junipero Serra and Ocean in January 2018

General information
- Location: Junipero Serra Boulevard at Ocean Avenue; San Francisco, California
- Coordinates: 37°43′52″N 122°28′20″W
- Platforms: 2 side platforms
- Tracks: 2
- Connections: Muni: 57

Construction
- Accessible: Yes

History
- Opened: c. 1896

Services
Preceding station	Muni	Following station
St. Francis Circle toward Embarcadero	K Ingleside	Ocean and San Leandro toward Balboa Park
Location

Junipero Serra and Ocean is a light rail stop on the Muni Metro K Ingleside line, located in the St. Francis Wood neighborhood of San Francisco, California. It originally opened around 1896 on the United Railroads 12 line; K Ingleside service began in 1919.

== History ==
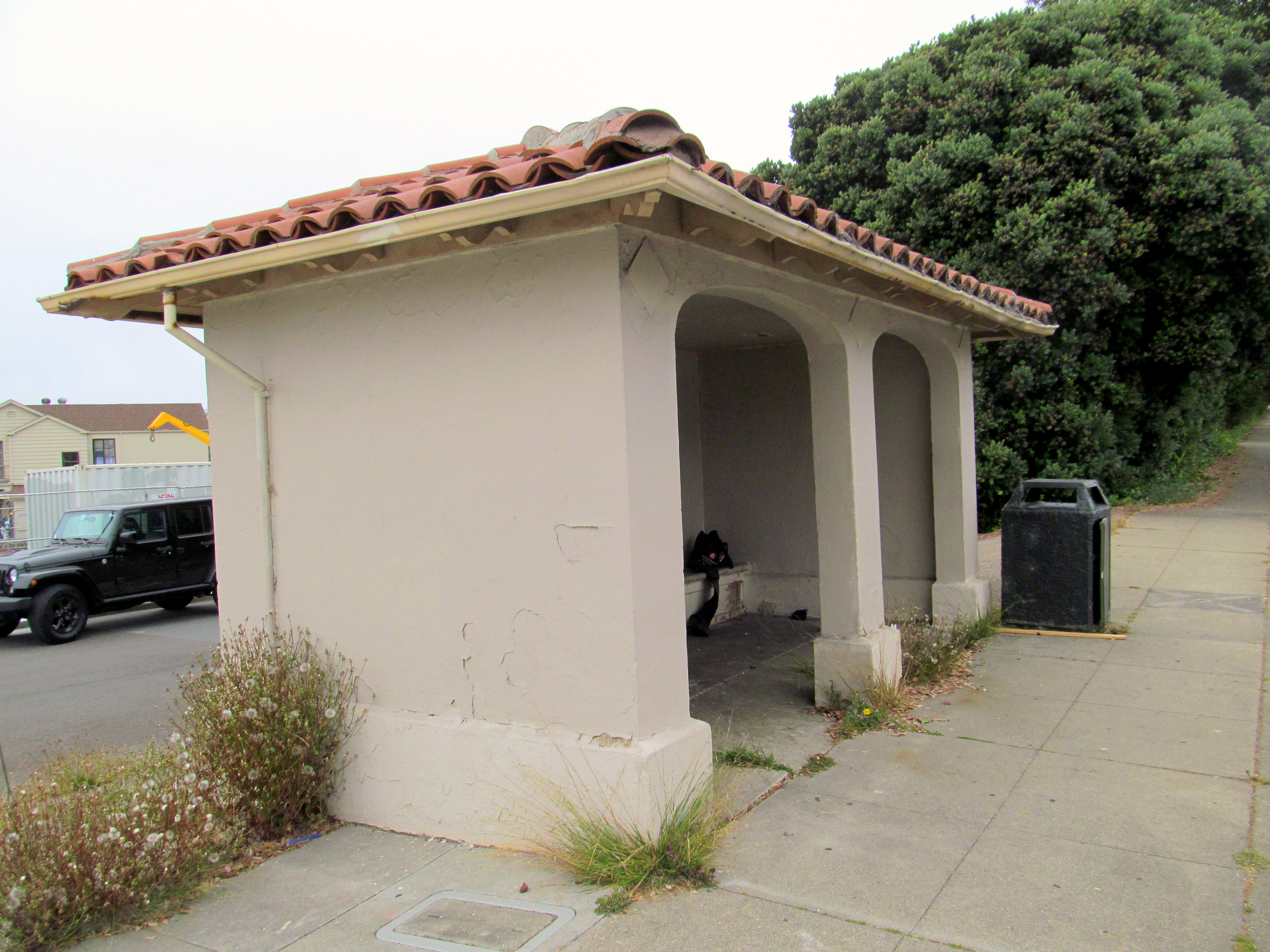
Muni-built southbound shelter, now used as a bus stop

The private Market Street Railway opened a branch – built in just six days – of its Mission Street line along Ocean Avenue to Victoria Street on December 4, 1895, to serve the new Ingleside Racetrack. The line was extended to the Ingleside House (where Ocean Avenue now meets Junipero Serra Boulevard) shortly thereafter. The 1906 earthquake damaged many cable car and streetcar lines; in the aftermath, the United Railroads (URR) – successor to the Market Street Railway – closed many cable cars lines and expanded the electric streetcar system. The URR resumed service on the Ocean Avenue line on May 6, 1906; the line (route 12) was soon extended to Ocean Beach via Junipero Serra Boulevard and Sloat Boulevard.

The city-owned Twin Peaks Tunnel was opened on February 3, 1918, with the K Ingleside line running through the tunnel and terminating at St. Francis Circle. On November 25, 1918, the city and the struggling URR signed the "Parkside Agreements", which allowed Muni streetcars to use URR trackage on Junipero Serra Boulevard, Ocean Avenue, and Taraval Street, in exchange for a cash payment and shared maintenance costs. The K Ingleside line was extended south on Junipero Serra Boulevard and east on Ocean to Ocean and Miramar on February 21, 1919. The city purchased the private company (renamed Market Street Railway in 1921) in 1944; route 12 service was removed from Junipero Serra Boulevard and Ocean Avenue on April 8, 1945, leaving just the K Ingleside.

The line was closed and replaced by buses from February 2001 to June 7, 2003, for the Ocean Avenue Reconstruction and Improvement Project, a major street repaving and utility replacement project.

== Bus service ==
The stop is also served by the route 57 bus, plus the K Bus, K Owl and 91 Owl bus routes, which provide service along the K Ingleside line during the early morning and late night hours respectively when trains do not operate.
