= 14 Mission =

San Francisco trolleybus route

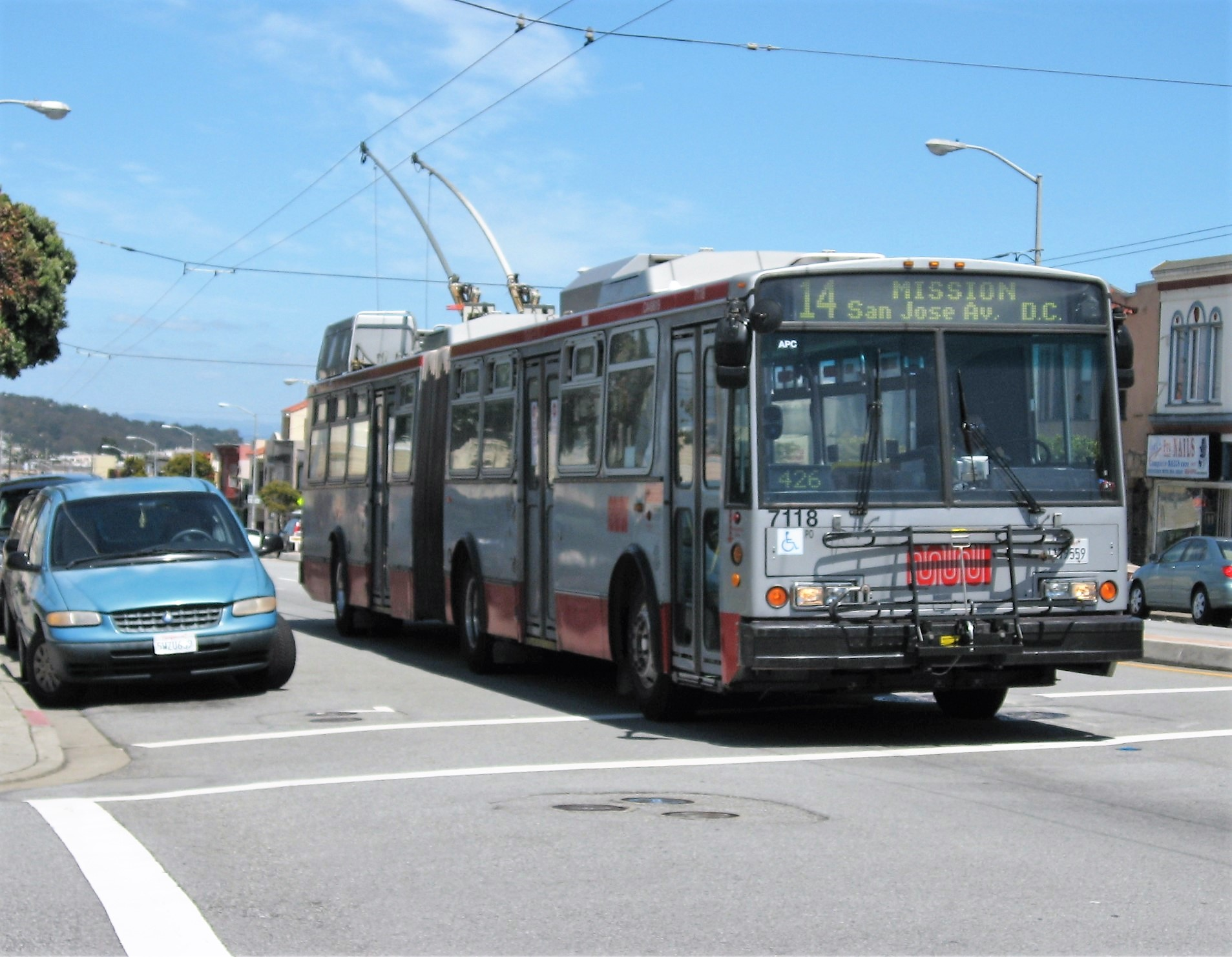
- A 14 bus on Mission Street heading towards Daly City in 2011

Overview
- System: Muni trolleybus network
- Operator: San Francisco Municipal Railway
- Garage: Flynn
- Vehicle: New Flyer XDE60
- Began service: September 15, 1894 (streetcar); 1952 (trolleybus)

Route
- Locale: San Francisco, California (short segment in Daly City)
- Start: Steuart and Mission (Ferry Plaza)
- Via: Mission Street
- End: Mission and San Jose (Daly City); Daly City BART station (14R)
- Length: 7.8 mi (12.6 km)
- Other routes: 14R, 14X, 49
- Daily ridership: 14: 22,100 (June 2026); 14R: 22,800 (June 2026)
- Map: 14 Mission / 14R Mission Rapid Map

14 Mission is a trolleybus line operated by the San Francisco Municipal Railway. It serves Mission Street between the Ferry Plaza and Daly City.

== Route description ==
The route runs almost entirely along Mission Street between the San Francisco Ferry Building Plaza and Mission and San Jose Streets in Daly City. Outbound buses run on Otis Street for the one-way segment of Mission near the Central Freeway. At 7.8 miles (12.6 km) in length, the 14 Mission is Muni's longest trolleybus line.

The route operates 24 hours as part of the All Nighter network.

=== 14R Mission Rapid ===
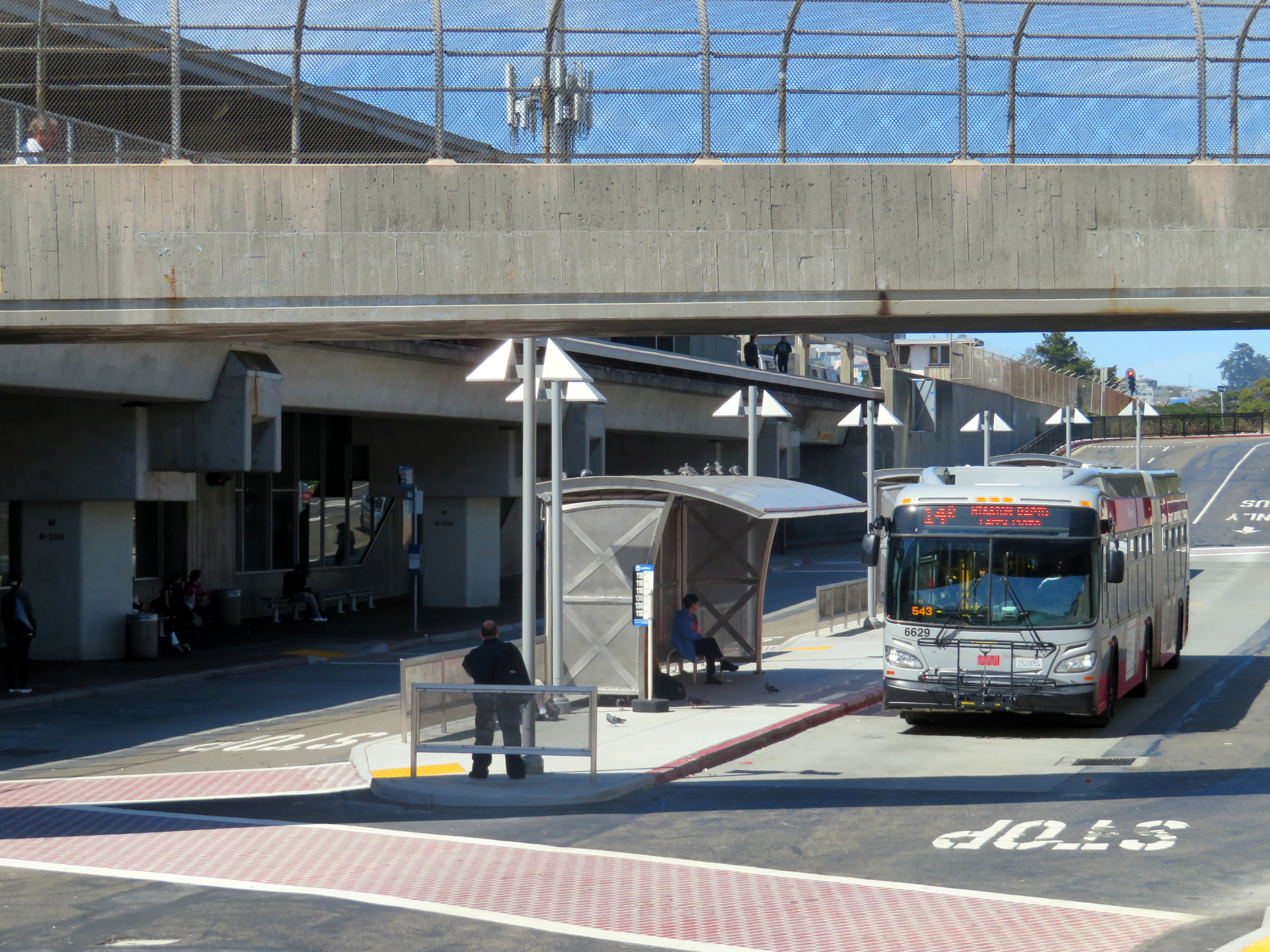
Muni route 14R-Mission Rapid bus at Daly City station in June 2018

Limited-stop service is provided by the 14R Mission Rapid between 5th Street and Sickles Avenue/Acton Street in order to provide faster service through the corridor. The southern terminus is Daly City BART station. This service utilizes regular buses in order to allow passing of local services and due to lack of overhead line at the southern terminus.

=== 14X Mission Express ===
The 14X Mission Express was a modified rush-hour route that was primarily operated on Mission Street, but ran express between Trumbull and 6th Streets, partially utilizing Interstate 280 and U.S. Route 101. This service utilized regular buses due to lack of overhead line on the non-Mission segments.

The 14X was suspended as part of the city's COVID-19 response in April 2020, and remains temporarily out of service as of 2025.

== History ==
Taking over from a previous horsecar operation, the Market Street Railway electrified streetcar line along Mission Boulevard opened on September 15, 1894. Following the 1906 San Francisco earthquake, service resumed on May 6. The service acquired the number 14 in 1908. The southern end of the line was largely rebuilt between 1935 and 1936. Also by the 1930s, cars would continue further south at certain times. Rush hour service ran as far south as South San Francisco. Holy Cross Cemetery in Colma served as a southern terminus on certain holidays, and cars ran to Tanforan Racetrack in San Bruno during the racing season. All Sunday cars continued to Holy Cross starting in April 1948. Streetcar service ended on January 15, 1949, with buses operating the route until 1952 when the line was fully converted to trolleybus operation.

Bay Area Rapid Transit construction on Mission Street greatly disrupted 14 Mission operations throughout the late 1960s. San Francisco Municipal Transportation Agency installed bus lanes along Mission Street in 2016 to speed travel times for the 14 bus.
