= Ingleside Terraces, San Francisco =

Ingleside Terrace
- Ingleside Terraces
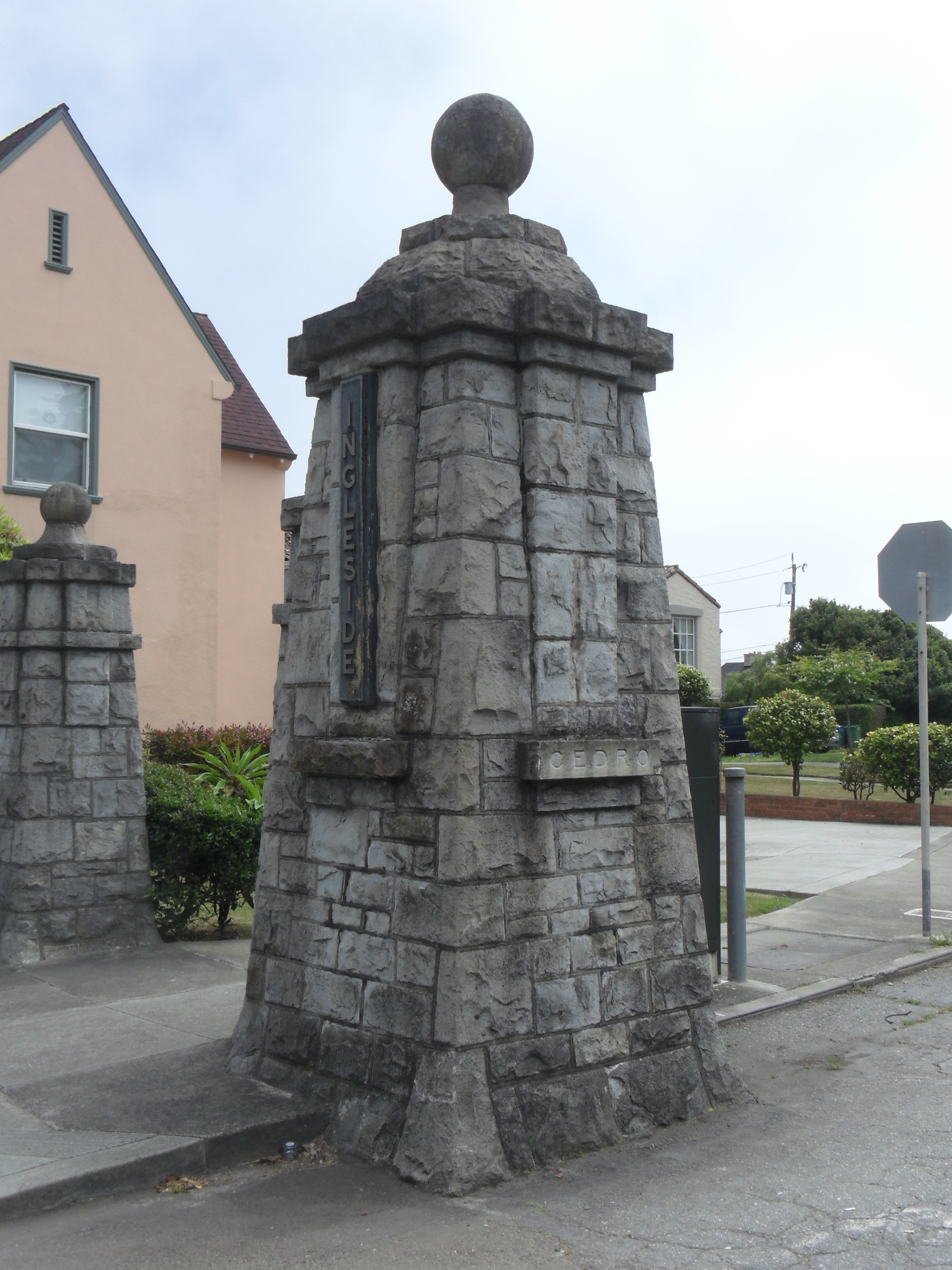
- Interactive map of Ingleside Terrace
- Coordinates: 37°43′30″N 122°28′7″W
- Founder: Joseph A. Leonard

Ingleside Terraces is an affluent residential neighborhood of approximately 750 detached homes built at the former location of the Ingleside Racetrack on the West Side of San Francisco. It is adjacent to the Balboa Terrace, Ingleside, Merced Heights, and Lakeside neighborhoods, and is bordered by Ocean Avenue to the north, Ashton Avenue to the east, Holloway Avenue to the south and Junipero Serra Boulevard to the west. The main local event that occurs is the Annual Sundial Park Picnic, in which the local residents host bicycle, chariot, and wagon racing. There is a large sundial located on Entrada Court, surrounded by the oval-shaped Urbano Drive, which was once a horse race track. Ingleside Terraces is one of nine master-planned residence parks in San Francisco.

== Ingleside Racetrack ==
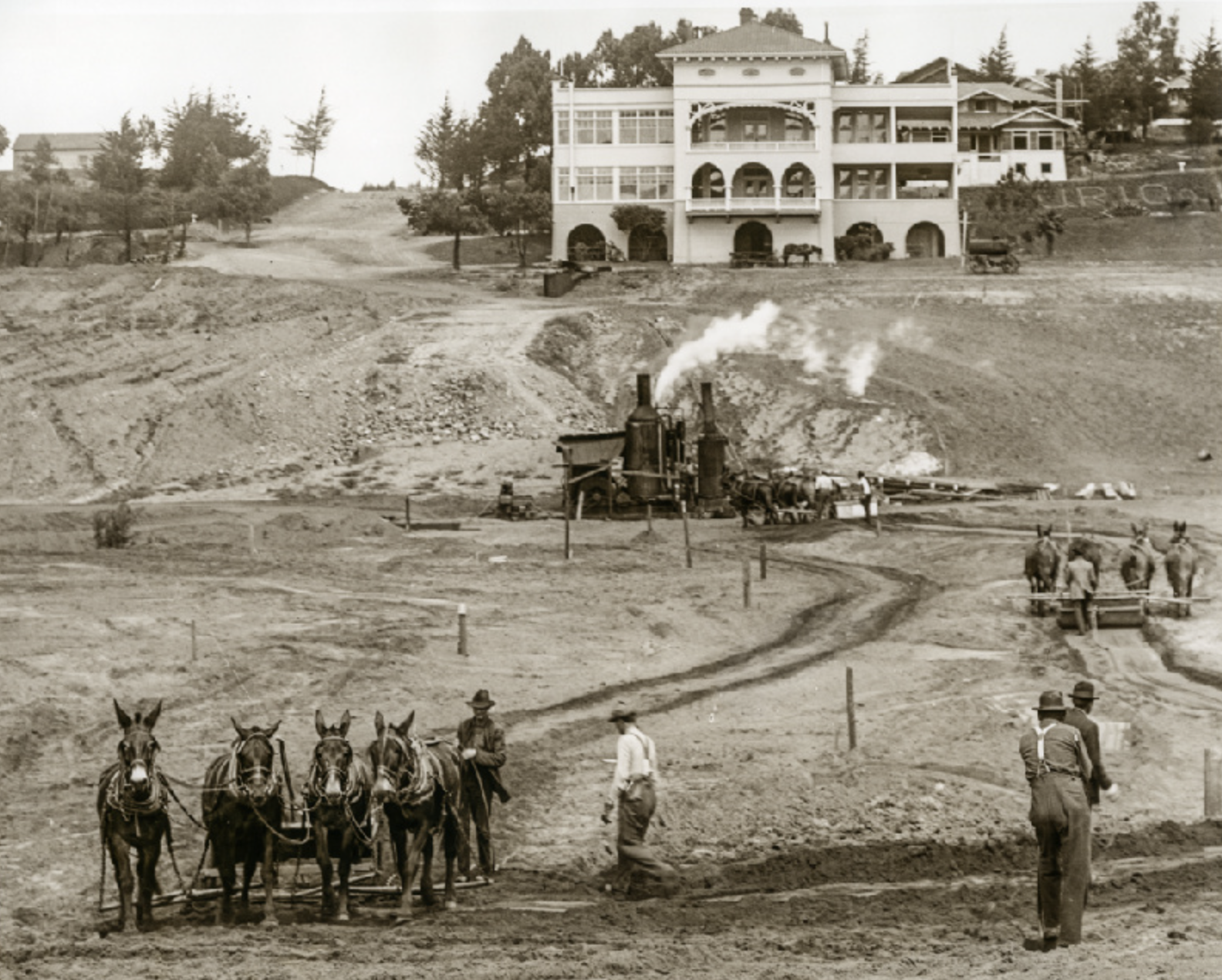
Grading for Ingleside Terraces (c. 1912); Ingleside Racetrack clubhouse in background

The land used to be part of San Miguel Rancho; and it was one of the last parts of San Francisco to be incorporated. Ingleside Racetrack was opened on November 28, 1895, the result of a dispute between Edward C. Corrigan and Thomas Williams at Williams’ Bay View Racetrack. The reason for the disagreement is unclear, but Corrigan supposedly vowed to build his own racetrack, bigger, grander, and of higher quality than Williams'. Eight thousand people came on opening day. Ingleside Racetrack had raised the elegance standard considerably; there were bands, fine dining, wonderful views, a clubhouse; fitting in with the other gambling operations in the area.

The first automobile race in California was held at the track in 1900. Out of the eight vehicles, only the winner reached the finish line; all of the other contestants had either crashed or had engine problems.

By 1905, Williams had taken over the racing business in the Bay Area, soon adding Ingleside Racetrack to his collection. However, before the track could be reopened, the 1906 earthquake and fires hit. Williams offered the track to the city, free of charge, to serve as a more permanent refugee camp for many homeless San Franciscans. Windows were added to the horse stables, which were cleaned and painted. It also hosted the patients from today's Laguna Honda Hospital as the facility recovered from the earthquake. The track was never re-opened.

== Development ==
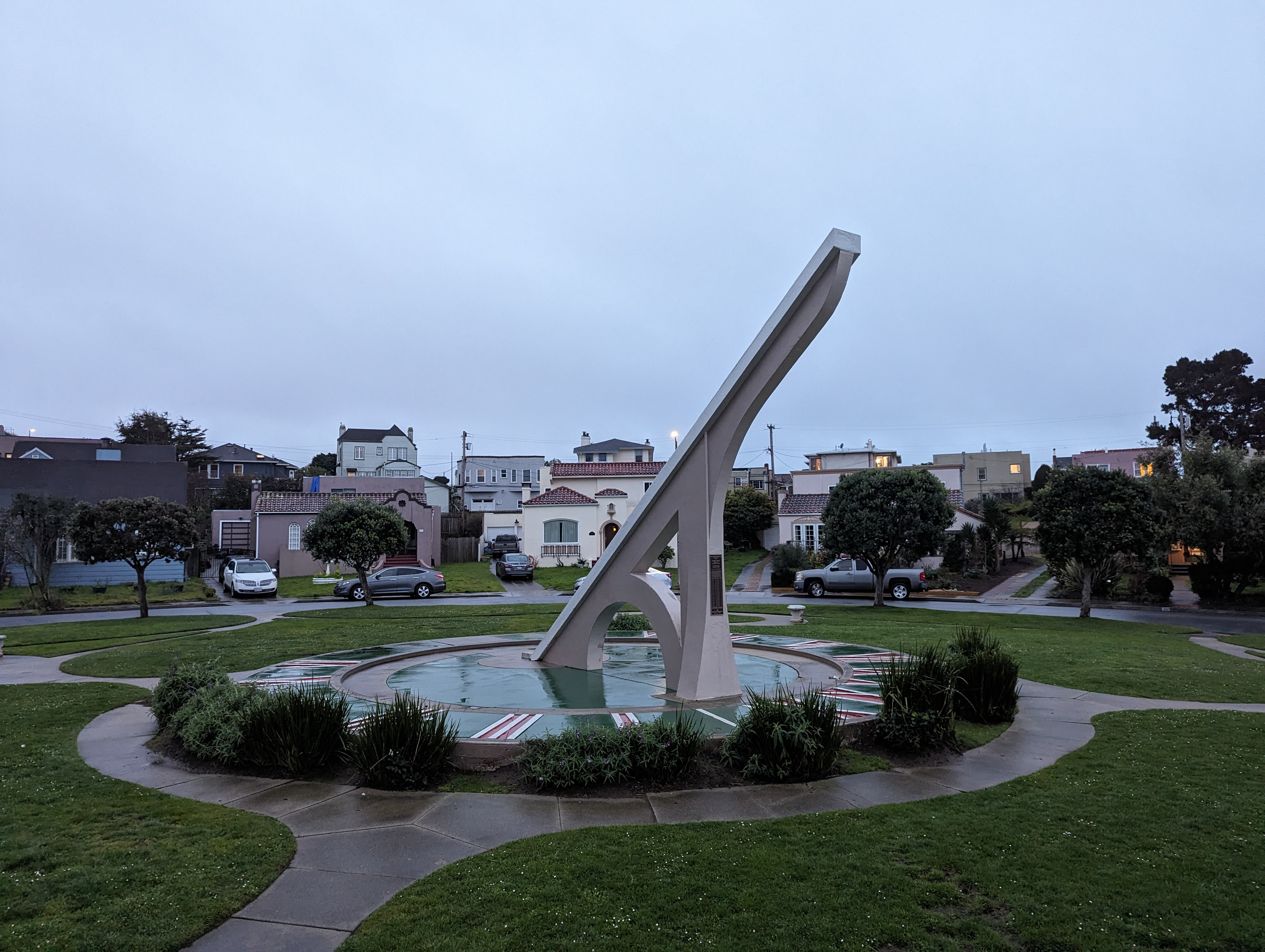
Upon its completion in 1913, the Ingleside Terraces sundial was the largest sundial in the United States.

In 1910, Joseph A. Leonard's Urban Realty Improvement Company bought the track and set about turning the land into a residence park. By 1912, Ingleside Terraces had opened, with Urbano Drive paved on the loop of the old racetrack.

Like other suburban developments built in the United States at the time, Ingleside Terraces was explicitly designed to be a segregated whites-only neighborhood, and written into the property deed was a section reading: "That no person of African, Japanese, Chinese, or of any Mongolian descent shall be allowed to purchase, own, lease, or occupy said real property or any part thereof." The 1948 Supreme Court case Shelley v. Kraemer declared racial restrictions were illegal and unenforceable in courts, though the restrictions continued to be enforced socially. In 1957, assistant district attorney Cecil F. Poole moved into the neighborhood with his family as the first non-white residents. The following year, on June 5, 1958, other neighborhood residents burned a cross on the front lawn of the Pooles' house.

== Designated Landmarks ==
There are three San Francisco Designated Landmarks within the neighborghood:

- The 1922 Ingleside Presbyterian Church, completed by Joseph A. Leonard.
- The El Rey Theatre, designed by Timothy L. Pflueger opened on Ocean Avenue in 1931.
- The Cecil F. Poole House.
