= Irving and 8th Avenue / 9th Avenue and Irving stations =

Muni Metro light rail stops in San Francisco

Irving and 8th Avenue 9th Avenue and Irving
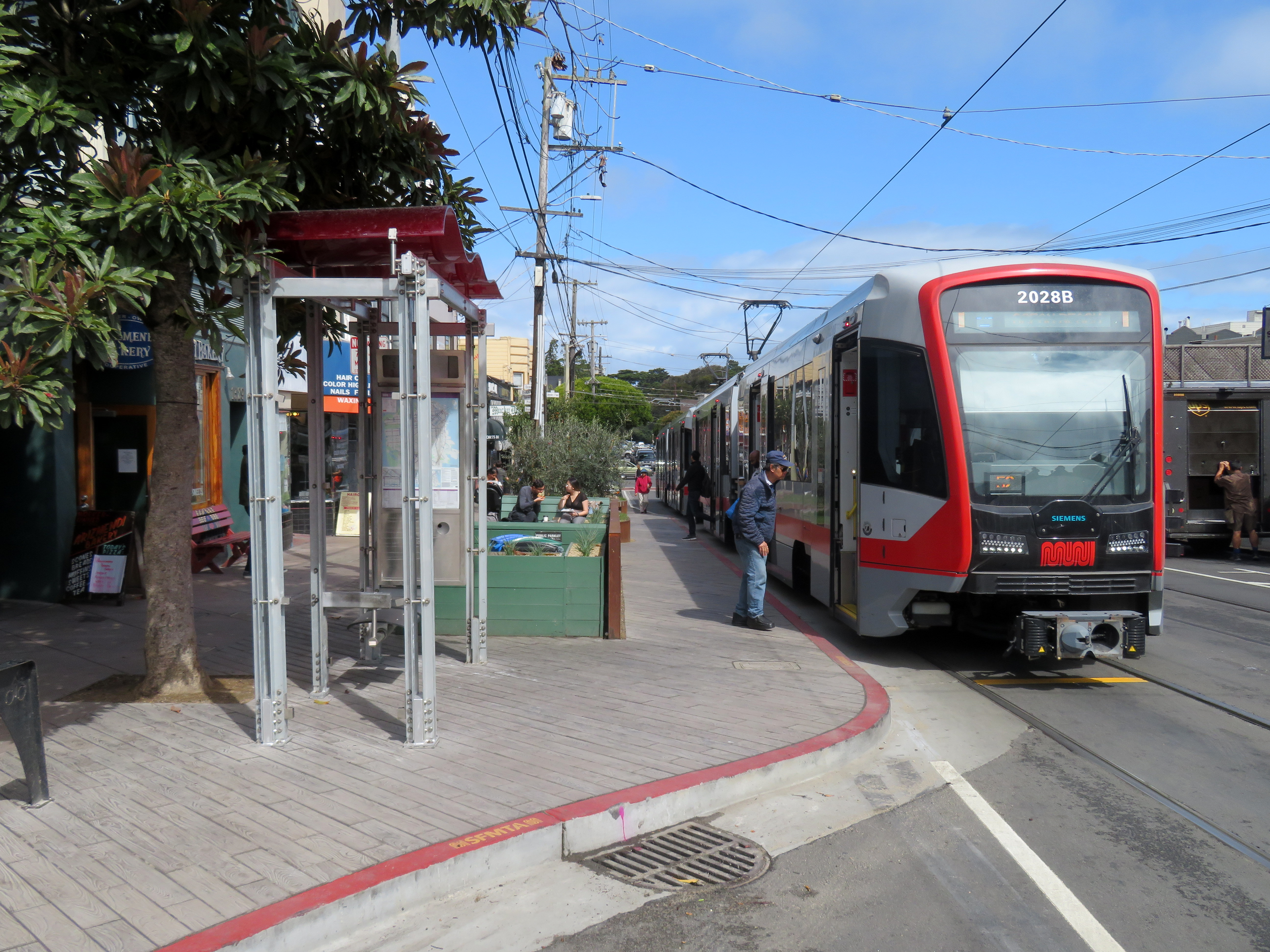
- A westbound train at 9th Avenue and Irving in September 2019

General information
- Location: Irving Street at 8th Avenue (eastbound); 9th Avenue at Irving Street (westbound); San Francisco, California
- Coordinates: 37°45′51″N 122°27′59″W
- Platforms: 2 side platforms
- Tracks: 2
- Connections: Muni: 44

Construction
- Accessible: No

History
- Opened: October 21, 1928
- Rebuilt: September 2017–September 14, 2019

Passengers
- 2014: 3,700 (daily average)

Services
Preceding station	Muni	Following station
Judah and 9th Avenue toward Ocean Beach	N Judah	Irving and 5th/6th Avenues toward 4th and King
Location

Irving and 8th Avenue / 9th Avenue and Irving stations are a pair of one-way light rail stops on the Muni Metro N Judah line, located in the Sunset District neighborhood of San Francisco, California. The eastbound stop is located on Irving Street at 8th Avenue, while westbound trains stop on 9th Avenue at Irving Street. The station has transit bulbs which extend the sidewalk of Irving Street and 9th Avenue to meet trains like a side platform, allowing passengers to board or depart from trains. The station is not accessible to people with disabilities.

Golden Gate Park is accessible from Irving and 9th Avenue, with the De Young Museum and California Academy of Sciences both located around half a mile from the station.

The station pair is also served by bus route 44, plus the N Bus and N Owl bus routes, which provide service along the N Judah line during the early morning and late night hours respectively when trains do not operate.

== Stop changes ==
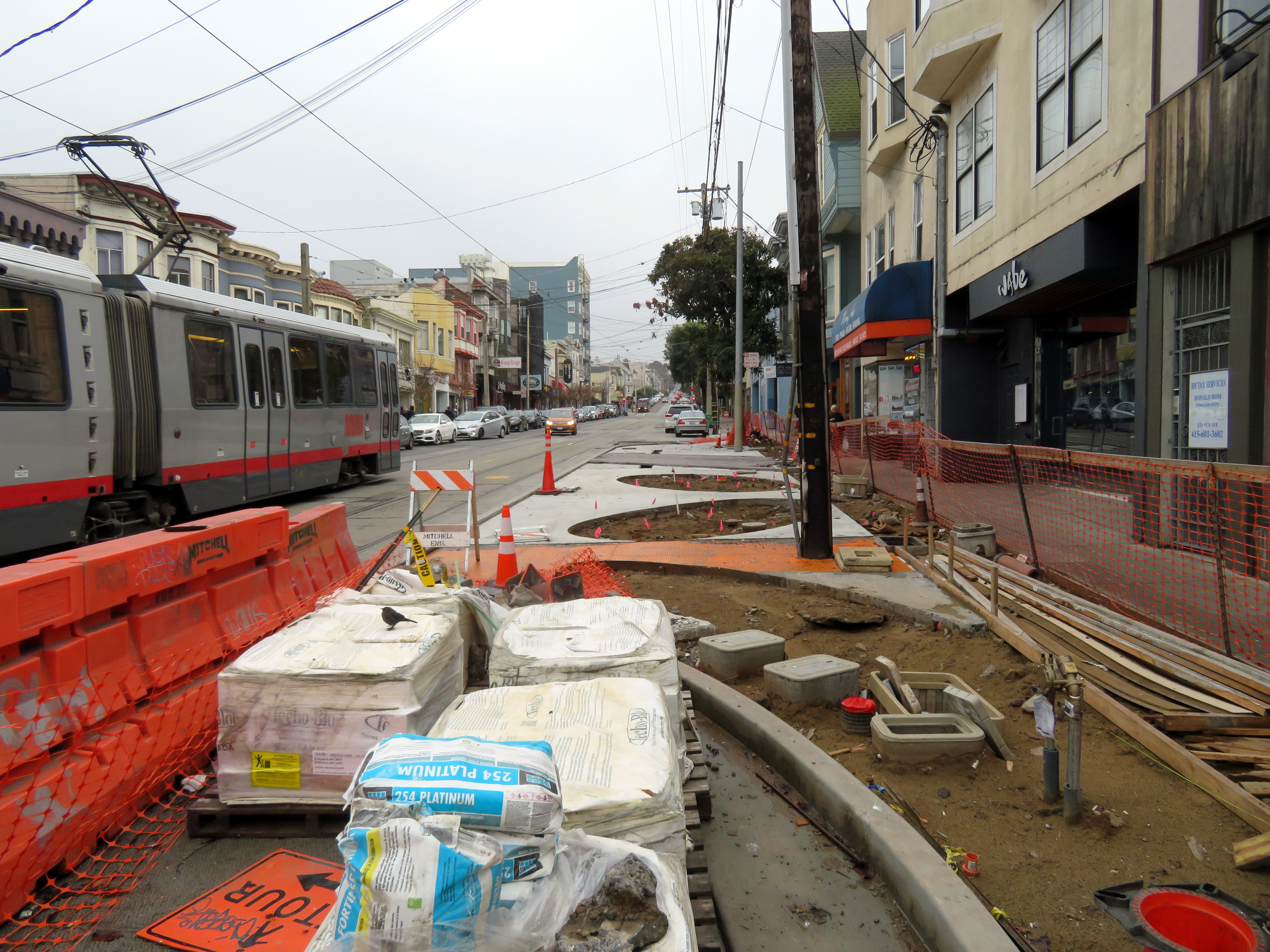
Construction of the westbound bulbout in January 2019

Until 2019, eastbound trains stopped on 9th Avenue at Irving, and westbound trains on Irving at 9th Avenue. This required many trains to wait for the traffic signal to change after making their station stop, and prevented the deployment of transit signal priority at the intersection.

In March 2014, Muni released details of the proposed implementation of their Transit Effectiveness Project (later rebranded MuniForward), which included a variety of stop changes for the N Judah line. The stop locations at Irving and 9th Avenue were to be moved to the far side of the intersection (to allow trains to pass through before stopping) and transit bulbs constructed to allow passengers to board directly from the sidewalk. The eastbound bulb would be adjacent to 8th Avenue, and the westbound bulb north of the existing bus stop, to allow trains to fully clear the intersection before opening their doors.

Two subprojects – accessible platforms at 28th Avenue, and improvements on Irving Street between 9th Avenue and Arguello – were selected for early implementation in coordination with rail replacement and seismic refitting of the Sunset Tunnel. The latter project (the Inner Sunset Streetscape Project) began construction during weekend shutdowns of the line in September 2017. It included construction of the bulbouts proposed in 2014. The new platforms opened on September 14, 2019.
