= Irving and 5th Avenue / Irving and 6th Avenue stations =

Muni Metro light rail stops in San Francisco

Irving and 5th Avenue Irving and 6th Avenue
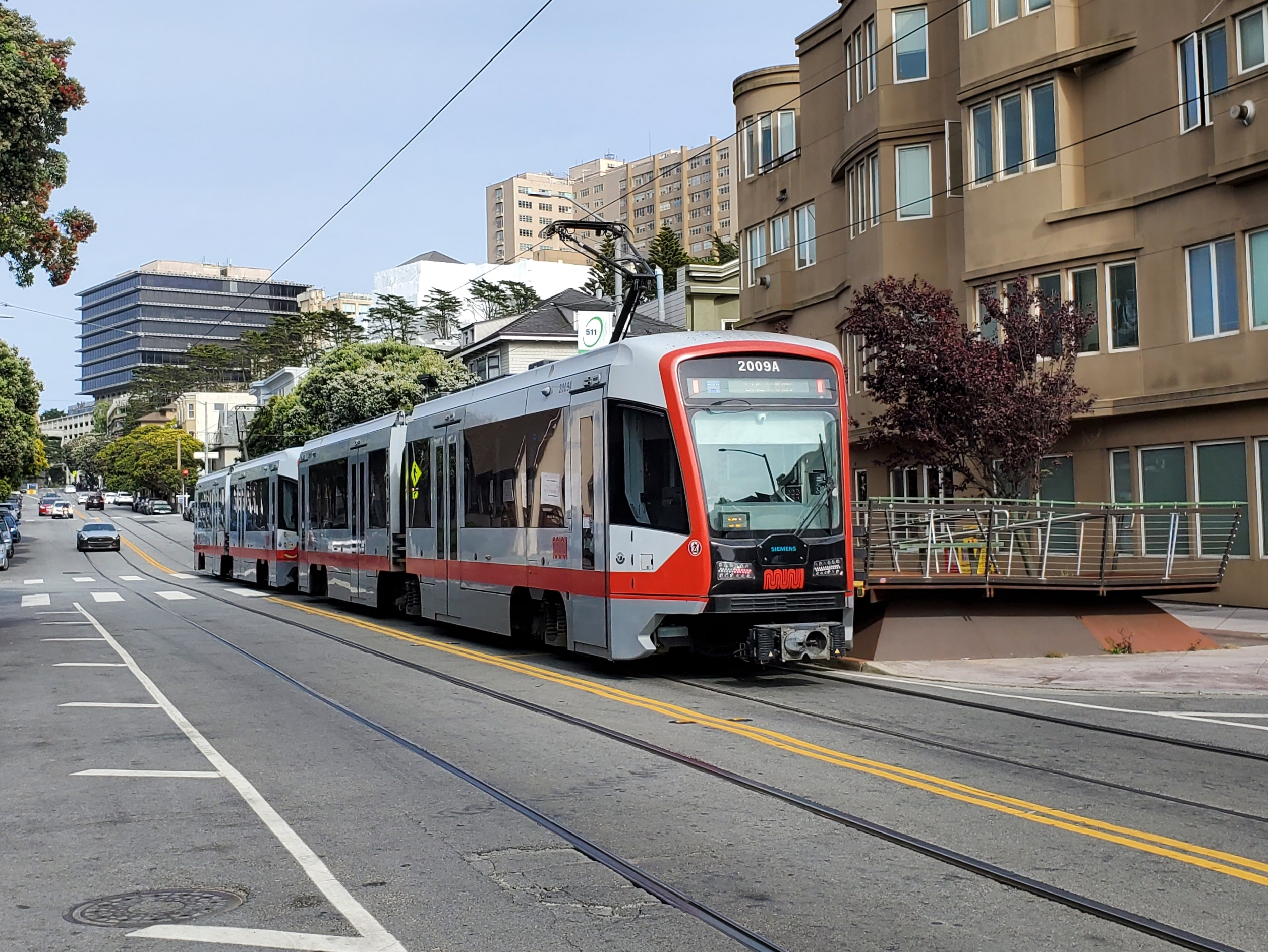
- A eastbound train at 5th Avenue in May 2022

General information
- Location: Irving Street at 5th and 6th Avenues; San Francisco, California
- Coordinates: 37°45′51″N 122°27′45″W
- Platforms: 2 side platforms
- Tracks: 2

Construction
- Cycle facilities: Racks
- Accessible: Yes

History
- Opened: August 22, 2020

Services
Preceding station	Muni	Following station
Irving and 8th Avenue / 9th Avenue and Irving toward Ocean Beach	N Judah	UCSF Parnassus toward 4th and King
Location

Irving and 5th Avenue / Irving and 6th Avenue stations are a pair of light rail stops on the Muni Metro N Judah line, located in the Sunset District neighborhood of San Francisco, California. The eastbound stop is located on Irving Street at 5th Avenue, while westbound trains stop on Irving Street at 6th Avenue.

The station has transit bulbs which extend the sidewalk of Irving Street to meet trains like a side platform, allowing passengers to board or depart from trains. The bulbs also have mini-high platforms which provide access to both lines for people with disabilities.

The stop is also served by the N Bus and N Owl bus routes, which provide service along the N Judah line during the early morning and late night hours respectively when trains do not operate.

== History ==
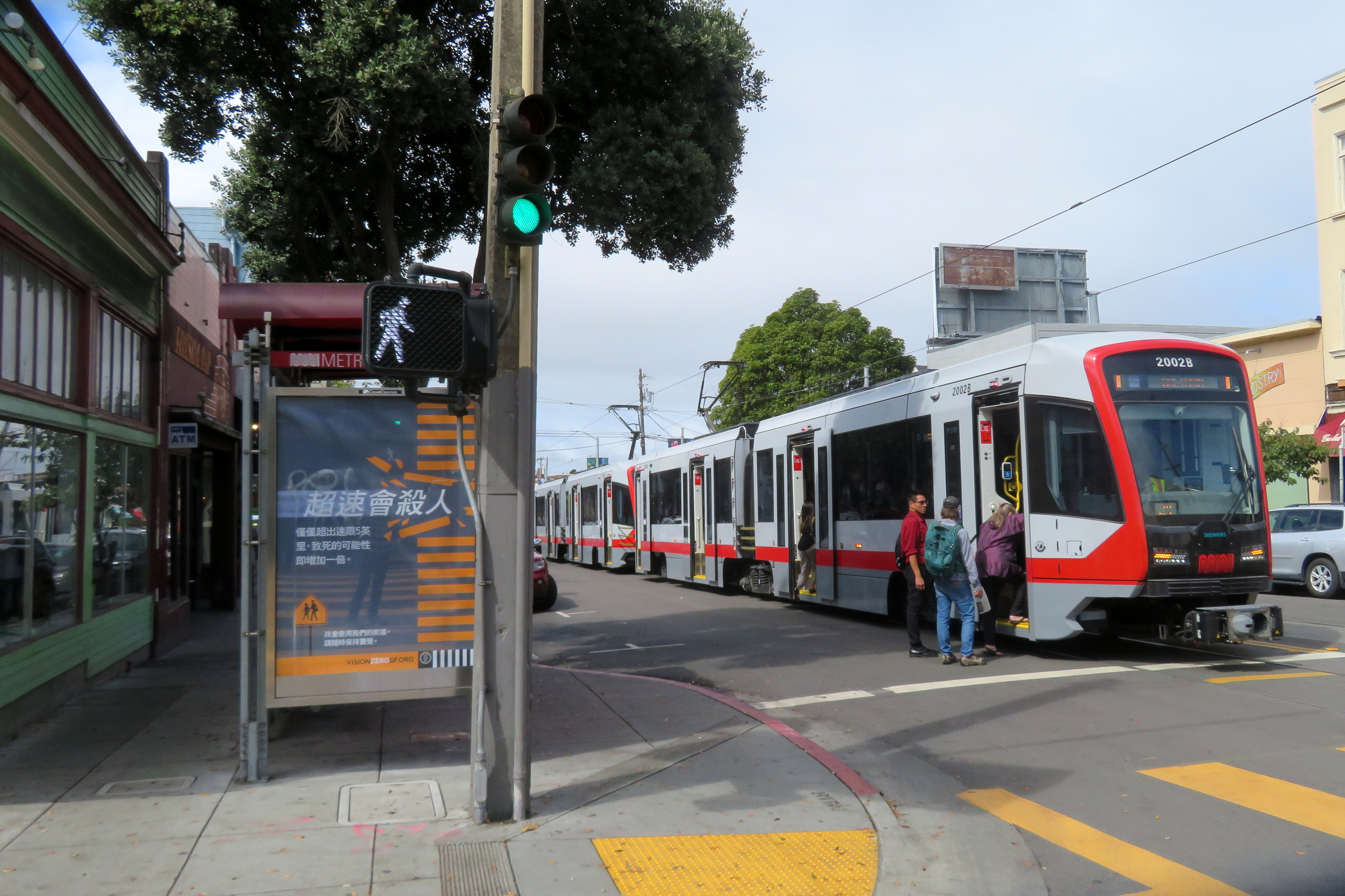
An inbound train at the former 7th Avenue stop in 2019

The N Judah line opened on October 21, 1928. By the 2010s, trains stopped on Irving at several cross streets including 4th Avenue and 7th Avenue. Passengers had to cross travel lanes to board, and neither stop was accessible.

In March 2014, Muni released details of the proposed implementation of their Transit Effectiveness Project (later rebranded MuniForward), which included a variety of stop changes for the N Judah line. Two stops on Irving Street at 4th Avenue and 7th Avenue would be consolidated into a single stop between 5th and 6th Avenues, with transit bulbs constructed to allow passengers to board directly from the sidewalk. The eastbound bulb would be adjacent to 5th Avenue, with the westbound bulb adjacent to 6th Avenue. Both bulbs include accessible mini-high platforms.

Two subprojects – accessible platforms at 28th Avenue, and improvements on Irving Street between 9th Avenue and Arguello – were selected for early implementation in coordination with rail replacement and seismic refitting of the Sunset Tunnel. The latter project (the Inner Sunset Streetscape Project) began construction during weekend shutdowns of the line in September 2017.

All Muni Metro service was replaced by buses on March 30, 2020, due to the COVID-19 pandemic. When rail service resumed on August 22, 2020, the 5th Avenue and 6th Avenue stops replaced the former 4th Avenue and 7th Avenue stops. The station was in service for three days before Muni Metro service was again indefinitely replaced by buses on August 25, 2020, due to malfunctioning overhead wire splices and the need to quarantine control center staff after a COVID-19 case. N Judah service resumed on May 15, 2021.
