= Judah and 9th Avenue station =

Muni Metro light rail stop in San Francisco

Judah and 9th Avenue
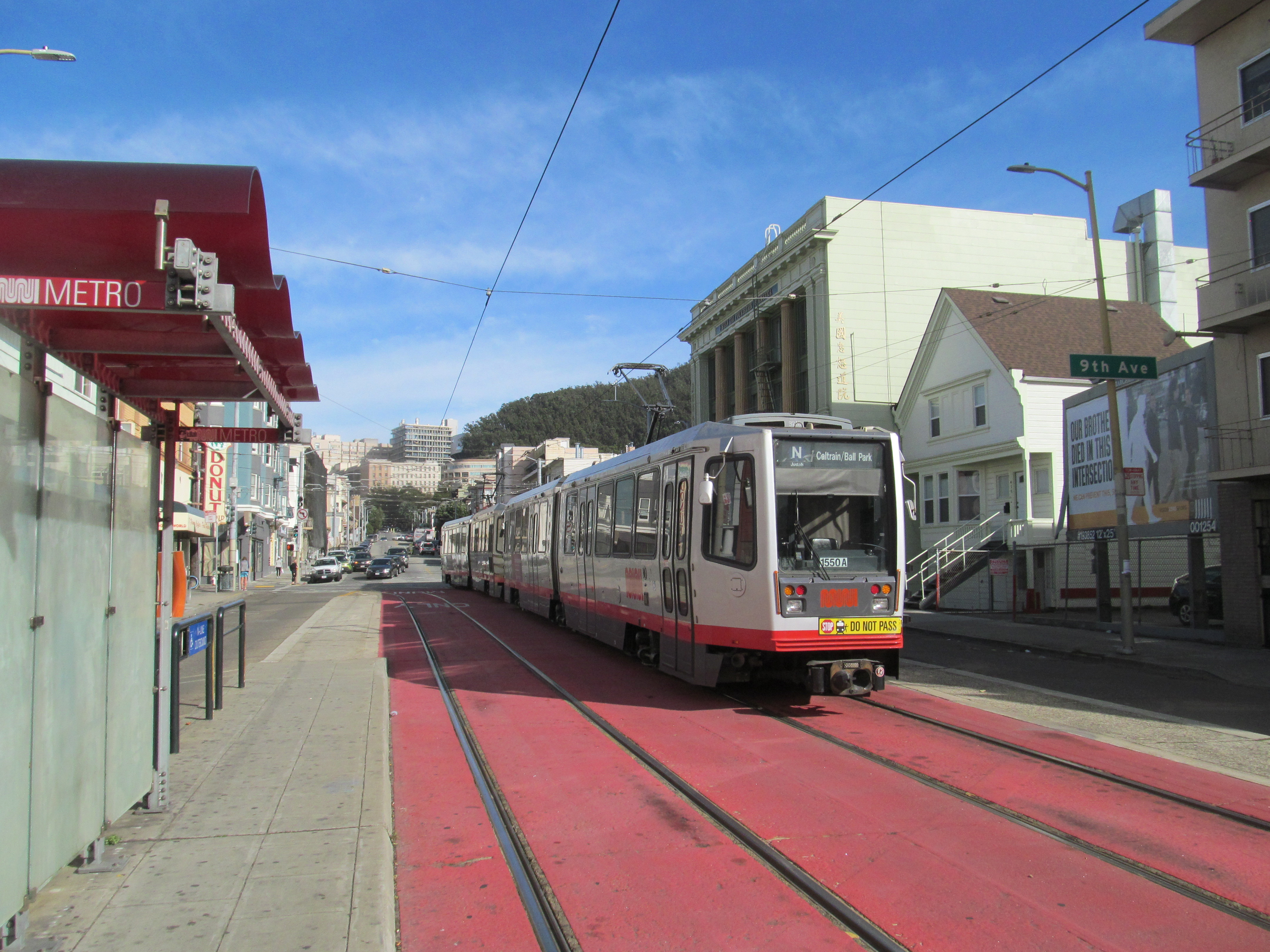
- An eastbound train at Judah and 9th Avenue in 2017

General information
- Location: Judah Street at 9th Avenue; San Francisco, California
- Coordinates: 37°45′44″N 122°27′58″W
- Platforms: 2 side platforms
- Tracks: 2
- Connections: Muni: 6, 43, 44, 66

Construction
- Accessible: Yes

History
- Opened: October 21, 1928
- Rebuilt: 1978

Services
Preceding station	Muni	Following station
Judah and 12th Avenue toward Ocean Beach	N Judah	Irving and 8th Avenue / 9th Avenue and Irving toward 4th and King
Location

Judah and 9th Avenue is a light rail stop on the Muni Metro N Judah line, located in the Sunset District neighborhood of San Francisco, California. The station opened with the N Judah line on October 21, 1928. The station has two side platforms in the middle of Judah Street (traffic islands) where passengers board or depart from trains. The station also has mini-high platforms providing access to people with disabilities.

The stop is also served by bus routes 6, 43, 44 and 66, plus the N Bus and N Owl bus routes, which provide service along the N Judah line during the early morning and late night hours respectively when trains do not operate.

In March 2014, Muni released details of the proposed implementation of their Transit Effectiveness Project (later rebranded MuniForward), which included a variety of stop changes for the N Judah line. Under that plan – which will be implemented as the N Judah Rapid Project – Judah and 9th Avenue will be one of the only stops on the line without significant changes, as its boarding islands are already long enough to accommodate a full train.
