= Judah and 22nd Avenue / Judah and 23rd Avenue stations =

Muni Metro light rail stops in San Francisco

Judah and 22nd Avenue Judah and 23rd Avenue
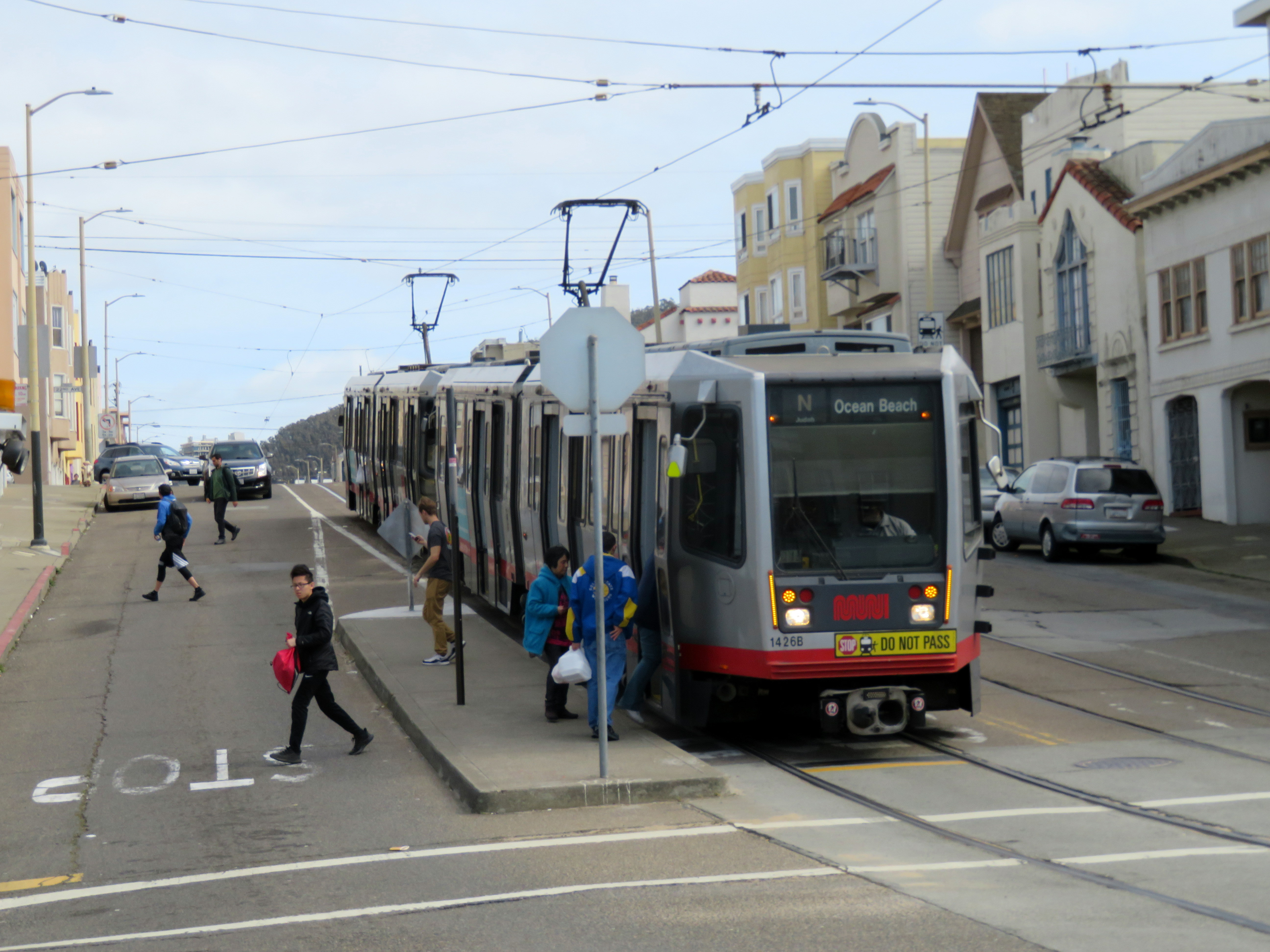
- A westbound train at Judah and 23rd Avenue in February 2018

General information
- Location: Judah Street at 22nd and 23rd Avenues; San Francisco, California
- Coordinates: 37°45′41″N 122°28′53″W
- Platforms: 2 side platforms
- Tracks: 2
- Connections: Muni: 7, 7X, N^{x}

Construction
- Accessible: No

History
- Opened: October 21, 1928

Services
Preceding station	Muni	Following station
Judah and 25th Avenue toward Ocean Beach	N Judah	Judah and 19th Avenue toward 4th and King
Location

Judah and 22nd Avenue / Judah and 23rd Avenue stations are a pair of light rail stops on the Muni Metro N Judah line, located in the Sunset District neighborhood of San Francisco, California. The eastbound stop is located on Judah Street at 22nd Avenue, while westbound trains stop on Judah Street at 23rd Avenue. The stops opened with the N Judah line on October 21, 1928. The station has two short side platforms in the middle of Judah Street (traffic islands) where passengers board or depart from trains. The station is not accessible to people with disabilities.

== History ==
In March 2014, Muni released details of the proposed implementation of their Transit Effectiveness Project (later rebranded MuniForward), which included a variety of stop changes for the N Judah line. Under that plan – which will be implemented as the N Judah Rapid Project – the stops will have their short boarding islands extended to accommodate longer trains.

== Bus service ==
The stop is also served by routes 7, 7X (a weekday peak hours express service) and the N^{x} bus, a weekday peak hours route that provides express service from the east end of the N Judah line to the Financial District, plus the N Bus and N Owl bus routes, which provide service along the N Judah line during the early morning and late night hours respectively when trains do not operate.
