= Buena Vista Park =

Park in San Francisco, California, United States

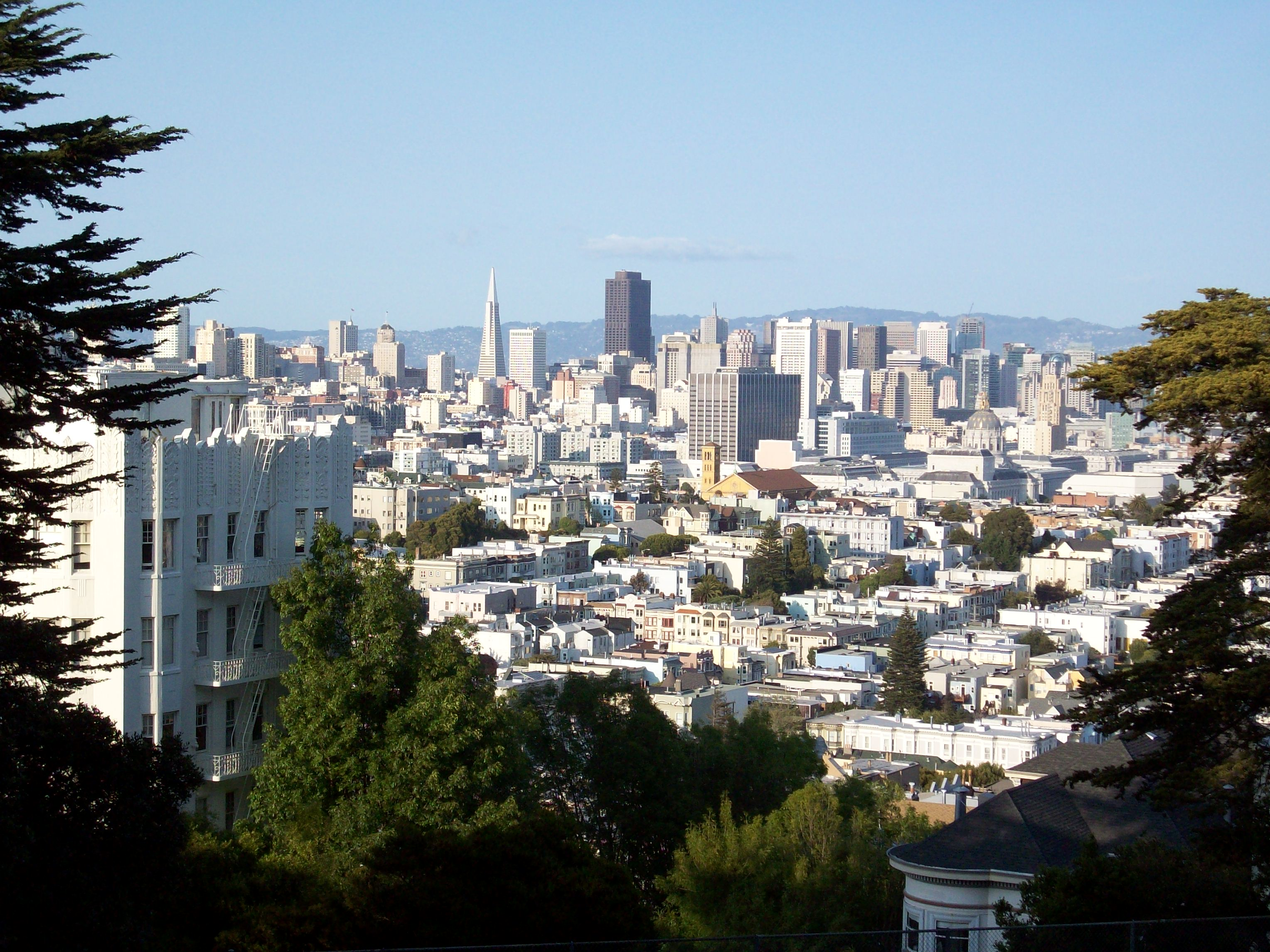
- The view from Buena Vista Park
- Interactive map of Buena Vista Park
- Type: Municipal (San Francisco)
- Location: San Francisco, California, United States
- Coordinates: 37°46′06″N 122°26′27″W
- Area: 38.3 acres (15.5 ha; 0.0598 mi^{2}; 0.155 km^{2})
- Created: 1867
- Owner: San Francisco Recreation & Parks Department
- Operator: San Francisco Recreation & Parks Department
- Open: All year, 6 a.m. to 10 p.m.
- Parking: Street parking
- Website: Official website

Buena Vista Park is a public park in the Haight-Ashbury and Buena Vista Heights neighborhoods of San Francisco, California. It is the oldest official park in San Francisco, established in 1867 as Hill Park, later renamed Buena Vista. It is bounded by Haight Street to the north, and by Buena Vista Avenue West and Buena Vista Avenue East. The park is on a steep hill that peaks at 575 feet (175 m), and covers 38.3-acre (15.5 ha). The lowest section is the north end along Haight.

== Layout ==
The hill on which the park lies is composed primarily of sand and San Francisco chert, formed in the Mesozoic era. The layout of the park uses the steepness of the hill to good advantage, offering good views of the city (particularly to the north).

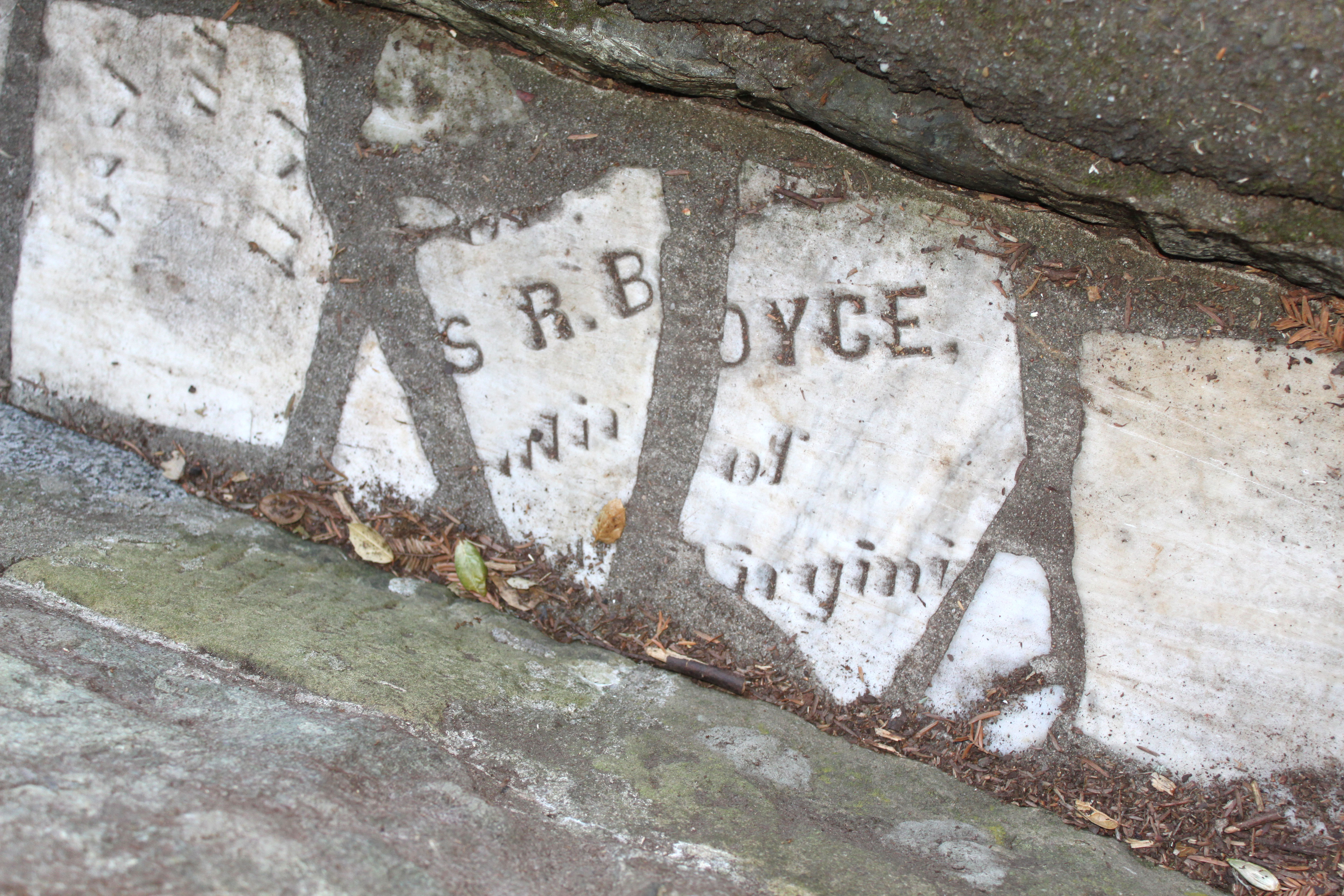
A broken headstone re-purposed for a rain gutter, located several path tiers up the hill, overlooking Haight Street

At the peak of the park is a small lawn. Notable views are available from various lookouts lower down, including "The Window," an overlook on the western side of the hill from which there is a sweeping vista of Golden Gate Park, the Pacific Ocean, and, on clear days, northward up the coast to the white cliffs of Drake's Bay.

The paths along the west side are lined with gutters built by WPA workers out of broken headstones from the city's Victorian cemeteries at Lone Mountain Cemetery, which were moved to Colma in the 1930s. In a few cases the inscriptions were placed facing up and can be discerned (Cf. the Wave Organ).

The northeast corner staircase features a large peace symbol (the classic Campaign for Nuclear Disarmament variety) shaped out of flower plantings. Further south a tennis court is located just inside the park at the intersection of Duboce and Buena Vista East streets.

== Other points of interest ==
Across the street from the south side of the park is 355 Buena Vista East, an architecturally notable building which appears briefly in Alfred Hitchcock's Vertigo. The building, constructed in 1928 as St. Joseph's Hospital, has been converted to condominiums. The building is on the National Register of Historic Places.

611 Buena Vista West, on the west side of the park near Frederick Street, was a particularly noteworthy example of the modern-architecture work of Cass Calder Smith, as featured in many architectural magazines including Dwell (Jan/Feb 2005). This modern house was significantly modified with an addition of another level in 2015.

The N Judah runs underneath the park via the Sunset Tunnel.

== See also ==
- List of hills in San Francisco
