= Route 44 (disambiguation) =

Route 44 may refer to:

- Route 44 (MTA Maryland), a bus route in Baltimore, Maryland and its suburbs
- London Buses route 44
- SEPTA Route 44, Philadelphia
- 44 O'Shaughnessy, a bus route in San Francisco

== See also ==
- List of highways numbered 44
