= N Judah =

Light rail line in San Francisco, California

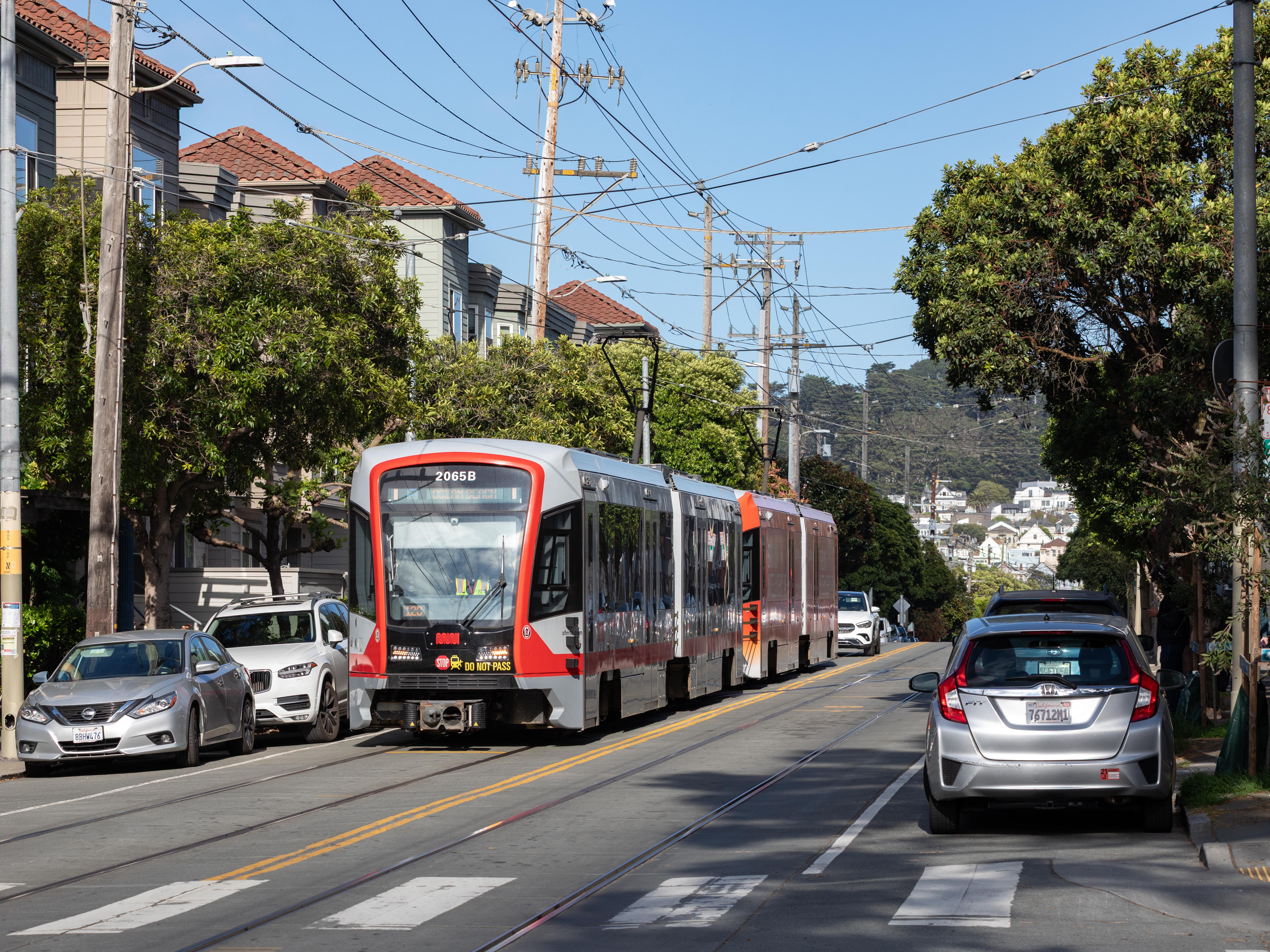
- N Judah train on Carl Street in April 2026

Overview
- Owner: San Francisco Municipal Transportation Agency
- Locale: San Francisco, California
- Termini: 4th and King; Judah and La Playa (Ocean Beach)
- Stations: 37

Service
- Type: Light rail/streetcar
- System: Muni Metro
- Operator: San Francisco Municipal Railway
- Rolling stock: Siemens LRV4
- Daily ridership: 38,600 (June 2026)

History
- Opened: October 21, 1928

Technical
- Track gauge: 4 ft 8 1/2 in (1,435 mm) standard gauge
- Electrification: Overhead line, 600 V DC
Route map
N Judah highlighted in navy

The N Judah is a hybrid light rail/streetcar line of the Muni Metro system in San Francisco, California. The line is named after Judah Street that it runs along for much of its length, named after railroad engineer Theodore Judah. It links downtown San Francisco to the Cole Valley and Sunset neighborhoods. The line provides rail access to Golden Gate Park. It is the busiest line in the Muni Metro system, serving an average of 38,600 weekday passengers in June 2026. It was one of San Francisco's streetcar lines, beginning operation in 1928, and was partially converted to modern light-rail operation with the opening of the Muni Metro system in 1980. While many streetcar lines were converted to bus lines after World War II, the N Judah remained a streetcar line due to its use of the Sunset Tunnel.

== Route description ==
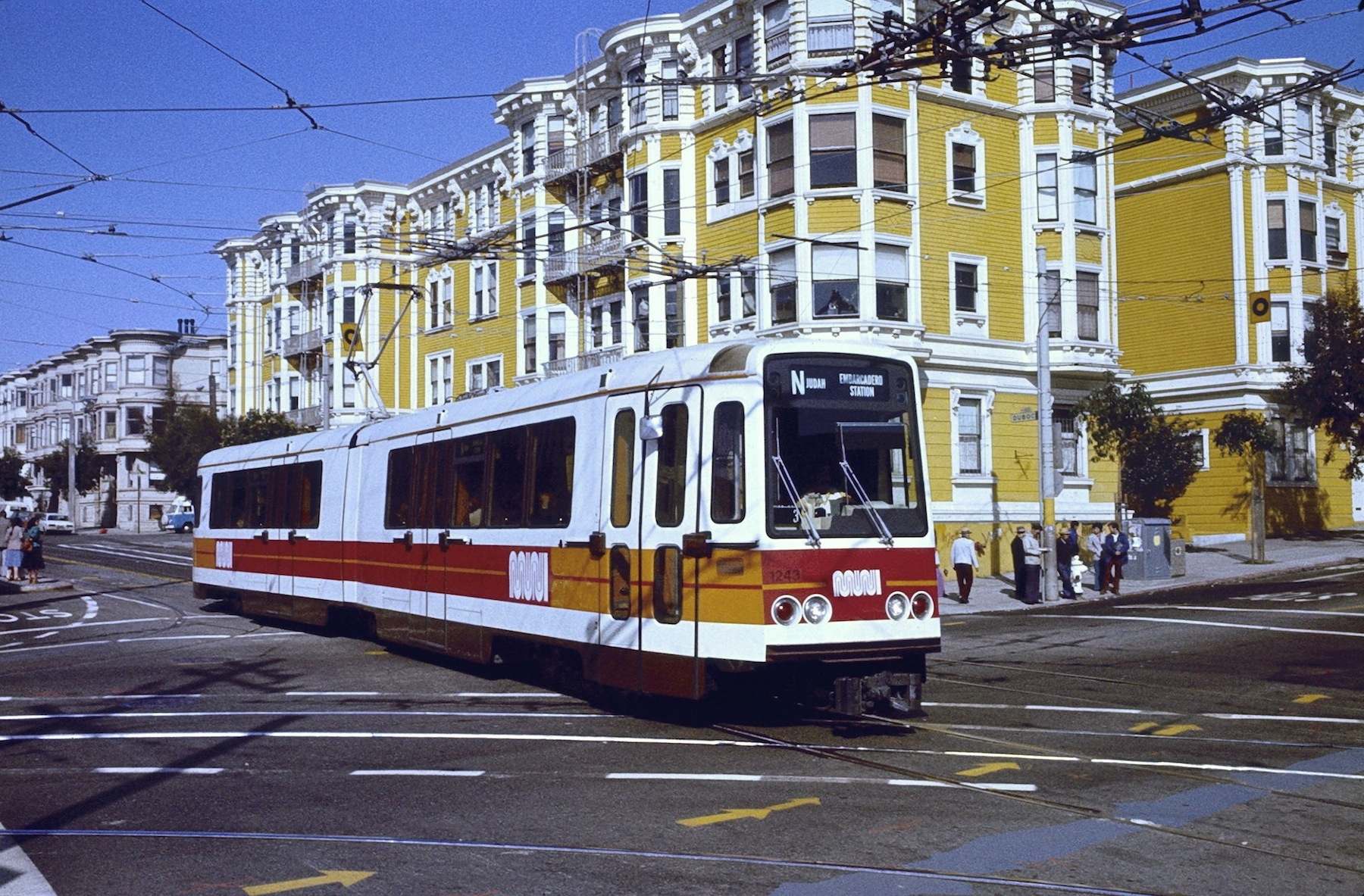
A Boeing LRV newly in service on the N Judah, entering the Duboce Portal on Duboce Avenue, in March 1980.

The line runs from the Caltrain depot in the Mission Bay district to Ocean Beach and the Great Highway in the Sunset District. From the Caltrain depot at Fourth and King Streets, it runs along King Street and the Embarcadero, passing by Oracle Park. It then enters the Market Street subway, which it shares with the five other Muni Metro lines. It exits the tunnel at Church Street and, after a brief stretch along Duboce Avenue to Duboce Park, enters the older Sunset Tunnel. This tunnel serves to avoid a hill and contains no underground stations. From the western end of the tunnel, the route goes along Carl Street, past UCSF-Parnassus Campus, on Irving Street, until it turns onto 9th Avenue for one block and reaches Judah Street, which the N runs on for the rest of its route. On Judah between 9th Avenue and 19th Avenue the N runs on a right-of-way that is slightly raised above the surrounding street. There is a loop in the intersection at Judah, La Playa and Great Highway that the N uses to turn around.

=== Operation ===
As with all Muni lines, service begins around 5 a.m. on weekdays, 6 a.m. on Saturdays, and 8 a.m. on Sundays and holidays. Daytime headways are 10 minutes on weekdays and 12 minutes on weekends. The line largely uses two-car (150-foot (46 m)) trains.

Service is provided by overnight Owl buses on the N Owl route during the hours that rail service is not running. On weekends, the N Judah Bus service runs from 5 am until the start of rail service. The bus lines largely follow the rail line, but use surface streets to parallel sections where the rail line has dedicated rights-of-way.

== History ==
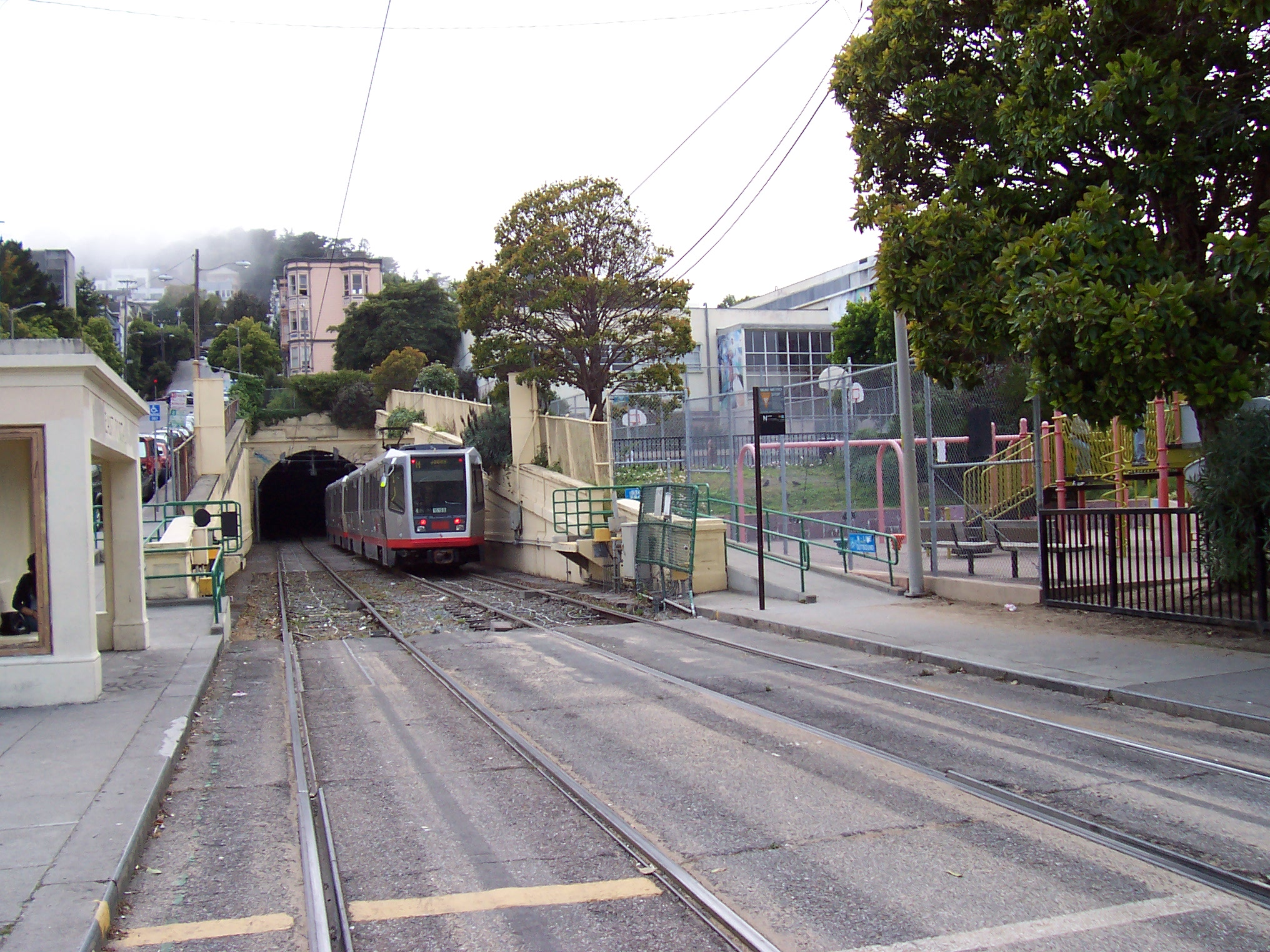
N Judah train entering the eastern portal of the Sunset Tunnel.

On January 10, 1998, Muni opened the Muni Metro Extension to 4th and King/Caltrain. It was originally served by a temporary shuttle service, the E Embarcadero, which ran between Embarcadero station and 4th and King/Caltrain. On August 22, 1998, the E Embarcadero line was eliminated and the N Judah line was extended in its place.

A variety of service changes took place with the introduction of full service on the T Third Street line on April 7, 2007. The N Judah was cut back to Embarcadero station; the surface section on the Embarcadero was served only by the T Third Street line, plus the J Church line at peak hours. The changes were unpopular with the public; they caused severe delays in the Market Street subway and forced N Judah riders to transfer to reach the Caltrain station when they previously did not. On June 30, 2007, Muni reversed several of the changes; the J Church and N Judah were restored to their previous configuration. On December 5, 2009, the N Judah was cut to Embarcadero on weekends as part of widespread service reductions. Weekend service was re-extended on October 15, 2011.

After concerns from riders of constant overcrowding of the trains on the N Judah line, Muni debuted an express bus route called the NX Judah Express on June 13, 2011. Starting off as a pilot program, the NX (stylized as N^{x}) was intended to relieve overcrowding during rush hours every ten minutes. It followed the western end of the N Judah route from Ocean Beach to 19th Avenue, then operated nonstop from there to the Financial District where it terminated at Bush and Montgomery Streets. Due to the COVID-19 pandemic, NX service was suspended and has not been restored.

In September 2016, Muni began running a pair of one-car shuttles between Embarcadero station and Carl and Hillway during morning rush hour to reduce crowding on the inner section of the line. A study after one month showed the shuttles had increased capacity on the inner part of the line by 18% and reduced the number of passengers unable to board overcrowded trains by 63%. In March 2018, the SFMTA board voted to shorten rush-hour headways from 7 minutes to 4 minutes, but to only use one-car trains on weekends. The changes were to take effect in the summer.

=== COVID-19 ===
On March 30, 2020, Muni Metro service was replaced with buses due to the COVID-19 pandemic.

Light-rail service returned in August 2020, with the routes reconfigured to improve reliability in the subway. N Judah service was not substantially changed, except for stops at 5th Avenue / 6th Avenue replacing former stops at 4th Avenue and 7th Avenue. Light-rail service was re-replaced with buses on August 25 due to issues with malfunctioning overhead wire splices and the need to quarantine control center staff after a COVID-19 case.

N Judah light-rail service resumed on May 15, 2021.

=== Future ===
Plans, according to the SFMTA Rail Capacity Strategy, include a new subway tunnel that connects the Market Street subway to 9th Avenue. Additionally, the N Judah line will be rebuilt to run three-car trains. Further plans include a non-revenue L Taraval to N Judah connector, which may run on 46th Avenue.

== Station listing ==
Station/Stop	Neighborhood	Muni Metro lines	Notes and connections
4th and King	Mission Bay	T Third Street	Caltrain; Muni: 15, 30, 45; Flixbus, Mission Bay Shuttle, Tahoe Convoy
2nd and King	Mission Bay		Serves Oracle Park
Brannan	South Beach		
Folsom	South Beach		
Embarcadero	Financial District	J Church K Ingleside L Taraval M Ocean View S Shuttle	BART: F Market & Wharves; California; SF Ferry Terminal; Muni: 1, 2, 6, 7X, 9, 9R, 12, 14, 14R, 14X, 21, 30X, 31, 41, 81X, 82X; Golden Gate Transit, Presidio Go Shuttle, SamTrans
Montgomery	Financial District	J Church K Ingleside L Taraval M Ocean View S Shuttle	BART: F Market & Wharves; Muni: 2, 3, 5, 5R, 6, 7, 7X, 8, 8AX, 8BX, 9, 9R, 10, 15, 21, 30, 31, 45, 81X, Geary BRT (38, 38R); AC Transit, Golden Gate Transit, SamTrans
Powell	Mid-Market, Civic Center, Tenderloin	(at Union Sq/Market St)	BART: F Market & Wharves; Powell–Hyde, Powell–Mason; Muni: 5, 5R, 6, 7, 7X, 8, 8AX, 8BX, 9, 9R, 15, 21, 27, 30, 31, 45, 81X; AC Transit, SamTrans
Civic Center	Mid-Market, Civic Center, Tenderloin	J Church K Ingleside L Taraval M Ocean View S Shuttle	BART: F Market & Wharves; Muni: 5, 5R, 6, 7, 9, 9R, 19, 21, 83X; Regional bus services: AC Transit, Golden Gate Transit, SamTrans
Van Ness	Mid-Market, Civic Center, Tenderloin	J Church K Ingleside L Taraval M Ocean View S Shuttle	F Market & Wharves; Muni: 6, 7, 9, 9R, Van Ness BRT (47, 49, 79X); Regional bus services: AC Transit, SamTrans
Duboce and Church	Duboce Triangle	(at separate platform)	Muni: 22
Duboce and Noe	Duboce Triangle		East end of the Sunset Tunnel.
Carl and Cole	Cole Valley		West end of the Sunset Tunnel.; Muni: 37, 43
Carl and Stanyan	Cole Valley		
Carl and Hillway	Cole Valley		
UCSF Parnassus	Sunset District		UCSF Shuttle lines
Irving and 5th Avenue (EB); Irving and 6th Avenue (WB)	Sunset District		
Irving and 8th Avenue (EB); 9th Avenue and Irving (WB)	Sunset District		Muni: 44
Judah and 9th Avenue	Sunset District		Muni: 6, 43, 44, 66
Judah and 12th Avenue	Sunset District		
Judah and Funston	Sunset District		
Judah and 15th Avenue (EB); Judah and 16th Avenue (WB)	Sunset District		
Judah and 19th Avenue	Sunset District		Muni: 28, 28R
Judah and 22nd Avenue (EB); Judah and 23rd Avenue (WB)	Sunset District		
Judah and 25th Avenue	Sunset District		
Judah and 28th Avenue	Sunset District		
Judah and 31st Avenue	Sunset District		
Judah and 34th Avenue	Sunset District		
Judah and Sunset	Sunset District		Muni: 29
Judah and 40th Avenue	Sunset District		
Judah and 43rd Avenue	Sunset District		
Judah and 46th Avenue	Sunset District		Muni: 18
Judah and La Playa	Sunset District		Serves Ocean Beach
