= Judah and 15th Avenue / Judah and 16th Avenue stations =

Muni Metro light rail stops in San Francisco

Judah and 15th Avenue Judah and 16th Avenue
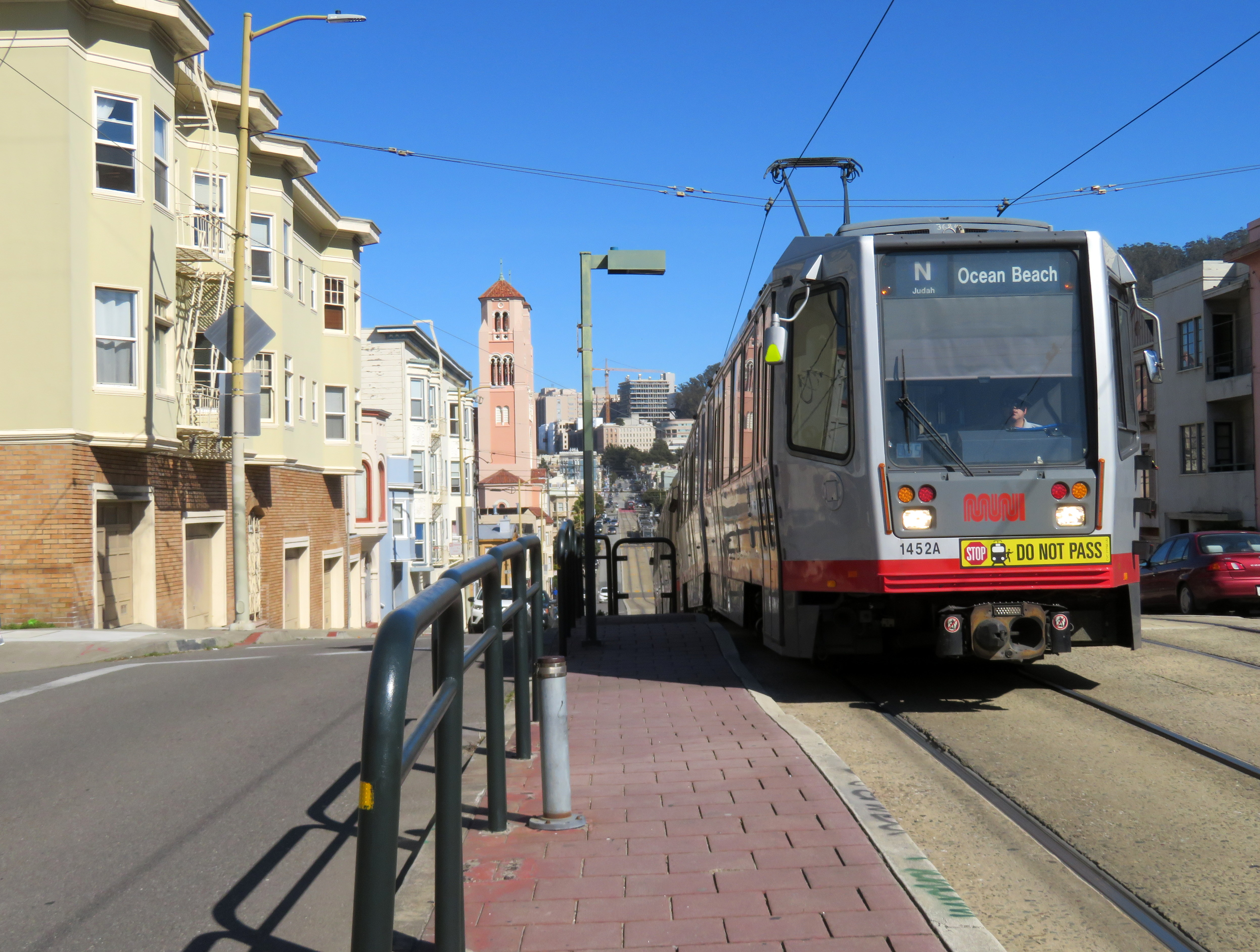
- A westbound train at Judah and 16th Avenue in March 2019

General information
- Location: Judah Street at 15th and 16th Avenues; San Francisco, California
- Coordinates: 37°45′43″N 122°28′26″W
- Platforms: 2 side platforms
- Tracks: 2

Construction
- Accessible: No

History
- Opened: October 21, 1928
- Rebuilt: 1978

Services
Preceding station	Muni	Following station
Judah and 19th Avenue toward Ocean Beach	N Judah	Judah and Funston toward 4th and King
Location

Judah and 15th Avenue / Judah and 16th Avenue stations are a pair of light rail stops on the Muni Metro N Judah line, located in the Sunset District neighborhood of San Francisco, California. The eastbound stop is located on Judah Street at 15th Avenue, while westbound trains stop on Judah Street at 16th Avenue. The stops opened with the N Judah line on October 21, 1928. The station has two short side platforms in the middle of Judah Street (traffic islands) where passengers board or depart from trains. The station is not accessible to people with disabilities.

The stop is also served by the N Bus and N Owl bus routes, which provide service along the N Judah line during the early morning and late night hours respectively when trains do not operate.

In March 2014, Muni released details of the proposed implementation of their Transit Effectiveness Project (later rebranded MuniForward), which included a variety of stop changes for the N Judah line. Under that plan – which will be implemented as the N Judah Rapid Project – the short boarding islands at 15th and 16th Avenues will be extended to accommodate longer trains.
