= Judah and 28th Avenue station =

Muni Metro light rail stop in San Francisco

Judah and 28th Avenue
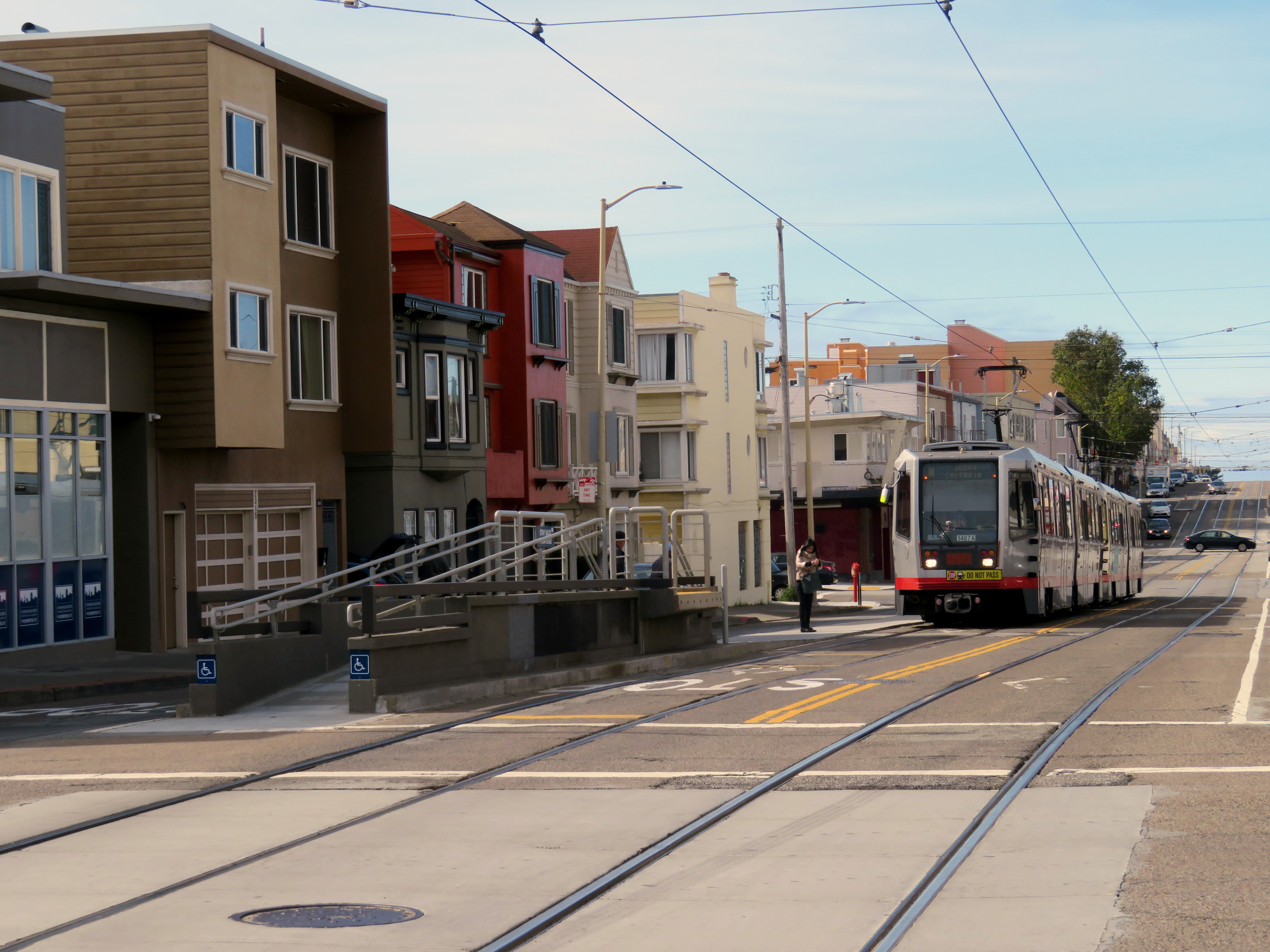
- A eastbound train at Judah and 28th Avenue in February 2018

General information
- Location: Judah Street at 28th Avenue; San Francisco, California
- Coordinates: 37°45′41″N 122°29′12″W
- Platforms: 2 side platforms
- Tracks: 2
- Connections: Muni: N^{x}

Construction
- Accessible: Yes

History
- Opened: October 21, 1928
- Rebuilt: November 10, 2014–March 31, 2015

Services
Preceding station	Muni	Following station
Judah and 31st Avenue toward Ocean Beach	N Judah	Judah and 25th Avenue toward 4th and King
Location

Judah and 28th Avenue is a light rail stop on the Muni Metro N Judah line, located in the Sunset District neighborhood of San Francisco, California. The stop opened with the N Judah line on October 21, 1928. The station has two side platforms in the middle of Judah Street (traffic islands) where passengers board or depart from trains. The station also has mini-high platforms providing access to people with disabilities.

== Platform construction ==
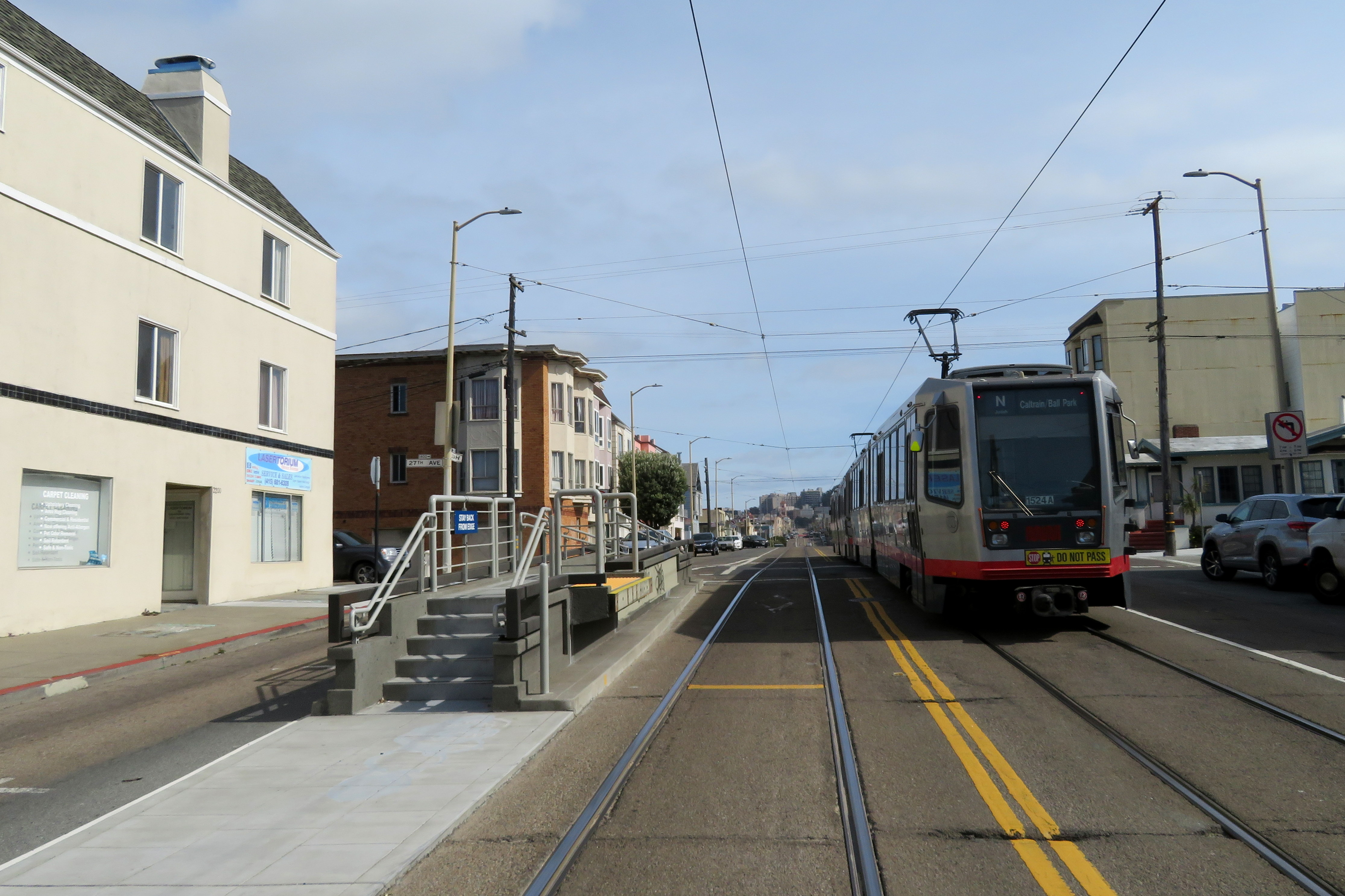
An inbound train passes the accessible outbound platform

In March 2014, Muni released details of the proposed implementation of their Transit Effectiveness Project (later rebranded MuniForward). A variety of stop changes were proposed for the N Judah line, including extensions of the existing boarding islands at 28th Avenue.

Two subprojects – 28th Avenue, and Irving Street between 9th Avenue and Arguello – were selected for early implementation in coordination with rail replacement and seismic refitting of the Sunset Tunnel. 28th Avenue was prioritized for construction of handicapped accessible platforms to halve the 17-block, 1-mile gap between existing accessible stops at Judah and Sunset and Judah and 19th Avenue. Muni began construction of the eastbound platform on November 10, 2014. The eastbound platform was placed in service on February 6, 2015, followed by the westbound platform on March 31.

== Bus service ==
The stop is also served by the N^{x} bus, a weekday peak hours service that provides express service from the east end of the N Judah line to the Financial District, plus the N Bus and N Owl bus routes, which provide service along the N Judah line during the early morning and late night hours respectively when trains do not operate.
