= Cole Valley, San Francisco =

Neighborhood of San Francisco, US

Cole Valley
- Neighborhood
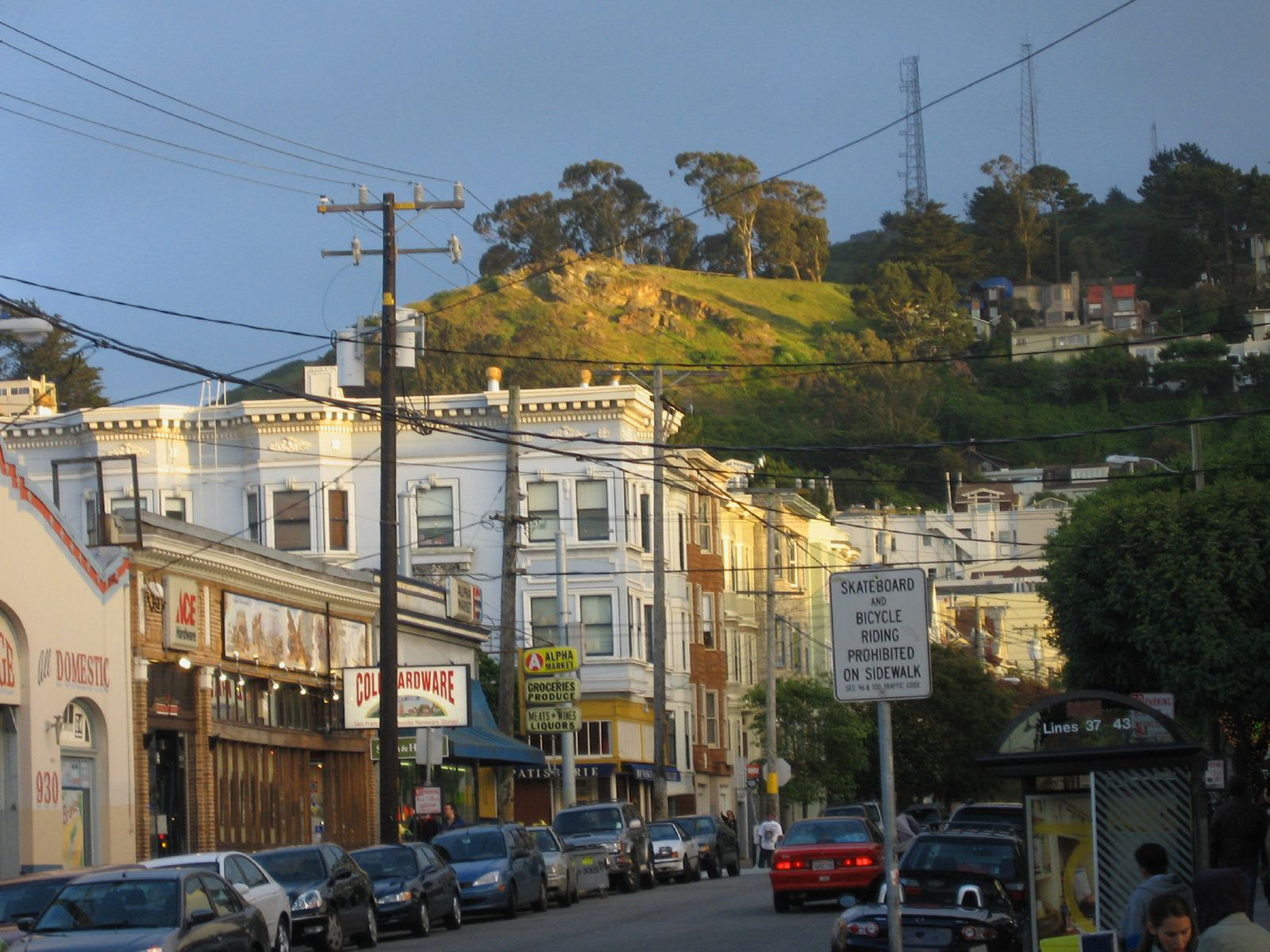
- Cole Valley from below

- Location within Central San Francisco
- Coordinates: 37.76485°N 122.44975°W
- Country: United States
- State: California
- City: San Francisco

Government
  - Supervisor: Bilal Mahmood
  - State Assembly: Matt Haney (D)
  - State Senator: Scott Wiener (D)
  - U. S. Rep.: Nancy Pelosi (D)

Area
  - Total: 0.169 sq mi (0.44 km^{2})
  - Land: 0.169 sq mi (0.44 km^{2})

Population (2008)
  - Total: 4,192
  - Density: 24,740/sq mi (9,550/km^{2})
- ZIP Code: 94117
- Area codes: 415/628

Cole Valley is a small neighborhood in San Francisco, California. It borders Golden Gate Park to the north, Haight-Ashbury to the northeast, the Castro to the east, and Twin Peaks to the south. Near Kezar Stadium, Cole Valley is the smallest neighborhood in the city.

== Location ==
The neighborhood is bordered on the west by Stanyan Street and the Sutro Forest, on the south by Tank Hill, and on the east by Clayton Street. The main commercial strip is condensed into three blocks along Cole Street and part of Carl Street. This strip includes more than a dozen restaurants and cafés.

Cole Valley is surrounded by the neighborhoods of Inner Sunset, Haight Ashbury, Buena Vista/Ashbury Heights, Corona Heights, Clarendon Heights, and Forest Knolls.

== History ==
Cole Valley grew up around the streetcar stop at the entrance to the Sunset Tunnel at the intersection of Carl and Cole Streets. That intersection is still the center of the neighborhood's small business district, and the N Judah light rail line still stops there.

Cole Valley was popular with dot-commers during the late 1990s dot-com bubble. Craig Newmark, founder of Craigslist, is a former resident. The area is home to young professionals, some University of California, San Francisco residents, staff and neighborhood families since the early 1960s.
