= Judah and Sunset station =

Muni Metro light rail stop in San Francisco

Judah and Sunset
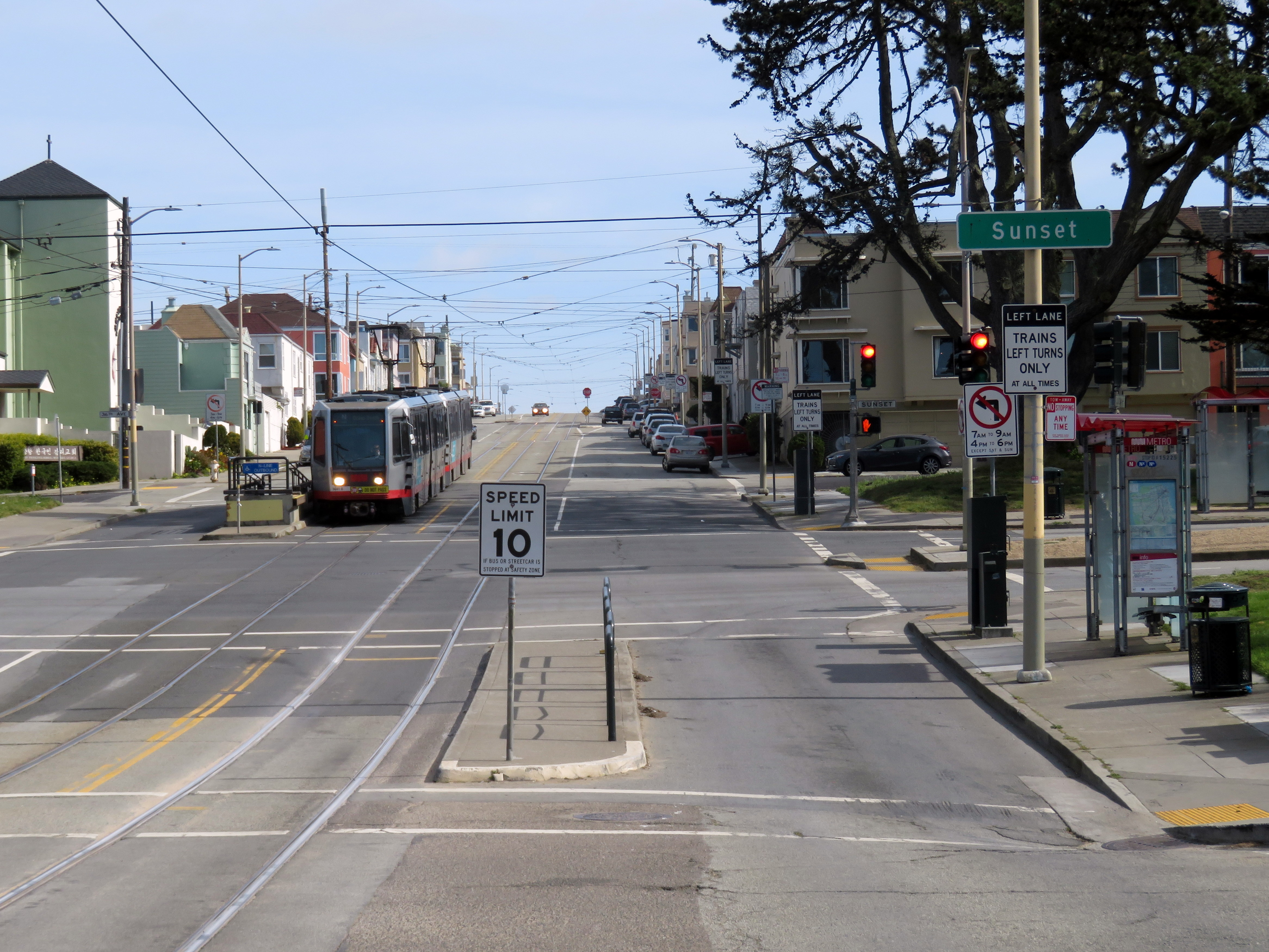
- A westbound train at Judah and Sunset in February 2018

General information
- Location: Judah Street at Sunset Boulevard; San Francisco, California
- Coordinates: 37°45′39″N 122°29′44″W
- Platforms: 2 side platforms
- Tracks: 2
- Connections: Muni: 29, N^{x}

Construction
- Accessible: Yes

History
- Opened: October 21, 1928

Services
Preceding station	Muni	Following station
Judah and 40th Avenue toward Ocean Beach	N Judah	Judah and 34th Avenue toward 4th and King
Location

Judah and Sunset station is a light rail stop on the Muni Metro N Judah line, located in the Sunset District neighborhood of San Francisco, California. The station opened with the N Judah line on October 21, 1928. The station has two short side platforms in the middle of Judah Street (traffic islands) where passengers board or depart from trains. The station also has mini-high platforms providing access to people with disabilities.

The station is located at the intersection of Judah Street with Sunset Boulevard, which is flanked by 37th Avenue on the west and 36th Avenue on the east. The curb-level inbound platform is located between 37th Avenue and Sunset, with the accessible mini-high platform west of 37th Avenue. Both the curb-level and accessible portions of the outbound platform are located between Sunset and 36th Avenue.

== History ==
In March 2014, Muni released details of the proposed implementation of their Transit Effectiveness Project (later rebranded MuniForward), which included a variety of stop changes for the N Judah line. Under that plan – which will be implemented as the N Judah Rapid Project – the platforms will be moved to the opposite sides of Sunset Boulevard so that trains can cross through the intersection before stopping.

== Bus service ==
The stop is also served by route 29 and the N^{x} bus, a weekday peak hours service that provides express service from the east end of the N Judah line to the Financial District, plus the N Bus and N Owl bus routes, which provide service along the N Judah line during the early morning and late night hours respectively when trains do not operate.
