= 6 Hayes/Parnassus =

Trolleybus line in San Francisco, CA, US

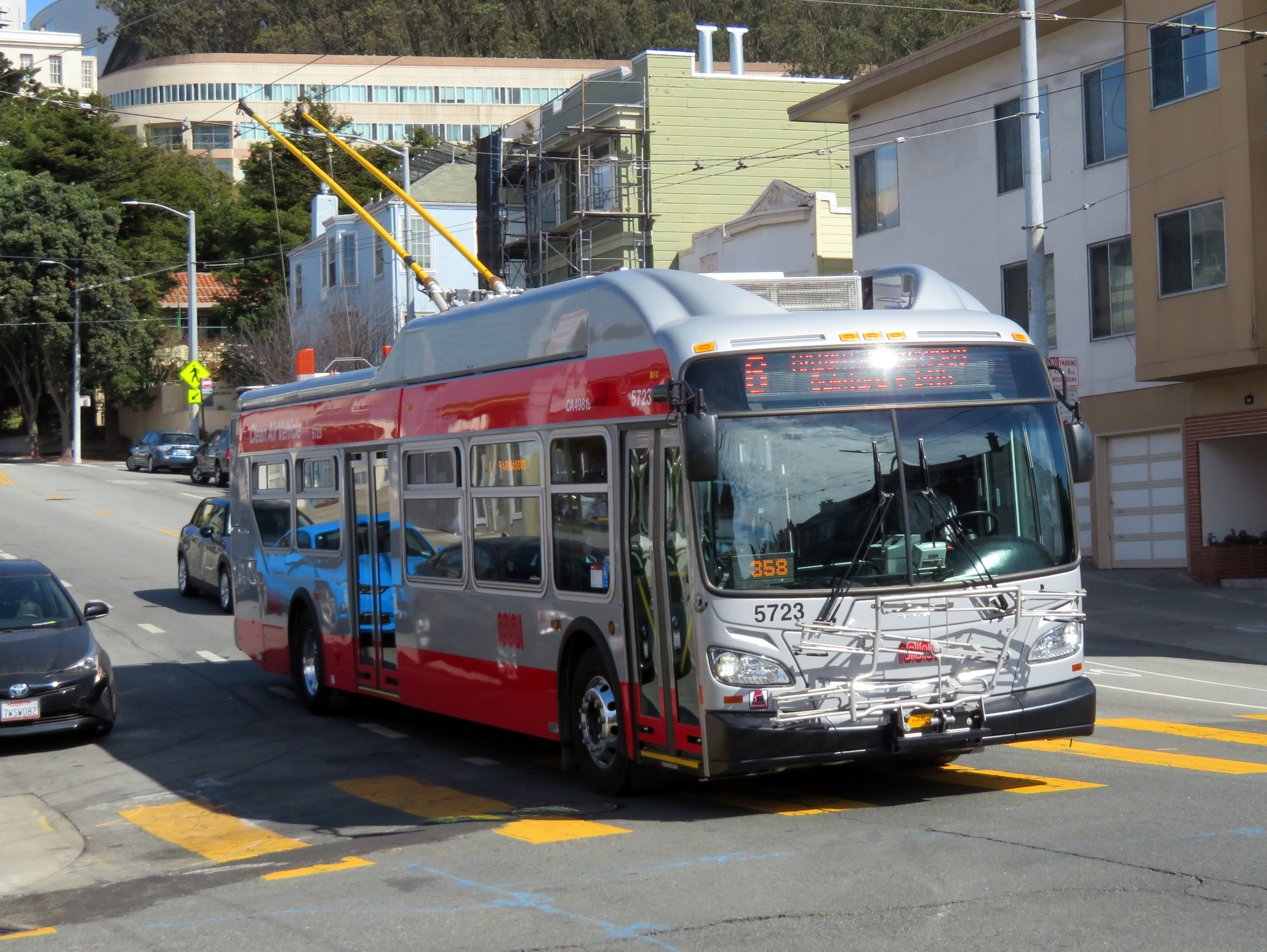
- Route 6 trolleybus on Judah Street in September 2018

Overview
- System: Muni trolleybus network
- Operator: San Francisco Municipal Railway
- Vehicle: New Flyer XT40
- Began service: June 10, 1906

Route
- Locale: San Francisco, California
- Start: Steuart and Market (Ferry Plaza) (Formerly); Civic Center station (currently)
- End: Quintara and 14th Avenue
- Length: 5 miles (8.0 km)
- Other routes: 7 Haight/Noriega
- Daily ridership: 4,400 (June 2024)
- Map: 6 Haight/Parnassus

6 Hayes/Parnassus, formerly 6 Haight/Parnassus and 6 Parnassus, is a trolleybus line operated by the San Francisco Municipal Railway (Muni). It connects the Financial District to the Inner Sunset and Forest Hill via Hayes Valley.

== Route description ==
From Market and Hyde, trolleybuses run outbound on Hayes Street. The route zig-zags south and west on Masonic Avenue, Frederick Street, Clayton Street, Parnassus Avenue, Judah Street, 9th Avenue, Ortega Street, 10th Avenue, and Quintara Street to a loop at 14th Avenue next to Golden Gate Heights Park. Going back inbound, trolleybuses follow that route, however turn north onto Laguna Street, then continues east on Grove Street. It then completes the loop by turning north onto Polk, east onto McAllister, then south onto Hyde.

== History ==
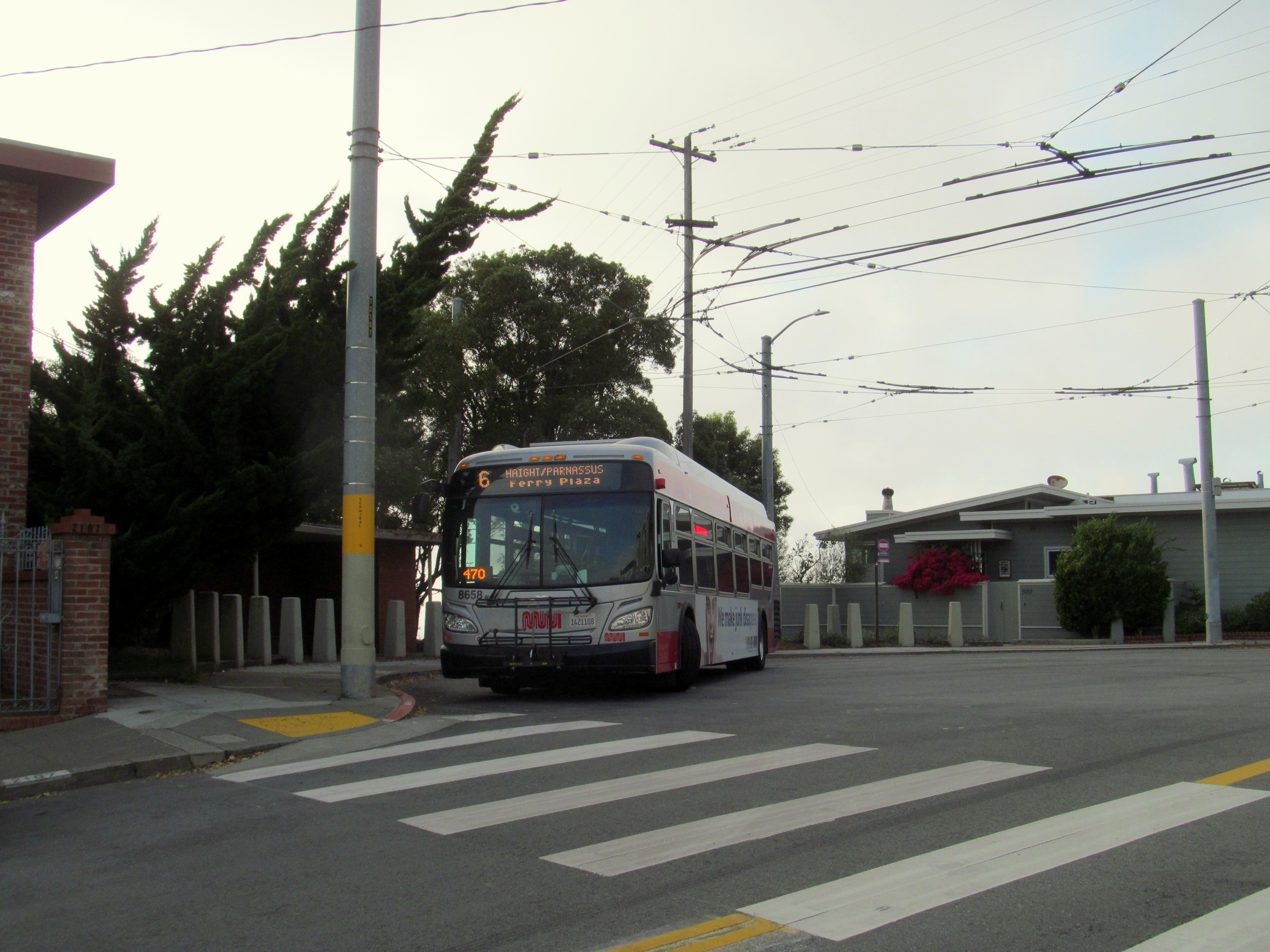
The outer terminus at 14th and Quintara, September 2017

United Railroads of San Francisco opened their Hayes and Masonic streetcar line on June 10, 1906, running from the Ferry Building to Third and Parnassus. It acquired the number 6 in 1909, being the sixth of the United Railroads' lines to turn off Market Street. The outer end was extended via Parnassus Avenue and 9th Avenue to Pacheco Street on June 16, 1912 – the highest point reached by any Muni rail route, including cable cars. The extended route ran on Market, Haight, Masonic, Frederick, Clayton, Carl, Stanyan, Judah, and 9th. On February 7, 1916, the line was rerouted to run on Haight Street rather than Hayes Street and Oak Street. The line was renamed to 6 Haight and Masonic at that time.

Motor coach service began on July 3, 1948, replacing streetcars along the route; trolleybuses began operations on July 3, 1949. The block on Ninth Avenue south of Ortega Street was abandoned, and the line was extended over Ortega Street, 10th Avenue, and Quintara Street to a new loop at 14th Avenue. Trolleybuses were also rerouted onto Parnassus Street between Frederick Street and Stanyan Street to avoid sharing the street with the N Judah. At the same time, several blocks of Haight Street near Market Street were made westbound-only, forcing eastbound trolleybuses to use Laguna Street and Page Street. The inbound terminal was also changed from the Ferry Building to the Transbay Terminal.

The line was renamed 6 Parnassus in 1976. On July 16, 1980, the inbound terminal was changed to the Transbay Terminal; this was later reversed, then reestablished as a replacement for the F Market when that service was extended to Fisherman's Wharf. In 2014, the SFMTA built an eastbound transit-only lane on the eastern blocks of Haight Street, allowing routes 6 and 7 to avoid the jog onto Page Street. The route's name was changed to the current 6 Haight/Parnassus in 2015.

Service was temporarily discontinued in April 2020 as a result of the COVID-19 pandemic. On August 14, 2021, the 52 Excelsior route was extended to cover the portion of the route from 9th Avenue and Judah Street to Quintara Street and 14th Avenue, while the 66 Quintara was extended to cover the portion along Parnassus Avenue and Judah Street. Route 6 Haight/Parnassus returned to service on July 9, 2022; the extensions of routes 52 and 66 were discontinued. Due to a budget crisis as part of the Summer 2025 Muni Service Cuts, the 6 and the 21 Hayes was merged together on June 21, 2025.
