= 7 Haight/Noriega =

Bus route in San Francisco, California

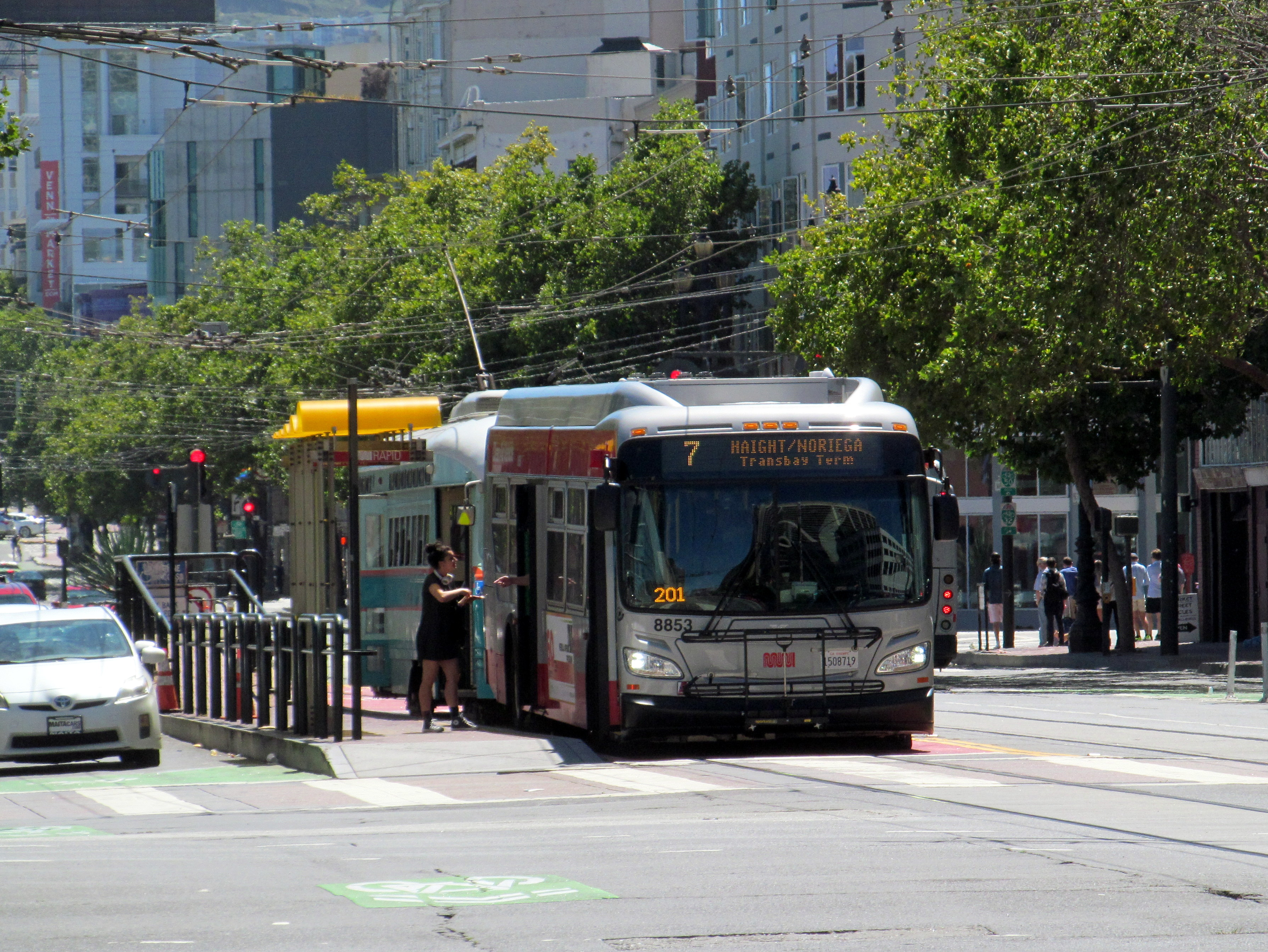
- 7 Haight/Noriega bus at Market Street and Van Ness Avenue, June 2017

Overview
- System: San Francisco Municipal Railway
- Operator: San Francisco Municipal Railway
- Vehicle: New Flyer XDE60

Route
- Locale: San Francisco, California
- Start: Salesforce Transit Center
- Via: Haight Street, Lincoln Way, Noriega Street
- End: Ortega and 48th Avenue
- Length: 8.5 miles (13.7 km)
- Other routes: 6 Hayes/Parnassus; 7X Noriega Express
- Daily ridership: 9,400 (2019)
- Map: 7 Haight/Noriega Map

7 Haight/Noriega is a bus route operated by the San Francisco Municipal Railway (Muni). It connects the central business district to the Outer Sunset via Haight-Ashbury.

== Route description ==
From the Salesforce Transit Center, buses run on Fremont Street to Market Street. The route runs on Market until turning off at Haight Street, which the 7 follows for its length. At Golden Gate Park, buses turn south on Stanyan then right on Lincoln. The inbound and outbound routes split to use 22nd and 23rd Avenues, respectively, until turning on Noriega. Buses loop around at the Great Highway and Ortega, terminating at 48th Avenue.

=== 7X Noriega Express ===
The 7X Noriega Express was an express bus that served the outer segment of the line with express service downtown. It diverted from the 7 between Lincoln and Market. The inbound terminus was the Ferry Terminal Plaza. The 7X was indefinitely discontinued in 2020 amid the COVID-19 pandemic.

== History ==
The 7 Haight and Ocean line extended to 49th and La Playa via Lincoln and a former Park and Ocean Railroad right of way through Golden Gate Park. The line was truncated to 48th and Lincoln in 1947 after a bridge was deemed unsafe. Streetcar service ended on July 3, 1948, and the route was thereafter served by trolleybuses.

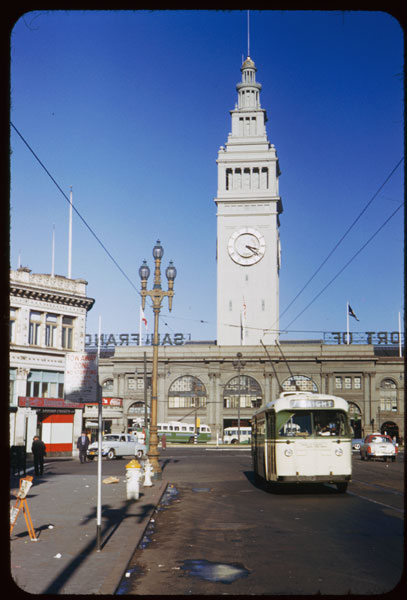
A 7 Haight trolleybus leaving the Ferry Building in 1953. The route number was retired in 2009 when the service was discontinued and the 71 Haight/Noriega absorbed riders on the route. (That service was renumbered 7 in 2015.)

By 1952, the 7 terminated at Golden Gate Park, effectively a short turn of the 71 Haight/Noriega and 72 Haight/Sunset which both continued further south and west. The 72 was discontinued in 1983, being partially replaced by the 29 Sunset. The 7 Haight was discontinued in 2009.

The 71 was renumbered to 7 in 2015. Rapid buses were discontinued in 2017 and replaced with local service.
