= Sunset Tunnel =

Streetcar tunnel in San Francisco, California, U.S.

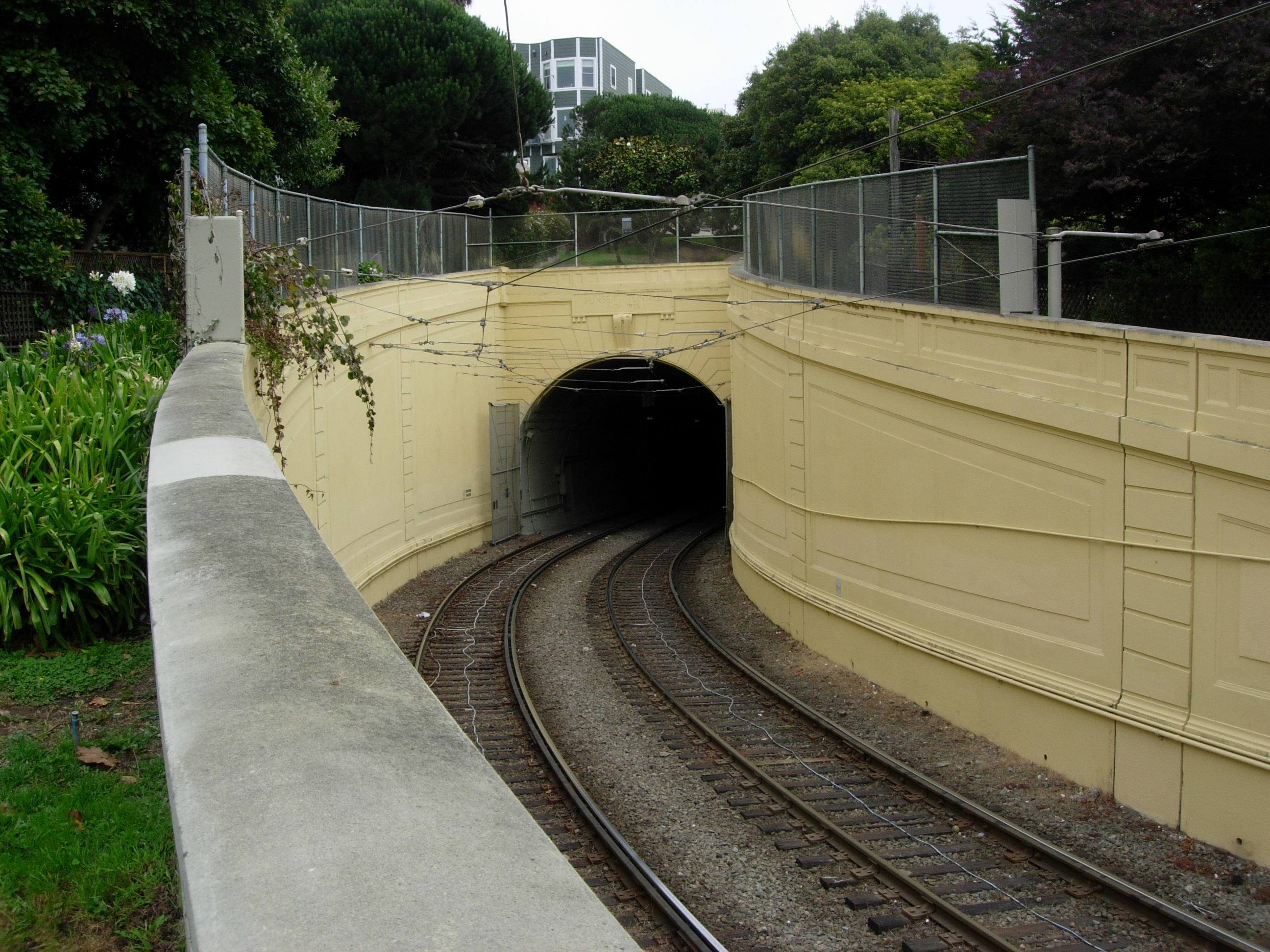
- The western portal of the Sunset Tunnel
- Interactive map of Sunset Tunnel

Overview
- Line: N Judah
- Location: San Francisco, California
- Coordinates: East portal: 37°46′09″N 122°26′04″W; West portal: 37°45′59″N 122°26′55″W
- System: Muni Metro
- Crosses: Buena Vista Park and nearby areas between Duboce Park and Richard Gamble Memorial Park
- Start: Duboce Ave & Noe St (Duboce Park)
- End: Carl St & Cole St (Richard Gamble Memorial Park)
- No. of stations: None

Operation
- Opened: October 21, 1928; 97 years ago
- Owner: San Francisco Municipal Transportation Agency
- Operator: San Francisco Municipal Railway
- Character: Tunnel for light rail/streetcar line

Technical
- Line length: 4,232 ft (1,290 m; 0.8015 mi)
- No. of tracks: 2
- Track gauge: 4 ft 8 1/2 in (1,435 mm) standard gauge
- Electrified: Overhead line, 600 V DC
- Tunnel clearance: 23 ft (7.0 m)

The Sunset Tunnel, originally known as the Duboce Tunnel, is a 4,232 ft (1,290 m)-long light rail/streetcar tunnel in San Francisco, California. The tunnel runs under the steep hill adjacent to Buena Vista Park and is used exclusively by the N Judah Muni Metro line.

The eastern entrance is located at Duboce and Noe streets on the south side of Duboce Park in the Duboce Triangle neighborhood, and the western portal is located in Richard Gamble Memorial Park near the intersection of Carl and Cole streets in the Cole Valley neighborhood.

== History ==
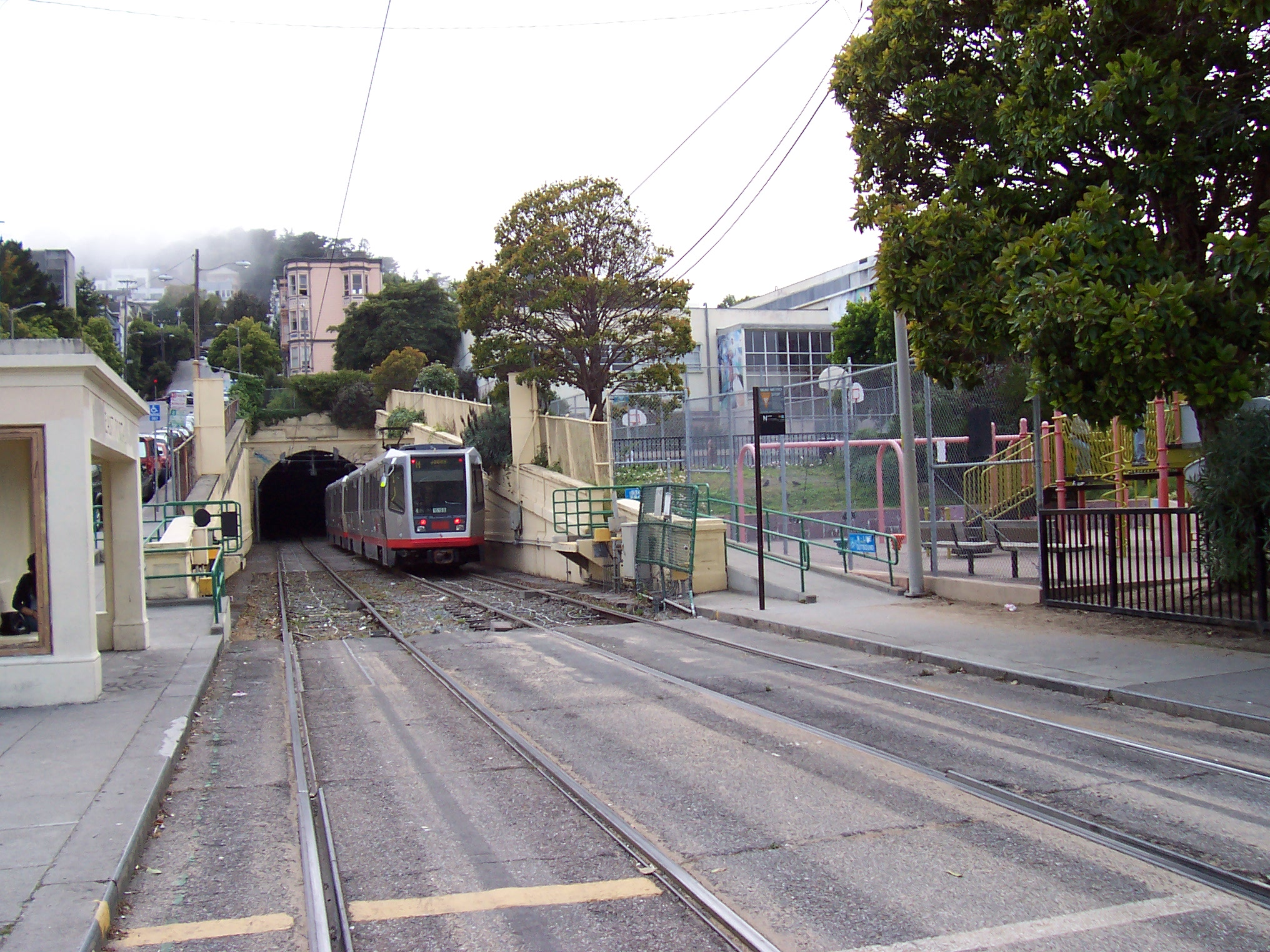
The N Judah entering the eastern portal of the Sunset Tunnel, by Duboce Park

=== Initial proposals ===
Bion J. Arnold proposed a Mission–Sunset Tunnel in his Report on the Improvement and Development of the Transportation Facilities of San Francisco of March 1913. In Arnold's scheme, the Mission–Sunset Tunnel would start at Eureka Valley station, which was proposed as the transfer station for passengers needing service through the Twin Peaks Tunnel. The Mission–Sunset Tunnel would serve as a feeder bringing rail, automobile, and pedestrian traffic from the Panhandle region to the planned Market Street subway. It would also improve service to the Sunset District from the Mission and other areas south of Market, as existing routes were circuitous or limited.

Arnold's plan called for a two-level tunnel, with a road and pedestrian tunnel similar in cross-section to the Stockton Street Tunnel above a two-track rail tunnel. Depending on the planned alignment and portal locations, the length of the Mission–Sunset Tunnel proposed by Arnold would have been 3,720–4,720 ft (1,130–1,440 m).

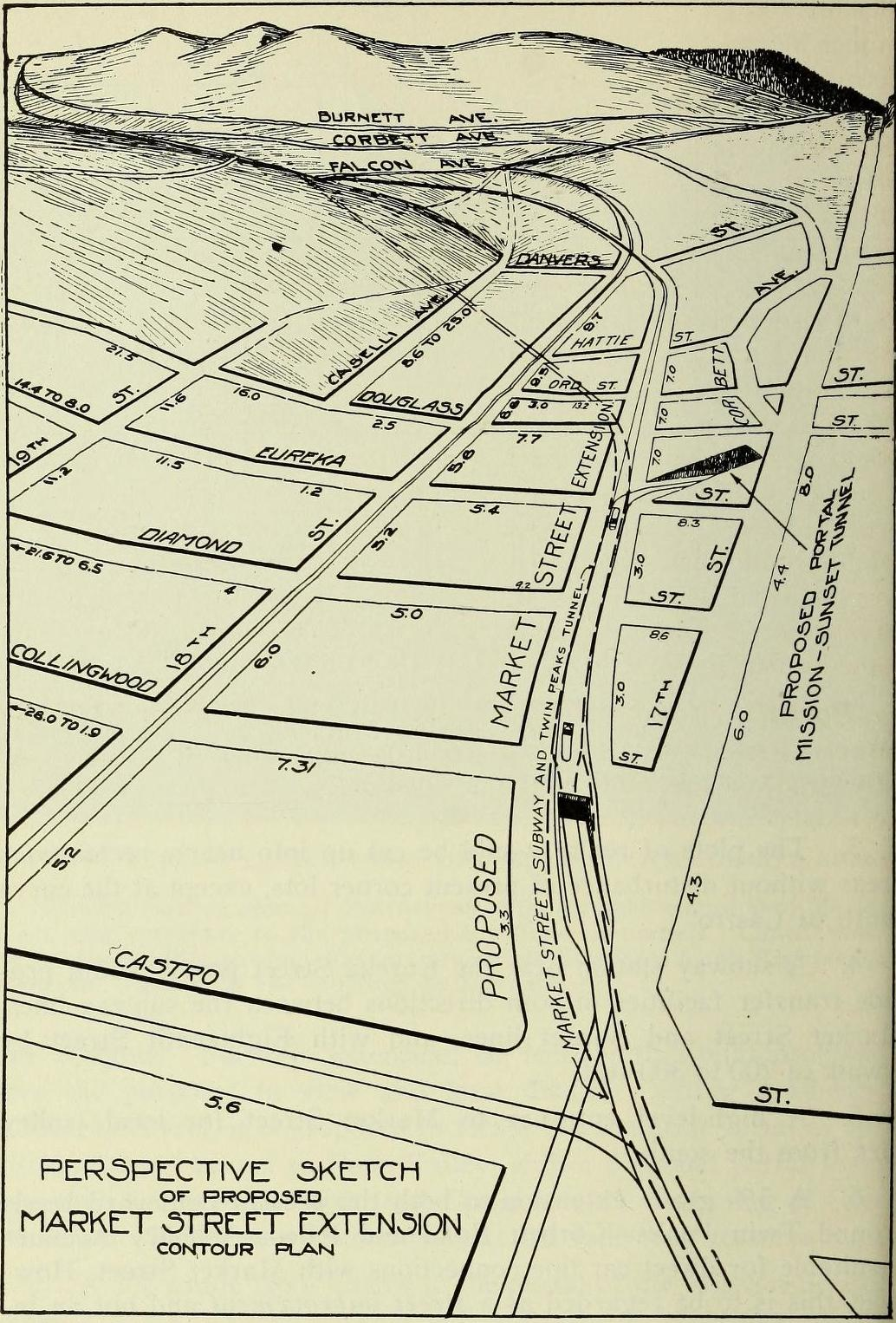
Sketch of Arnold's proposed Market Street extension (1913), with a Mission–Sunset Tunnel portal near Eureka & Market, per Plan 3

Mission–Sunset Tunnel proposals (1913)
	Plan No. 1	Plan No. 2	Plan No. 3
West portal	Carl & Cole	Frederick & Cole	
East portal	16th & Noe	17th & Castro	Market & Eureka (extension)
Length	4,720 ft (1,440 m)	4,400 ft (1,300 m)	3,720 ft (1,130 m)

Sunset Tunnel locations
1 East Portal (Duboce & Noe)
2 West Portal (Carl & Cole)
3 Proposed East Portal (1913, at Eureka Valley station as a transfer point for traffic through the Twin Peaks Tunnel)

However, further work on a tunnel to the Sunset District was postponed in favor of completing the Twin Peaks Tunnel, which opened to revenue service in June 1918. Soon afterwards, in July 1918, a Sunset Tunnel alignment matching the as-completed route along Duboce Avenue was proposed.

After the San Francisco Board of Supervisors appropriated funds for a tunnel into the Sunset in September 1921, City Engineer M.M. O'Shaughnessy was tasked with recommending a final alignment. He considered four routes, of which two relied on surface routes (one of these would run north from Laguna Honda), one was based on Arnold's 1913 proposed routing from the Eureka Valley station, and one matched the proposed Duboce route from 1918; of these four, O'Shaughnessy preferred the Duboce route as noted in a November 1921 Board meeting. The Board approved the Duboce alignment in a resolution passed on May 31, 1922 which also established the special assessment district. The route was opposed by several supervisors, who favored surface routes, but those were over the objections of Sunset residents, who preferred "the shorter and most direct [Duboce] route".

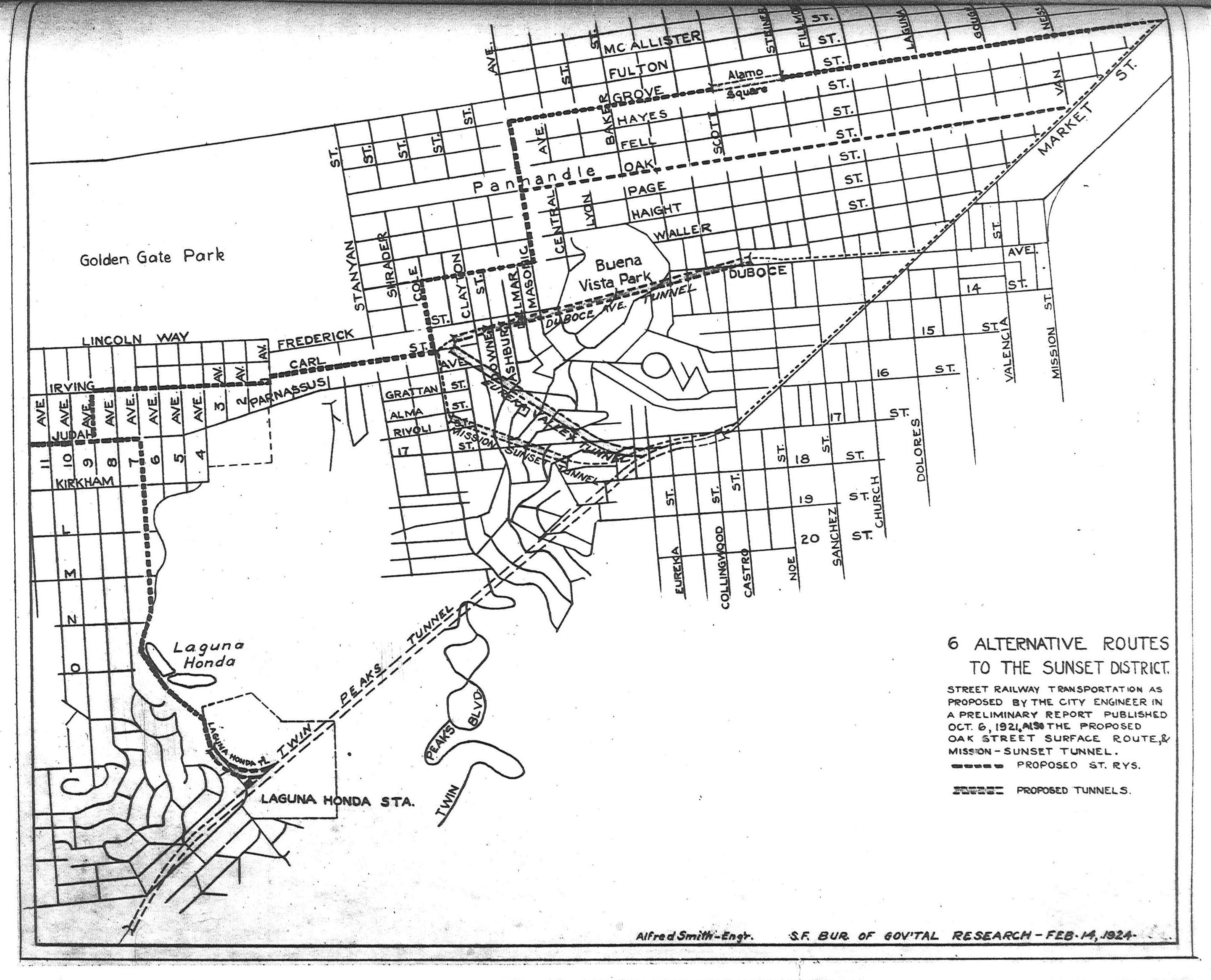
October 1921 study by City Engineer's office showing six proposed routes for a Sunset District Extension, including the selected Duboce alignment. Also note surface alignment along Grove, which included a short tunnel under Alamo Square.

=== Construction and opening ===
Funds for test bores were set aside in June 1922 and the City Engineer's report, including detailed plans and estimated costs, were filed three months later in September. As planned, the tunnel would be 4,250 feet (1,300 m) long and would cost US$1,500,000 (equivalent to $28,850,000 in 2025). The final route was not approved until April 6, 1925, due to "protracted political discussion."

The contract for the Sunset Tunnel was awarded on May 10, 1926 for the low bid of US$1,247,592 (equivalent to $22,900,000 in 2025), submitted by the Youdall Construction Company, who broke ground on the project on June 10, 1926. As designed, the Sunset Tunnel was 4,232 feet (1,290 m) long including approaches with a grade of 3%; inside, the width was 25 feet (7.6 m) and the vertical clearance was 18 ft 9 in (5.72 m) above the top of the rail. The total length of the two open cuts for the approaches was 261 feet (80 m); the tunnel was driven largely through serpentine rock. The tunnel was constructed using three drifts: a pilot drift at the crown, and two at the side walls. The pilot drift was accelerated in order to provide ventilation and to explore the geologic formations, and that crown drift was "holed-through" less than a year after groundbreaking, on March 11, 1927. Construction of the tunnel was completed on February 4, 1928 for a total cost of US$1,477,618 (equivalent to $27,710,000 in 2025). After the tunnel was nearly complete, a contract was awarded to build the rail line, but work was halted under an injunction that lasted from October 1927 to May 1928.

The tunnel was opened for revenue service on October 21, 1928 in a ceremony presided over by Mayor James Rolph. The new "N" line recorded the second-highest gross revenues of all streetcar lines shortly after opening. Both the Twin Peaks and Sunset tunnels were credited with spurring development in the Sunset District, with many of the homes built by Henry Doelger in the 1930s and 1940s.

=== Intrusion ===
Access to the tunnel is restricted to San Francisco Municipal Railway light rail trains only. Despite the access limitations, this tunnel is not well protected, and has been vandalized, copper cable has been stolen, and graffiti has been painted on the surfaces. From time to time, automobile drivers manage to drive their cars into the tunnel, including four separate incidents in February 2017 alone.

=== Trackway Improvement Project ===
The Sunset Tunnel Trackway Improvement Project replaced tracks and repaired key equipment inside the tunnel, including a new overhead contact system, fire sprinkler valve refurbishment, seismic upgrades, and rebuilt platforms at 28th Avenue. The work, which started in November 2014, was originally planned to finish by June 2015, but was not completed until October 2017. During some weekends, the tunnel was closed and N Judah was short-turned at Church & Duboce. Buses were used to continue service to Ocean Beach. A combination of additional needed work that was discovered during construction, plus nearby residents challenging a night work permit, resulted in delays to the project and an additional $4 million cost for a total of $23.3 million.
