= 44 O'Shaughnessy =

San Francisco bus route

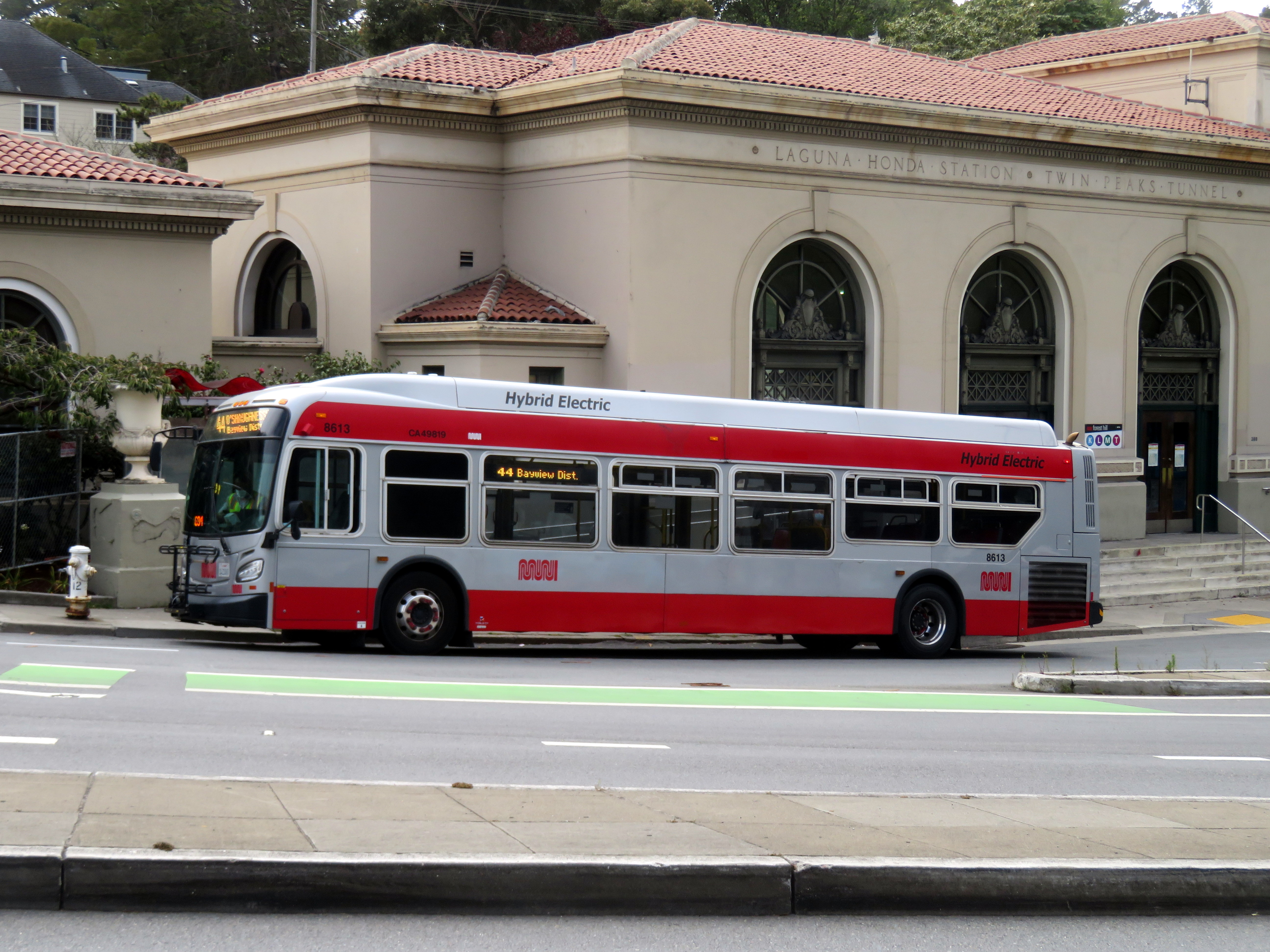
- 44 bus at Forest Hill station, August 2020

Overview
- Operator: San Francisco Municipal Railway
- Vehicle: New Flyer XDE40
- Began service: September 10, 1980

Route
- Locale: San Francisco, California
- Start: California and 6th Avenue
- Via: O'Shaughnessy Boulevard, Silver Avenue, Golden Gate Park
- End: Hudson and Newhall
- Daily ridership: 15,500 (2019)
- Map: 44 O'Shaughnessy

44 O'Shaughnessy is a bus line operated by the San Francisco Municipal Railway. The route and street which it serves are named in honor of Michael O'Shaughnessy, former city engineer who was instrumental in the development of Muni.

== History ==
The line was established on September 10, 1980, intended as a way to connect the Hunters Point, Inner Mission, Sunset District, and Richmond District access to Golden Gate Park, Glen Park station, and Forest Hill station. The northern segment of the new route was a partial replacement of the 10 Monterey, which was simultaneously rerouted. The northern terminal was shifted to 6th and California on January 27, 1982. Owl service on the eastern portion of the line began in 2016.

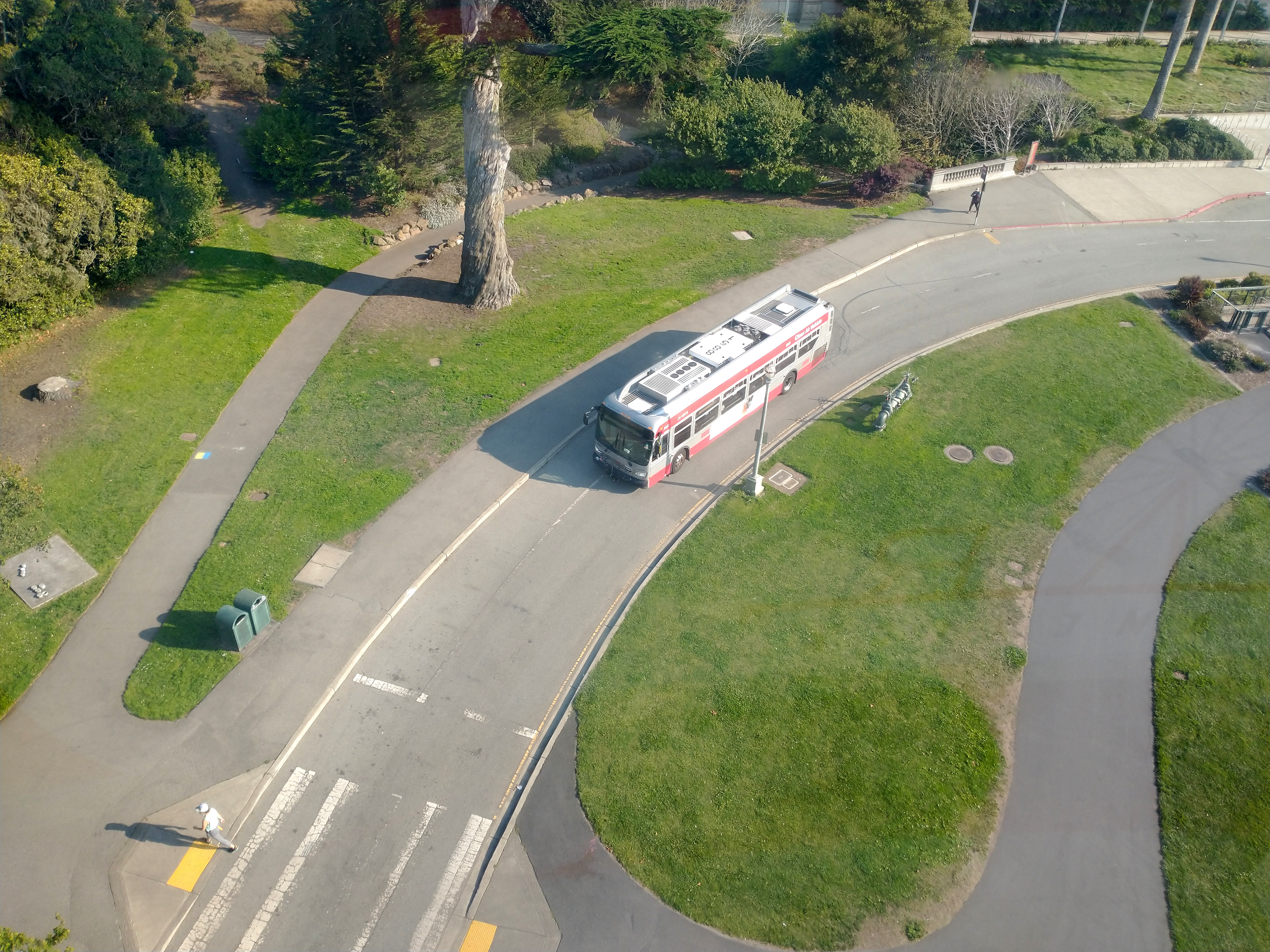
Traversing Golden Gate Park, September 2021
