= Judah and La Playa station =

Light rail stop in San Francisco, California, US

Judah and La Playa
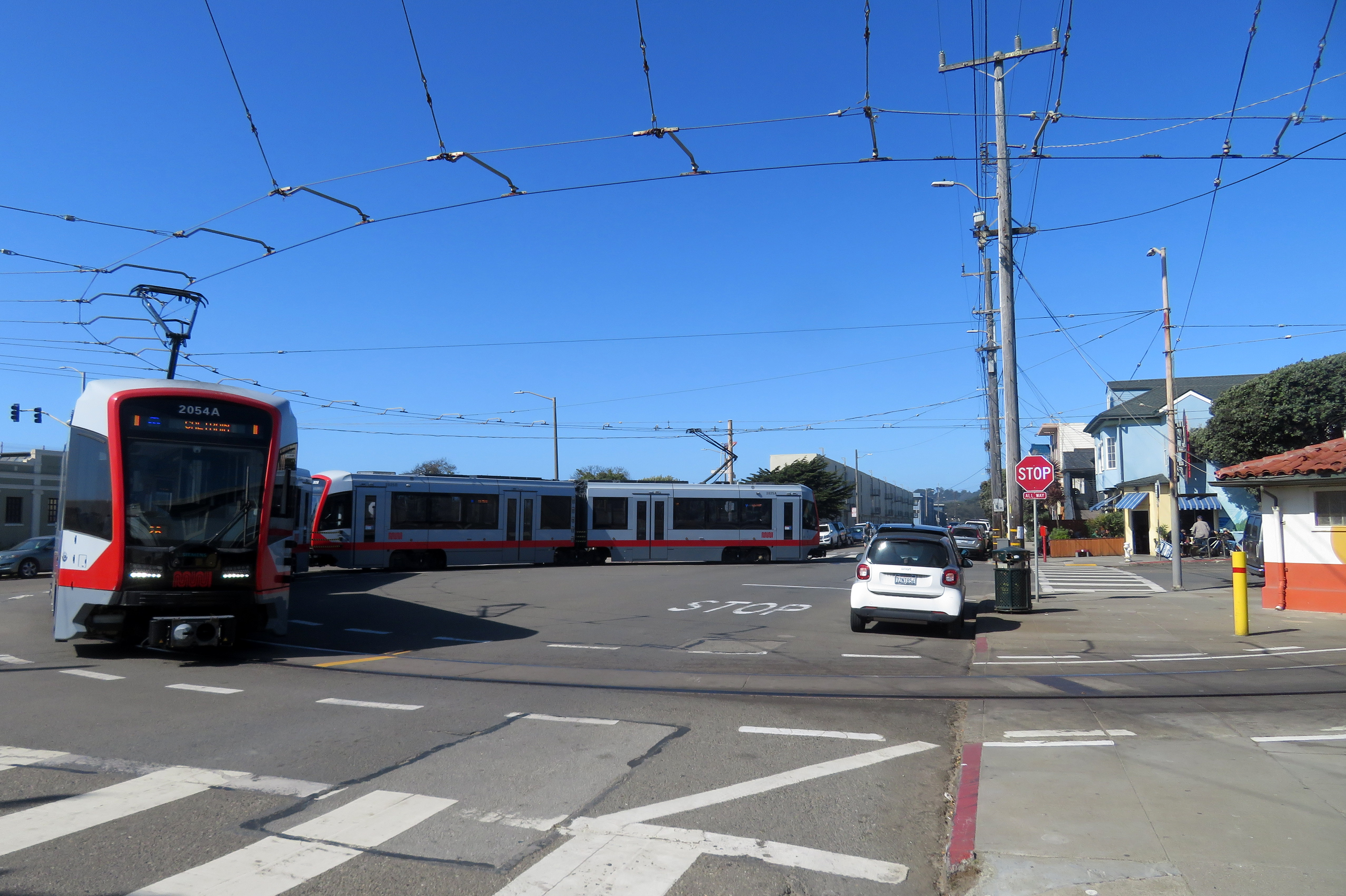
- A train at Judah and La Playa in September 2019

General information
- Other names: Ocean Beach
- Location: Judah Street at La Playa Street; San Francisco, California
- Coordinates: 37.76028°N 122.50913°W
- Platforms: 1 mini-high platform
- Tracks: 1 balloon loop

Construction
- Cycle facilities: Racks
- Accessible: Yes

History
- Opened: October 21, 1928

Services
| Preceding station | Muni | Following station |
|---|---|---|
| Terminus | N Judah | Judah and 46th Avenue toward 4th and King |
Location

Judah and La Playa station (often called Ocean Beach) is a light rail stop that serves as the western terminus of the Muni Metro N Judah line. It is located in the Sunset District neighborhood adjacent to the Great Highway and Ocean Beach. The station has functioned as the terminus of the N Judah line since October 21, 1928. The station has a mini-high platform for accessibility, but most passengers board trains from the street, crossing a lane of traffic to reach the sidewalks.

== Station layout ==
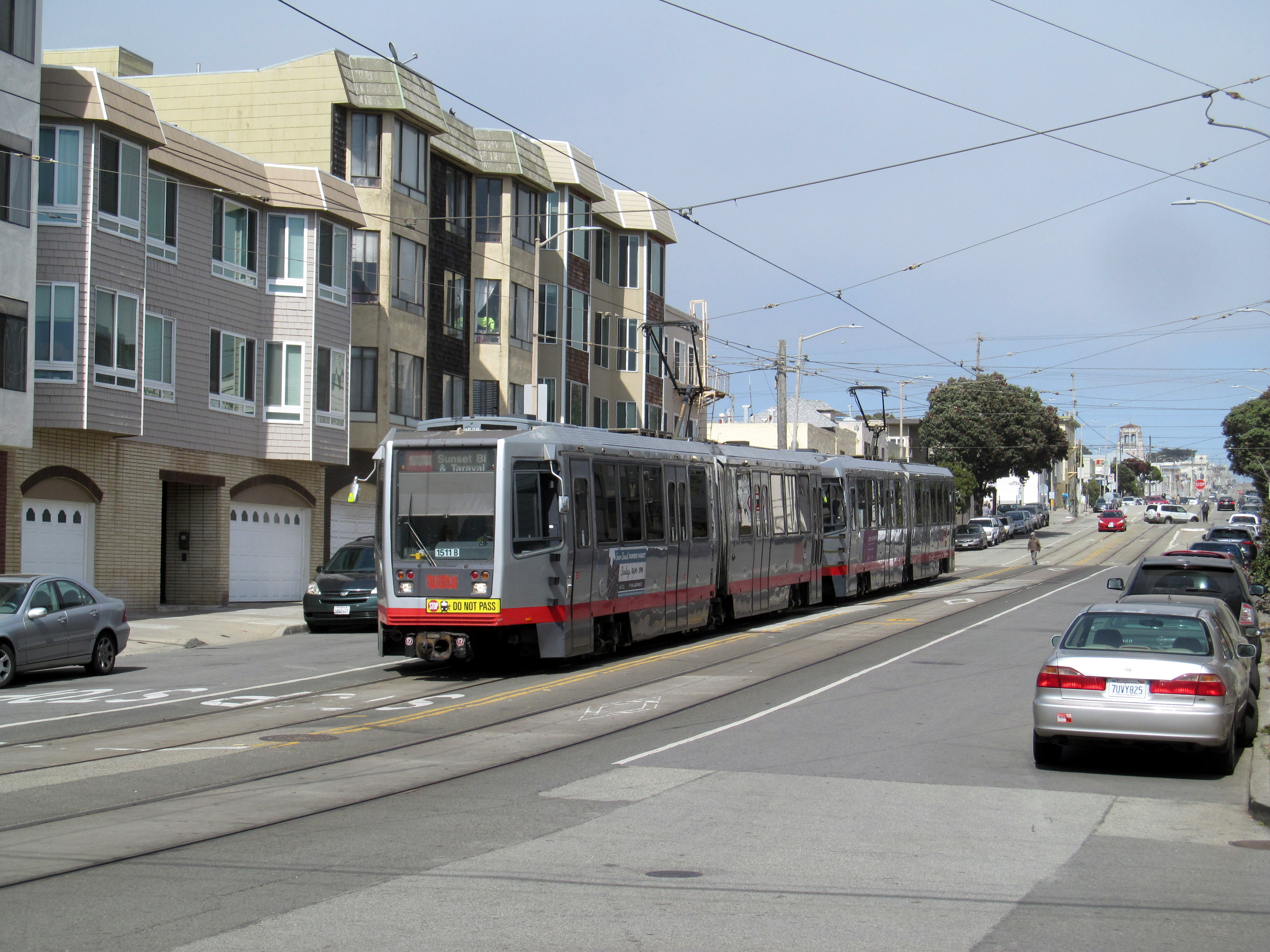
An outbound train arriving at the station

The station consists of a single-track balloon loop with a small accessible platform on its southern side. Passengers not needing the accessible platform board and alight from trains east of the loop between 48th Avenue and La Playa. A short siding, used to store and turn back trains, is located inside the loop and connects to the westbound track. When the loop is out of service, trains can turn back using a crossover between 48th Avenue and La Playa.

In March 2014, Muni released details of the proposed implementation of their Transit Effectiveness Project (later rebranded MuniForward), which included a variety of stop changes for the N Judah line. Under that plan, an inbound boarding island was to be built at 48th Avenue, and an outbound transit bulb was to be added at La Playa.

Trains normally lay over in the loop at the center of the intersection between Judah Street, La Playa Street, and Lower Great Highway. Stopped trains interfere with certain turns and block the southbound lane of La Playa Street. In November 2022, the California Public Utilities Commission (CPUC) notified the SFMTA that changes were needed to this practice, as "CPUC staff considers storing a 2 car consist in an active four-way intersection a hazardous condition". The CPUC cited a record of 13 collisions at the location between May 2019 and November 2022.

In 2023, the SFMTA developed plans for changes at the terminal location. These included prohibition of all turns to/from Lower Great Highway at the intersection, forced turns from La Playa, and parking changes on adjacent blocks. The SFMTA board approved the changes in January 2024, with initial construction expected to take place that March.
