= St. Francis Circle station =

Muni Metro light rail stop in San Francisco

St. Francis Circle
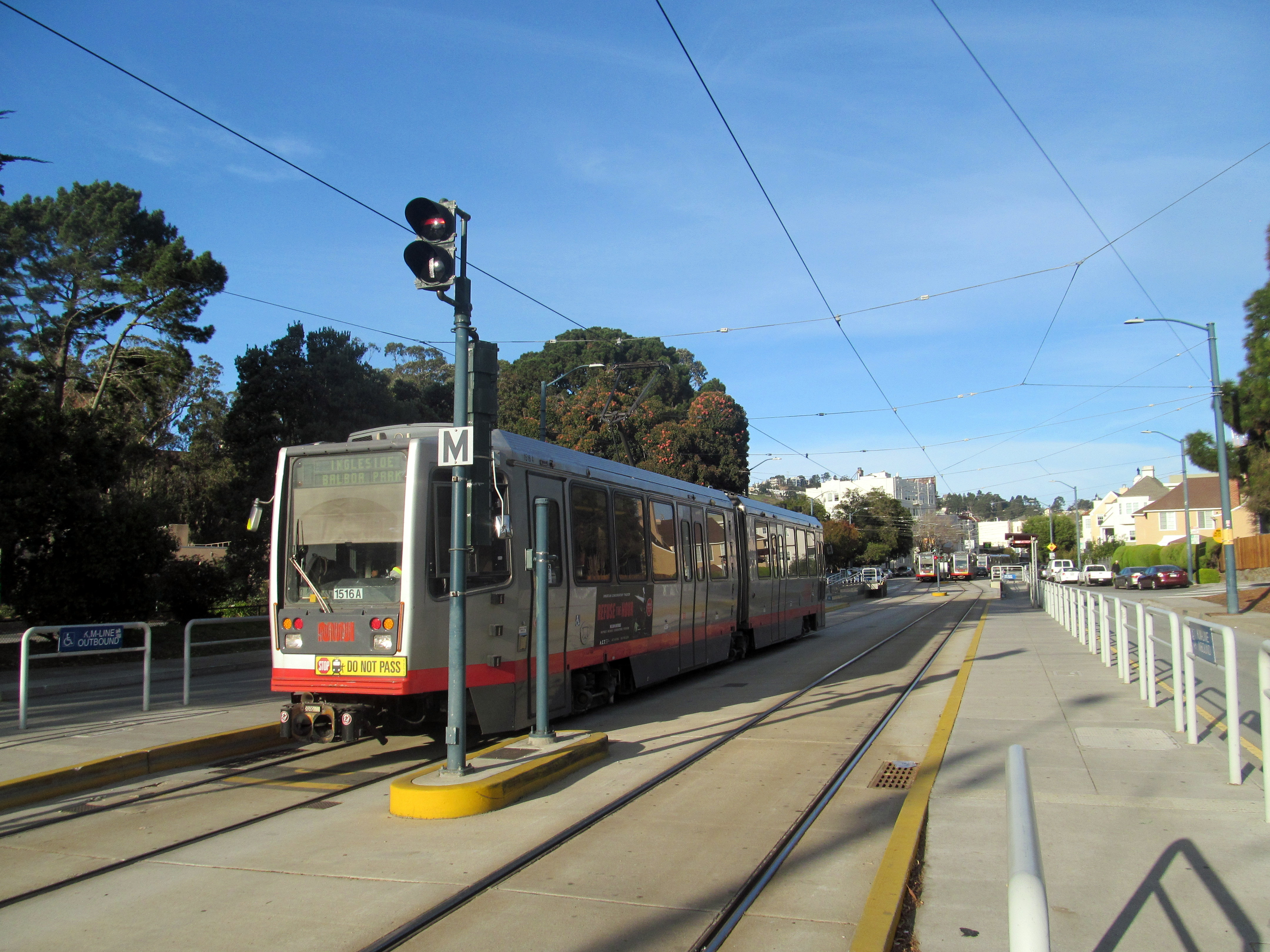
- An outbound train at the station in December 2017

General information
- Other names: West Portal Ave & Sloat Blvd
- Location: West Portal Avenue at Sloat Boulevard; San Francisco, California
- Coordinates: 37°44′05″N 122°28′12″W
- Platforms: 2 side platforms
- Tracks: 2
- Connections: Muni: 23, 57

Construction
- Accessible: Yes

History
- Opened: c. 1907

Services
Preceding station	Muni	Following station
Junipero Serra and Ocean toward Balboa Park	K Ingleside	West Portal and 14th Avenue toward Embarcadero
Right Of Way/Ocean toward San Jose and Geneva (Balboa Park)	M Ocean View	West Portal and 14th Avenue toward Embarcadero
Location

St. Francis Circle (signed as West Portal Ave & Sloat Blvd) is a light rail stop on the Muni Metro K Ingleside and M Ocean View lines, located in the St. Francis Wood neighborhood of San Francisco, California. It opened around 1907 when the United Railroads (URR) expanded its Ocean Avenue line west to Ocean Beach; Muni service followed with the K in 1918 and the M in 1925.

The stop is also served by the route 23, 57 buses, plus the K Bus and M Bus which provide service along the K Ingleside and M Ocean View lines during the early morning hours, along with the K Owl and 91 Owl which provide service along the K Ingleside line during the early morning and late night hours respectively when trains do not operate.

== History ==
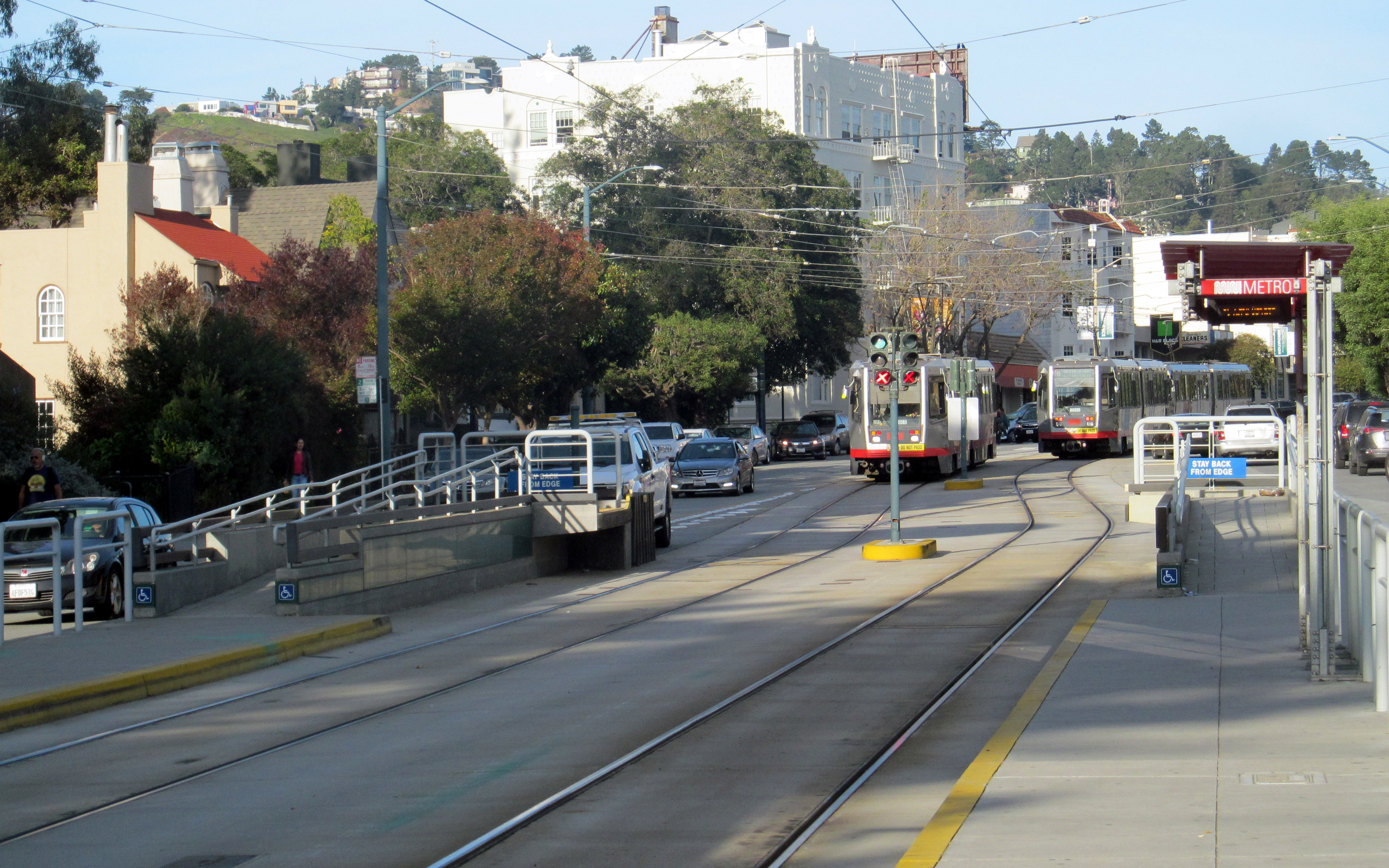
Mini-high platforms at the station provide accessibility.

The 1906 earthquake damaged many cable car and streetcar lines; in the aftermath, the United Railroads (URR) closed many cable cars lines and expanded the electric streetcar system. The URR resumed service on the Ocean Avenue (12) line on May 6, 1906; the line was soon extended to Ocean Beach via Junipero Serra Boulevard and Sloat Boulevard.

The city-owned Twin Peaks Tunnel was opened on February 3, 1918, with the K Ingleside line running through the tunnel and terminating at St. Francis Circle to avoid crossing the existing private tracks. In November 1918, the San Francisco Municipal Railway reached an agreement with the URR to allow the city's streetcars to use Market Street Railway trackage. The K Ingleside line was thus extended southwards from St. Francis Circle on Junipero Serra Boulevard and east on Ocean Avenue on February 21, 1919. M Ocean View service began on October 6, 1925; the new line split from the existing tracks in the circle and ran southwest on a private right-of-way. The city purchased the private company (renamed Market Street Railway in 1921) in 1944; route 12 streetcar service ended on April 8, 1945, leaving just the K Ingleside on Junipero Serra Boulevard.

In 2010, Muni replaced the rail junction just south of the station. Rail service south of West Portal station was replaced with buses from May 17 to September 4.
