= West Portal and 14th Avenue station =

Muni Metro light rail stop in San Francisco

West Portal and 14th Ave
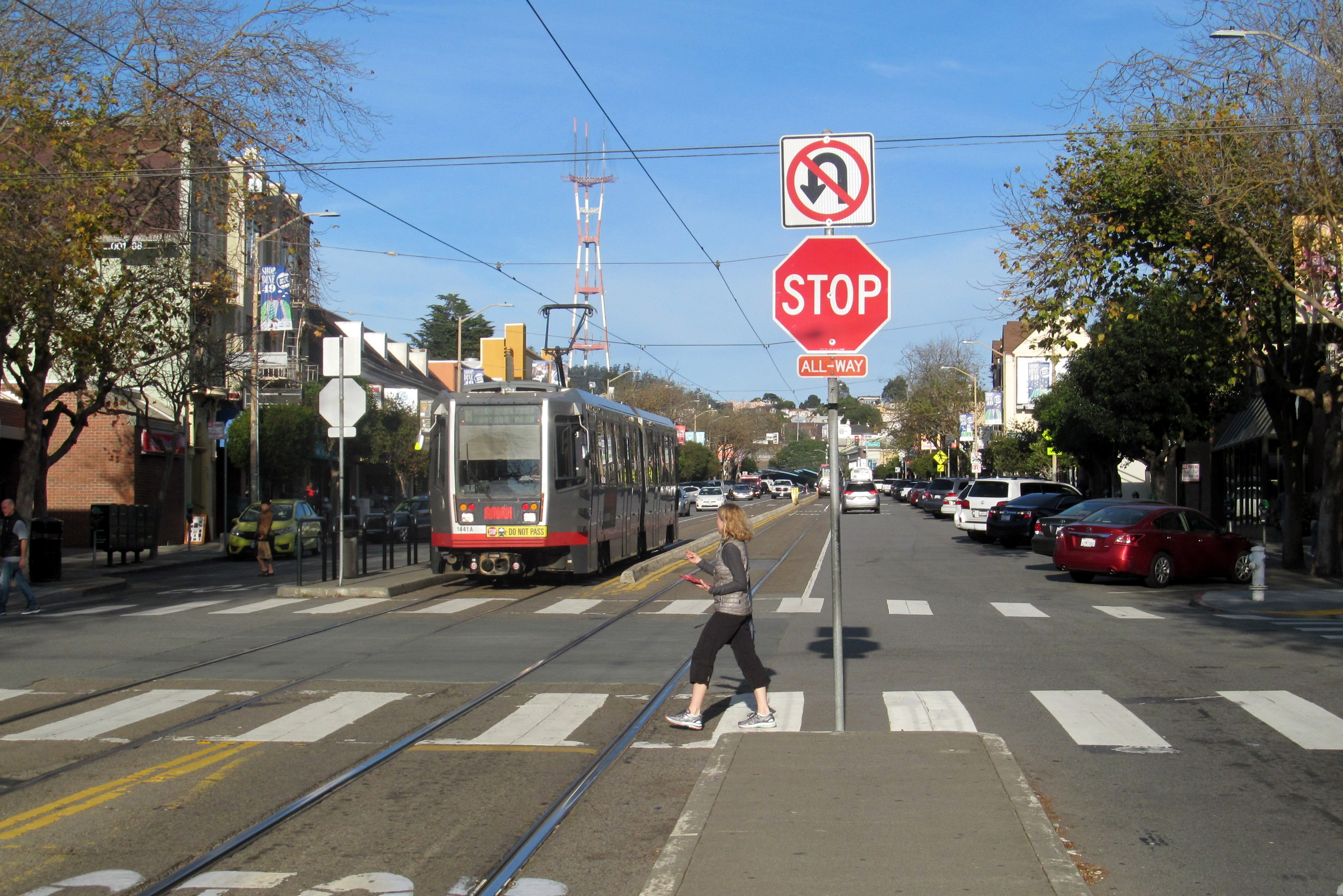
- Outbound train at West Portal and 14th in 2017

General information
- Location: West Portal Avenue at 14th Avenue; San Francisco, California
- Coordinates: 37°44′17″N 122°28′09″W
- Platforms: 2 side platforms
- Tracks: 2
- Connections: Muni: 57

Construction
- Accessible: No

History
- Opened: February 3, 1918

Services
Preceding station	Muni	Following station
St. Francis Circle toward Balboa Park	K Ingleside	West Portal toward Embarcadero
St. Francis Circle toward San Jose and Geneva (Balboa Park)	M Ocean View	West Portal toward Embarcadero
Location

West Portal and 14th Avenue is a light rail stop on the Muni Metro K Ingleside and M Ocean View lines, located in the West Portal neighborhood of San Francisco, California. The station opened along with the Twin Peaks Tunnel and the first stage of the K Ingleside line (to St. Francis Circle) on February 3, 1918.

The stop has two low-level side platforms (traffic islands) located before the cross street. It is the only non-accessible stop between St. Francis Circle to the west and the downtown stations to the east.

The stop is also served by the route 57 bus, plus the K Bus and M Bus which provide service along the K Ingleside and M Ocean View lines during the early morning hours, along with the K Owl and 91 Owl which provide service along the K Ingleside line during the early morning and late night hours respectively when trains do not operate.
