= West Portal station =

Light rail stop in San Francisco

West Portal
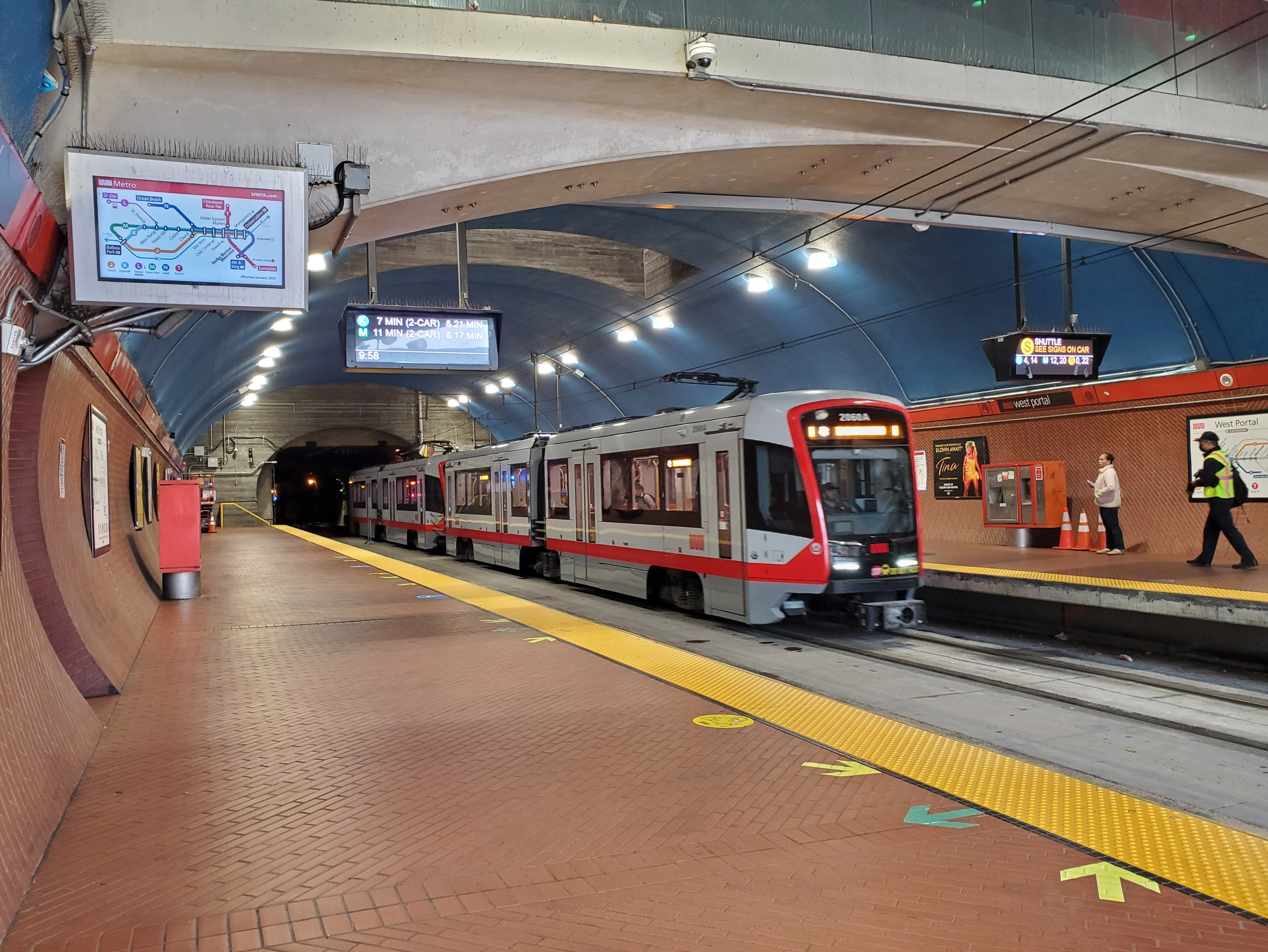
- An inbound train at West Portal station in August 2023

General information
- Location: West Portal Avenue at Ulloa Street; San Francisco, California
- Coordinates: 37°44′27.27″N 122°27′57.58″W
- Line: Twin Peaks Tunnel
- Platforms: 2 side platforms
- Tracks: 2
- Connections: Muni: 48, 57

Construction
- Accessible: Yes

History
- Opened: February 3, 1918
- Rebuilt: 1978–1980

Services
Preceding station	Muni	Following station
West Portal and 14th Avenue toward Balboa Park	K Ingleside	Forest Hill toward Embarcadero
Ulloa and 14th Avenue toward SF Zoo	L Taraval	Forest Hill toward Embarcadero
West Portal and 14th Avenue toward San Jose and Geneva (Balboa Park)	M Ocean View	Forest Hill toward Embarcadero
Terminus	S Shuttle	Forest Hill toward Embarcadero
Location

West Portal station is a Muni Metro station in the West Portal neighborhood in San Francisco, California. It is built around the western entrance to the Twin Peaks Tunnel. The station consists of two side platforms, with the entrance at the western end. A non-accessible footbridge connects the platforms inside fare control.

== History ==
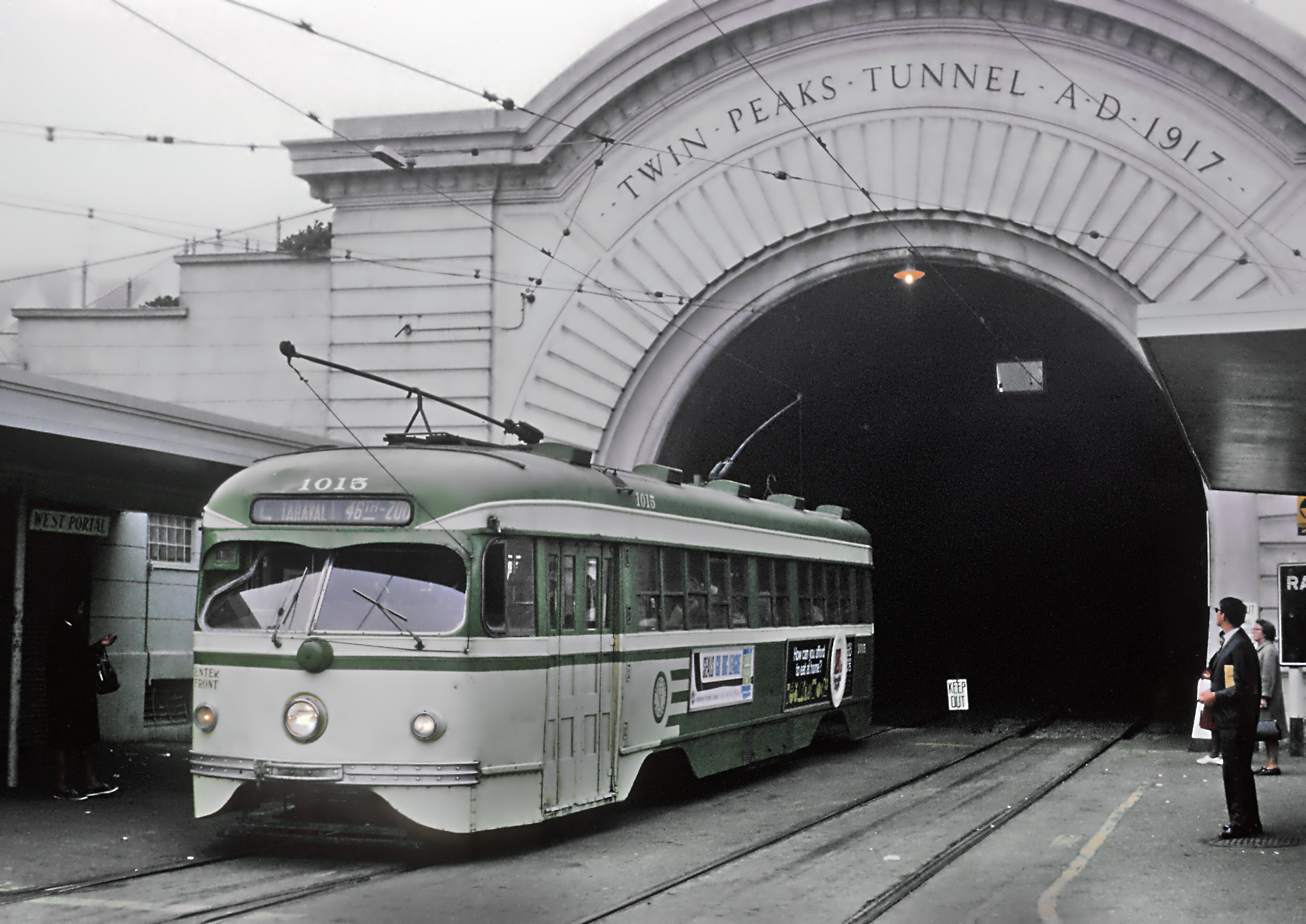
Former street-level stop outside Twin Peaks Tunnel in 1967

Opening in 1918, the station originally was similar to a regular curbside stop at the entrance to the tunnel. But when streetcar system was partially converted to light rail in the late 1970s, the existing underground metro station was built in its place. The BART Board approved the name "West Portal" in December 1965.

On July 18, 2009, the West Portal station was the scene of a collision between a K Ingleside train and a L Taraval train. An estimated 44 people were injured.

The station was temporarily closed from June 25 to August 24, 2018, during the Twin Peaks Tunnel shutdown. A crossover just east of West Portal station, installed during the shutdown, was named the Malcolm Heinicke Crossover after a former SFMTA board member in July 2020.

West Portal is a bottleneck for Muni Metro trains in all directions, as automobiles blocking train traffic momentarily can cause cascading delays. During the shutdown, new switches and a new control panel were installed to improve manual operation of the intersection. In 2019, parking control officers were assigned to direct traffic through the unsignaled intersection, which reduced delays by 40%.

As part of August 2020 changes to Muni Metro, the K and L were through-routed as an all-surface line, with frequent S Shuttle service between West Portal and Embarcadero. Mini-high platforms were constructed on Ulloa Street at West Portal to provide accessible transfer between the K/L and subway trains. The forced transfer at West Portal was criticized by disability advocates.

On March 16, 2024, a motorist in an SUV crashed into the L Taraval bus stop at the station, killing a family of four. In April 2024, the city announced plans for changes to the intersection including transit lanes and turn restrictions. On July 16, 2024, the SFMTA approved a modified package of changes that included fewer transit lanes and turn restrictions, as well as a redesign of the "horseshoe" area at the station entrance into a pedestrian plaza.
