= San Francisco Municipal Railway =

Public transport agency in San Francisco, California

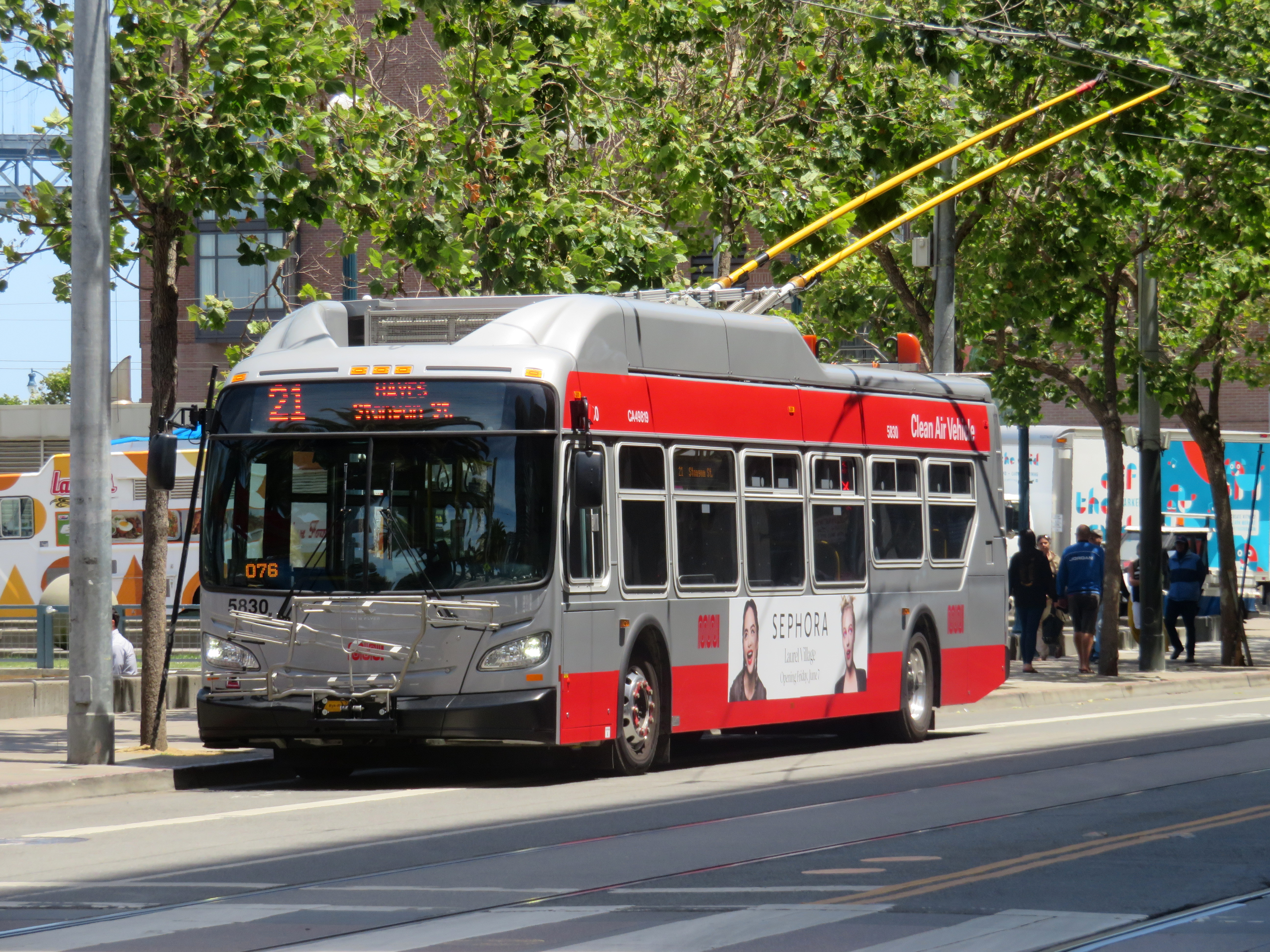
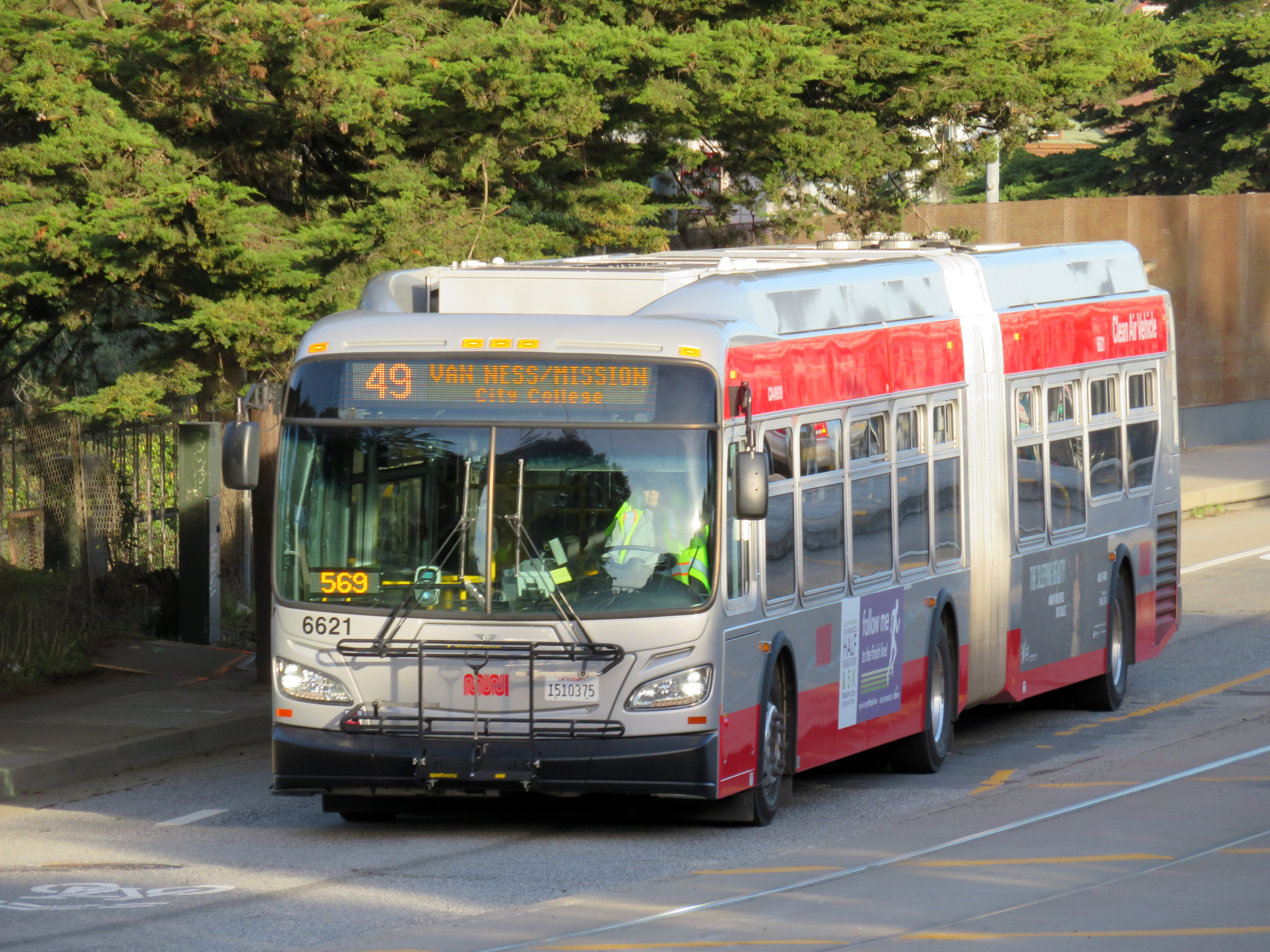
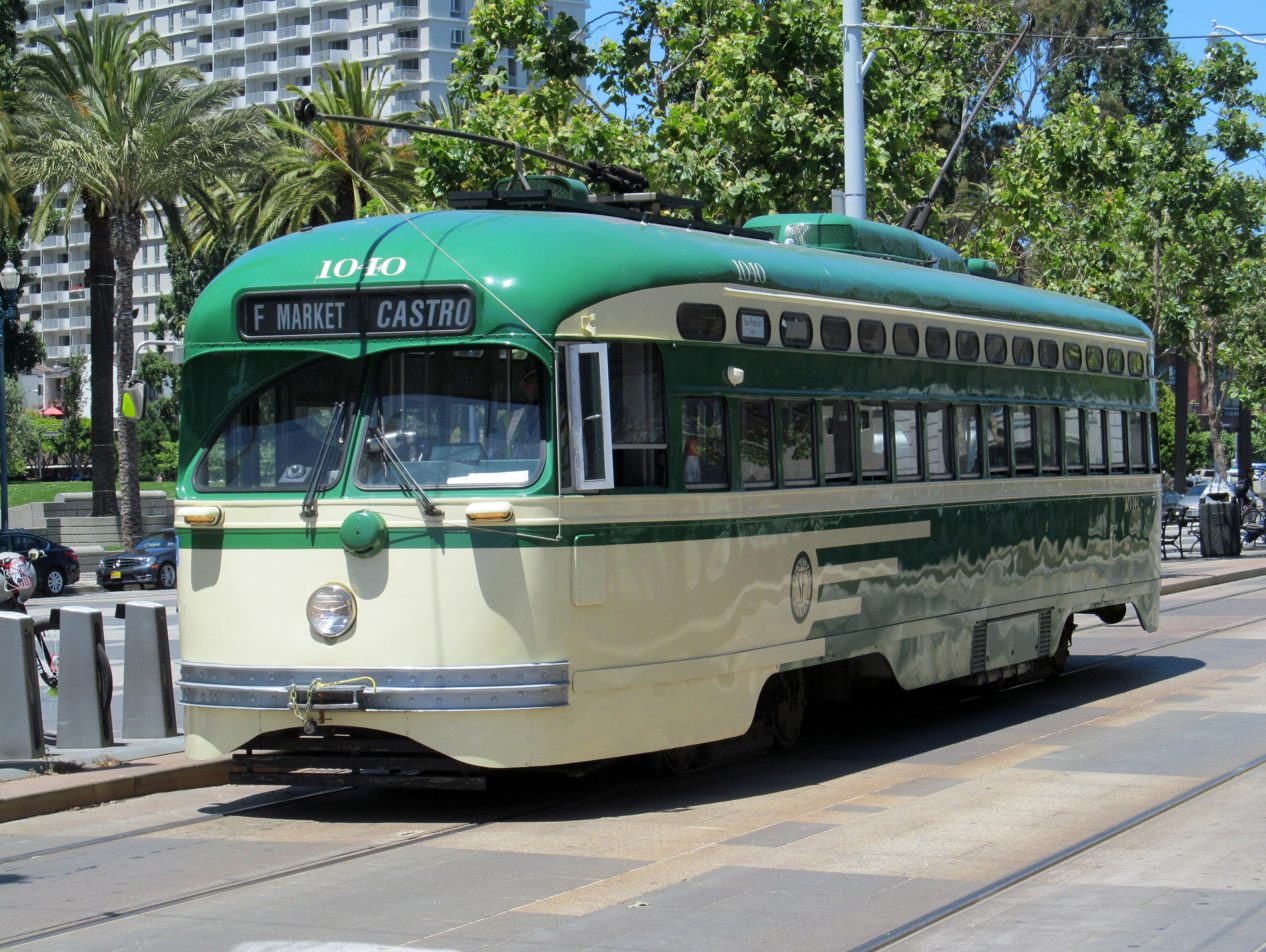
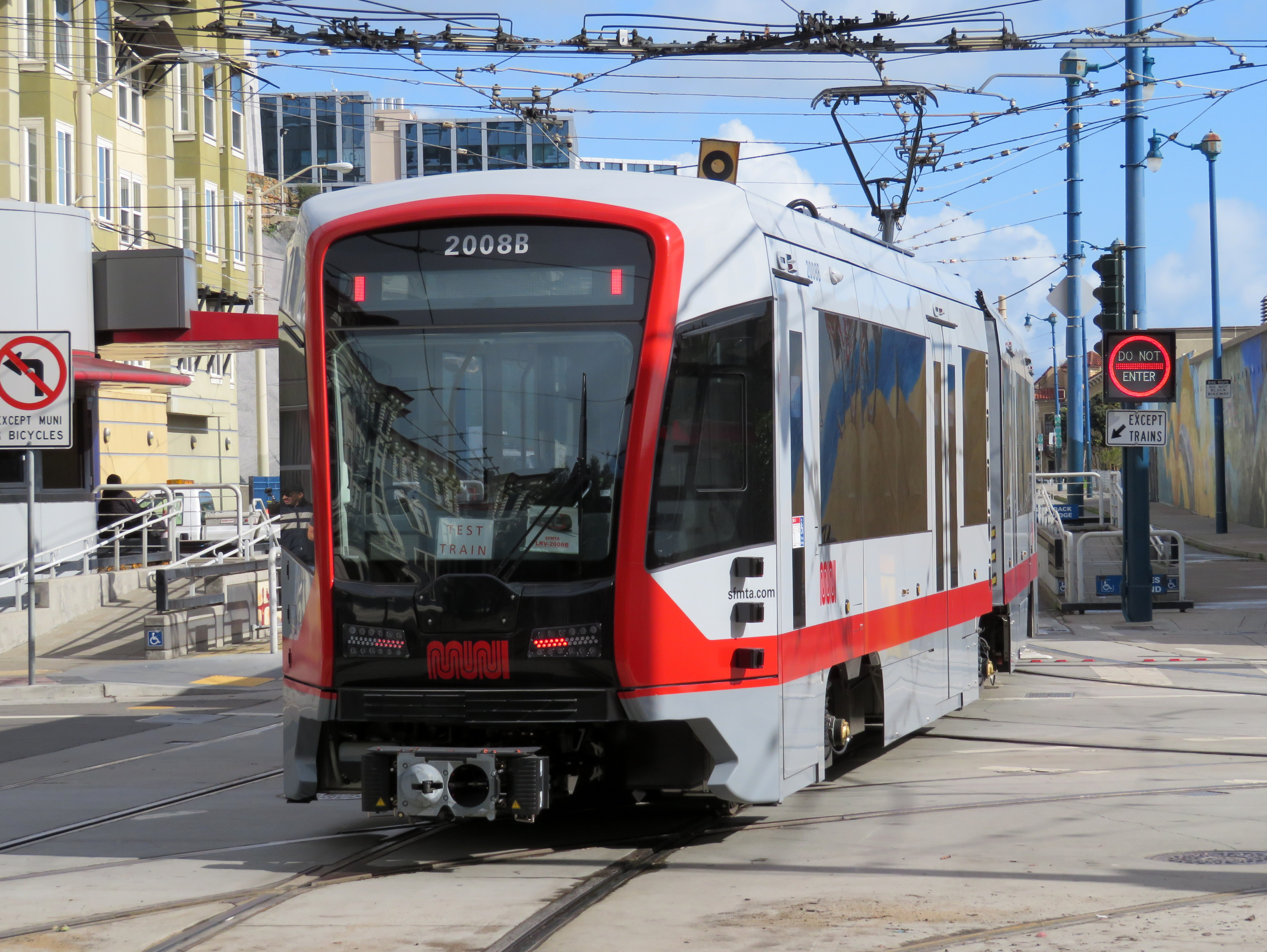
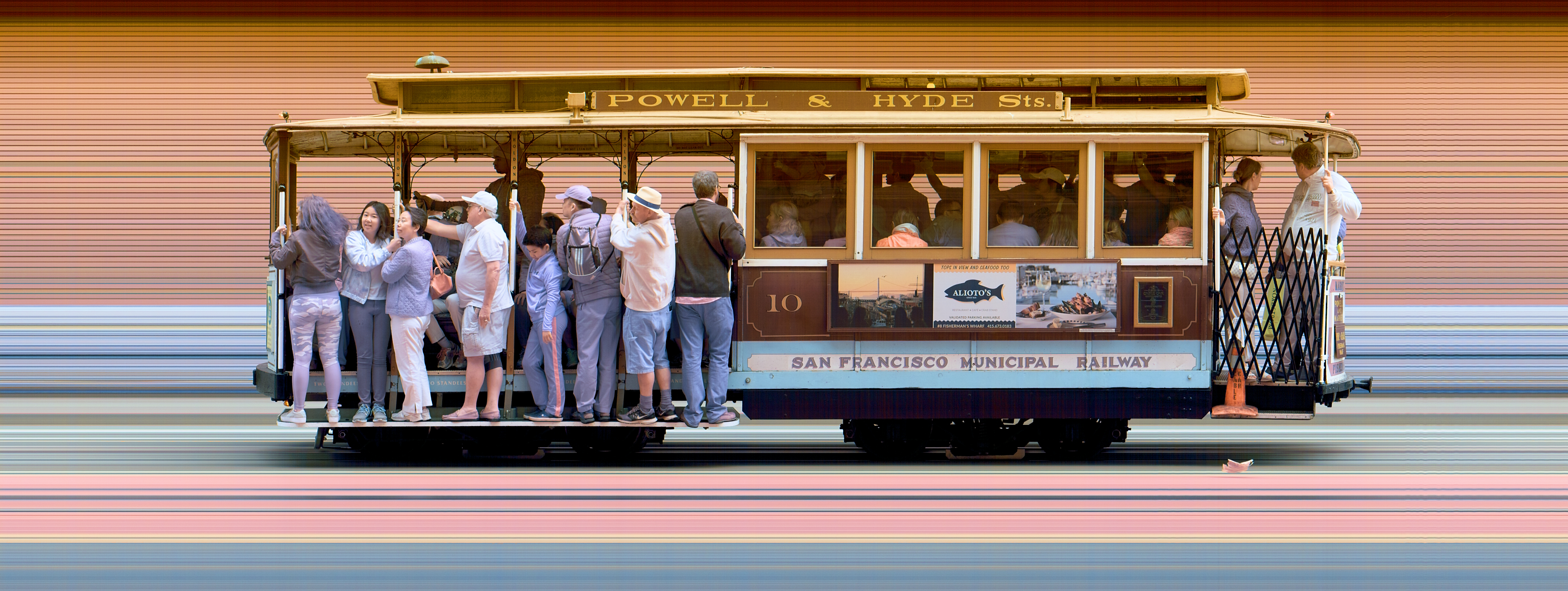
- Five Muni-operated types of service, clockwise from top left: trolleybus, bus, light rail, cable car and streetcar

Overview
- Owner: San Francisco Municipal Transportation Agency
- Locale: San Francisco
- Transit type: Bus, trolleybus, light rail, streetcar, cable car
- Number of lines: 83
- Daily ridership: 533,700 (weekdays, Q2 2026)
- Annual ridership: 167,087,000 (2025)
- Chief executive: Julie Kirschbaum (Director of Transportation, SFMTA)
- Website: sfmta.com

Operation
- Began operation: December 28, 1912; 113 years ago

Technical
- Track gauge: 4 ft 8 1/2 in (1,435 mm) standard gauge (light rail, streetcars); 3 ft 6 in (1,067 mm) (cable cars)
- Electrification: Overhead line, 600 V DC
- Average speed: 8.1 mph (13.0 km/h)

The San Francisco Municipal Railway (SF Muni or Muni /ˈmjuːni/ MEW-nee) is the primary public transit system within San Francisco, California. It operates a system of bus routes (including trolleybuses), the Muni Metro light rail system, three historic cable car lines, and a historic streetcar line. Previously an independent agency, the San Francisco Municipal Railway merged with two other agencies in 1999 to become the San Francisco Municipal Transportation Agency (SFMTA). In 2018, Muni served 46.7 square miles (121 km^{2}) with an operating budget of about $1.2 billion. Muni is the seventh highest-ridership transit system in the United States, with 167,087,000 rides in 2025, and the second highest in California after the Los Angeles County Metropolitan Transportation Authority.

== Operations ==
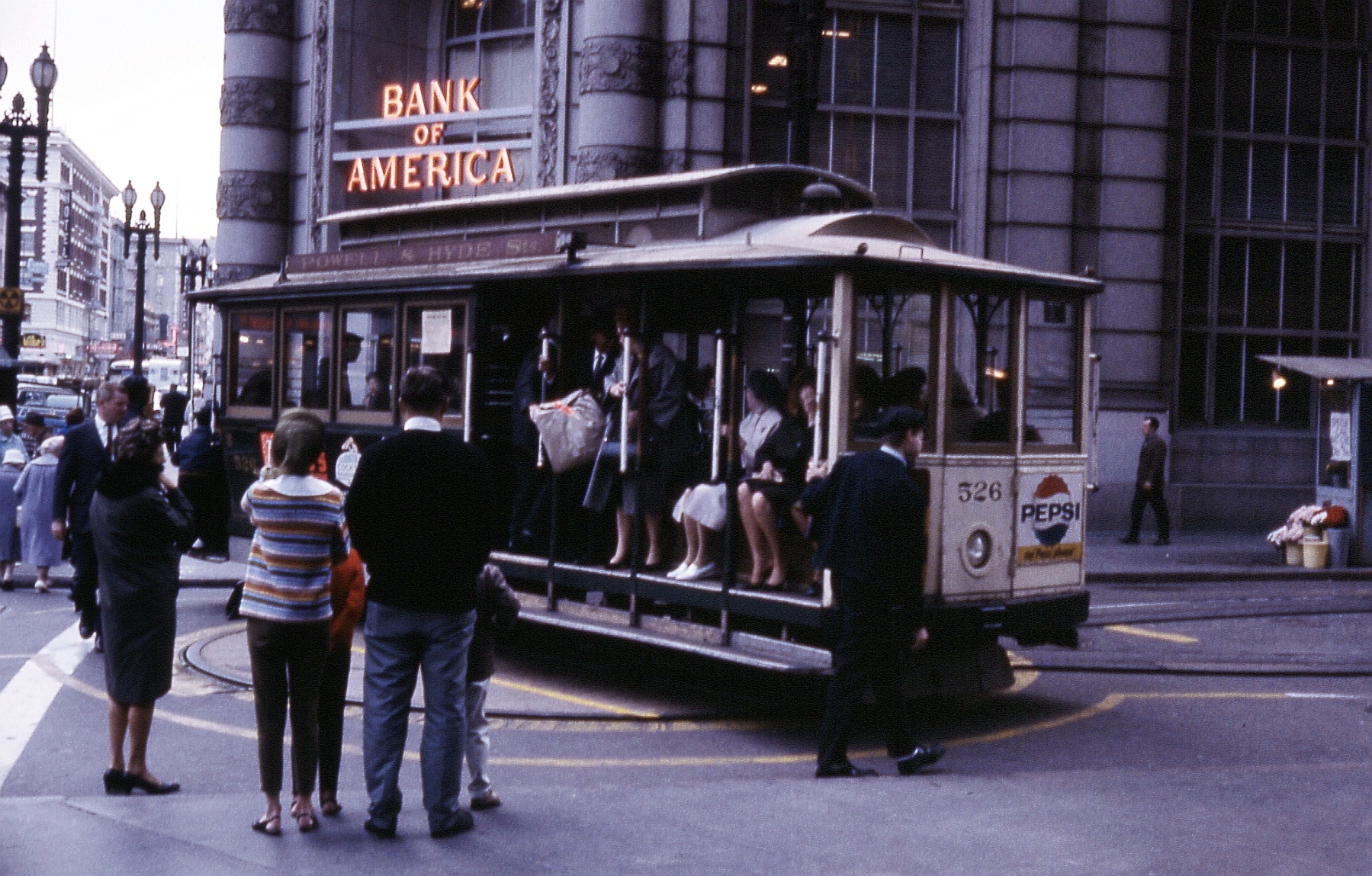
A cable car being turned around at the end of the line, August 1964

Most bus lines are scheduled to operate every five to fifteen minutes during peak hours, every five to twenty minutes middays, about every ten to twenty minutes from 9 pm to midnight, and roughly every half-hour for the late night "owl" routes. On weekends, most Muni bus lines are scheduled to run every ten to twenty minutes. However, complaints of unreliability, especially on less-often-served lines and older (pre-battery backup) trolleybus lines, are a system-wide problem. Muni has had some difficulty meeting a stated goal of 85% voter-demanded on-time service.

All Muni lines run inside San Francisco city limits, with the exception of several lines serving locations in the northern part of neighboring Daly City, and the 76X Marin Headlands Express line to the Marin Headlands area on weekends and major holidays. Most intercity connections are provided by BART and Caltrain heavy rail, AC Transit buses at the Salesforce Transit Center, and Golden Gate Transit and SamTrans downtown.

Bus and cable car stops throughout the city vary from Metro stations with raised platforms in the subway and at the more heavily used surface stops, to small shelters to signposts to simply a yellow stripe on a utility pole or on the road surface. 70% of stops are spaced closer than recommended range of 800–1,000 feet (240–300 m) apart.

=== Name and logo ===
The system is popularly known as "Muni", a shortening of the "Municipal" in "San Francisco Municipal Railway" (and not an acronym). Muni's logo is a stylized, trademarked "worm" version of the word muni. This logo was designed by San Francisco-based graphic designer Walter Landor in the mid-1970s.

=== Announcements ===
To cater to the large Hispanic and Latino American and Asian American populations in San Francisco, bus announcements are in four languages: English, Spanish, Cantonese and Tagalog.

== Route names ==
Bus and trolleybus lines are identified by a number and a route name that typically incorporates the street on which the route operates its longest segment, though it is occasionally a destination or landmark. For example, the 1-California line runs the majority of its route along California Street. Rail lines have letters as well as a name designation (J-Church, K-Ingleside, L-Taraval, M-Ocean View, N-Judah, T-Third), and the three cable car lines are typically referred to by name only (Powell-Mason, Powell-Hyde and California).

== Fares ==
Except for cable cars, cash fares are $3.00 for adults; $1.50 for seniors over 65, people with disabilities, and Medicare card holders; and free for low- and moderate-income seniors, youth aged 18 and under, and people with disabilities residing in San Francisco. Clipper card and MuniMobile fares are $2.85 for adults and $1.40 for seniors and people with disabilities. Proof-of-payment, which fare inspectors may demand at any time, is either a Clipper card, MuniMobile, Muni Passport, or paper transfer. One fare entitles a rider to unlimited vehicle transfers for the next 120 minutes. (Note: The entire travel time including all transfers must be completed within 120 minutes to qualify as one fare.) Cable cars are $9 one way, with no transfers, unless the rider has a Muni Passport or a Muni monthly pass. As of August 2025, monthly passes cost $86 for adults ($104 with BART privileges within city limits), $43 for low-income residents ("Lifeline Pass"), (Note: The Lifeline Pass price is set at 50% of the monthly pass price for a standard adult) or $43 for seniors and people with disabilities. Passes are valid on all Muni lines—including cable cars—and the $104 adult pass allows BART transit entirely within San Francisco (between Embarcadero and Balboa Park). Other passes and stickers are valid on all Muni lines, including cable cars, but not on BART (with the exception of BART-Plus ticket types).

Cable car fare is $9 per trip, with no transfers issued or accepted. "Passports" are folding scratch-off passes that can be purchased by mail, or at various places throughout the city; they are good on all regular-service lines without surcharge, including cable cars. As of August 2025, Passports cost $15 for a 1-day pass, $35 for a 3-day pass, or $47 for a 7-day pass.

Muni has implemented a dual-mode smart card payment system known as Clipper (formerly TransLink). The transponders have been in use since at least 2004, and replaced most paper monthly passes in 2010. BART, Caltrain, Golden Gate Transit, VTA, AC Transit, SamTrans, SMART and San Francisco Bay Ferry also utilize the Clipper system.

Fares can also be paid with a mobile app called MuniMobile since 2015. The app is developed by moovel, who have built mobile ticketing apps for a number of other transit agencies such as Caltrain and TriMet. The app is planned to be deployed until around 2021 when the next generation Clipper card mobile app is planned to launch and replace agency-specific ticketing apps.

Fare evolution
| Year | Single ride | Adult monthly pass | Cable car fare |
|---|---|---|---|
| 2025 | $3, $2.85 with Clipper | $104 with BART access, $86 without BART access | $9 |
| 2025 | $3, $2.75 with Clipper | $102 with BART access, $85 without BART access | $8 |
| 2020 | $3, $2.50 with Clipper | $98 with BART access, $81 without BART access | $8 |
| 2019 | $2.75 increases to $3, $2.50 with Clipper | $94 increases to $98 with BART access, $78 increases to $81 without BART access | $7 |
| 2018 | $2.75 | $94 with BART access, $78 without BART access | $7 |
| 2017 | $2.50 increases to $2.75 | $94 with BART access, $75 without BART access | $7 |
| 2017 | $2.25 increases to $2.50 | $91 with BART access, $73 without BART access | $7 |
| 2016 | $2.25 | $86 with BART access, $73 without BART access | $7 |
| 2015 | $2.25 | $83 with BART access, $70 without BART access | $6 increases to $7 |
| 2014 | $2 increases to $2.25 | $80 with BART access, $68 without BART access | $6 |
| 2012 | $2 | $74 with BART access, $64 without BART access | $6 |
| 2011 | $2 | $72 with BART access, $62 without BART access | $5 increases to $6 |
| 2010 | Usually $2, occasionally $2.25 for a single-use Clipper Card | $70 with BART access, $60 without BART access | $5 |
| 2009 | $2 | $55 | $5 |
| 2008 | $1.50 | $45 | $5 |
| 2006 | $1.50 | $45 | $5 |
| 2005 | $1.25 increases to $1.50 | $45 | $5 |
| 2003 | $1 increases to $1.25 | $45 | $3 increases to $5 |
| 2002 | $1 | $35 | $2 |
| 1999 | $1 | $35 | $2 |
| 1998 | $1 | $35 | $2 |
| 1993 | $1 | $35/$45 | $2 each way |
| 1992 | $0.85 increases to $1.00 | $32 | $3 round-trip |
| 1991 | $0.85 | $30 | $2 |
| 1988 | $0.75 increases to $0.85 | $28 | $2 or $2.50 |
| 1987 | $0.75 | $25 | $1.50 |
| 1986 | $0.60 increases to $0.75 | $23 | $1 increases to $1.50 |
| 1985 | $0.60 | $24 | $1 |
| 1984 | $0.60 | $20 | $1 |
| 1982 | $0.50 increases to $0.60 | $16 increases to $24 | $1 |
| 1981 | $0.50 | $16 | $0.50 |
| 1980 | $0.25 increases to $0.50 | $16 | $0.25 |
| 1979 | $0.25 | $11 | $0.30 |
| 1976 | $0.25 | $11 | $0.25 |
| 1975 | $0.25 | $11 | $0.25 |
| 1974 | $0.25 | Monthly passes introduced at $11 | $0.25 |
| 1970 | $0.20 increases to $0.25 | | $0.25 |
| 1969 | $0.15 increases to $0.20 | | $0.25 |
| 1961 | $0.15 | | $0.05 |
| 1952 | $0.10 increases to $0.15 or $0.10 | | $0.05 or $0.10 |
| 1951 | $0.10 | | $0.05 |
| 1950 | $0.10 | | $0.05 |
| 1949 | $0.10 | | $0.05 |
| 1947 | $0.10 per ride, or $0.25 for three tokens | | $0.05 |
| 1946 | $0.07 increases to $0.10 | | $0.05 or $0.07 |
| 1945 | $0.07 | | $0.05 or $0.07 |
| 1944 | $0.05 increases to $0.07 | | $0.05 or $0.07 |
| 1937 | $0.05 | | $0.05 |
| 1932 | $0.05 | | $0.05 |
| 1912 | $0.05 (equivalent to $1.67 in 2025) | | $0.05 |

== Special services ==
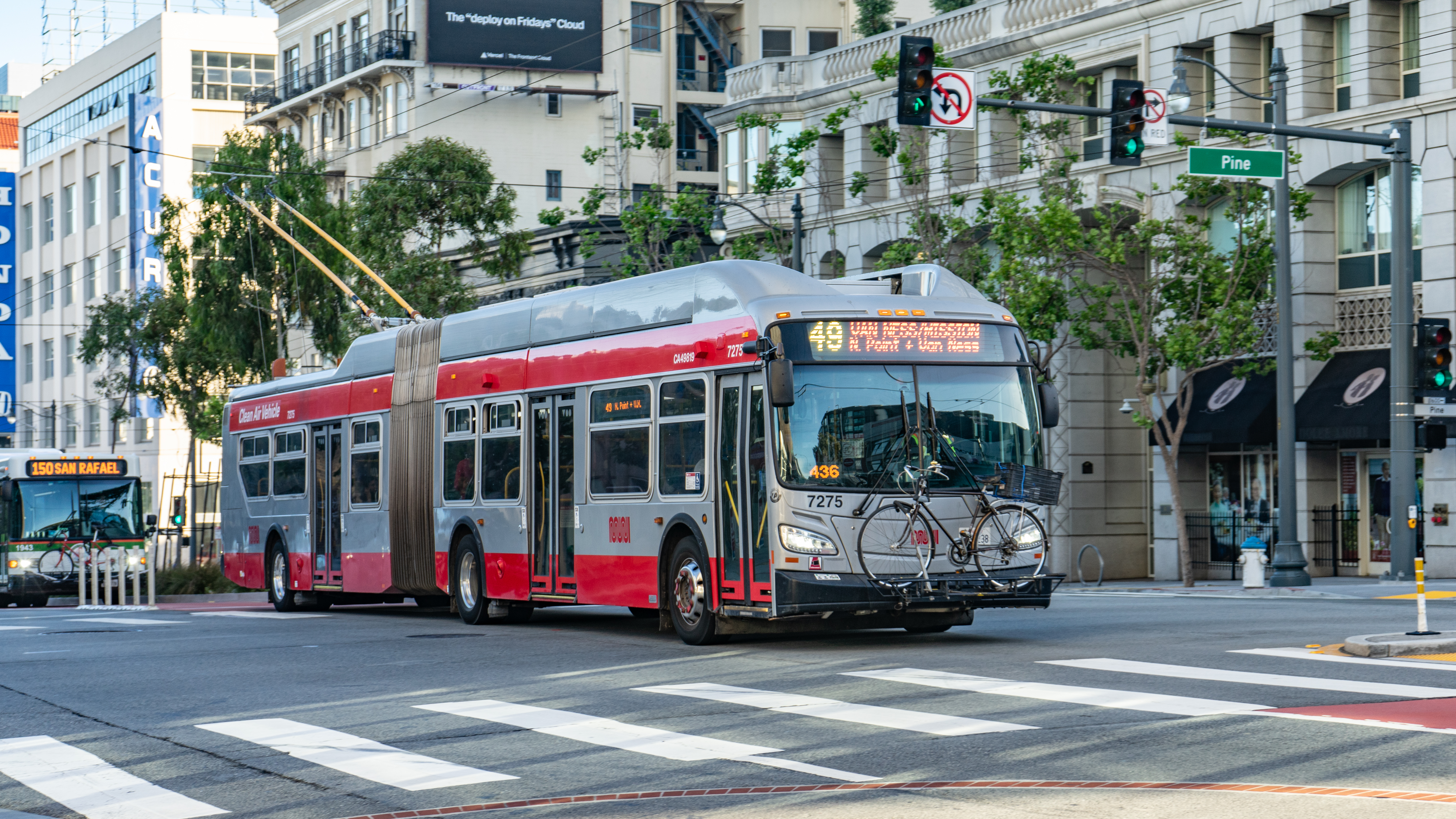
A trolleybus on the 49 Van Ness/Mission line in 2024

Muni operates 14 express lines, 5 Rapid lines, and 12 Owl lines, which run between 1 am and 5 am. For San Francisco Giants games, additional "baseball shuttles" supplement N Judah and T Third service to Oracle Park.

Express lines only run during peak hours; during mornings they run towards downtown (the Financial District) and during the evening they run away from downtown. All express lines have an "X", "AX", or "BX" following the line's number. Some lines are divided into A and B Expresses. The B Express line is shorter and has stops that are closer to downtown, while the A Express makes stops further away from downtown and will make few or no stops in the area where the B Express stops. The 8 Bayshore, as the 8X Bayshore Express, was the only Express route that ran daily until April 25, 2015, the date when it was no longer an Express route.

Rapid lines (having an R following their route number) are limited-stop services. They stop at only a subset of the stops of their corresponding "standard" line‍—‌typically every third stop and at transfer points.

=== Cable car system ===
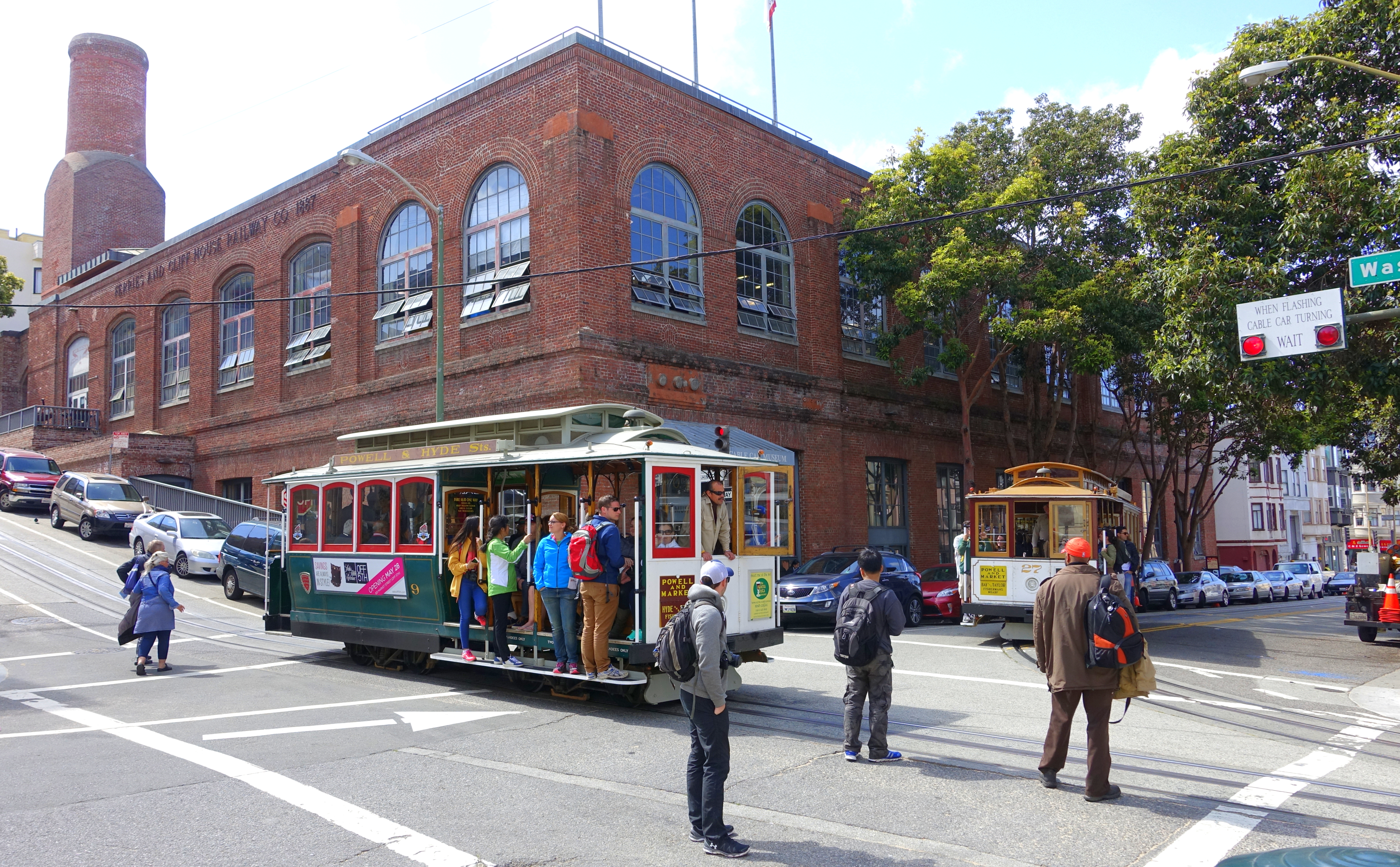
Cable cars in front of the San Francisco Cable Car Museum in 2015

Muni also operates the San Francisco cable car system, a heritage streetcar system descendant of a larger network of manually operated cable cars. The first city-owned line was acquired in 1906, although the current configuration is an amalgamation of several former lines and has operated as such since in 1952. The system was designated a National Historic Landmark in 1964 and placed on the National Register of Historic Places in 1966. There are three cable car lines being the Mason-Powell line, the California State line, and the Powell- Hyde line. Popular areas from the Embarcadero to Fisherman's Wharf are served by cable cars. In the system, there are 62 allocated stations. The system accrues five million annual riders and has always been a tourist destination as well as a convenient means for travel around the city.

=== Heritage streetcars ===
Additionally, Muni operates two heritage streetcar lines distinct from the Muni Metro: the E Embarcadero and F Market & Wharves, however the former has been suspended since April 2020 due to the COVID-19 pandemic. Formerly run for the Historic Trolley Festival, in the 1980s, regular service of heritage equipment began in 1995. Streetcars do not utilize tunnel segments and the F line utilizes infrastructure optimized for trolleybuses along Market Street (the former routing of all downtown streetcar lines before the formation of Muni Metro).

== Statistics ==
The longest Muni line is the 24.1-mile (38.8 km) 91 Owl a nighttime-only route that blends several other routes together, while the longest daytime route is the 17.4-mile (28.0 km) 29. The shortest route is the peak-hour only 88 BART Shuttle at 1.4 miles (2.3 km), while the shortest off-peak route is the 39 Coit at 1.6 miles (2.6 km). The steepest grade climbed by Muni vehicle is 23.1% by a diesel-electric hybrid bus on the 67 line, 22.8% by a trolleybus on the 24 line and 21% by a cable car on the Powell-Hyde line.

The busiest Muni bus corridor is the Geary corridor. The two major routes that operate on the corridor, the 38 and 38R, travel 6.5 miles (10.5 km) in the east–west direction along the Geary corridor, and has an average speed of only 8 miles per hour (13 km/h), taking over 50 minutes to travel from the Richmond District to the Transbay Terminal when operating on schedule. As of 2015, the corridor has a total of 55,270 average daily boardings, making it the second busiest transit corridor west of the Mississippi after the Los Angeles Metro Wilshire transit corridor.

At Powell and Market Streets and California and Market Streets, three types of rail gauges come within a few hundred feet of each other: Bay Area Rapid Transit's 5 ft 6 in (1,676 mm) broad gauge (which is underground in the lower level of the Market Street subway), Muni Metro's 4 ft 8 1/2 in (1,435 mm) standard gauge (also underground in the upper level of the subway), and the San Francisco cable car system's 3 ft 6 in (1,067 mm) narrow gauge (at street level a few hundred feet away to the north of Market Street in both cases). The F Market and Wharves, a heritage streetcar line, which is also standard gauge, is also present here, at street level on Market Street. The rail lines, however, do not physically intersect.

=== Fleet ===
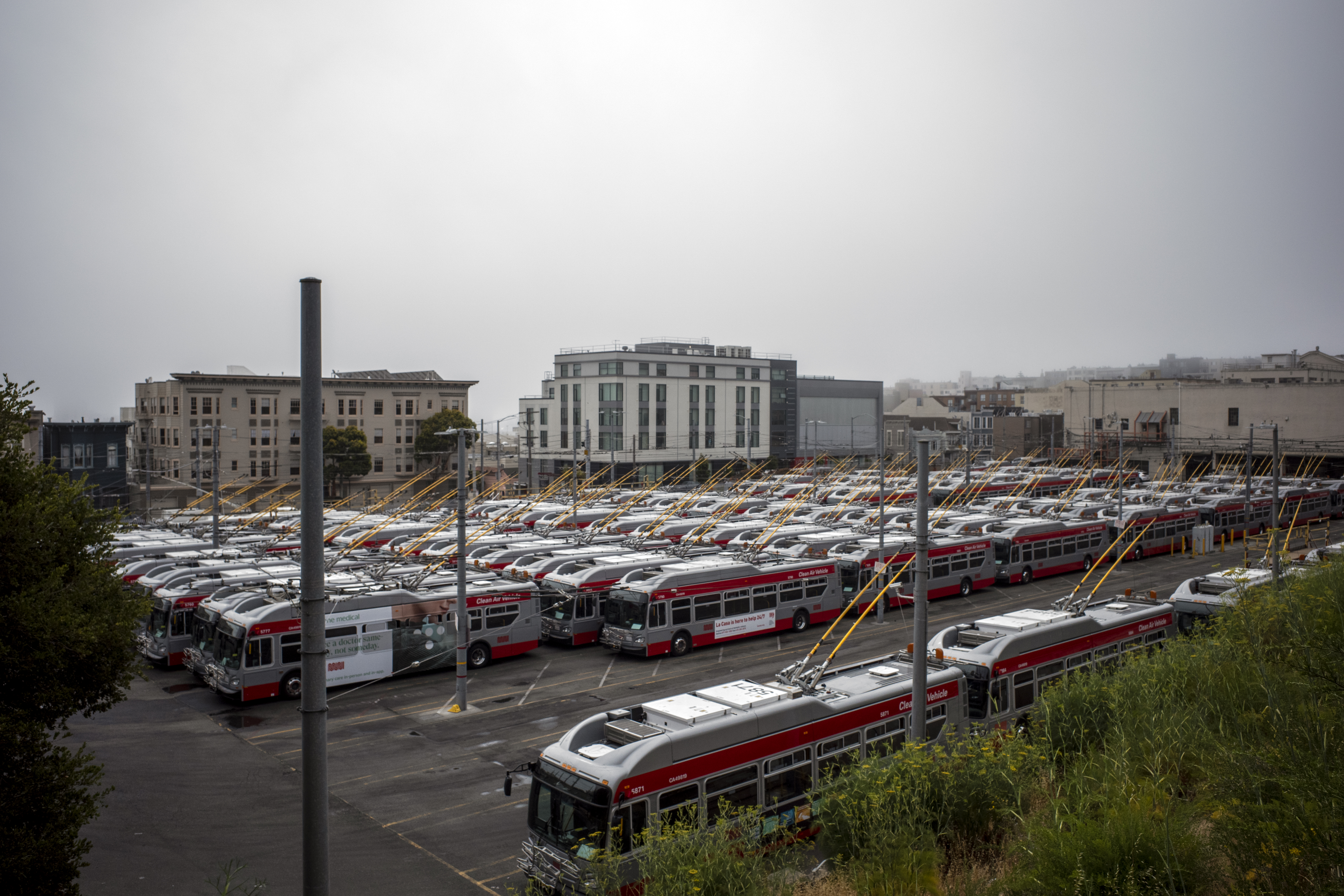
Trolleybuses parked in the Presidio division, 2020

Muni operates about 1,200 vehicles: 550 diesel-electric hybrid buses, 300 electric trolleybuses, 250 modern light rail vehicles, 50 historic streetcars and 40 cable cars. All vehicles, except for cable cars, are wheelchair accessible.

The electricity to run all of Muni's trolleybuses, light rail vehicles, streetcars, and the cable car powerhouse comes from the hydroelectric dam at the Hetch Hetchy Reservoir in Yosemite National Park.

All of Muni's current internal combustion buses use diesel-electric hybrid powertrains, fueled with renewable diesel fuel made from bio-feedstock sources, including fats, oils and greases. The combination of hybrid technology and renewable diesel fuel helps reduce fuel consumption and cut vehicle emissions.

=== Performance ===
Weekday mode share on Muni services in 2019
1. Muni Metro (23.4%)
2. Bus (49.6%)
3. Trolley bus (24.8%)
4. Cable Car (2.20%)

In November 1999 San Francisco voters passed Proposition E setting standards for performance of having at least an 85% on-time record In July 2012 Muni vehicles were on-time 60% of the time and in August 2012, they were on-time 57% of the time. A report conducted by the San Francisco Municipal Transport Agency in early 2013 noted that Muni was on time only 58% of the time. It delayed its customers a total of 172,195 hours and reduced the city's economic activity by US$50 million per year. In 2013 the performance hit an all-time low of 57%, the on-time performance improved to 60% in January 2014, 60% in February 2014, and 60% in March 2014.

Muni Metro on-time performance as of June 2022:

| Line | On-time trains | Late or very late trains |
|---|---|---|
| L Taraval | N/A | N/A |
| N Judah | 61.7% | 25.2% |
| / | 51.3% | 36.8% |
| J Church | 64.5% | 28.6% |
| M Ocean View | 58.3% | 27.8% |
| All Lines | 57.7% | 29.7% |

== Governance ==
Since the passage of Proposition E in November 1999, Muni has been part of the San Francisco Municipal Transportation Agency (SFMTA), a semi-independent city agency created by that ballot measure. The agency, into which Muni, the Department of Parking and Traffic, and the Taxicab Commission were merged, is governed by a seven-member Board of Directors appointed by the Mayor and confirmed by the Board of Supervisors. The acting Director of Transportation of the SFMTA since August 15, 2019 has been Thomas Maguire, appointed by the SFMTA Board as the interim replacement for Director of Transportation Edward Reiskin. On April 29, 2019, Director Reiskin announced that he would step down at the end of his contract in August 2019. On November 13, 2019, the agency announced that Jeffrey Tumlin would take over as the new director on December 16, 2019.

The day-to-day operations of Muni are overseen by the Transit division of the SFMTA, which is currently headed by Director of Transit Julie Kirschbaum.

== History ==
=== Early years ===
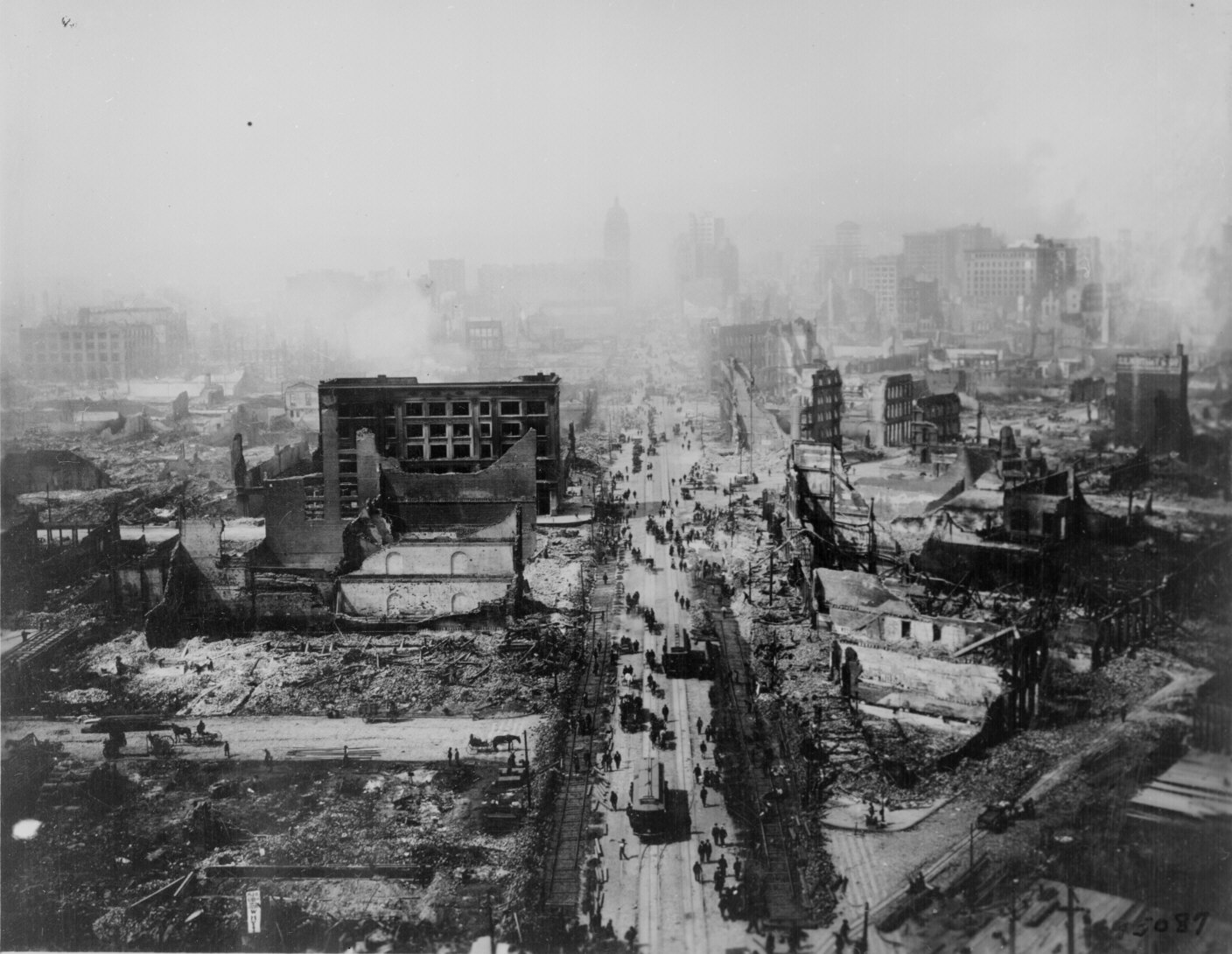
As seen in this view from the Ferry Building, looking west along Market Street, streetcars resumed operation soon after the 1906 earthquake and fire.

Muni has its origins in the period following the 1906 San Francisco earthquake. Until then the city had been served by several commercial horsecar, cable car and electric streetcar operators. Many of these had been amalgamated into the United Railroads of San Francisco (URR) company. In 1909, voters approved a municipal rail line down Geary. Three years later in 1912, the city declined to renew the franchise that bestowed cable car operator Geary Street, Park & Ocean Railway the privilege of operating on Geary Street. The route was converted into a municipal electric streetcar line, the first line of Muni. (In 1912, the average speed of the city's public transit was approximately 8.5 miles per hour – slightly faster than the average speed of 8.1 in 2007.)

Muni soon started on a large building program. On December 29, 1914, the new Stockton Street Tunnel under Nob Hill opened, allowing streetcars from downtown to go to North Beach. The new line also served the Marina District, the site of the 1915 Panama-Pacific International Exposition.

On February 3, 1918, the Twin Peaks Tunnel opened, making the southwestern quarter of the city available for development. On October 21, 1928, the Sunset Tunnel opened, bringing the N Judah streetcar line to the Sunset District. These improvements plunged Muni into direct competition with the URR on the entire length of Market Street. The two operators each operated their own pair of tracks down that thoroughfare, which came to be known as the "roar of the four".

=== 1940s: The first trolleybuses ===
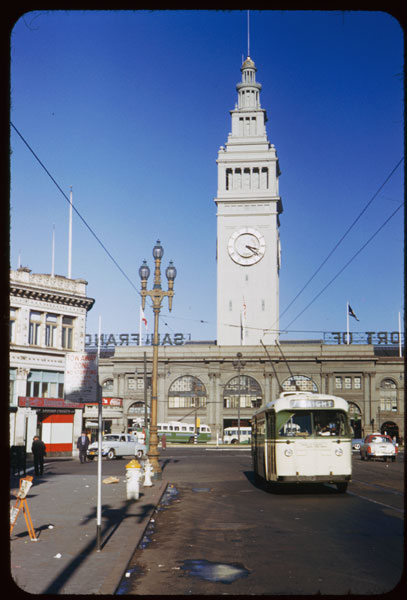
Trolleybus operating 7-Haight route near the Ferry Building (1953)

In 1941, Muni introduced its first trolleybus line, the R-Howard line. Trolleybuses had been running in San Francisco since 1935 but operated only by the Market Street Railway Company (MSRy), successor to the URR. By 1944, the MSR was in financial difficulties. Thus, at 5 am on September 29, 1944, Muni acquired its commercial competitor. Along with the routes and equipment, Muni adopted its competitor's more expensive seven-cent fare. Following national trends, Muni replaced most of its rail lines with trolleybus service in the succeeding decades. A few lines with dedicated rights-of-way (including those serving the Twin Peaks and Sunset tunnels) continued as rail lines running 1940s-era PCC streetcars through the 1970s. These lines became the foundation of the Muni Metro.

During World War II, because male employees had been called to serve in the military, both MSRy and Muni hired female 'motorettes' and conductors, including poet and author Maya Angelou in 1943.

=== 1970s and 1980s: Construction and reorganization ===
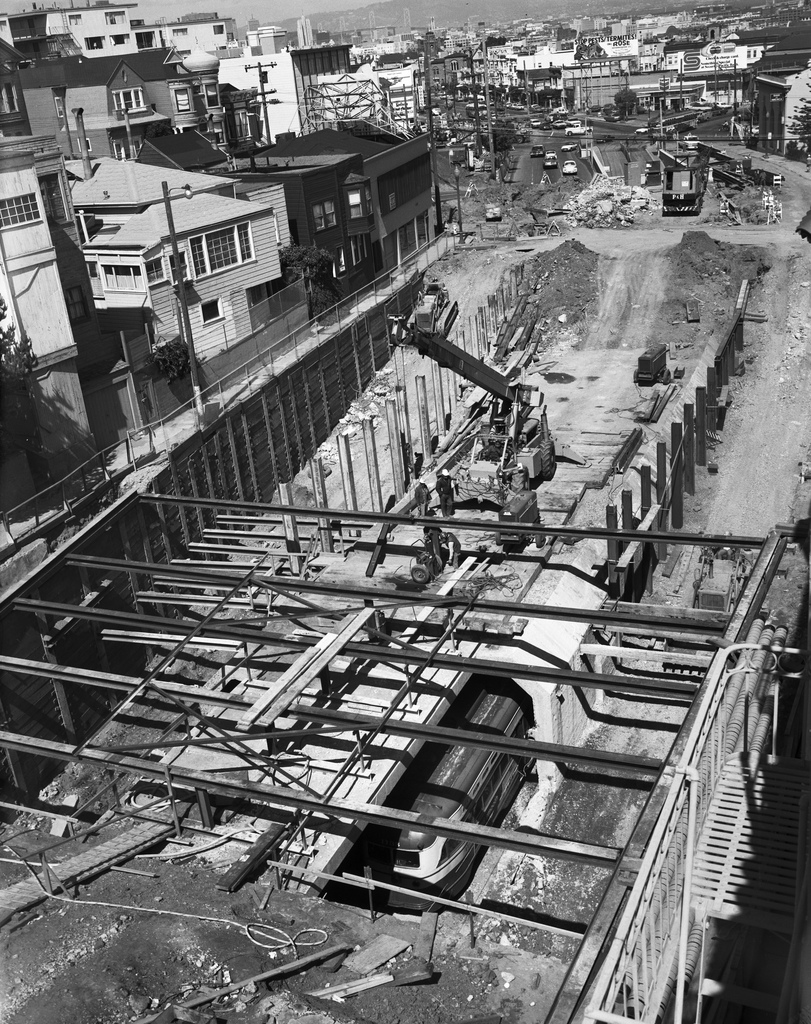
Work on the Market Street subway (1973)

In the 1950s and 1960s, the regional BART system was conceived as a much more extensive system than was eventually built, with plans for express trains through San Francisco and local service within San Francisco. Because it was assumed BART would provide local rail service, investment in Muni infrastructure failed to keep pace with major urban redevelopment projects. For example, BART was intended to provide Richmond district and Western Addition service as part of its Golden Gate Bridge/Marin line. This leaves a legacy of the inadequate 38-Geary bus serving these neighborhoods.

Construction on BART's Market Street tunnel started in 1967, with two decks tracks – the upper intended to provide local service. Major cost overruns in the BART project forced the state legislature to rescue the project in 1969: curtailing local service in San Francisco and converting the partially constructed stations into the basis of a new light-rail subway called the Muni Metro to connect the downtown stations to the Twin Peaks Tunnel and continuing along reserved tracks to St. Francis Circle. Construction on the metro began in 1970, but the project suffered from further cuts and design changes throughout the 1970s. The Muni Metro finally opened in February 1980, for one line (N-Judah), with other lines following later in 1980, but the many design compromises and piecemeal planning led to long-term operational challenges and inefficiencies.

In 1970, Muni also suffered a severe diesel bus crisis.

Muni experienced a diesel bus availability crisis in 1981–1982 when most of their diesel buses, 401 GMC and Flxible "New Looks" purchases in 1969, reached the end of their 12-year design life and funds for their replacement were not available. Most of the rest of the fleet were undersized 36-foot AM Generals purchased for neighborhood routes, and their use on heavier lines exacerbated conditions. The trolley bus fleet was in good order and had excess capacity at the time, so Muni improvised a few temporary services with them to help out. One such service was a trolley 14-Limited that used the abandoned trolley overhead on South Van Ness. The diesel 82-Chinatown was replaced with short runs of the 30-Stockton. But the trolleys could only go where their wires went.

Muni adopted some policies to alleviate future service issues due to an aged fleet. They would stagger bus purchases so not as large a portion of the fleet would hit retirement age at once. They would arrange for mid-life rebuilds to keep the buses more serviceable in their final years. And they would work to reduce the role of diesels in the total operation. Three trunk diesel lines were converted to trolley bus service in the next twelve years.

But these efforts have not been as successful as hoped. Out of necessity most of the fleet, 330 standard bus equivalents out of 506, were replaced in just two years in 1985–1986. (Standard bus equivalents factor the 30-foot and 60-foot into their equivalent capacity in 40-foot buses). And seven years passed without any new buses coming on board before Muni started its next full diesel fleet replacement cycle in 1999. This was fourteen years after the previous cycle instead of the twelve years that buses are designed to last. Muni is now aware that they must expect to keep diesel buses past their design life and have also found that funds granted for mid-life rebuilds require that the buses be kept longer still. As the fleet replacement cycle begins again in 2013, Muni has arranged for life-extending rebuilds of 142 buses, by count over 30% of the fleet.

In September 1982, the cable car system was shut down for 21 months for rebuilding, and subsequent massive line reorganizations occurred to provide stronger cross-town services.

Vintage fleet

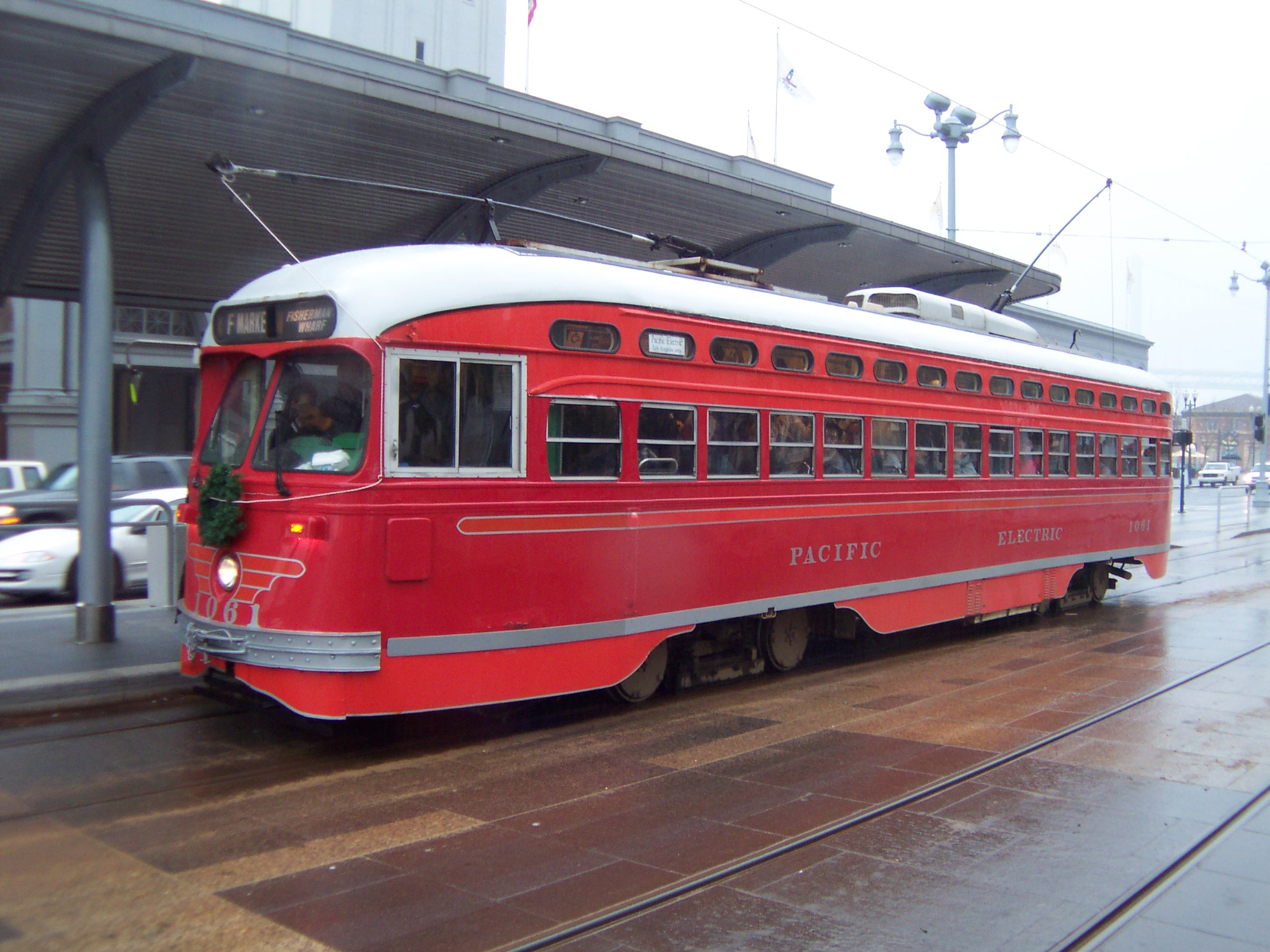
An F Market and Wharves heritage streetcar at the Ferry Building

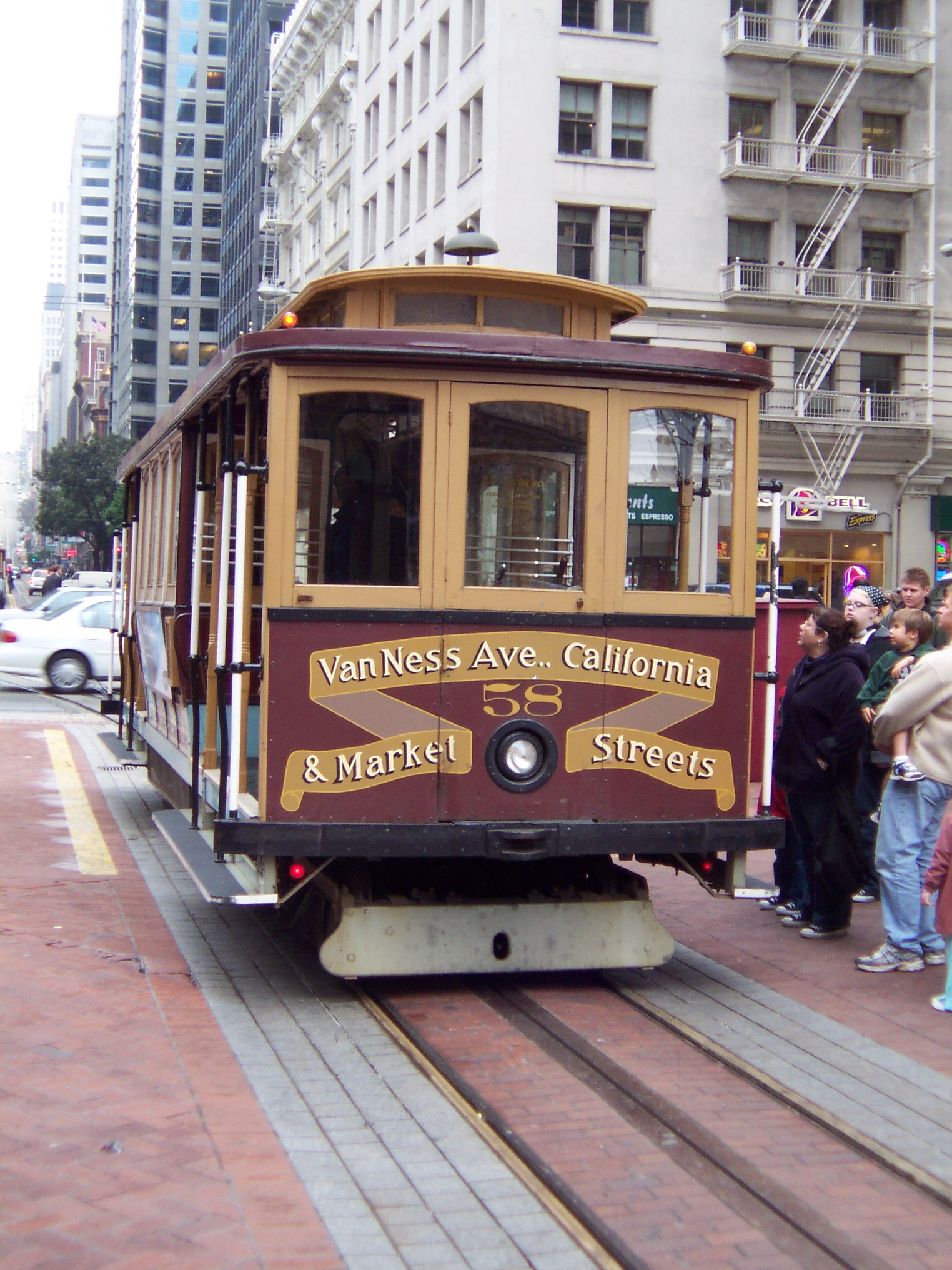
Cable car 58 at California and Market Streets

In 1983, Muni temporarily ran streetcars down Market Street as part of the San Francisco Historic Trolley Festival, initially conceived of as a substitute attraction for tourists during the one summer when no cable cars would be in operation. The service became so popular that the festival was repeated for several years following. Anticipating the return of permanent streetcar service on Market Street, Muni began rehabilitating tracks in 1987, a process that culminated in the opening of the F line in 1995.

The first modern Muni shelter was installed in front of the War Memorial Opera House in 1987.

=== 1990s: the "Muni Meltdown" ===
The F line was reintroduced in 1995 as a heritage streetcar service. Initially designed as a temporary tourist attraction to make up for the suspension of cable car service for rebuilding, the F has become a permanent fixture. E line service, initially known as the Muni Metro Extension, started in January 1998 initially as a shuttle between Embarcadero station and Caltrain's 4th and Townsend station.

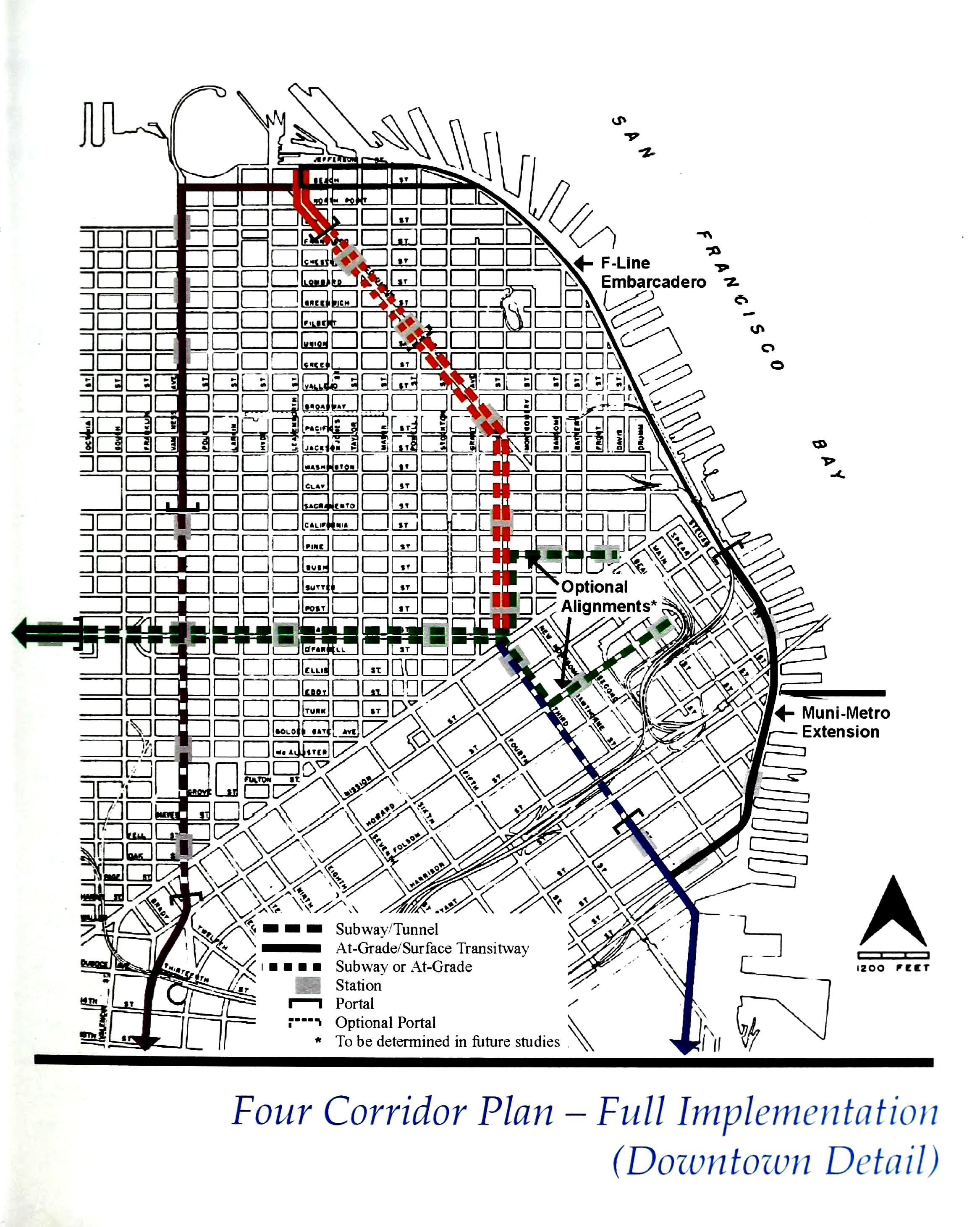
Three of the Four Corridor Plan routes from 1995 were planned to meet underground at Geary and Market

In June 1995, the San Francisco County Transportation Authority released The Four Corridor Plan, a vision to extend Muni Metro service along four major routes in the city: Bayshore (north-south along Third from the county line to California), Geary (east-west along Geary from 48th to Market/Kearny), North Beach (extending the new north-south Bayshore line along Kearny and Columbus to Fisherman's Wharf), and Van Ness (north-south along Van Ness from 16th and Mission to Aquatic Park), with a connector downtown to transfer between the Bayshore, Geary, and North Beach corridors. These have since been implemented as a combination of light rail (T Third) and bus rapid transit (Geary and Van Ness) services.

During the late 1990s, with aging equipment and poor management, Muni developed a reputation for poor and erratic service. In 1996 a group called Rescue Muni representing transit riders formed to organize concerns and press for change, advocating for the successful 1999 Proposition E that formed the San Francisco Municipal Transportation Agency and set service standards for Muni. In August 1998, San Francisco residents witnessed a protracted malfunction of Muni Metro after switching to an automatic train control implemented by Alcatel Transport Automation, culminating in an event that is now known as the Muni Meltdown.

Automatic control of Muni Metro light rail vehicles began on Saturday, August 22, three years behind schedule and at a cost of $70 million, three times the original estimate. Riders angry over delays confronted one driver during the Monday afternoon commute on August 24; he responded by locking himself in the driver's compartment and refused to move the train, halting all service for half an hour. Otherwise, no delays were attributable to the new automatic control system that Monday. However, by August 26, Mayor Willie Brown was threatening to sue Alcatel. Alcatel and Muni instead blamed delays on malfunctioning train cars. In addition, a proof-of-payment fare enforcement system went into effect that week, compounding rider confusion. Finally, riders who had previously been able to secure a seat by riding in the opposite direction (outbound) to Embarcadero station were forced to disembark there because of the E/Muni Metro Extension service that had begun in January; these changes and the delays frustrated many commuters. On Friday, August 28, 67 of the 131 LRVs (55 Boeing and 12 Breda) in the Muni Metro fleet were out of service for the morning commute; Mayor Brown personally rode from Civic Center to Embarcadero in the afternoon to experience the chaos for himself. Muni riders abandoned the underground system for carpools, taxis, buses, and F-Market streetcars after LRVs were delayed and stopped with no communication as to when they would resume service; transit times from 4th and Irving to Powell swelled to 120 minutes.

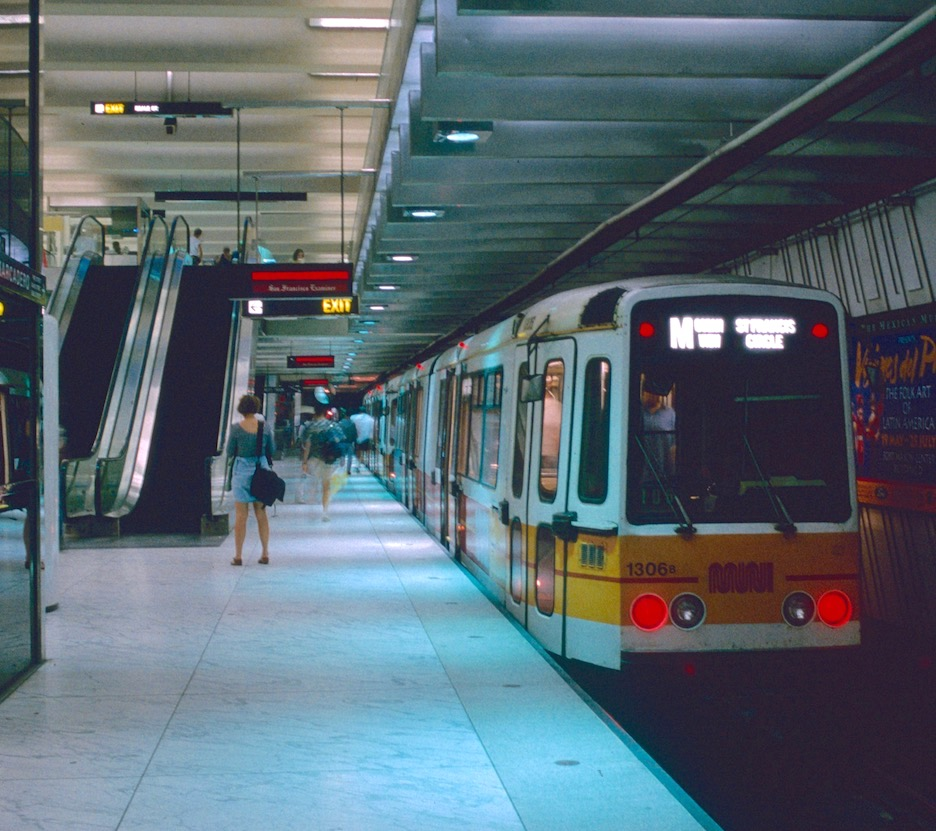
Train of Boeing Vertol US SLRVs in the Market Street subway (1993)

On August 31, two San Francisco Chronicle reporters staged a 1 1/2-mile (2.4 km) race: one took the train, and the other walked along Market from Civic Center to Embarcadero. The two reporters tied as both completed their trips in 23 minutes; this was an improvement compared to the previous week, at the height of the Meltdown, when the same trip on Muni Metro could take three times as long. Mayor Brown re-enacted the race as the pedestrian on September 3; this time, Muni Metro service had improved and train passengers completed the trip in just seven minutes. At the request of the San Francisco Examiner, a member of the executive committee for Rescue Muni tracked the length of each ride on her eight-stop daily commute to the Financial District from the Sunset that week. Four of the ten trips took longer than 40 minutes, and the best time was 15 minutes.

By the third week of operation under automatic train control, the Muni Meltdown had passed and service was uneventful, albeit with fewer LRVs than normal and with drivers onboard each train. Muni officials apologized for the rough transition and promised to continue to improve service; privately they called the Meltdown "the biggest fiasco in the railway's history."

In an effort to improve service, Muni began to replace its troublesome fleet of Boeing-Vertol light rail vehicles with newer Italian Breda light rail vehicles in late 1996. The two-decade-old fleet of Flyer trolleybuses were replaced with Electric Transit, Inc. (ETI) trolleybuses in the early 2000s. Likewise, the diesel bus fleet saw an infusion of 45 new NABI buses from AC Transit in 1999.

=== 2000s ===
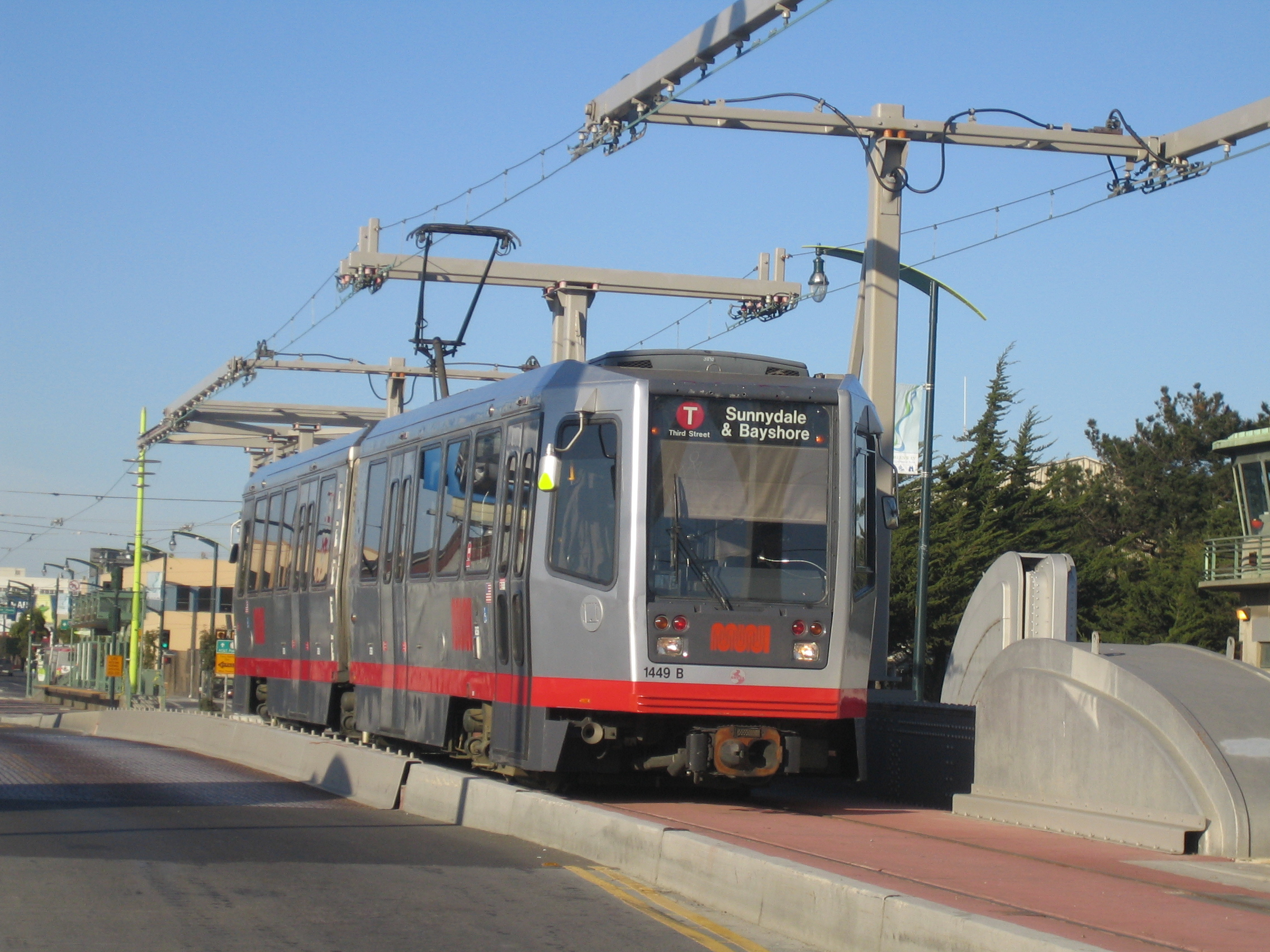
A light rail vehicle on the T Third Street line. The T line, the sixth Muni Metro line, opened on April 7, 2007.

Construction on a sixth light rail line from Caltrain Depot in Mission Bay to Visitacion Valley and Bayview/Hunters Point was completed in December 2006. The new line, named the T Third Street, consisted of 19 new high-platform stations at street-level.

On October 8, 2007, SFMTA's cable car signs were awarded the AdWheel Award as the best in print promotion by the American Public Transportation Association. Nathaniel Ford, executive director of Muni, said that the "marketing group has done an outstanding job making the key boarding areas more attractive and inviting for residents and our guests."

On November 15, 2007, city officials announced that they were looking into the possibility of adding double-decker buses to the Muni fleet, which would be operating mostly on the 38 Geary and the 14 Mission routes. The test period started on December 12, 2007, and ended on January 8, 2008.

On December 1, 2007, Mayor Gavin Newsom announced that the entire city fleet, including all of Muni buses, are henceforth powered with biodiesel, a combination of 80% petroleum diesel fuel and 20% biofuel, to reduce carbon emissions. Muni's current hybrid bus fleet currently runs on biodiesel.

On July 17, 2009, a Muni LRV rear-ended another at West Portal Station. That accident injured 48 people.

On December 5, 2009, the Muni system underwent its most extensive changes in over 30 years, in an attempt by the SFMTA to reduce its budget shortfall. This involved changes to over 60% of its bus and light rail routes, including the elimination of six bus routes. Changes included reduced frequency of service, shortened or altered routes, and earlier termination of service, although a few of the busiest lines, such as the 38 Geary, saw service increases.

=== 2010s ===
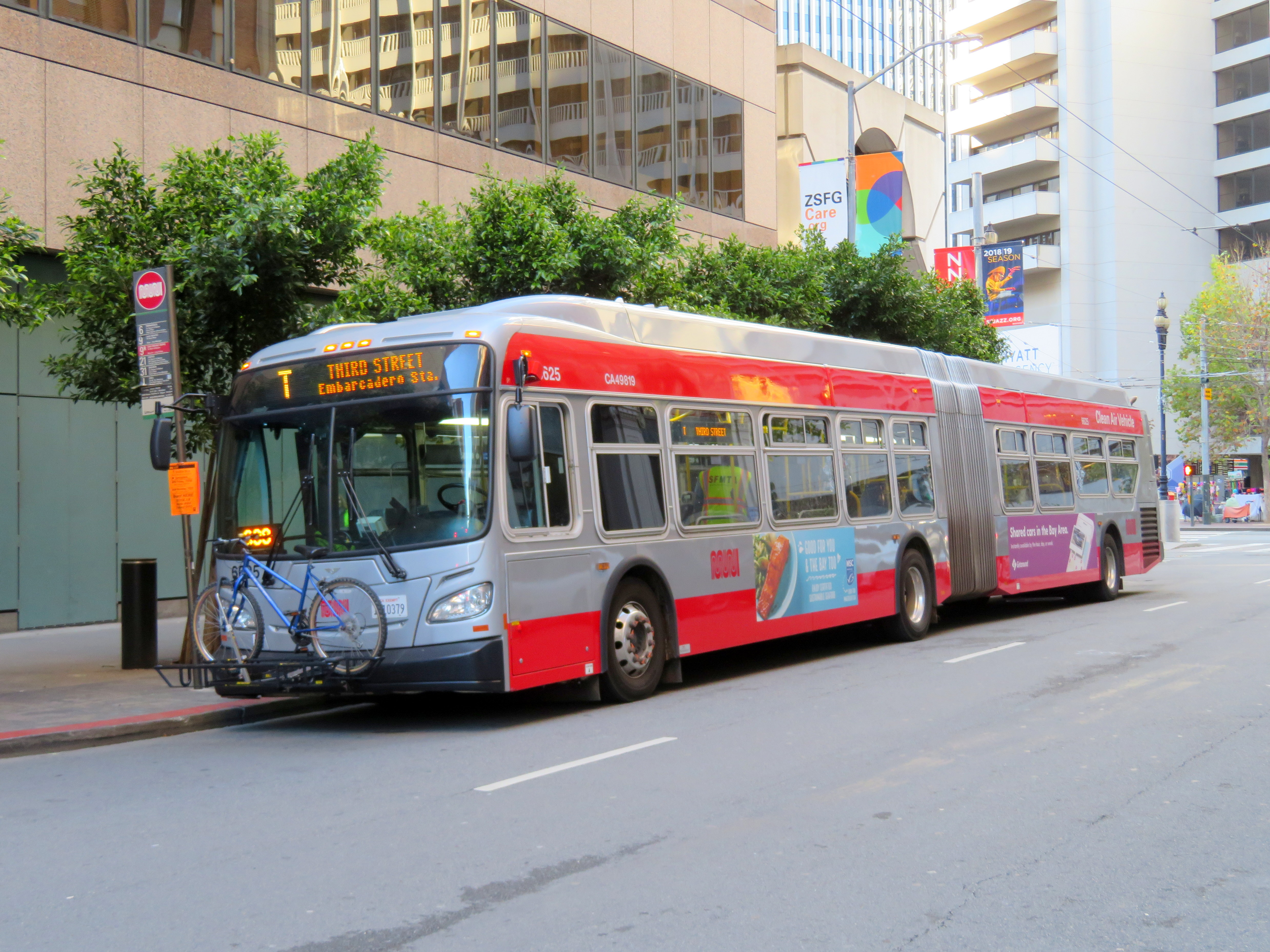
A New Flyer XDE60 bus in 2018. The New Flyer Xcelsior buses were bought between 2013 and 2019 to replace Muni's aging fleet.

The 2010s started with severe cuts to Muni service. On February 26, 2010, the SFMTA board, which oversees Muni operations, voted for Muni to undergo further extensive changes in a further attempt to reduce its budget shortfall. Months after the cuts were enacted, significant portions of the service were restored through additional funding and cutting operational costs. Further improvements were made throughout the decade, amidst changes in both city and agency leadership, with the implementation of the "Muni Forward" project and all-door boarding.

In 2011, Nathaniel Ford, the head executive of the SFMTA, stepped down and Ed Reiskin took his place. After the difficult cuts in 2010, city leaders cited the "Transit Effectiveness Project", later rebranded as "Muni Forward", as a priority for improving service on Muni. In April 2015, the SFMTA launched the implementation of Muni Forward. Service changes involve renaming routes designated as "Limited" to "Rapid", a redesigned system map, and increased levels of service on the busiest bus routes. Infrastructure improvements include the addition of transit signal priority, bus bulbs, and bus-only lanes to more locations, and trackway repairs along the Muni Metro system. The 2010s also included the start of construction on bus rapid transit projects on Van Ness and Geary Streets and the initiation of planning for new subway extensions that would potentially reach the Marina District and Park Merced.

On July 1, 2012, Muni was the first transit agency in North America to implement all-door boarding throughout its system. The practice already existed in the Muni Metro as "Proof-of-Payment" and was expanded to include all bus service.

With the Breda cars approaching 20 years of use, the SFMTA announced an order in 2014 for 175 new Siemens S200 cars for its Muni Metro lines. The first of the new cars was delivered in November 2017 with plans to finish the replacement of the entire fleet by 2027. This train procurement, in addition to replacing cars on existing lines, was made in order to supply the additional service required for the Central Subway and to the Mission Bay neighborhood and Chase Center. Throughout the 2010s, Muni also procured new buses and replaced over 90 percent of its diesel bus fleet and replaced all of its aging trolleybuses, improving performance for its bus fleet.

=== 2020s ===
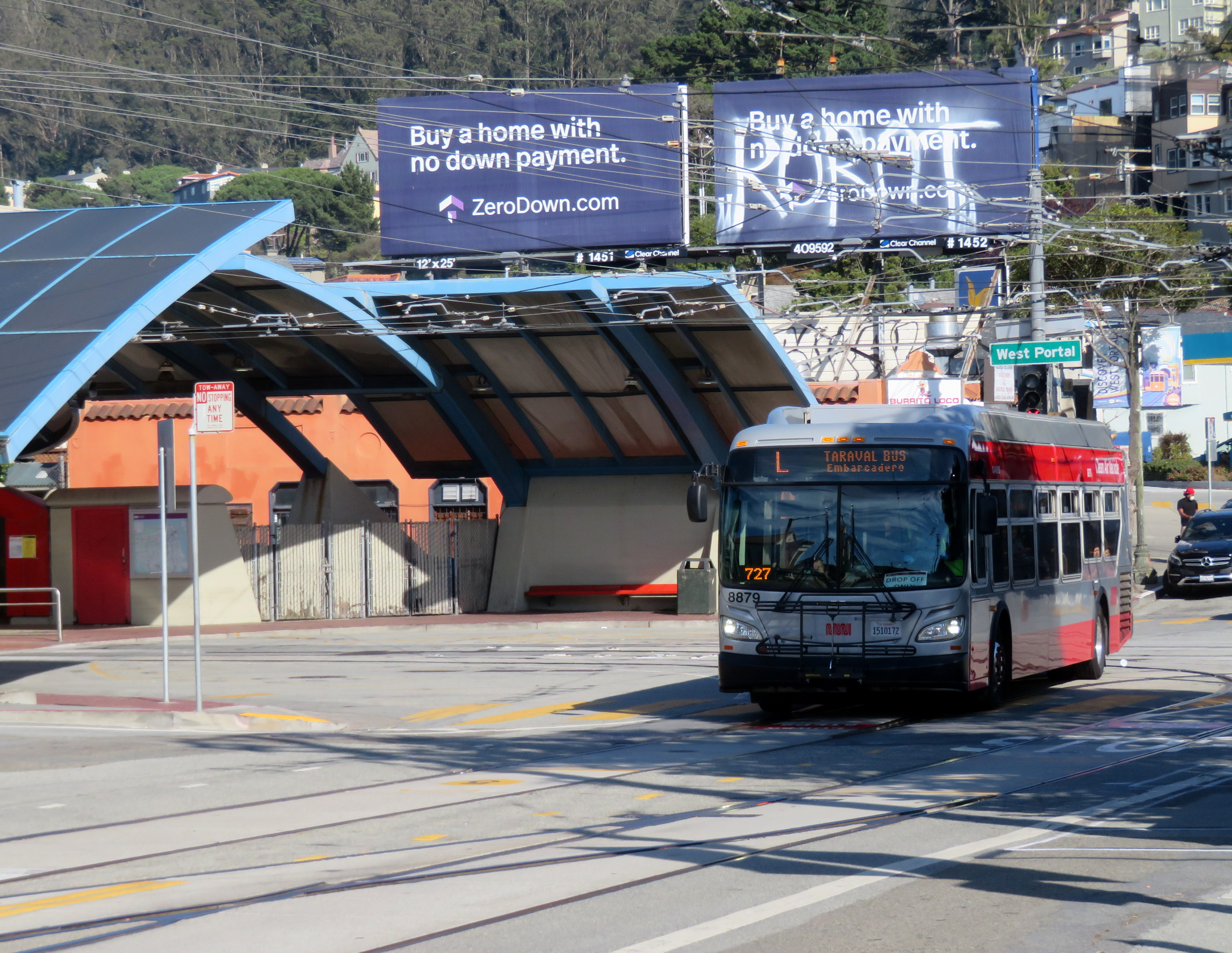
L Taraval rail replacement bus at the closed West Portal station, August 2020

Amid the COVID-19 pandemic, ridership numbers had dropped 70–90% across the system. Muni Metro services, with an over 90% decline in riders, were replaced by bus bridges on March 30 to streamline sanitation procedures. By April 6, service had been eliminated on all but 17 of the agency's then 89 routes with San Francisco Municipal Transportation Agency Director of Transportation Jeffrey Tumlin calling it "the worst Muni service since 1906."

Light rail service resumed briefly in August 2020 with significant route changes, but was discontinued and replaced by buses after just three days of operation (August 22–24) because two overhead wire splices failed in the subway portion of the line within 72 hours and an employee in the system's control center tested positive for COVID-19. The splice failures in 2020 meant that passengers could be trapped for an extended period of time in an enclosed light rail car during the pandemic. A similar splice that failed in April 2019 in the Market Street subway between Powell and Civic Center disrupted services system-wide for more than 12 hours, and led Mayor London Breed to seek a replacement for Muni head Ed Reiskin. Metallurgical analysis of the failed splices (including the failed splice from April 2019) showed the materials did not meet their specified tensile strength.

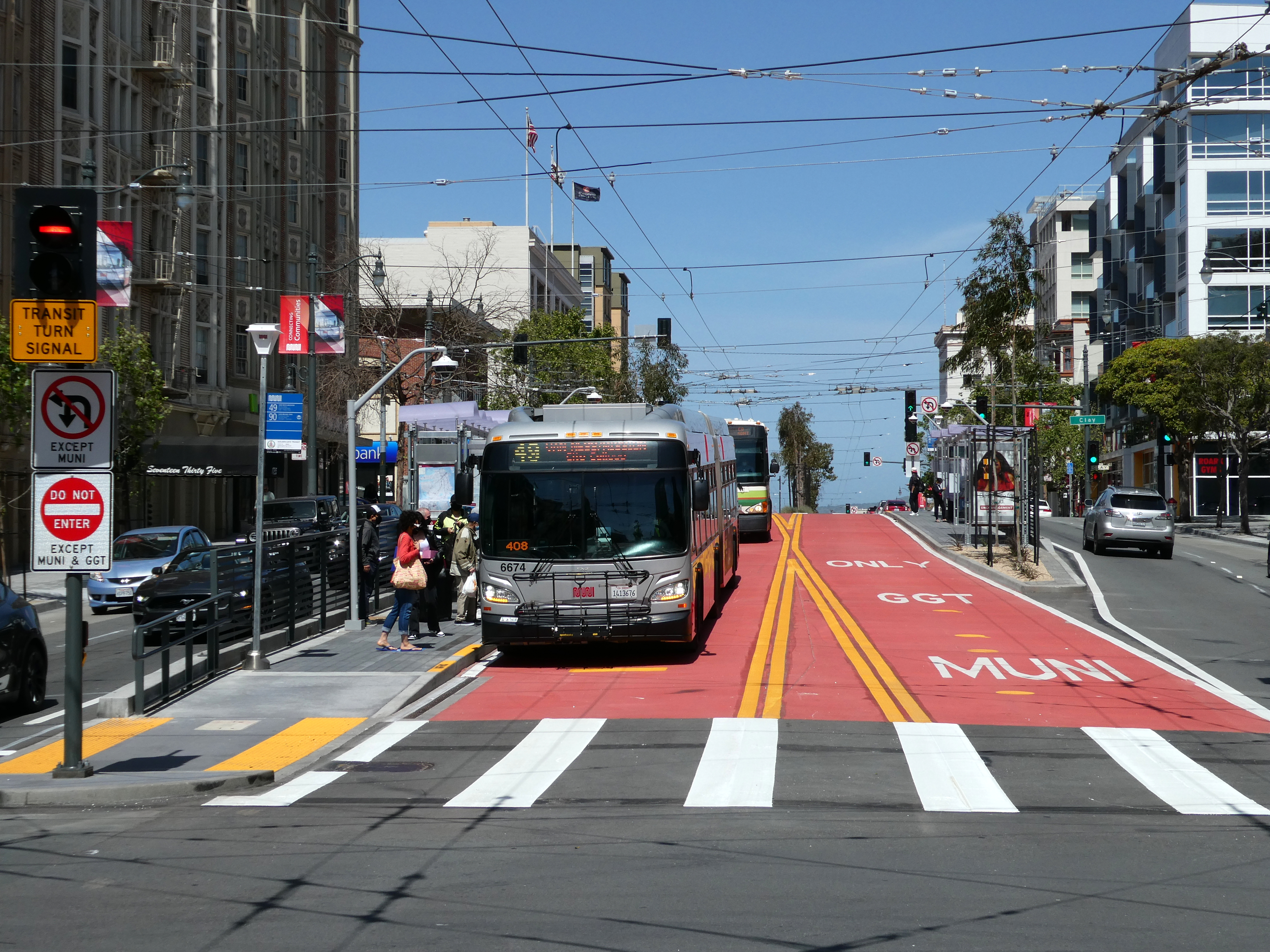
The Van Ness Bus Rapid Transit project was completed in 2022, improving service along Van Ness Avenue

Some additional bus routes were restored throughout Fall 2020 and into 2021 to address overcrowding and increasing ridership, including new short routes on the 1-California, 5-Fulton, and 14R Mission Rapid. On September 19, 2020, the 30-Stockton was extended to Sports Basement in The Presidio to accommodate longer, 60-foot buses along the entire route. This change resulted in many complaints from Marina District residents who complained about parking removal and low ridership along the extension. On December 19th, 2020, light rail service resumed on the J Church on a surface only route. Light rail service at the T Third Street resumed on January 23, 2021 along with the temporary resumption of the 15-Third Street on a new express route.

N Judah, K/T Ingleside/Third Street, and S Shuttle subway service resumed on May 15, 2021, as did F Market & Wharves historic streetcar service. M Ocean View rail service resumed on August 14, 2021.

Van Ness Bus Rapid Transit service began on April 1, 2022.

== System expansion ==
=== Muni Metro and rail service ===
Several proposals for Muni Metro and rail service expansion for Muni are undergoing planning and construction. In addition, several projects are underway to improve the effectiveness of existing lines, many as a part of the Muni Forward initiative. On February 19, 2016, Muni released a Draft Rail Capacity Study, which outlines proposed system improvements through the year 2050 and beyond. This three-tier proposal consists of enhancements that will improve system efficiency and expand the system; estimated cost is $9–16 billion. The ConnectSF planning project, a cooperation between several city agencies including Muni, identified candidate corridors for future subway and rapid transit corridor expansion. The transit strategy report from the project concluded that two new corridors should be developed: the Geary Boulevard and 19th Avenue corridor and an extension of the Central Subway to Fisherman's Wharf.

Service improvements for the L Taraval line are under construction and projected to complete in 2024. Improvements on the J, K, and M lines have also been planned and approved, with some construction beginning in 2024. Future improvements on the N Judah line are also planned, with a long-term goal of running three-car trains on the line.

==== Central Subway ====
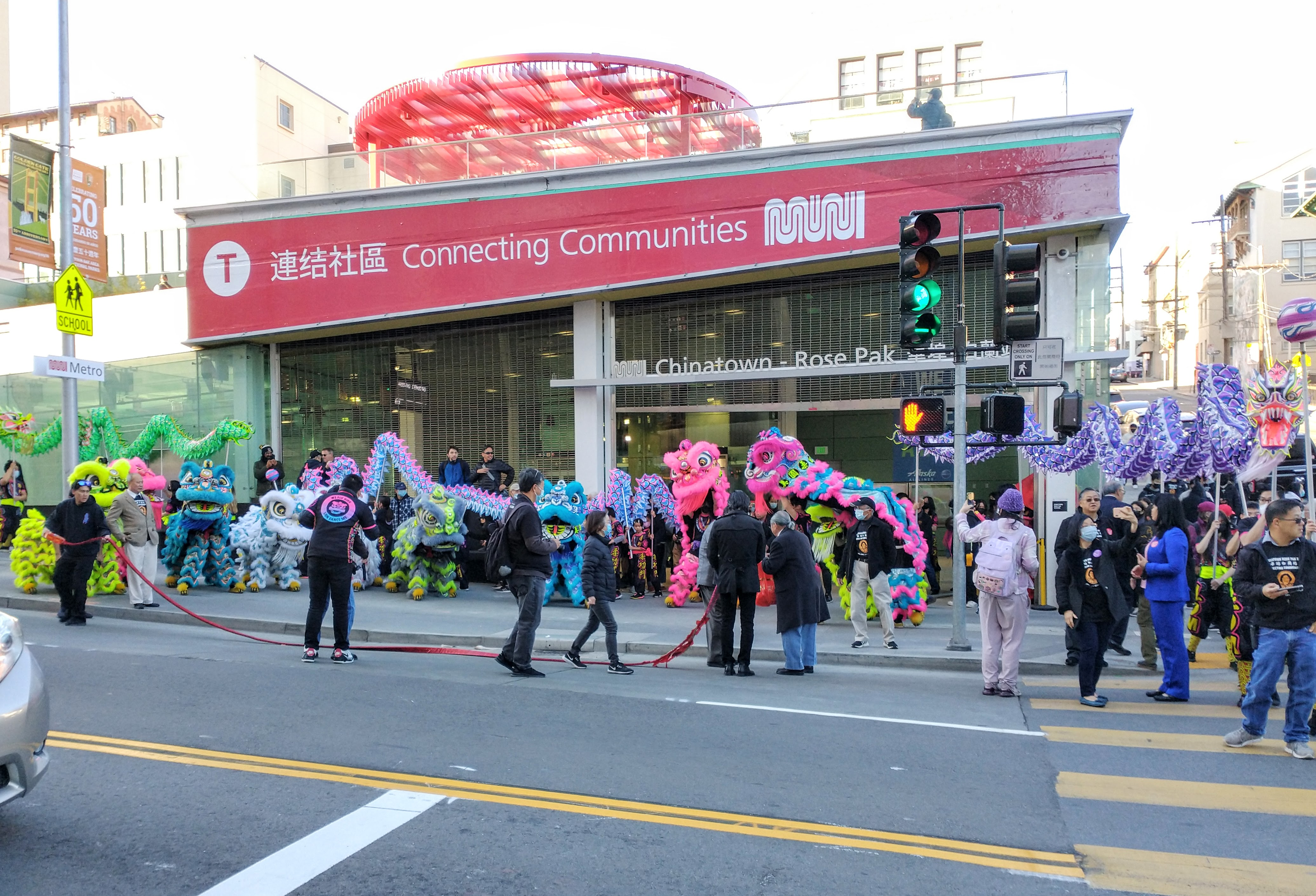
Opening ceremonies at the Chinatown station of the Central Subway in November 2022

An underground expansion for the T line opened on November 19, 2022, after ten years of construction. Full service began on January 7, 2023. Dubbed the Central Subway, the expansion features three new underground stations at Moscone Center, Union Square, and Chinatown and one above-ground station at 4th and Brannan Streets. Construction included tunneling up to Columbus Ave and Washington Square Park, but the T line stopped at Chinatown. This project cost about $1.95 billion.

Muni is also considering a future extension into North Beach and Fisherman's Wharf or to the Marina District and The Presidio which may be built in a third phase of the T Third project. Formal planning for the extension began in late 2018 with an Alternatives Study.

=== Buses and streetcars ===
The average speed of Muni vehicles has been slowly declining over the years due to increasing vehicular congestion and is now merely 8 miles (13 km) per hour. In response, Muni launched plans to make its transit vehicles move faster through the city. Muni Forward (previously called the Transit Effectiveness Project) was launched in May 2006 to take a comprehensive look at the entire Muni system and to see where service can be improved or streamlined to provide faster and more reliable service. The project was launched in a context in which twenty-five years had passed since the last comprehensive review, and travel patterns had changed, traffic congestion had increased, operating costs had risen and on-time performance had dropped since then. Under the Muni Forward project, service improvements were implemented on many lines such as the 5 Fulton and 14R Mission. Further improvements on lines such as the 28 19th Avenue, 22 Fillmore, 30 Stockton, and others are planned.

For streetcar service, extending the E Embarcadero and the F Market and Wharves into Mission Bay and the Fort Mason Tunnel is possible. Existing F Market & Wharves service is planned to be improved under the Better Market Street project with a new loop at Civic Center.

Additionally, there are plans to expand trolleybus service in several parts of the city. Several extensions to existing trolleybus lines are planned, including 14-Mission service to the Daly City BART station, 6-Haight/Parnassus service to West Portal Station, 33-Ashbury/18th Street service across Potrero Hill to Third Street, 45-Union-Stockton service to the Letterman Digital Arts Center in the Presidio and 24-Divisadero service into the former Hunters Point shipyard. Other expansion plans include electrification of some diesel bus lines, with the most likely lines for conversion being the 9-San Bruno, 10-Townsend and 47-Van Ness. Electrification of the 10-Townsend line would likely be joined by an extension of the line across Potrero Hill to San Francisco General Hospital. Other lines that may be electrified are the 7-Haight-Noriega, 27-Bryant, and 43-Masonic.

== See also ==
- Key System
- Market Street Railway Company
- San Francisco cable car system
- Trolleybuses in San Francisco
