= List of San Francisco Municipal Railway lines =

The San Francisco Municipal Railway (Muni) is the primary public transit system for San Francisco, California. Muni is part of the San Francisco Municipal Transportation Agency, which is also responsible for the streets, parking, traffic signals, and other transportation in the city. In 2019, Muni had the eighth-highest ridership among systems in the United States, with an average weekday ridership of 684,600. Service is operated to all parts of San Francisco, including Treasure Island, as well as small sections of Daly City and Marin County.

Muni operates seven light rail lines in the Muni Metro system, two streetcar lines (E Embarcadero and F Market & Wharves), and three cable car lines. Daytime bus service includes 44 local routes, 5 limited-stop "Rapid" routes, and 15 peak-hour express routes. Four additional express routes provide weekend service to the Marin Headlands, service to Oracle Park (home of the San Francisco Giants), and the Chase Center (home of the Golden State Warriors) and supplement BART in the early morning. Overnight night bus "Owl" service—part of the All Nighter network—includes eight 24-hour routes, two night-only routes, three bus replacements of Muni Metro lines, and five-weekend early-morning Muni Metro replacement lines. Fourteen local routes (two only at certain times), one rapid route, and four Owl routes run as electric trolleybuses. Muni service operates out of ten yards and garages: one cable car barn, three light rail/streetcar yards, two trolleybus garages, and four bus garages.

Routes have two-part names consisting of a number or a letter and a designation, such as "19 Polk" and "N Judah," where the second portion is usually the street on which the longest section of the route runs (or in some cases, a neighborhood, destination or landmark). Light rail and streetcar lines are lettered, while bus routes are numbered. The letter/number scheme was created by Muni, while the two-part naming scheme was created by the Market Street Railway, which Muni absorbed in 1944. The three cable car lines are largely known by name (Powell-Mason, Powell-Hyde, and California), though they are abbreviated to PM, PH, and C on maps, and have internal numbers 59–61 for operational purposes.

Muni began service on December 28, 1912, when the A Geary-Park line was inaugurated, running between the Financial District and the Richmond District on the western side of the city. The streetcar system was expanded over the next 16 years, including the Stockton Street Tunnel in 1914, Twin Peaks Tunnel in 1918 and the Sunset Tunnel in 1928. Muni began operating buses in 1917, and trolleybuses in 1941. The city acquired the competing Market Street Railway in 1944, doubling the size of Muni; its purchase of the bankrupt California Street Cable Railroad in 1952 made it the city's sole transit operator. Replacement of streetcars by buses in the 1940s and 1950s left only five streetcar lines; they were converted to Muni Metro light rail in 1980 with the completion of the Market Street subway. Numerous service changes over the lifetime of Muni gave rise to the lines in use today; a number of other lines have been discontinued.

During the COVID-19 pandemic, service was initially reduced to a limited set of "core service" routes, then gradually expanded. As of July 2022, six Muni Metro routes, one streetcar route, one bus replacement for a Muni Metro route, three cable car routes, 43 local bus routes, four Rapid routes, and three express routes are in operation. Several of those routes have been temporarily modified. Twelve overnight Owl routes and one early-morning express route are in operation.

== Cable car lines ==
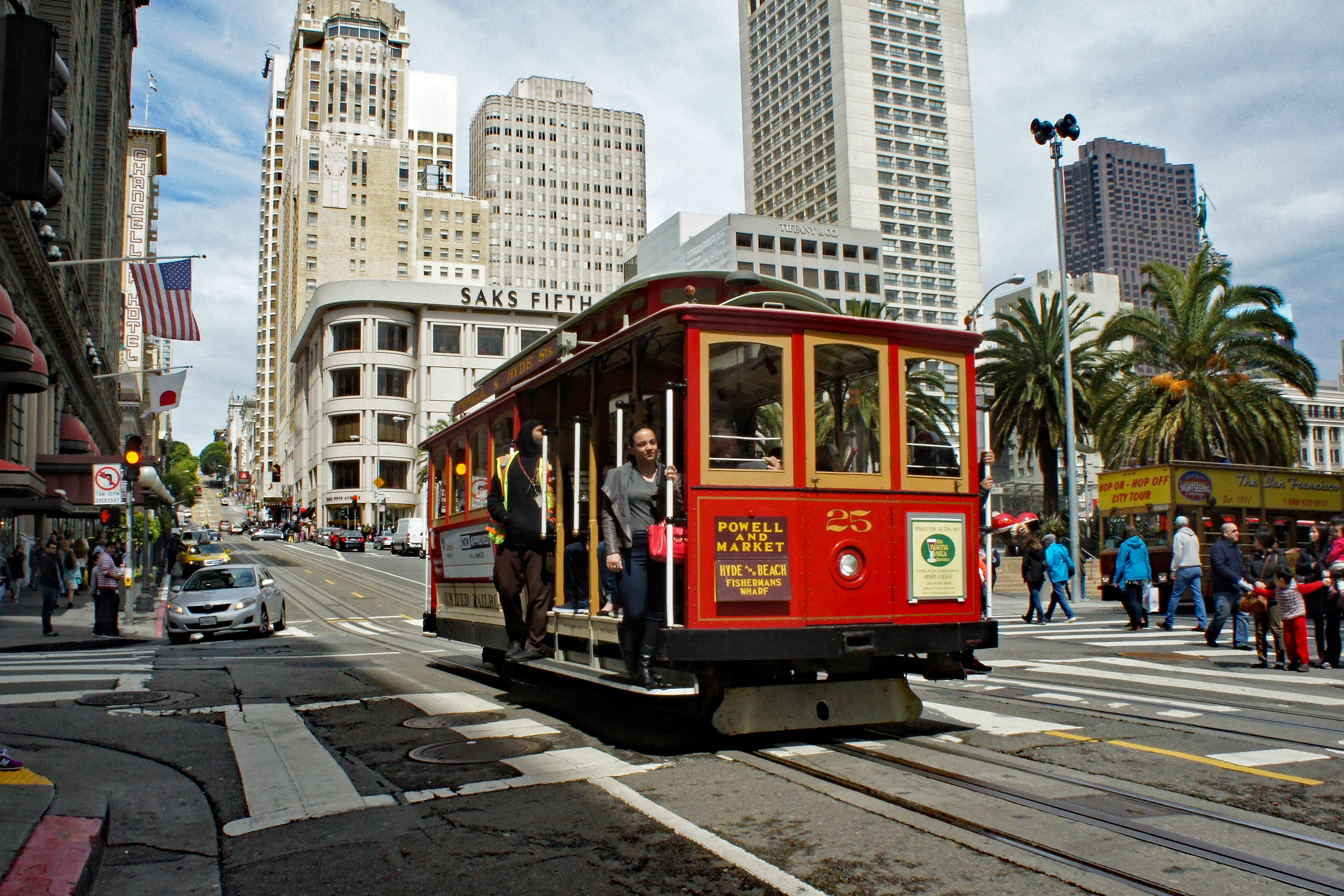
A cable car on Powell Street in 2015

All three cable car lines are based out of the cable car barn at Mason and Washington.

Muni cable car lines
Route	Inbound terminal	Outbound terminal	Ridership
California (C)	California and Market	California and Van Ness	4,000
Powell-Hyde (PH)	Powell and Market	Hyde and Beach	7,800
Powell-Mason (PM)	Powell and Market	Taylor and Bay	5,100

== Muni Metro and historic streetcar lines ==
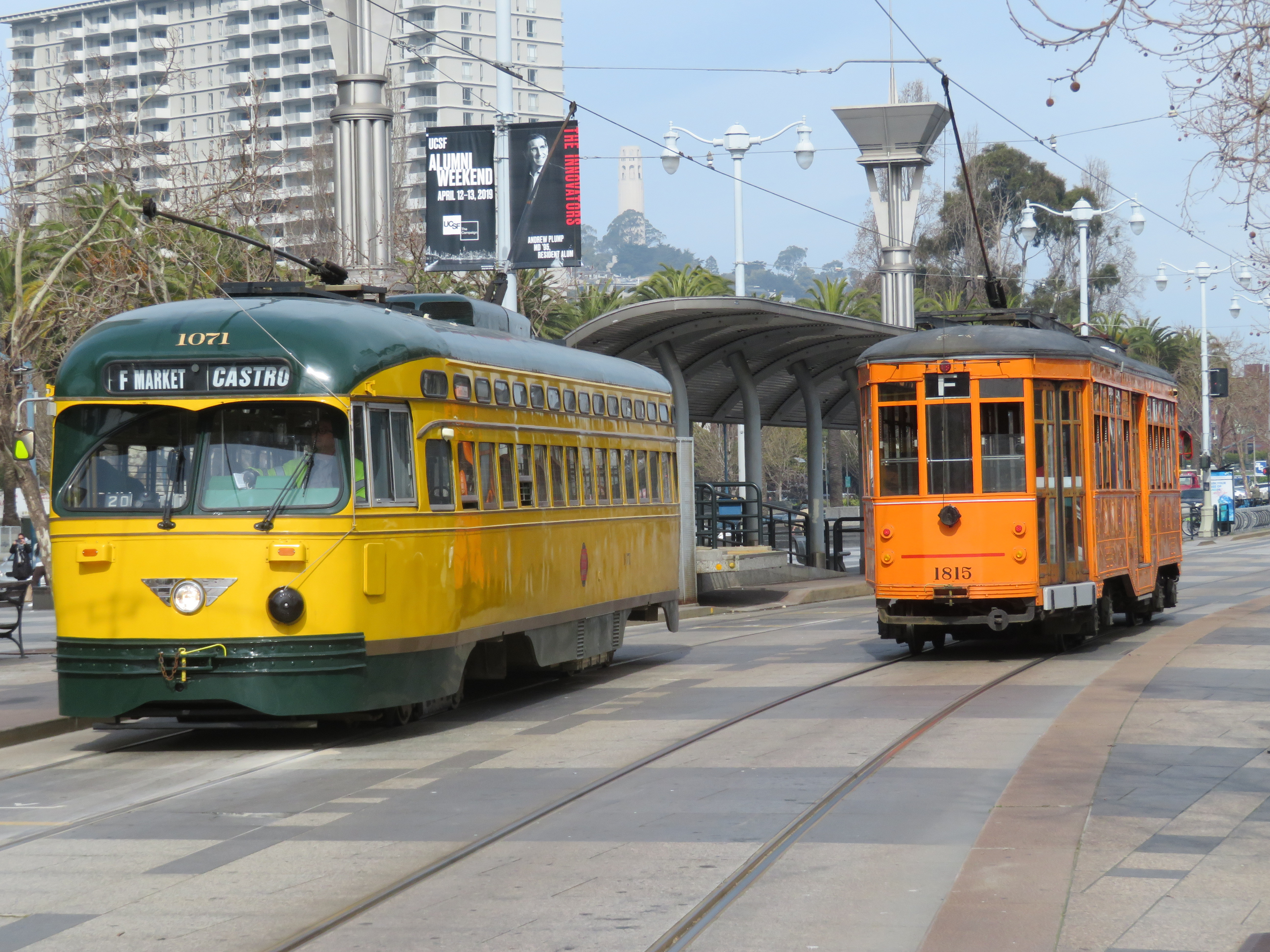
A PCC streetcar and an ex-Milan streetcar on the F Market & Wharves line at the Ferry Building

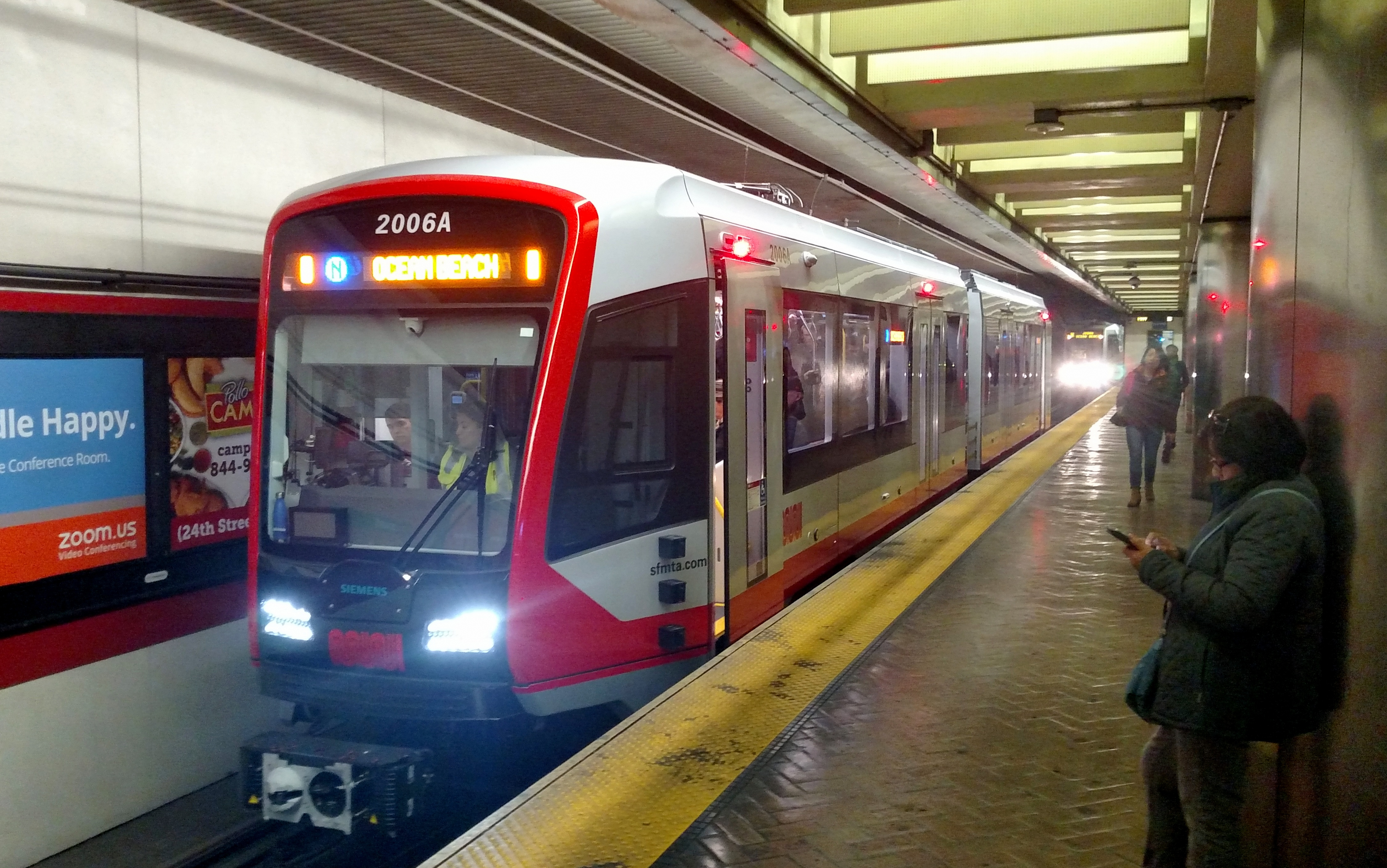
An N Judah train at Powell station in 2017

Muni runs six Muni Metro light rail lines (J, K, L, M, N, and T), plus a shuttle service (S). The S Shuttle operates as an additional subway service at peak hours; extended S service is also used to serve events at Oracle Park (primarily San Francisco Giants games) and Chase Center (primarily Golden State Warriors games).

Two streetcar lines (E and F) use historic streetcars but serve as full transit routes rather than mere tourist attractions. Muni Metro lines are based out of two yards, Green Division (located at Balboa Park station) and Muni Metro East; the historic streetcar lines are based at Cameron Beach Yard (also near Balboa Park).

All routes except the E Embarcadero are in operation.

Muni streetcar lines
Route	Inbound terminal	Outbound terminal
E Embarcadero	Jones and Beach (Fisherman's Wharf)	4th and King (Caltrain Depot)
F Market & Wharves	Jones and Beach (Fisherman's Wharf)	17th Street and Castro
J Church	Embarcadero	Balboa Park
K Ingleside	Embarcadero	Balboa Park
L Taraval	Embarcadero	46th Avenue and Wawona (SF Zoo)
M Ocean View	Embarcadero	San Jose and Geneva (Balboa Park)
N Judah	4th and King (Caltrain Depot)	Judah and La Playa (Ocean Beach)
S Shuttle	Embarcadero	West Portal
T Third Street	Chinatown	Sunnydale

== Local bus lines ==
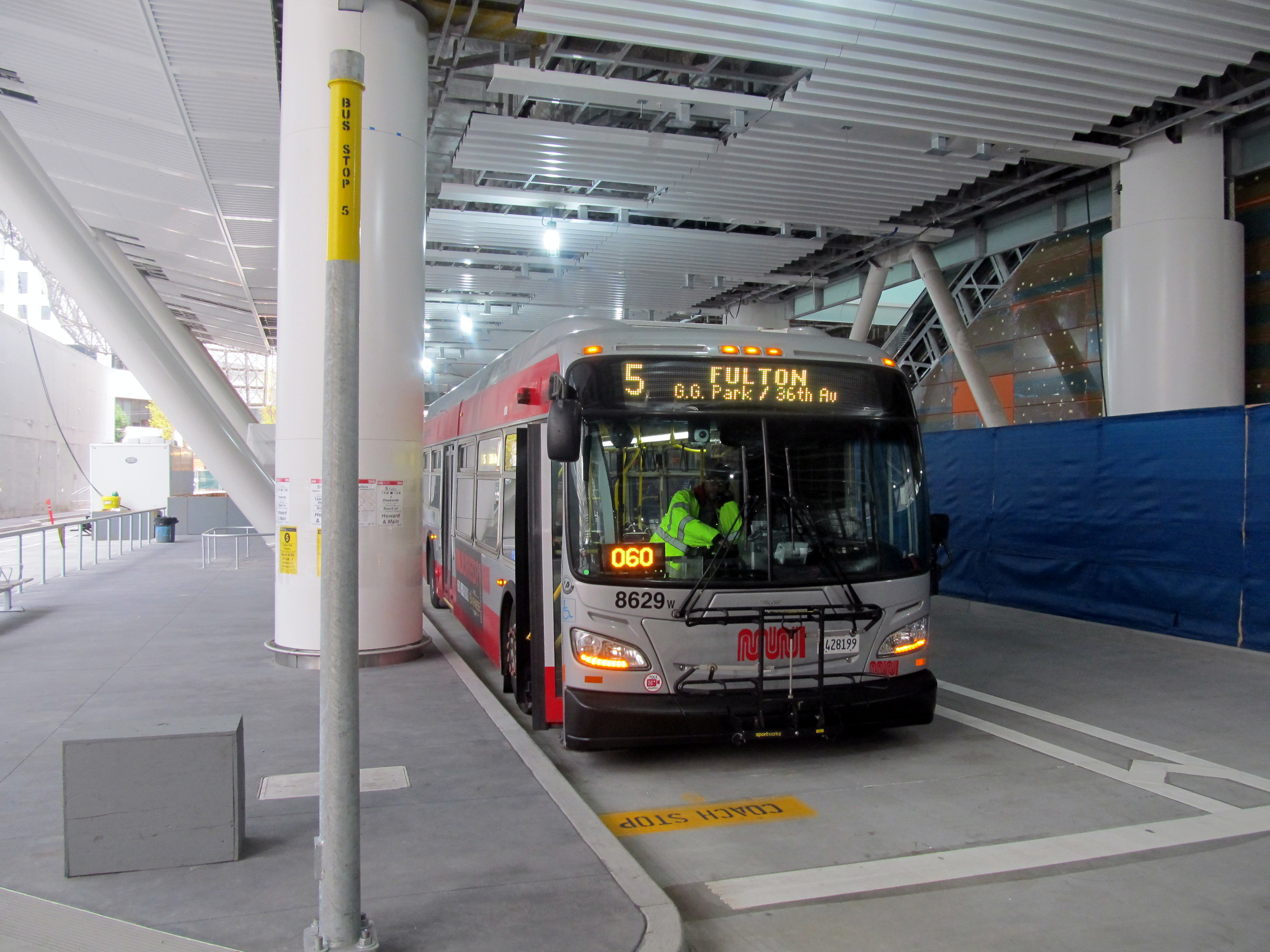
A route 5 Fulton bus at the street-level bus plaza at the Salesforce Transit Center in 2018

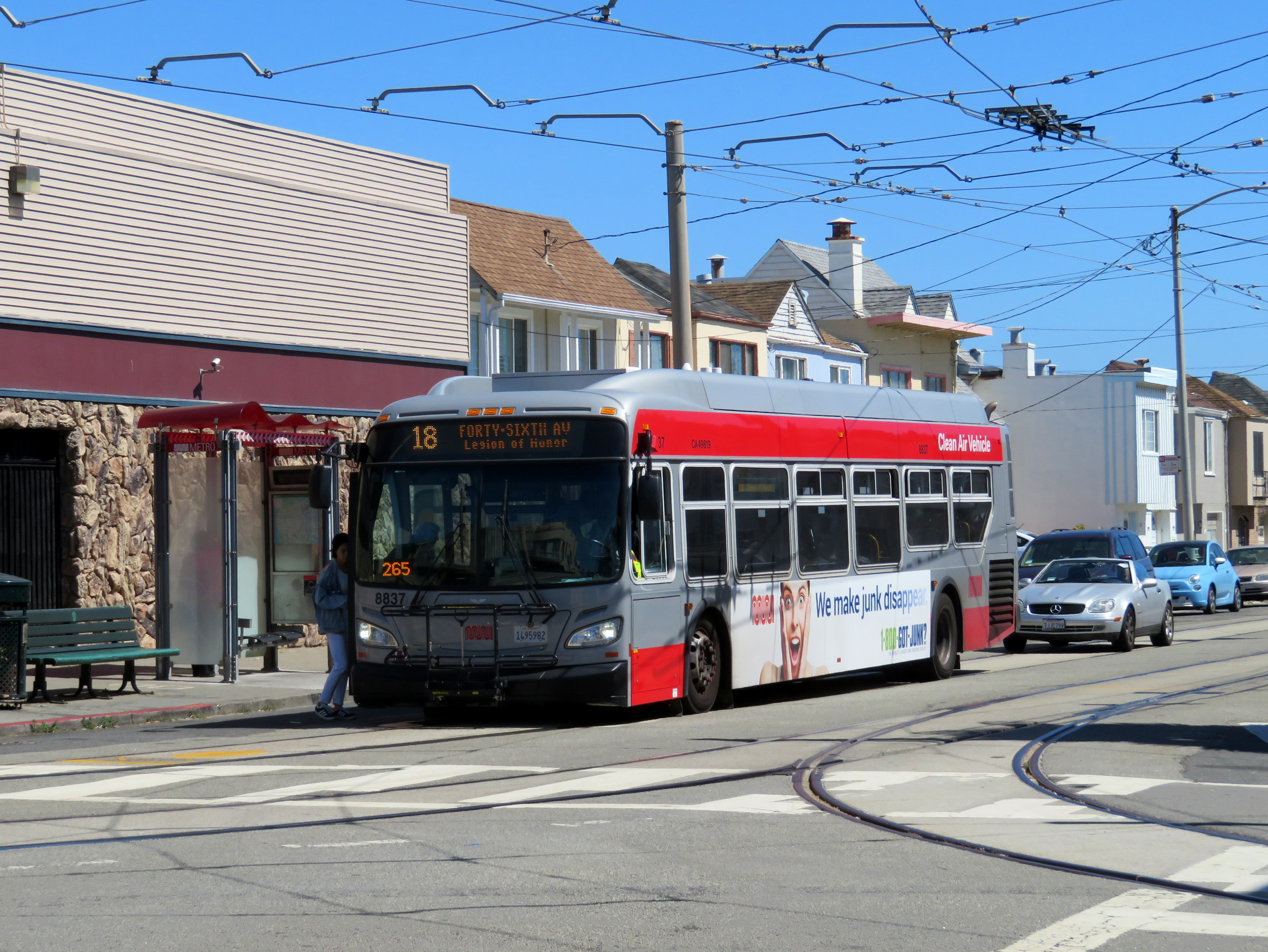
A route 18 bus on 46th Avenue in 2018

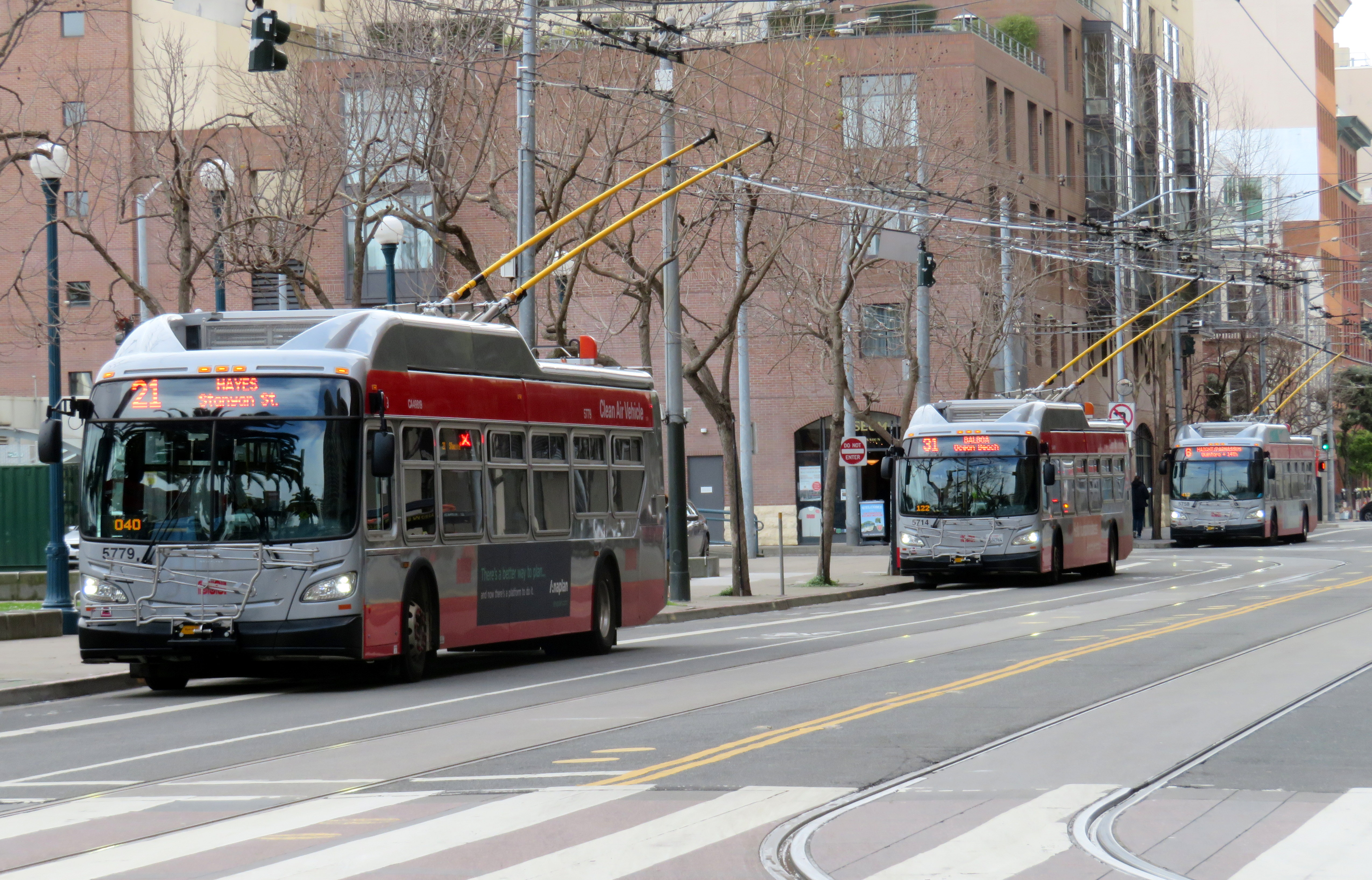
Route 21 Hayes and 31 Balboa trolleybuses at Ferry Plaza in 2019

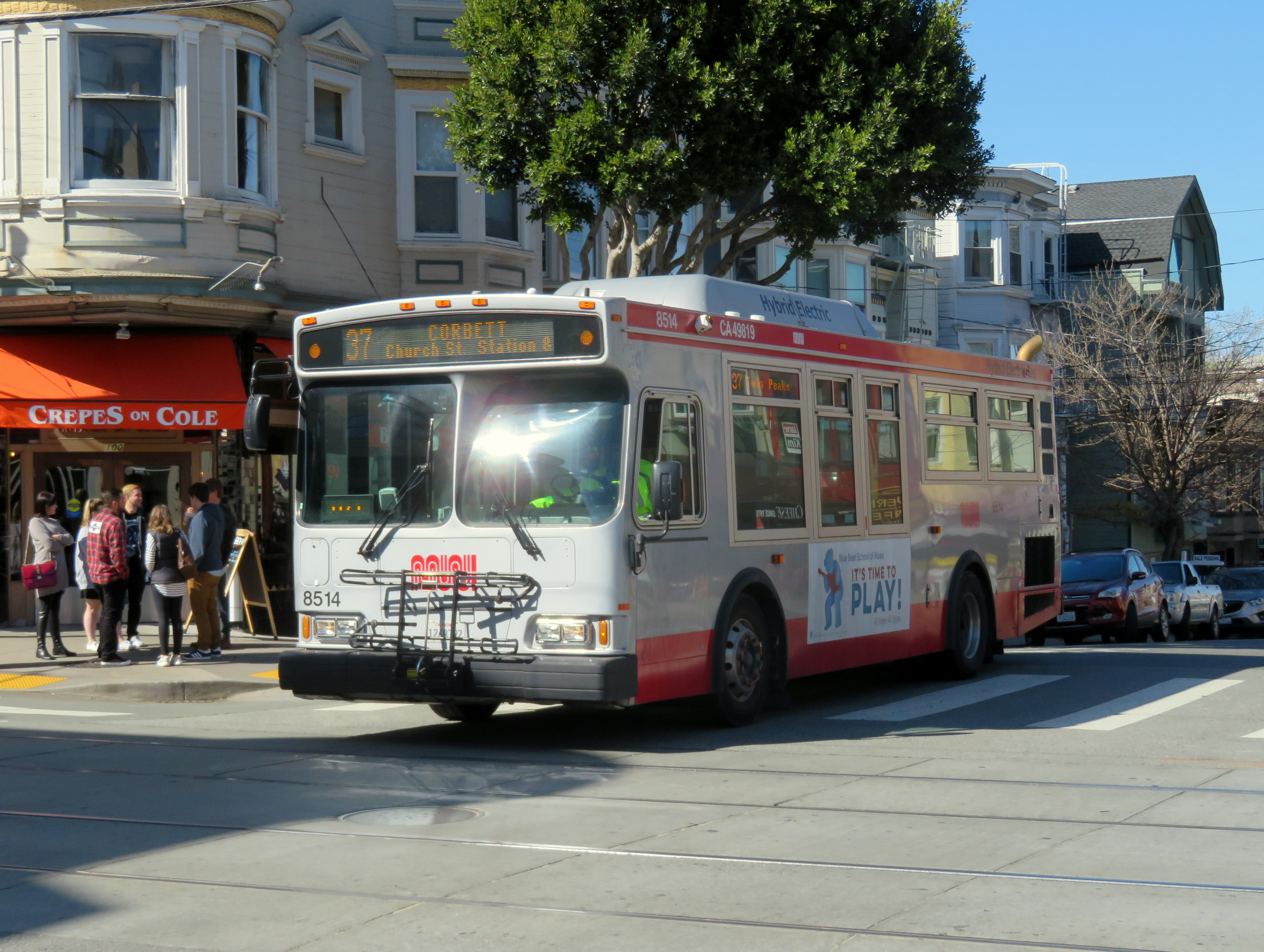
A 30-foot (9.1 m) route 37 Corbett bus in Cole Valley in 2018

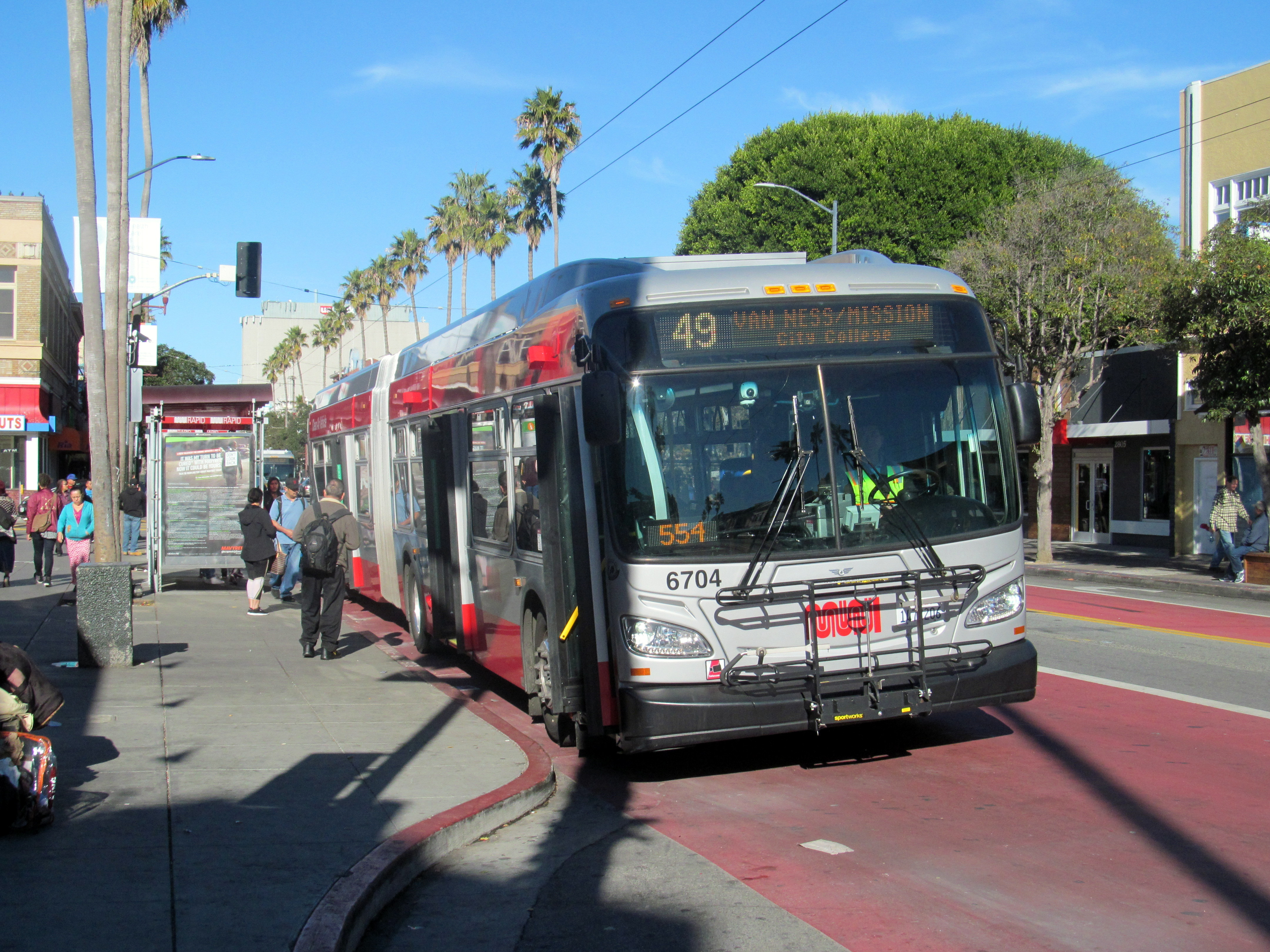
A route 49 bus on red transit-only lanes in the Mission District in 2017

Muni operates 44 local bus routes. Most routes operate on weekdays and weekends; the 41 and 88 operate only during weekday peak hours. A number of routes have different terminals during evenings and/or weekends. Route 5 uses trolleybuses only during evenings and weekends. Route 9 uses articulated buses on weekends.

Key to table notes
†	Electric trolleybus routes
♦	Community routes using 30–32-foot (9.1–9.8 m) buses
^	Routes using 60-foot (18 m) articulated buses

Muni local bus lines
Route	Note	Inbound terminal	Outbound terminal	Ridership
1 California	†	Clay and Drumm	Geary and 33rd Avenue	23,500
2 Clement	Suspended	Steuart and Market (Ferry Plaza)	Clement and 14th Avenue (Park Presidio)	5,200
2 Sutter	†	Steuart and Market	California and Presidio	5,200
3 Jackson	Suspended†	Sutter and Sansome	Presidio and California	2,500
5 Fulton	^	Market and 7th Street (weekday daytime)	Fulton and 6th Avenue (weekday daytime)	8,400
5 Fulton	†^	Salesforce Transit Center (other times)	Cabrillo and La Playa (other times)	8,400
6 Hayes/Parnassus	†	Hyde and Grove (Civic Center)	Quintara and 14th Avenue	7,800
7 Haight/Noriega	^	Salesforce Transit Center	Ortega and 48th Avenue	9,400
8 Bayshore	^	Kearny and North Point	City College (Unity Plaza)	22,800
9 San Bruno	^ (Note: Uses 40-foot buses on weekdays, 60-foot buses on weekends.)	11th Street and Market (weekday daytime); Market and Steuart (Ferry Plaza) (other times)	Bayshore and Arleta (weekday daytime); McLaren School (other times)	9,700
10 Townsend	Suspended	Jackson and Fillmore (weekday daytime); Jackson and Van Ness (other times)	24th Street and Potrero	6,500
12 Folsom/Pacific		Van Ness and Pacific	Valencia and Cesar Chavez	6,300
12 Pacific	Short Route	Van Ness and Pacific	Spear & Folsom	-
14 Mission	†^	Steuart and Mission (Ferry Plaza)	Mission and San Jose (Daly City)	24,900
15 Bayview Hunters Point Express		Sutter and Sansome	Palou and 3rd Street	N/A
18 46th Avenue		Legion of Honor (daytime); 33rd Avenue and Geary (evening)	19th Avenue and Buckingham Way	3,200
19 Polk		Beach and Polk (Aquatic Park)	Galvez and Robinson	6,900
21 Hayes	N †	Steuart and Market (Ferry Plaza)	Fulton and Shrader (weekday daytime); Fulton and 8th Avenue (other times)	6,600
22 Fillmore	†	Fillmore and Bay	Mission Bay North and Third Street	16,000
23 Monterey		Palou and Third Street	Great Highway and Sloat (San Francisco Zoo)	3,800
24 Divisadero	†	Jackson and Webster	Third Street and Palou	12,000
25 Treasure Island		Salesforce Transit Center	Avenue H and 13th Street (Treasure Island)	2,800
27 Bryant	M	Pacific and Van Ness	24th Street Mission station	6,200
28 19th Avenue		Powell and Beach (Fisherman's Wharf)	Daly City station	11,700
29 Sunset		Bowley and Lincoln (The Presidio) (daytime); 25th Avenue and California (evening)	Fitzgerald and Keith	17,500
30 Stockton	†^	Townsend and 4th Street	Crissy Field in The Presidio (daytime); Divisadero and Chestnut (evening); Van Ness and North Point (some trips - as 30^{S})	20,400
31 Balboa	M †	Cyril Magnin and Market Street	Cabrillo and La Playa	8,800
33 Ashbury/18th Street	†	Sacramento and Cherry (daytime); Arguello and California (evening)	25th Street and Potrero	5,700
35 Eureka	M ♦	Castro station	Glen Park station	1,100
36 Teresita	M ♦	Forest Hill station	Valencia and Mission	1,500
37 Corbett	♦	Masonic and Haight	Parkridge and Burnett	2,200
38 Geary	^	Salesforce Transit Center	32nd Avenue and Balboa (daytime); Fort Miley Hospital (daytime); 48th Avenue and Point Lobos (evening)	21,500
39 Coit	♦	North Point and Stockton	Coit Tower	500
41 Union	N †	Main and Howard	Lyon and Greenwich	3,500
43 Masonic		Marina and Laguna (Fort Mason)	Munich and Geneva	12,600
44 O'Shaughnessy		6th Avenue and California	Hudson and Third Street	15,500
45 Union/Stockton	†	Townsend and 4th Street	Lyon and Greenwich	10,000
47 Van Ness	N	Powell and Beach	Townsend and 4th Street	11,900
48 Quintara/24th Street		22nd Street and Iowa	Great Highway and Rivera	7,600
49 Van Ness/Mission	^	Van Ness and North Point	City College (Unity Plaza)	25,000
52 Excelsior	♦	Forest Hill station	Dublin and La Grande	2,000
54 Felton		Newhall and Hudson	Daly City station	6,800
55 Dogpatch		16th Street Mission station	20th Street and 3rd Street	1,900
56 Rutland	M ♦	Visitacion Valley Middle School	Thomas Mellon Circle (daytime); Arleta and Bayshore (evening)	400
57 Parkmerced		West Portal station	Daly City station	2,100
58 Lake Merced		Stonestown Galleria	Mission and San Jose	N/A
66 Quintara	♦	9th Avenue and Judah	Vicente and 30th Avenue	800
67 Bernal Heights	♦	24th Street Mission station	Ellsworth and Crescent	1,400
88 BART Shuttle	N	Balboa Park station	Sickles and Alemany (AM); Mission and Sickles (PM)	400

== Rapid bus lines ==
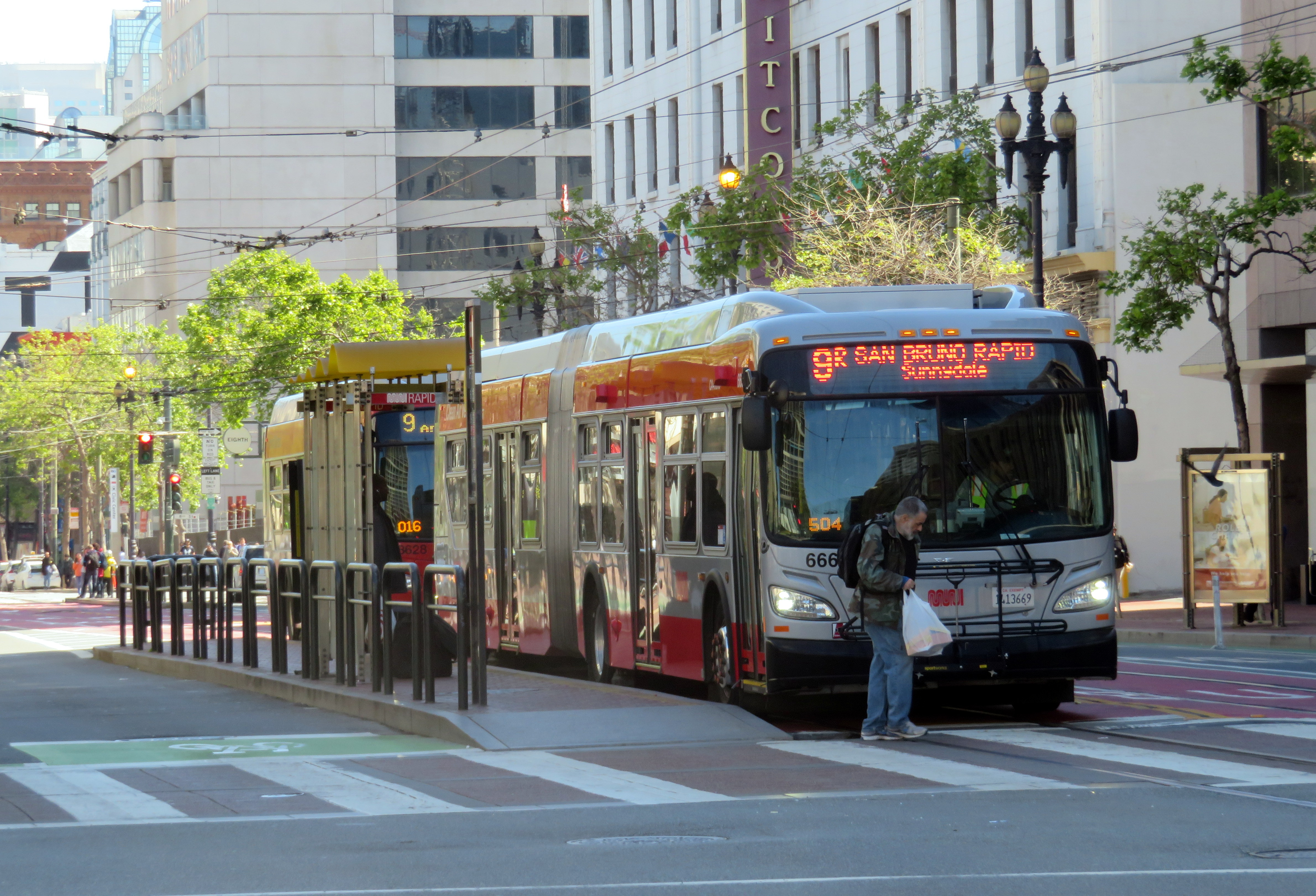
A route 9R bus on Market Street in 2019

On five high-ridership corridors, local buses are supplemented with rapid buses with limited stops. The Rapid routes largely follow the route of the local buses, with some variations; at times when the 5R and 9R operate, the 5 and 9 are cut back to a shorter route. The 5R, 9R, and 28R operate only on weekdays until 7pm; the 14R and 38R operate every day until 7pm.

Muni rapid bus lines
Route	Note	Inbound terminal	Outbound terminal	Ridership
5R Fulton Rapid	†^	Salesforce Transit Center	Cabrillo and La Playa	12,900
9R San Bruno Rapid	^	Main and Mission	Sunnydale and McLaren School	11,700
14R Mission Rapid	^	Mission and Main	Daly City station	18,900
28R 19th Avenue Rapid	M	California and 6th Avenue	Daly City station	4,500
38R Geary Rapid	^	Salesforce Transit Center	Point Lobos and 48th Avenue	29,500

== Express bus lines ==
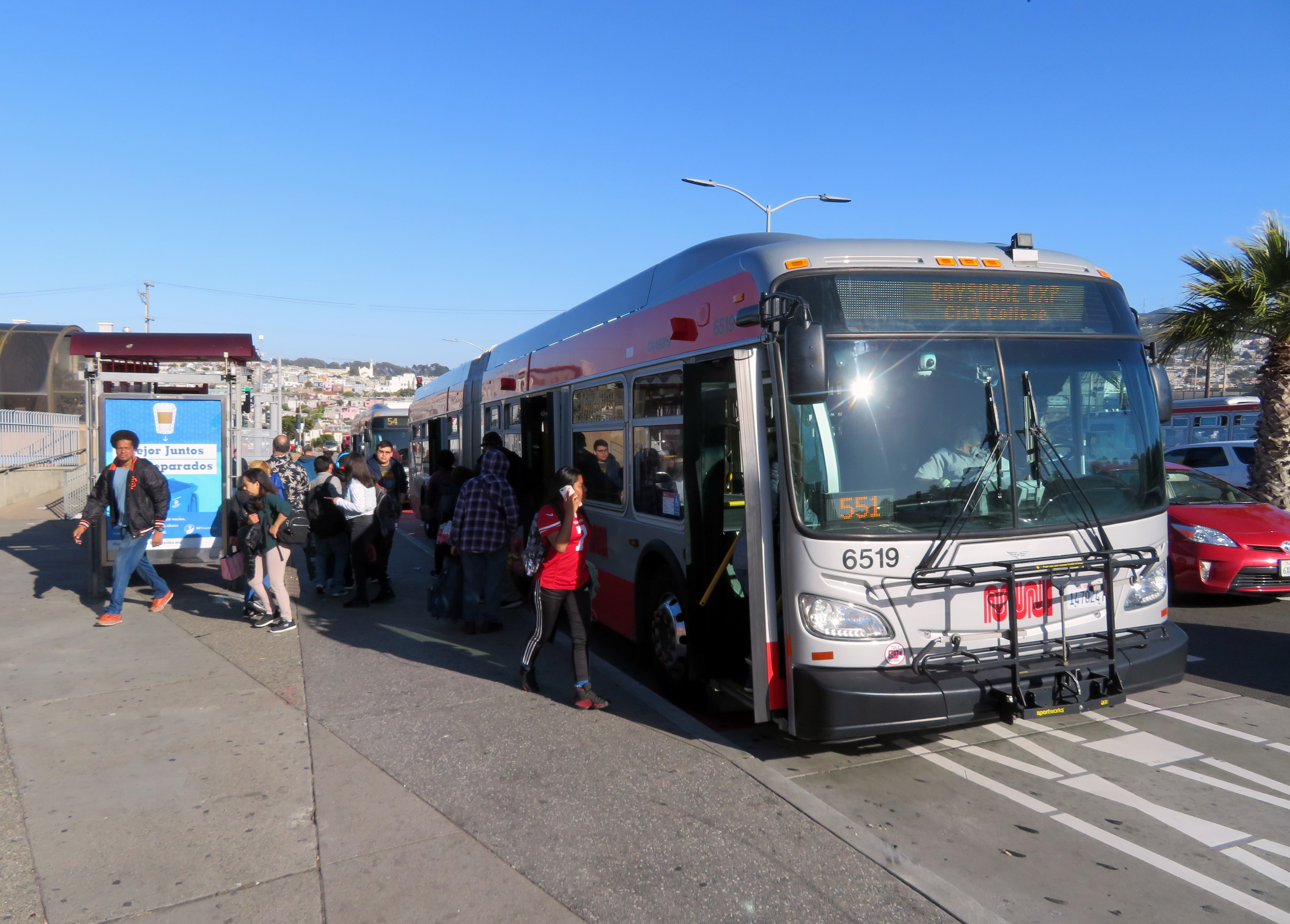
A route 8BX bus at Balboa Park station

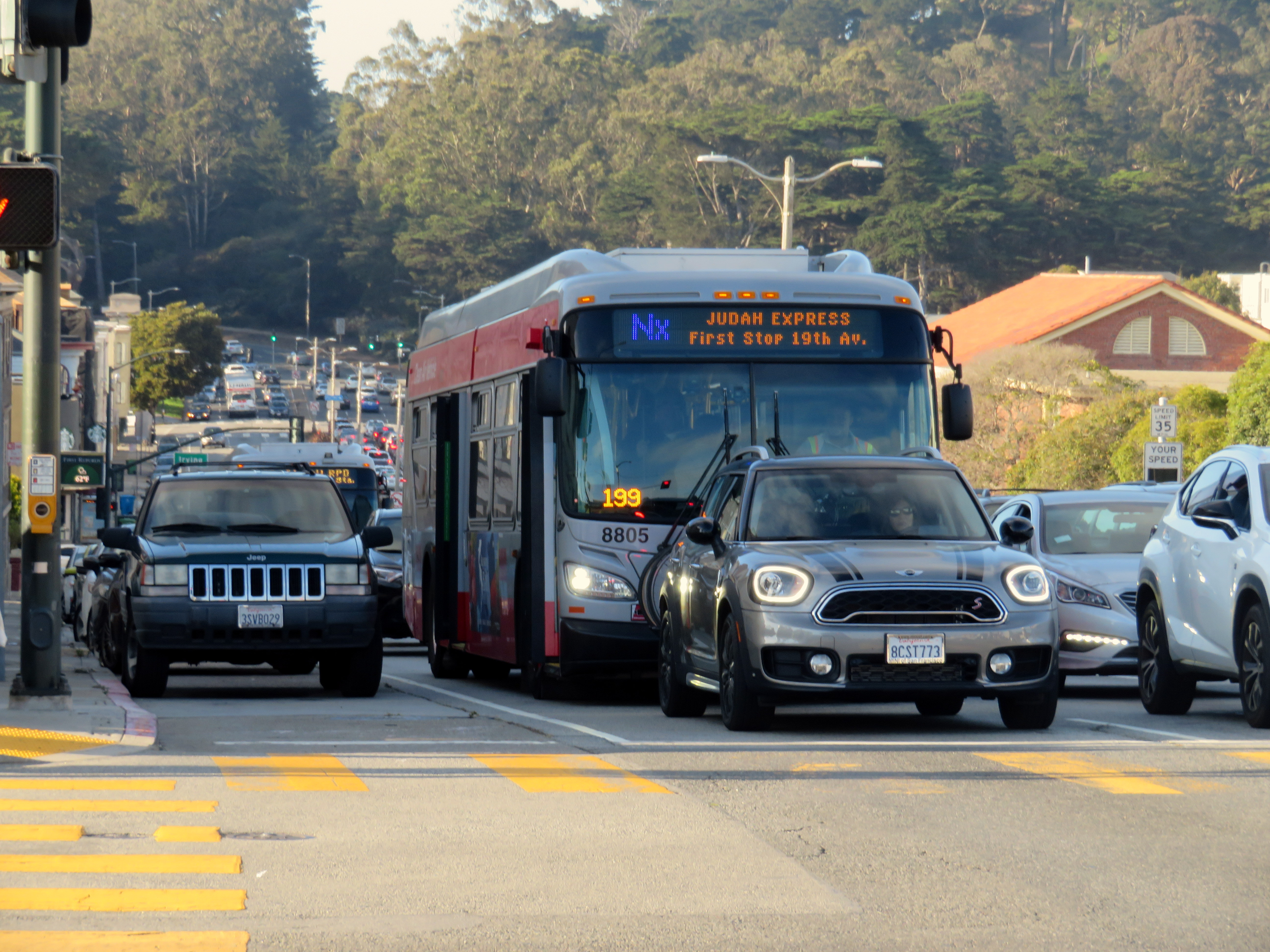
A route N^{x} bus on 19th Avenue in 2018

Muni operates several types of express routes. Twelve routes operate between outer neighborhoods and downtown. The local sections in the outer neighborhoods overlap with local routes of the same number, while the non-stop express sections operate on expressways or major arterials. They operate only during weekday peak hours, with service only in the peak direction. Buses in the opposite direction run deadhead except for the 8AX and 8BX, which are paired with the local route 8 in the non-peak direction. Eight of the express routes are paired into 'A' and 'B' types, which have different local segments on the same corridor. All express routes except routes 1X, 8AX, 8BX, 30X, and 78X were suspended during the COVID-19 pandemic.

Muni express bus lines
Route	Note	Inbound terminal	Outbound terminal	Ridership
1X California Express	^	Davis and Pine (mornings); Sacramento and Drumm (evenings)	Geary and 33rd Avenue	N/A
1AX California 'A' Express	N ^	Davis and Pine	Geary and 33rd Avenue	1,200
1BX California 'B' Express	N ^	Davis and Pine	California and 6th Avenue	1,500
7X Noriega Express	N ^	Market and Steuart (AM); Main and Market (PM)	Ortega and 48th Avenue	1,600
8AX Bayshore 'A' Express	^	Kearny and Pacific	Geneva and Schwerin	5,800
8BX Bayshore 'B' Express	^	Kearny and North Point	City College (Unity Plaza)	5,600
14X Mission Express	N ^	Steuart and Mission (Ferry Plaza)	Mission and San Jose	4,200
30X Marina Express	^	Howard and Spear	Beach and Divisadero	2,000
31AX Balboa 'A' Express	N	Davis and Pine	Cabrillo and La Playa	1,100
31BX Balboa 'B' Express	N	Davis and Pine	Balboa and Park Presidio	900
38AX Geary 'A' Express	N	Davis and Pine	Point Lobos and 48th Avenue	900
38BX Geary 'B' Express	N	Davis and Pine	Geary and 25th Avenue	1,000
N^{x} Judah Express	N	Bush and Montgomery (AM); Sutter and Sansome (PM)	Judah and 48th Avenue	1,300

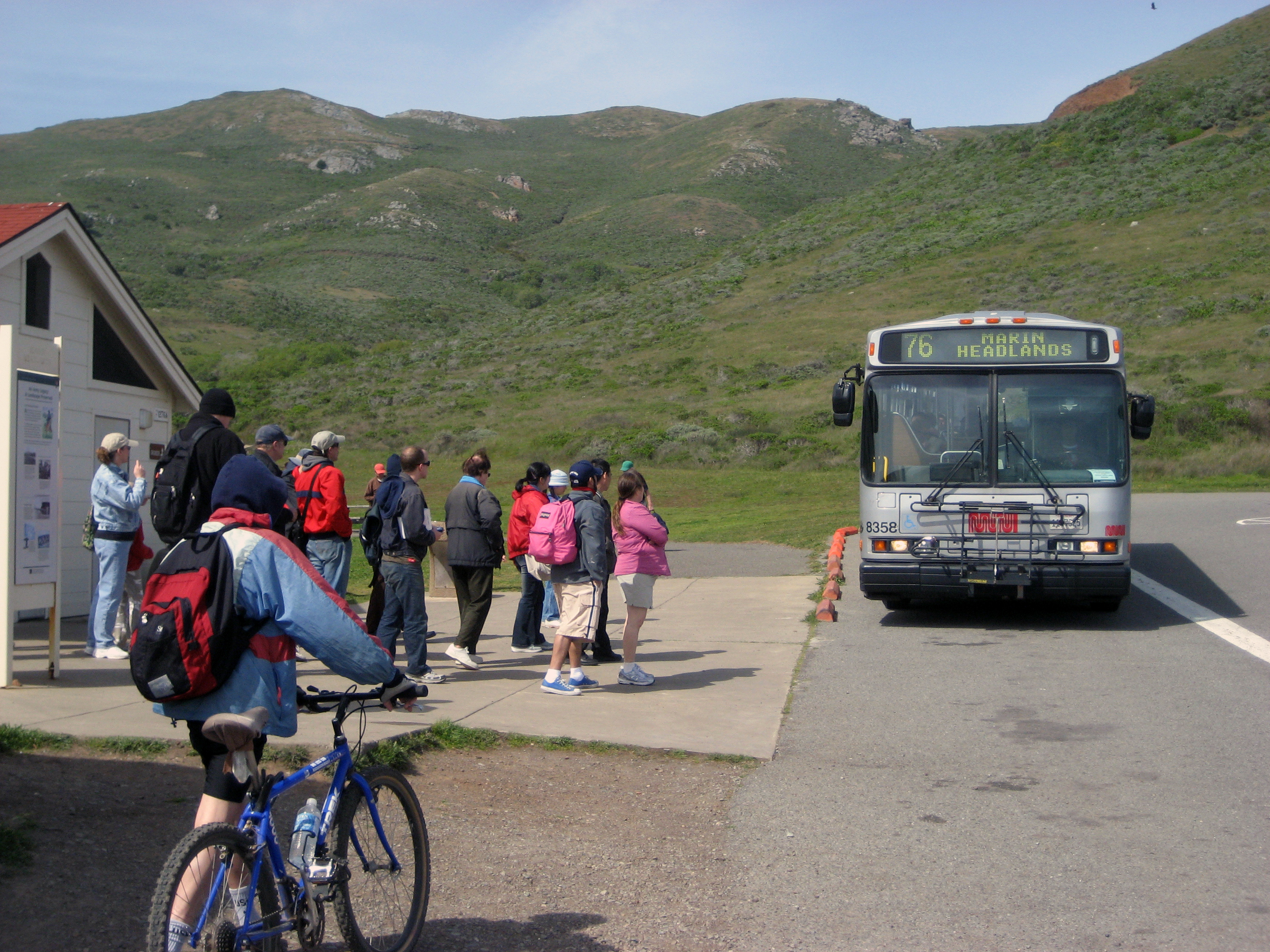
A route 76 bus (renamed 76X in 2012) at the Rodeo Beach parking lot in the Marin Headlands in 2007

Three express routes provide specialized service. The 76X, which runs only on weekends and holidays, provides service to recreational and tourist areas in the Marin Headlands. The 78X and 79X provide service to the Chase Center; they run only before and after events at the arena.

Muni express bus lines with special service
Route	Note	Inbound terminal	Outbound terminal
76X Marin Headlands Express	N	Sutter and Sansome	Fort Cronkhite (Marin Headlands)
78X 16th Street Arena Express	N ^	Chase Center	16th Street Mission station
79X Van Ness Arena Express	N	Chase Center	Van Ness and North Point

Two additional routes provide shorter-distance express service between the Caltrain commuter rail terminal at 4th and King station and business areas near Market Street. Like the outer express routes, they operate only at peak hours. The 81X and 82X operate only in the peak direction (the 81X operates only in the morning peak).

Muni Caltrain express bus lines
Route	Note	Inbound terminal	Outbound terminal	Ridership
81X Caltrain Express	N	Beale and Howard	Townsend and 4th Street	100
82X Levi Plaza Express	N	Sansome and Filbert (Levi's Plaza)	Townsend and 4th Street	500

== Owl bus lines ==
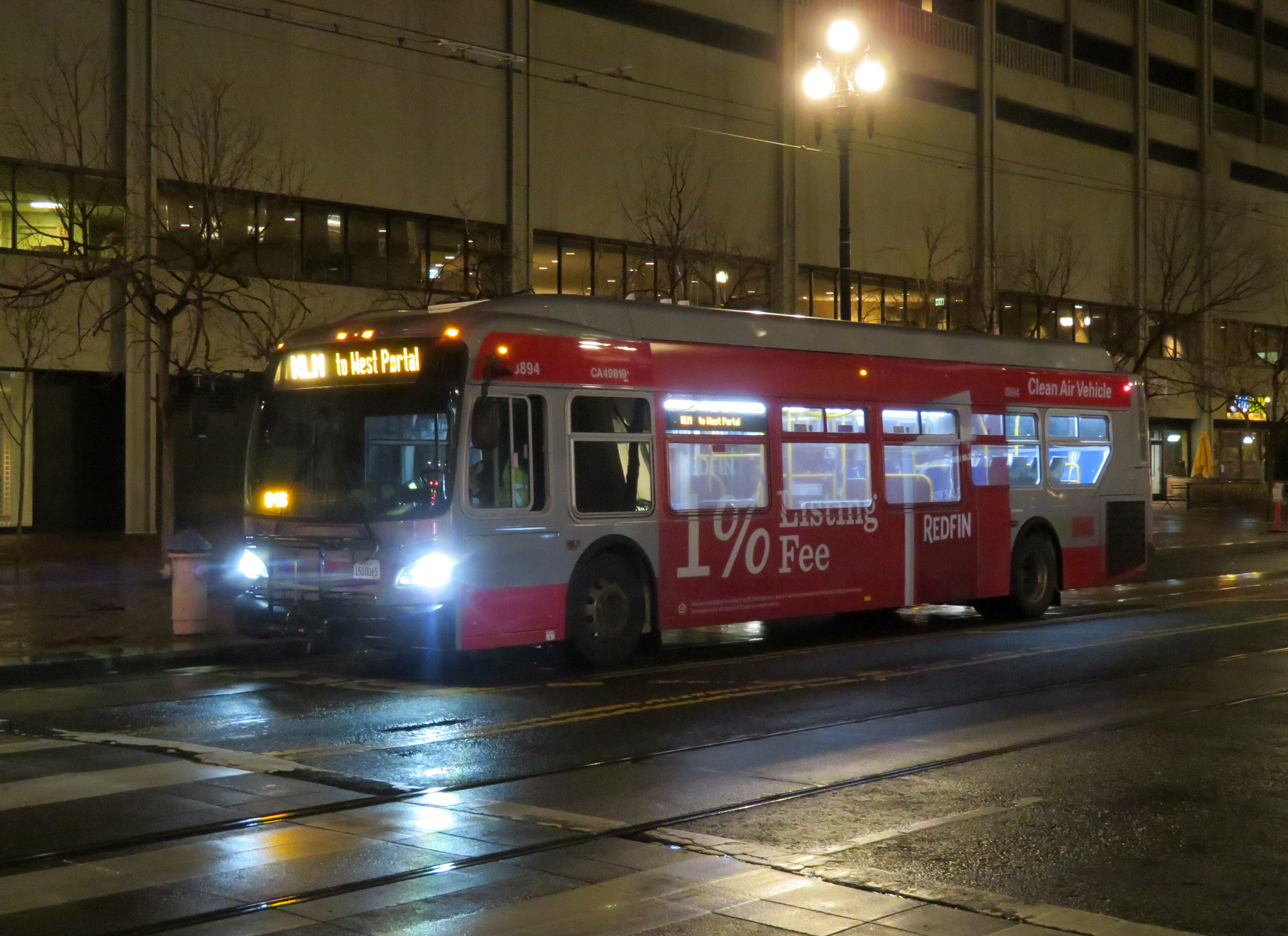
A route K Owl bus on Market Street in 2019

Owl routes provide night bus service from 1am to 5am daily (including holidays) as a part of the Bay Area's All Nighter network.

The 90 Owl route is a combination of the daytime 47 Van Ness and 9 San Bruno routes, while the 91 Owl route is a combination of the daytime K Ingleside, 8 Bayshore, T Third, 30 Stockton, and 28 19th Avenue routes. The 5 Fulton, 24 Divisadero, 44 O'Shaughnessy, and 48 Quintara-24th Street Owl routes are truncated from their daytime counterparts.

Route 714 is part of the Early Bird Express system, which provides service while BART performs seismic retrofit earthquake work in the Transbay Tube. It runs a limited number of trips during the early morning between 4am and 5am, while BART is closed.

The K, L, and N Owl motor coaches replace daytime light rail service and run on surface streets, making local stops, rather than in the Market Street subway, Twin Peaks Tunnel, and Sunset Tunnel. The L Owl also covers the route of the daytime F-Market line. The L and N Owl buses run all night, while the K Owl runs only a small number of trips in the early morning and just after the subway closes.

Muni owl bus lines
Route	Note	Inbound terminal	Outbound terminal
5 Fulton	†	Jones and McAllister	Cabrillo and La Playa
14 Mission	†	Steuart and Mission	Mission and San Jose
22 Fillmore	†	Fillmore and Bay	Mission Bay North and Third Street
24 Divisadero	†	Divisadero and Sutter	Cortland and Bayshore
25 Treasure Island		Salesforce Transit Center	13th and Gateview (Treasure Island)
38 Geary		Salesforce Transit Center	Point Lobos and 48th Avenue
44 O'Shaughnessy		Glen Park BART	Hudson and Newhall
48 24th Street		22nd Street and Iowa	Castro and 24th Street
90 San Bruno Owl		Van Ness and North Point	San Bruno and Bayshore
91 Third Street/19th Avenue Owl		Holloway and 19th Avenue	West Portal station
714 BART Early Bird	^	Salesforce Transit Center	Daly City station
K Owl	N	Steuart and Mission	Balboa Park station
L Owl		Jones and Beach	Wawona and 46th Avenue
N Owl		4th Street and Townsend	Ocean Beach

== Early morning lines ==
In addition to the Owl service, buses normally provide weekend service along all Muni Metro lines from 5am until rail service begins (6am on Saturdays, 8am on Sundays) to allow for overnight maintenance work in the subway. The K, L, and N Bus routes differ slightly from the nightly Owl routes and do not make local stops along their surface street detours, instead stopping only at stops used by the normal L and N daytime light rail routes. Several of the early morning routes are suspended, while the L bus operates the same shortened route as the daytime bus.

Muni early morning streetcar lines
Route	Note	Inbound terminal	Outbound terminal
J Church Bus		Ferry Plaza (Embarcadero station)	Balboa Park station
K Ingleside Bus		Ferry Plaza (Embarcadero station)	Balboa Park station
L Taraval Bus	M	West Portal station	Wawona and 46th Avenue
M Ocean View Bus	Only if needed	West Portal station	San Jose and Geneva (Balboa Park)
N Judah Bus		Townsend and 5th Street	Ocean Beach
T Third Street Bus		Bayshore and Sunnydale	Stockton and Washington (Chinatown station)
