= Right Of Way/Eucalyptus station =

Light rail stop in San Francisco, California, US

Right Of Way/Eucalyptus
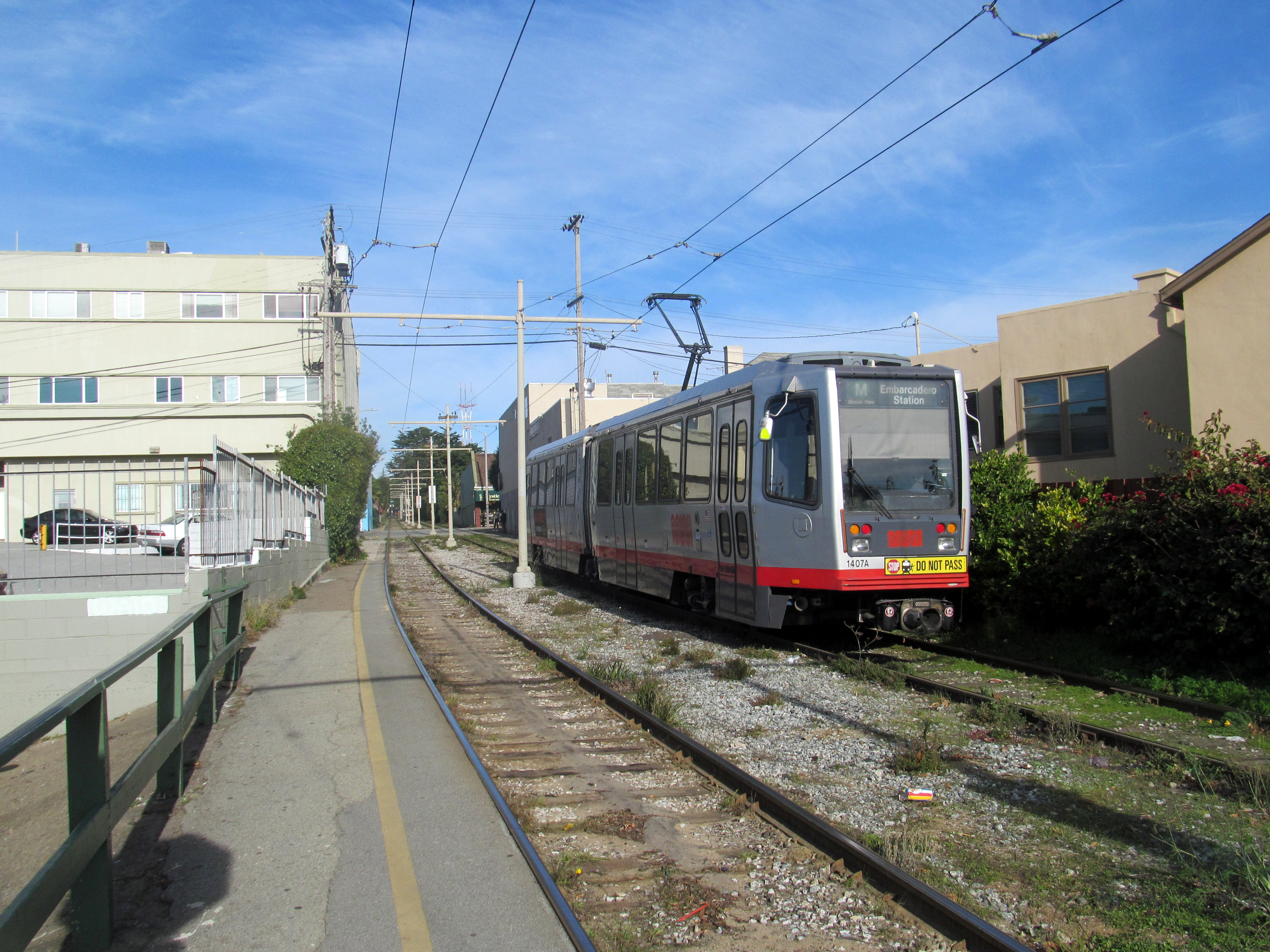
- An inbound train passing the outbound platform in December 2017

General information
- Location: Muni right-of-way at Eucalyptus Drive; San Francisco, California
- Coordinates: 37°43′52″N 122°28′28″W
- Platforms: 2 side platforms
- Tracks: 2
- Connections: Muni: 57

Construction
- Accessible: No

History
- Opened: October 6, 1925

Services
Preceding station	Muni	Following station
Stonestown Galleria toward San Jose and Geneva (Balboa Park)	M Ocean View	Right Of Way/Ocean toward Embarcadero
Location

Right Of Way/Eucalyptus station is a light rail stop on the Muni Metro M Ocean View line, located in the Merced Manor neighborhood of San Francisco, California. It opened in 1925 with the first phase of the line. The station is located where the line's private right-of-way crosses Eucalyptus Drive, with narrow side platforms located on the near side of the grade crossing. The southbound platform is across the tracks from the northbound platform of Right Of Way/Ocean station. The stop is not accessible to people with disabilities.

The stop is also served by bus route 57 plus the M Bus which provides service along the M Ocean View line during the early morning when trains do not operate.
