= Stonestown Galleria station =

Muni Metro light rail station in San Francisco

Stonestown
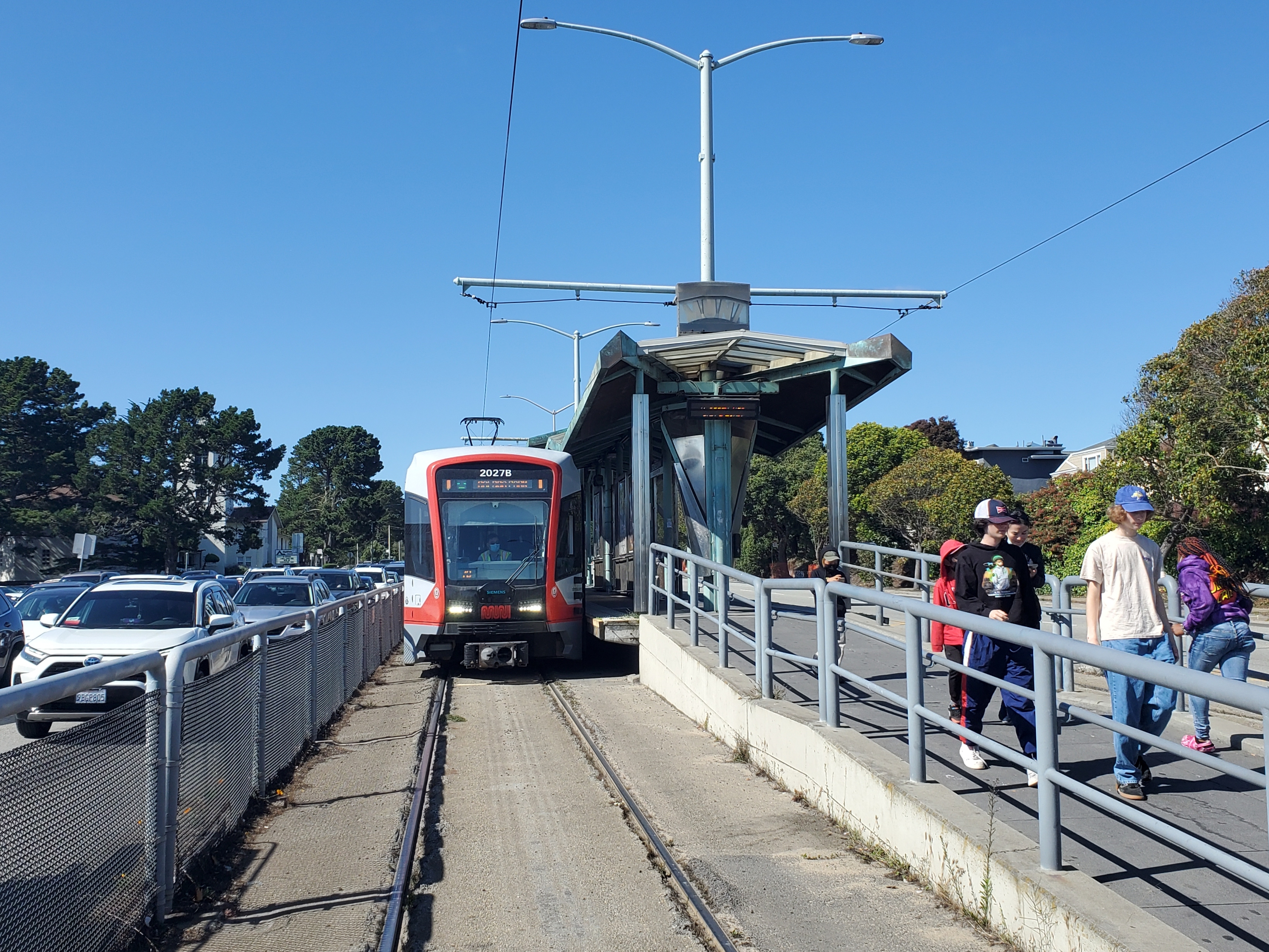
- An outbound train at Stonestown Galleria station in 2022

General information
- Other names: Stonestown/Lakeside/Winston
- Location: 19th Avenue at Winston Drive; San Francisco, California
- Coordinates: 37°43′38″N 122°28′29″W
- Platforms: 1 island platform
- Tracks: 2
- Connections: Muni: 18, 28, 28R, 29, 57, 91 Owl; SamTrans: 122

Construction
- Accessible: Yes

History
- Opened: October 6, 1925
- Rebuilt: October 23, 1993

Services
Preceding station	Muni	Following station
San Francisco State University toward San Jose and Geneva (Balboa Park)	M Ocean View	Right Of Way/Eucalyptus toward Embarcadero
Location

Stonestown station is a light rail station on the Muni Metro M Ocean View line, located in the median of 19th Avenue adjacent to Stonestown Galleria and the Lakeside neighborhood in San Francisco, California. It opened in 1925 with the first phase of the line and was rebuilt with a high-level island platform in 1993. The station is accessible to people with disabilities.

The station is also served by bus routes 18, 28, 28R (a limited-stop rapid service), 29, 57 and 91 Owl (an overnight service) plus the M Bus which provides service along the M Ocean View line during the early morning when trains do not operate. Additionally, SamTrans route 122 stops at the station.

== History ==
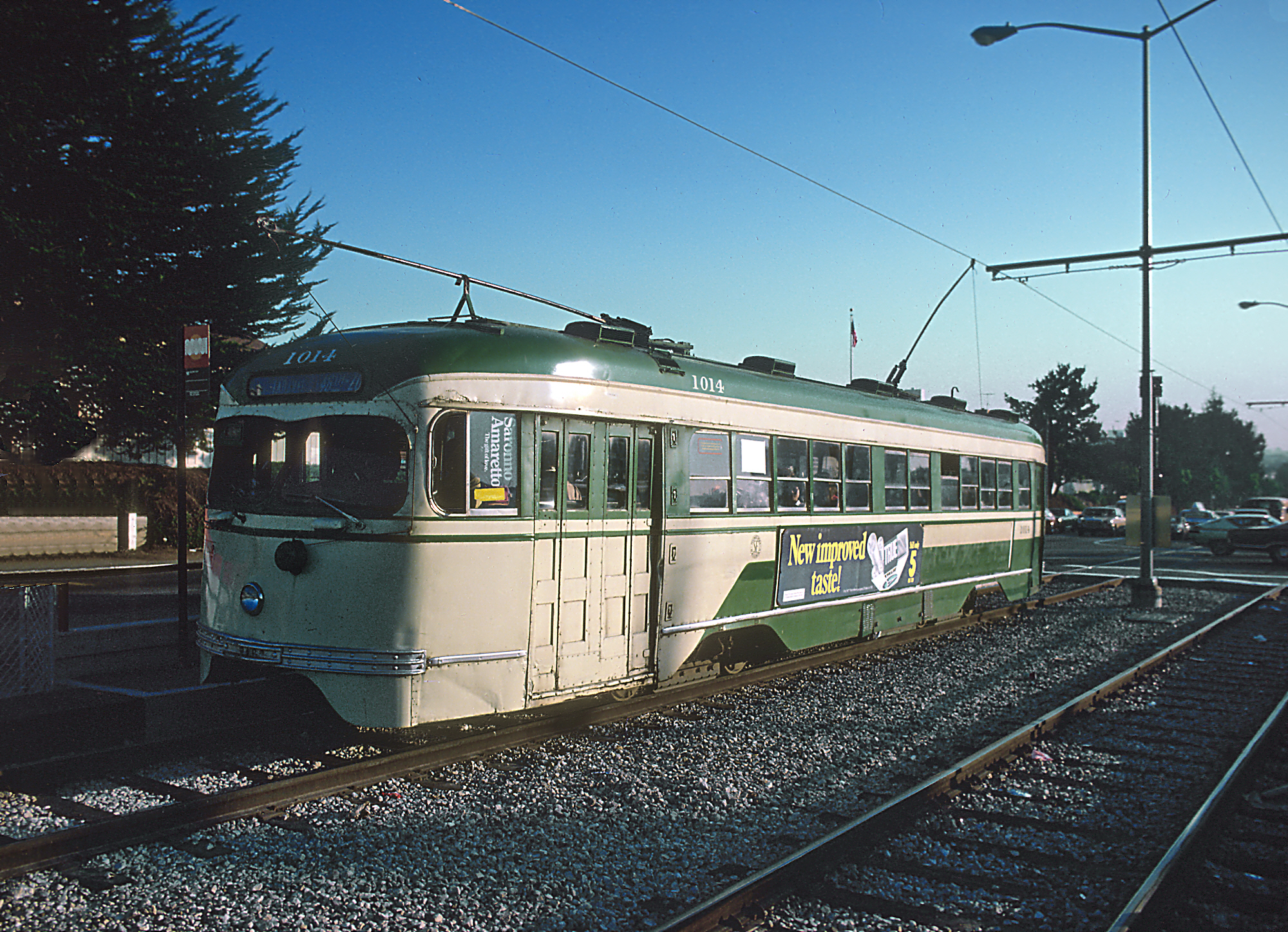
A streetcar at the stop in 1980

When the M Ocean View line opened on October 6, 1925, it ran along the west side of 19th Avenue; a second set of lanes was added later, placing the line in the road's median. Several stations with small side platforms were located along 19th Avenue, including one at Winston Drive; it became more important after the adjacent Stonestown Galleria opened in 1952.

In the early 1970s, Muni began planning an extension of the J Church line over new track to Balboa Park station, then over the M Ocean View line to the high-ridership San Francisco State University and Stonestown Galleria stations. A Final Environmental Impact Statement for the new track was released in 1983; it was opened for non-revenue moves in August 1991 and began revenue service in June 1993. Original plans called for the two existing stations to be rebuilt with high-level island platforms, and a pocket track to allow J Church trains to turn back. After objections from neighbors, the pocket track was removed from the plan.

The first phase of the 19th Ave. Platform & Trackway Improvement Project required the line to be replaced by buses south of St. Francis Circle from June 19 to October 23, 1993; the new platforms at the two stations were opened when service was restored. The second phase required full bustitution beginning on July 30, 1994; rail service was restored to Stonestown on November 19 for holiday shopping, and on the rest of the line on January 28, 1995. Some weekday J and M service was through-routed from 1995 to 1998, but full through-routing was never implemented.
