= Right Of Way/Ocean station =

Light rail stop in San Francisco, California, US

Right Of Way/Ocean
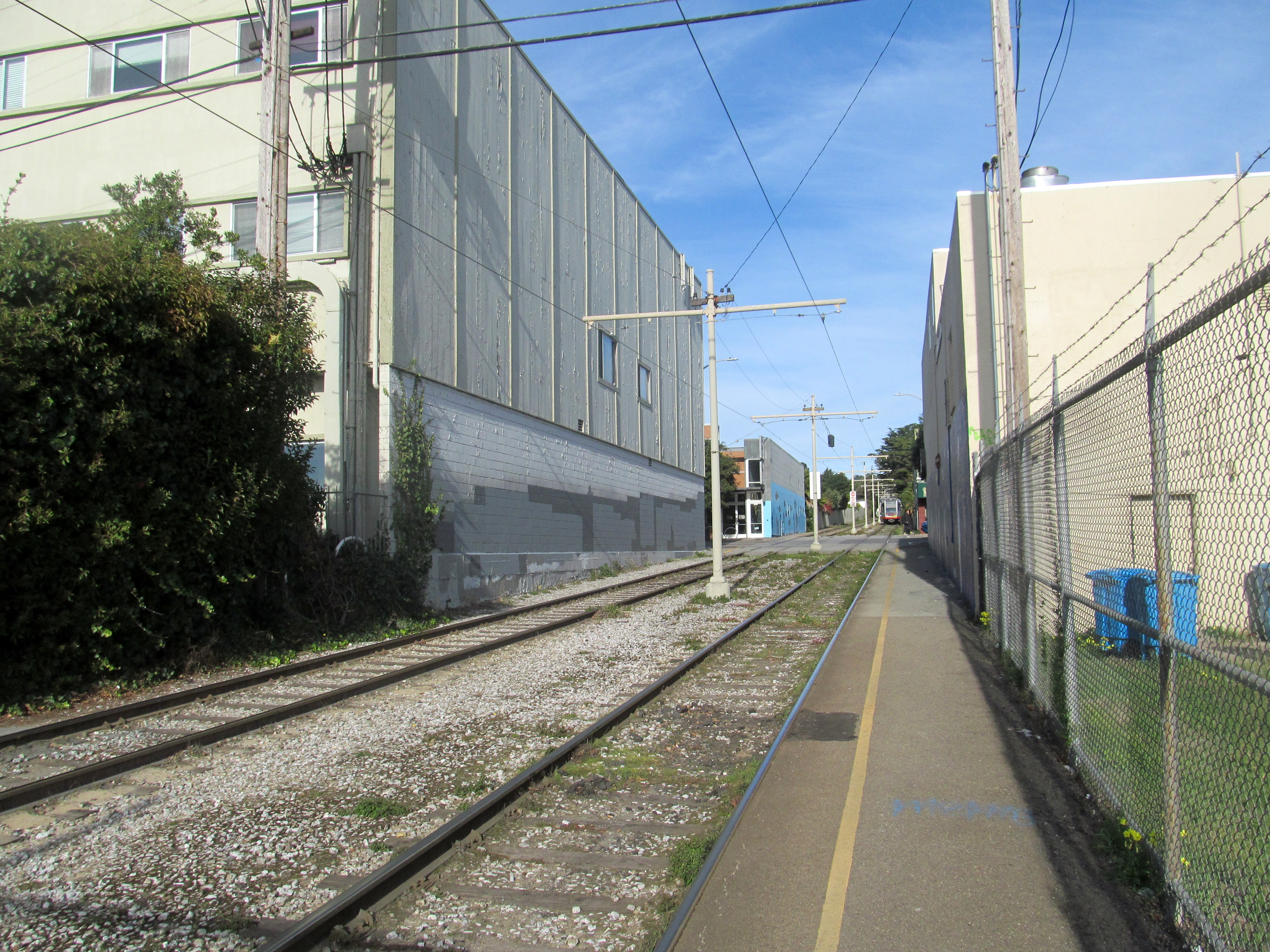
- The northbound platform at Ocean Avenue in December 2017

General information
- Location: Muni right-of-way at Ocean Avenue; San Francisco, California
- Coordinates: 37°43′54″N 122°28′26″W
- Platforms: 2 side platforms
- Tracks: 2

Construction
- Accessible: No

History
- Opened: October 6, 1925

Services
Preceding station	Muni	Following station
Right Of Way/Eucalyptus toward San Jose and Geneva (Balboa Park)	M Ocean View	St. Francis Circle toward Embarcadero
Location

Right Of Way/Ocean station is a light rail stop on the Muni Metro M Ocean View line, located in the Merced Manor neighborhood of San Francisco, California. It opened in 1925 with the first phase of the line. The station is located where the line's private right-of-way crosses Ocean Avenue, with narrow side platforms located on the near side of the grade crossing. The northbound platform is across the tracks from the southbound platform of Right Of Way/Eucalyptus station. The stop is not accessible to people with disabilities.

The stop is also served by the M Bus route which provides service along the M Ocean View line during the early morning when trains do not operate.
