= Hudson/Innes station =

Muni Metro light rail station in San Francisco

Hudson/Innes
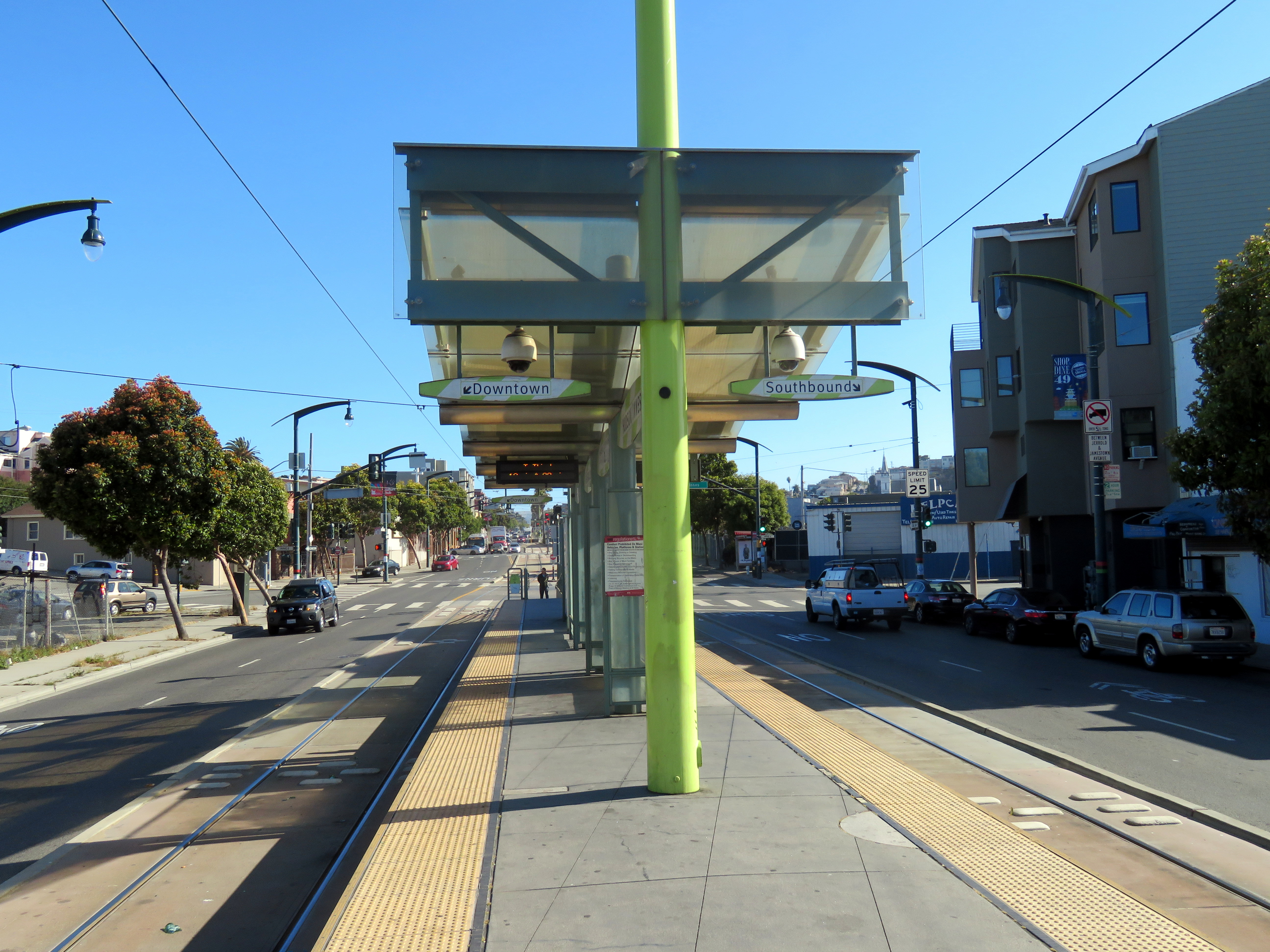
- Hudson/Innes station in June 2018

General information
- Location: Third Street between Hudson and Innes Avenues; San Francisco, California
- Coordinates: 37°44′24″N 122°23′20″W
- Platforms: 1 island platform
- Tracks: 2
- Connections: Muni: 44, 54

Construction
- Accessible: Yes

History
- Opened: January 13, 2007

Services
Preceding station	Muni	Following station
Evans toward Chinatown	T Third Street	Kirkwood/La Salle toward Sunnydale
Location

Hudson/Innes station is a light rail station on the Muni Metro T Third Street line in the Bayview neighborhood of San Francisco, California. The station opened with the T Third Street line on January 13, 2007. It has a single island platform located in the median of Third Street between Hudson Avenue and Innes Avenue, with access from crosswalks at both streets.

The station is also served by bus routes 44 and 54, plus the T Bus and 91 Owl bus routes, which provide service along the T Third Street line during the early morning and late night hours respectively when trains do not operate.
