= Oakdale/Palou station =

Muni Metro light rail station in San Francisco

Oakdale/Palou
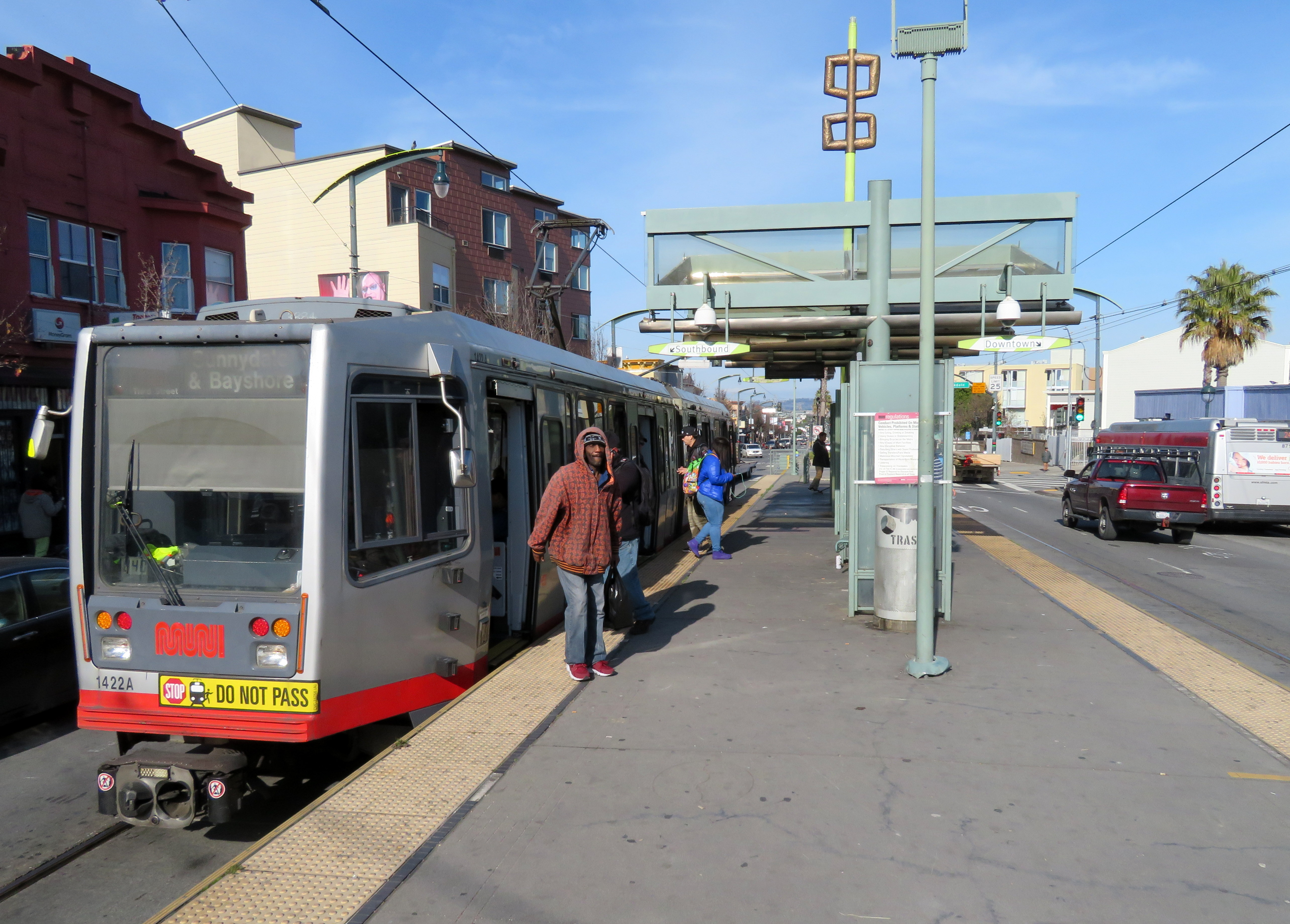
- A southbound train at Oakdale/Palou station in 2018

General information
- Other names: Opera House
- Location: Third Street between Oakdale and Palou Avenues; San Francisco, California
- Coordinates: 37°44′3.53″N 122°23′27.1″W
- Platforms: 1 island platform
- Tracks: 2
- Connections: Muni: 15, 23, 24, 44, 54

Construction
- Accessible: Yes

History
- Opened: January 13, 2007

Services
Preceding station	Muni	Following station
Kirkwood/La Salle toward Chinatown	T Third Street	Revere/Shafter toward Sunnydale
Location

Oakdale/Palou station (also signed as Opera House) is a light rail station on the Muni Metro T Third Street line in the Bayview neighborhood of San Francisco, California. The station opened with the T Third Street line on January 13, 2007. It has a single island platform located in the median of Third Street between Oakdale Avenue and Palou Avenue, with access from crosswalks at both streets.

The station is also served by bus routes 15, 23, 24, 44 and 54, plus the T Bus and 91 Owl bus routes, which provide service along the T Third Street line during the early morning and late night hours respectively when trains do not operate.
