= Mercy High School (San Francisco) =

Location
- 3250 19th Avenue; San Francisco, California 94132; United States; 37.729419°N 122.473623°W

Information
- Type: Private, All-Female
- Religious affiliations: Roman Catholic; Sisters of Mercy
- Established: 1952
- Founder: Catherine McAuley
- Closed: 2020
- Grades: 9-12
- Campus size: 6 acres (24,000 m^{2})
- Colors: Red and White
- Athletics conference: West Bay Athletic League
- Mascot: Skipper and Flipper the Dolphin
- Team name: Skippers
- Accreditation: Western Association of Schools and Colleges
- Publication: ANCHOR (formerly MERCY NEWS)
- Website: www.mercyhs.org

Mercy High School was a Catholic all-girls college-preparatory high school in San Francisco, California. It was a part of the Roman Catholic Archdiocese of San Francisco, and was sponsored by the Sisters of Mercy in Dublin, Ireland. The campus was located on 19th Avenue, near San Francisco State University, and included a multipurpose pavilion, which was built and dedicated to Catherine McAuley in 2001. The school permanently closed in the summer of 2020 and was replaced by the Chinese American International School.

== History ==
In 1855, Mother Baptist Russell and the Sisters of Mercy opened a night school for adults on Vallejo Street in San Francisco.

Circa 1949, the then-auxiliary bishop of the Archdiocese of San Francisco James Thomas O'Dowd, who was the Archdiocesan Superintendent of Schools, requested that the Sisters of Mercy provide a secondary school for the Catholic girls in the Sunset, Lakeside, and Park Merced districts. As a result, Mercy High School was opened on September 3, 1952 with a class of 199 freshmen in a partially completed building. Nearly two years later, the original building was completed in 1954.

On June 11, 1956, a class of 173 seniors received diplomas and became the first graduating class of Mercy High School. The achievement of Mercy's first graduating class placed the high school on the list of secondary schools accredited by the University of California. In 1958, Mercy High School became a charter member among schools accredited by the Western Catholic Educational Association. In 1964, it was accredited by the newly formed Secondary Commission of the Western Association of Schools and Colleges. The school was also a member of the National Catholic Educational Association.

In January 2020, the school announced that it would close at the end of the 2019–2020 school year, citing decreased enrollment figures, a shrinking endowment, and the high cost of living in San Francisco that made private school tuition difficult to afford for many families.

== Academics ==
Mercy offered a four-year college preparatory program, which included advanced placement and honors courses in English, mathematics, science, foreign language, and history. Religious education classes were mandatory.

Mercy's student government program also received the highest award from the California Association of Student Councils.

== Notable alumnae ==
- Kimberly Guilfoyle, Fox News personality
- Patricia Ziegler, founder of Banana Republic
- Kristina Wong, performer, artist, actor, film maker

== See also ==
- San Francisco County high schools
