= 24 Divisadero =

Trolleybus line in San Francisco, California

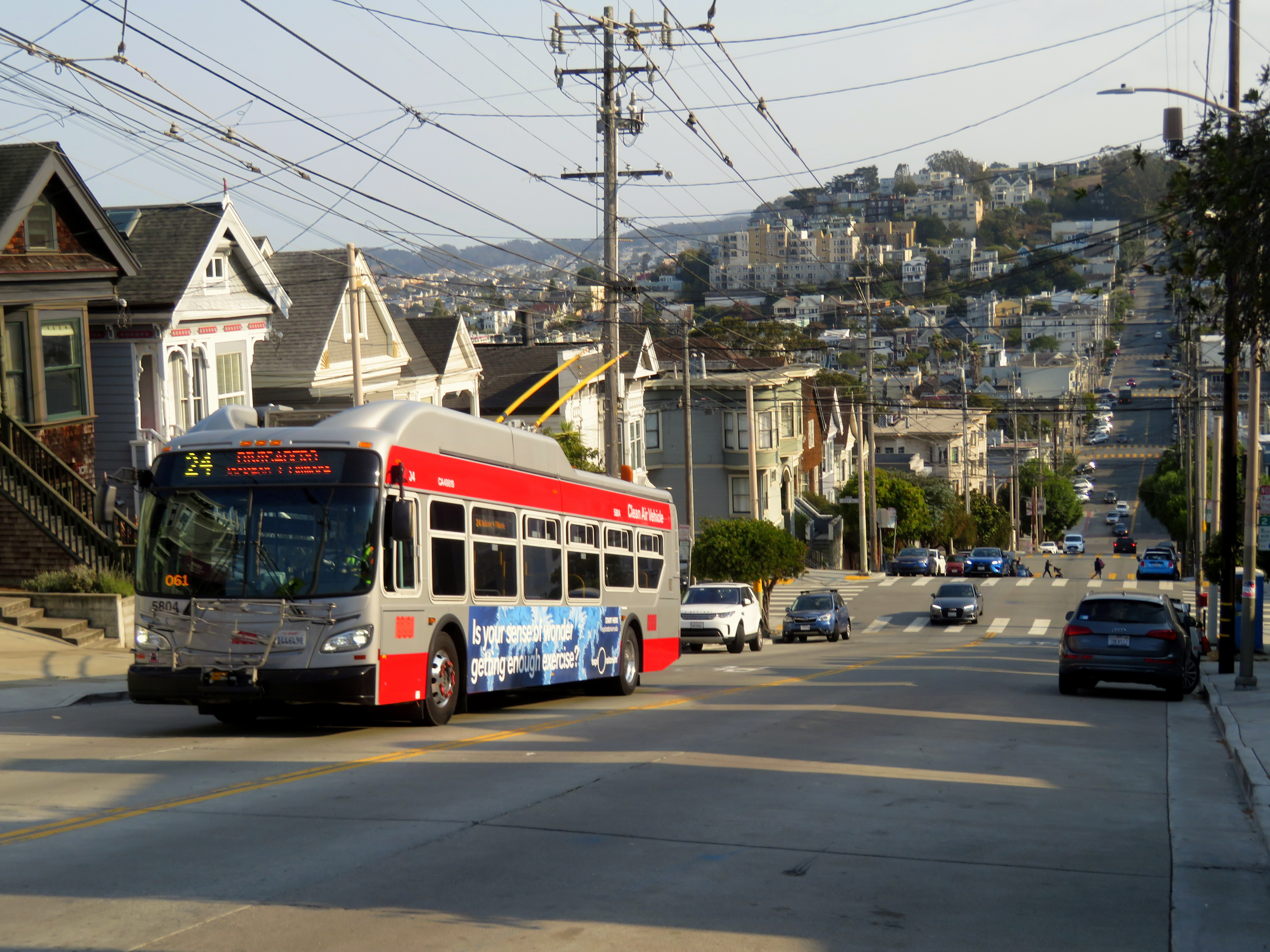
- A route 24 trolleybus on Castro Street atop Dolores Heights, September 2020

Overview
- System: Muni trolleybus network
- Operator: San Francisco Municipal Railway
- Vehicle: New Flyer XT40
- Began service: April 6, 1941
- Predecessors: Castro Street Cable

Route
- Locale: San Francisco, California
- Start: Jackson and Webster; Cortland and Bayshore (Owl)
- Via: Divisadero St, Castro St, Cortland Av
- End: Third Street and Palou; Divisadero and Sutter (Owl)
- Length: 6.6 miles (10.6 km)
- Daily ridership: 12,000 (2019)
- Map: 24 Divisadero

24 Divisadero is a trolleybus line operated by the San Francisco Municipal Railway (Muni). Most of its north–south route takes it along Divisadero Street and Castro Street. It originated in 1941 as a motorbus route, taking over from streetcars of the Market Street Railway, and was converted to trolleybuses in 1983.

== Route description ==
From the northern terminus at Jackson and Webster, the route runs west to Divisadero and then turns south. It continues onto Castro Street until 26th Street, then runs on a complicated route of 26th, Noe, 30th, Mission Street, Cortland, Bayshore, Industrial, and Palou. The outbound terminus is adjacent to the Muni Metro Oakdale/Palou station on Third Street.

The 24 Divisadero runs between Hunters Point in the south and Pacific Heights in the north. The line includes the single steepest known grade on any existing trolley bus line in the world: 22.8% in the block of Noe Street between Cesar Chavez Street and 26th Street.

The route operates 24 hours with less frequent short turn Owl service overnight as part of the All Nighter network.

== History ==
As part of the Market Street Extension, steam dummy service was established by the Market Street Cable Railway between the company's powerhouse at Market and Valencia and running to Castro Street. The Market Street line was converted to cable-haulage in 1887, providing through-running to Castro and 26th Street. This was referred to as the White Line, after the streetcars' livery. After the Market Street mainline was reconstructed with electric traction following the 1906 San Francisco earthquake, Castro's cable car was retained at the outer end of the line as the company claimed the route was too steep for electric cars. Cable car service on Castro Street between 26th and 18th Streets restarted the year following the disaster. The line operated as a shuttle service.

On June 16, 1935, the Market Street Railway 24 streetcar was rerouted to operate on Divisadero between Page and Sacramento.

The 24 Divisadero bus was established on April 6, 1941 as a replacement for the Castro Street cable car.

By 1979, a Muni five-year plan for service changes proposed that the route be converted to trolleybuses and extended at its southern end to Bernal Heights. By 1981, it had become a firm plan. In January 1982, still using diesel buses at this stage, the route was extended east to Third Street, the extension from the former terminus of 26th and Castro being about 2 1/2 miles long and running via Cortland Street and Palou Avenue to the Bayview district. On August 24, 1983, route 24 was converted to trolleybuses. A route change made at that time moved the segment south of 26th Street from Church Street to Noe Street, and the new routing included the steepest grade covered by any trolleybus line in the world, 22.8% in the block of Noe Street between 26th Street and Army Street (now César Chávez Street).
