= 19th Avenue (San Francisco) =

City street in San Francisco, California

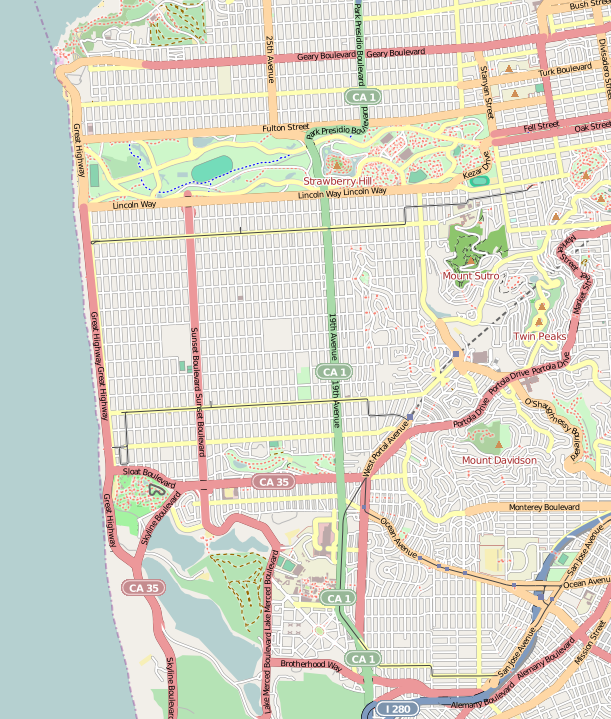
- Map displaying 19th Avenue (central green road)
- Interactive map of 19th Avenue
- Part of: SR 1 between Junipero Serra Boulevard and Golden Gate Park
- Maintained by: S.F. D.P.W., Caltrans (for the portion of SR 1)
- Nearest metro station: SF State; Stonestown Galleria; Taraval and 19th; Judah and 19th
- Coordinates: 37°45′55.12″N 122°28′38.33″W
- South end: St. Charles Avenue
- Major junctions: SR 1 south / Junipero Serra Boulevard; SR 35 / Sloat Boulevard; SR 1 north / Crossover Drive; Gap in route; Fulton Street; Geary Boulevard
- North end: North of Lake Street

19th Avenue is a north–south city street located on the West Side of San Francisco, California. It consists of two non-contiguous segments that are separated by Golden Gate Park. The southern segment is a six-lane arterial thoroughfare, mostly signed as part of California State Route 1, that goes through the southwestern part of the city. The non-contiguous northern segment is primarily a residential street through the Richmond District.

== Route description ==
=== Southern segment ===
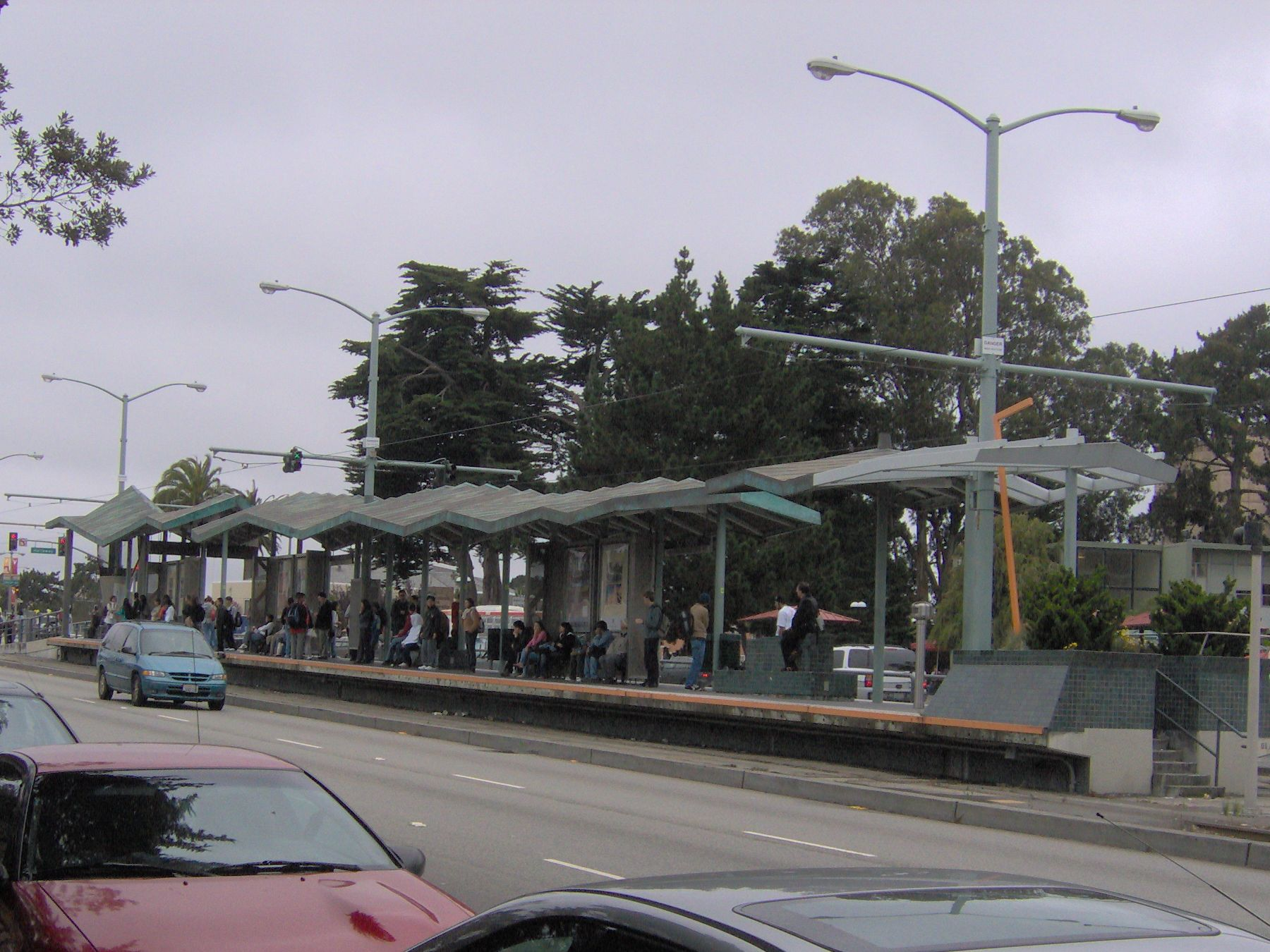
The intersection of 19th Avenue and Holloway Avenue with a Muni Metro station in the background

The southern segment of 19th Avenue begins as a northern continuation of St. Charles Avenue, a dead end street south of Randolph Street near the Ingleside neighborhood of San Francisco. 19th Avenue then proceeds northwest to Junipero Serra Boulevard. After crossing Junipero Serra, it heads north, passing San Francisco State University and Stonestown Galleria to Sloat Boulevard. The street then runs through the Sunset District to the southern edge of Golden Gate Park, where it then continues inside the park as Crossover Drive.

Despite being a city street, the avenue between Junipero Serra Boulevard and Golden Gate Park is designated as part of the State Highway 1. The portion of the avenue between Junipero Serra Boulevard and Eucalyptus Drive is also run by the Muni Metro M Ocean View light rail, providing access to Downtown. 19th Avenue is located between 18th Avenue and 20th Avenue.

=== Northern segment ===
The northern segment of 19th Avenue has its southern terminus at Fulton Street at the northern edge of Golden Gate Park. It heads north as a two-lane residential street through the Richmond District, crossing Geary Boulevard. It then ends at a cul-de-sac north of Lake Street, just short of the southern edge of the Presidio.

== Safety measures ==
State Senator Leland Yee authored a bill designating 19th Avenue as a double-penalty zone for speeding, illegally overtaking, driving under the influence, driving recklessly, seat belt violations, and other traffic offences enforced by California Highway Patrol San Francisco Division, which took effect on 1 January 2009. Previous legislative efforts were vetoed by Governor Arnold Schwarzenegger in 2006, on the grounds that double-fine zones are ineffective without necessary safety measures. In 2007, the bill failed to come to a final vote before the Senate session ended. On February 22, 2008, Yee successfully reintroduced the bill.
