= Stonestown Galleria =

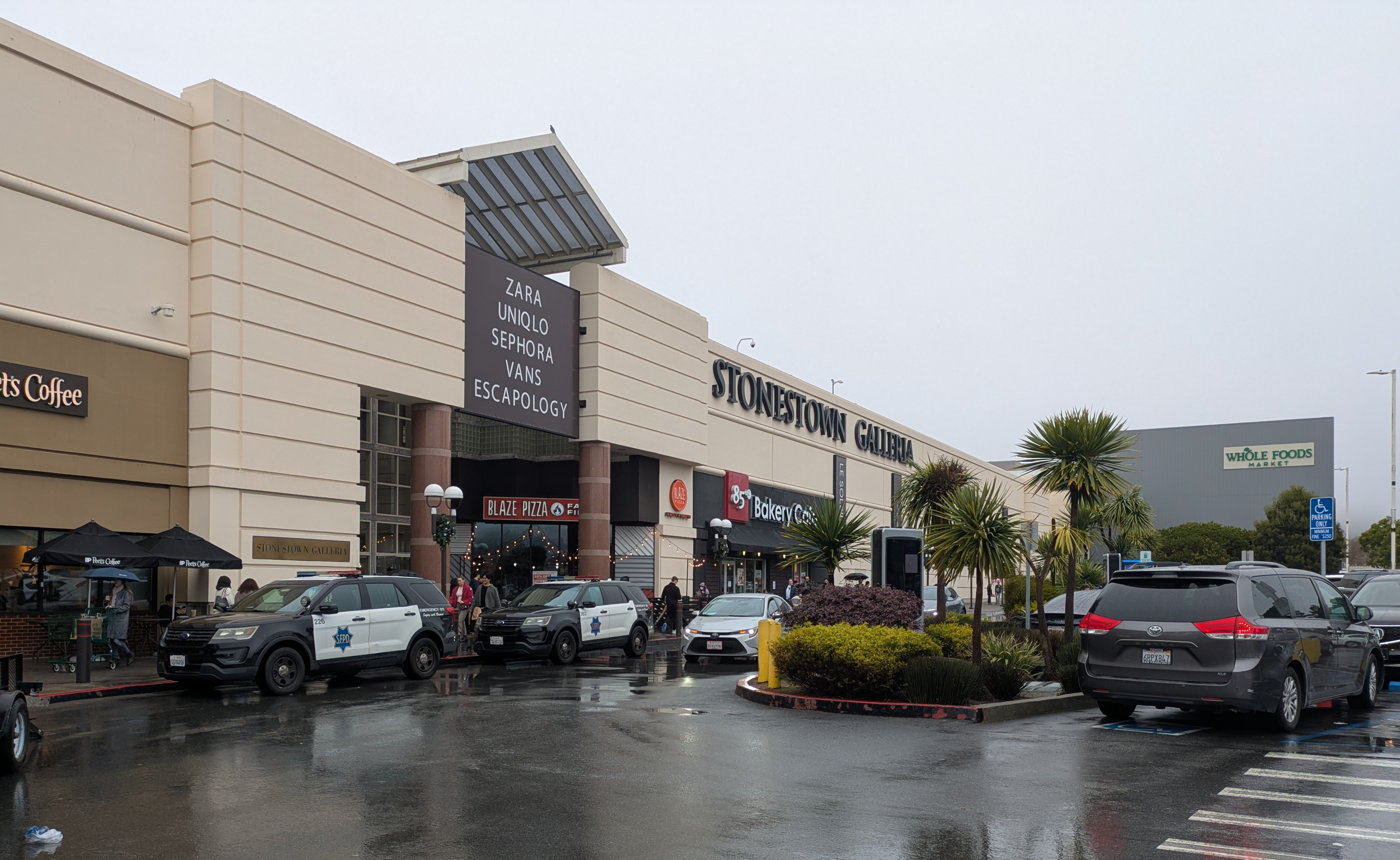
- Location: San Francisco, California
- Coordinates: 37.7282°N 122.4771°W
- Opened: July 16, 1952; 74 years ago
- Developer: Stoneson Development Corporation
- Manager: GGP
- Owner: GGP
- Num. of stores: 109
- Num. of anchor tenants: 4
- Floor area: 803,837 sq ft (74,678.9 m^{2})
- Floors: 2
- Parking: 3,700 spaces
- Public transit: Stonestown Galleria Station
- Website: stonestowngalleria.com

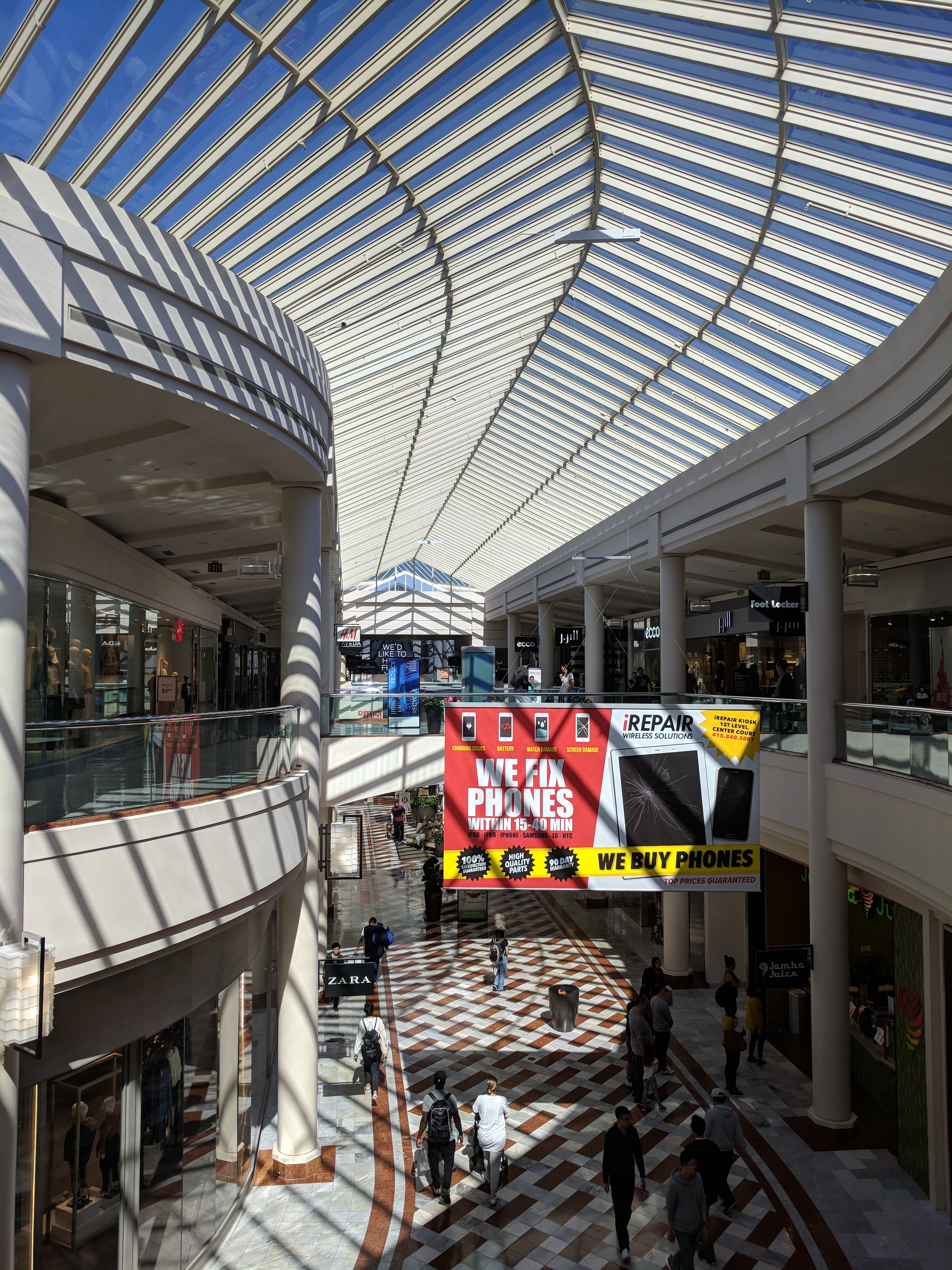
Overview of the galleria

Stonestown Galleria is a shopping mall located in San Francisco, on the West Side of the city. It is located immediately north of San Francisco State University and near the former campus of Mercy High School which closed in 2020 and Lowell High School.

Currently, the mall's anchor stores are Target, Whole Foods Market, Sports Basement, and Regal Cinemas. The hallways form a plus shape, with the former Macy's on the north side, and Target, Trader Joe's, Chase, Shake Shack and Bank of America, on the south side. There are four wings, two on level one and two on level two, with a food court on the center upper level. Marble columns and skylights follow the wings of the mall as staples of its architecture. A demolition/rebuilding project in the late 1980s added many of the current architectural features. The former Macy's anchor space was demolished in 2019 and renovated, as it now houses a Regal Cinemas, Whole Foods Market, and Sports Basement, a California chain of sporting goods stores. Brookfield Properties, the owners and managers of the mall, announced in 2021 their plans to further renovate the mall into a 'town center' under their Stonestown Reimagined vision.

== History ==
Stonestown Galleria, originally called Stonestown Shopping Center, was built in 1952 by the Stoneson brothers. It was built in the Lakeside neighborhood, bordering Lake Merced, along with apartments that could house 3,000 to 3,500 people.

The anchor store, The Emporium, opened on July 16, 1952. Other early businesses included Walgreens, Butler Brothers Department Stores, Gallenkamp Shoes, the Red Chimney restaurant and Woolworth's. There were stores for local residents, including a grocery store, a bakery, and movie theaters.

Stoneson Brothers also developed the Stoneridge Shopping Center in Pleasanton and Lakeside Village.

In 1970, a United Artists Cinema opened in what is now the parking lot behind the Stonestown Galleria. The cinema was designed by San Francisco architect George K Raad. The movie theater closed in Spring 2020, due to the COVID-19 pandemic.

In 1977, Bullock's opened at the mall, which was later converted to Nordstrom in 1988.

In 1987, Stonestown went through a renovation and major redevelopment spearheaded by architect John Field. Field's plan added one story of stores, including a food court, a glass ceiling and marble floors, plus 350 new underground parking spaces. These changes led to the Stonestown Shopping Center being renamed Stonestown Galleria.

In 1996, The Emporium was converted to Macy's when Federated Department Stores bought Broadway Stores Inc. in 1995.

In December 2003, Heitman Financial, the manager, abandoned efforts to construct nearly 300 new residential units and a grocery store on a parcel next to the mall's 42-acre (170,000 m^{2}) site. Neighborhood groups complained that the project would worsen traffic congestion in the area and create safety and environmental problems.

In 2004, General Growth Properties bought the mall from Pacific Acquisition Corp. for $312 million.

In November 2017, Macy's announced plans to close its store at the mall. The store closed in March 2018.

On June 6, 2018, an article reported that Nordstrom would also be closing within the next 18 months which would leave the mall with no anchors; however, the article also reported that Nordstrom "has no store closures to announce".

Nordstrom eventually closed on September 14, 2019, therefore leaving Target as one of the last anchor tenants.

A 12-screen movie theatre operated by Regal Cinemas opened in May 2021. On September 8, 2023, Japanese arcade and entertainment company Round1 announced plans to take over the space that used to be occupied by Nordstrom. The arcade opened on November 9, 2024.

== In other media ==
The mall is featured on the cover art for Underscores' third album, U (2026), as drawn by Japanese artist Ochiai Shohei. Footage of Underscores at the mall is used as the album's visualizer on YouTube.

== See also ==
- Lakeside Neighborhood
- Stoneridge Shopping Center
