= 29 Sunset =

San Francisco bus route

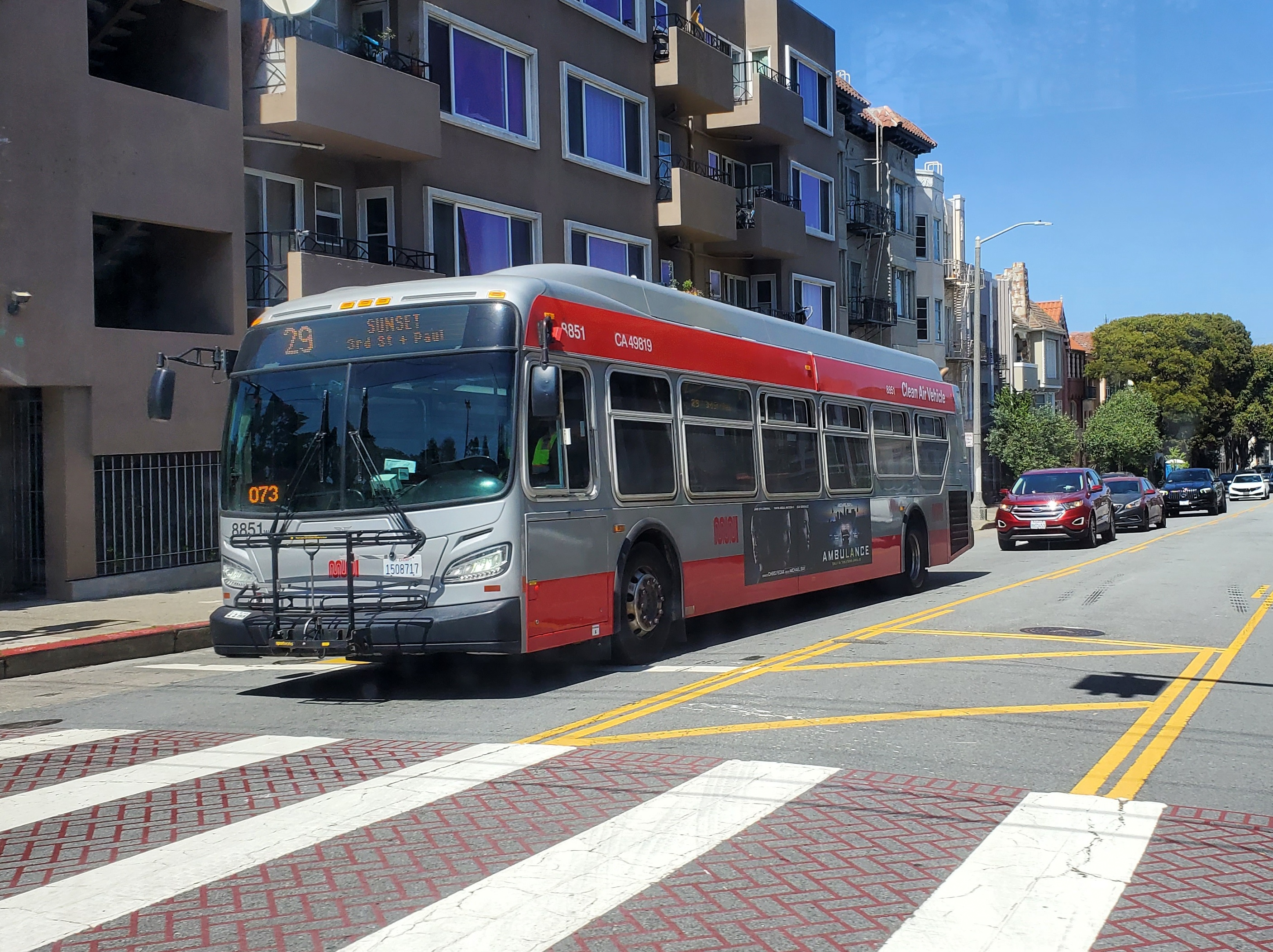
- Route 29 bus at Fulton Street, April 2022

Overview
- Operator: San Francisco Municipal Railway
- Vehicle: New Flyer XDE40
- Began service: January 27, 1982

Route
- Locale: San Francisco, California
- Start: Bowley St & Lincoln Blvd
- Via: Sunset Boulevard, Ocean Avenue, Mansell Street
- End: Gilman Ave & Hawes St
- Length: 14.4 miles (23.2 km)
- Daily ridership: 17,500 (2019)
- Map: 29 Sunset

29 Sunset is a bus line operated by the San Francisco Municipal Railway. The line connects the Richmond District and Sunset District to the city's southern neighborhoods through to the Bayview. It is a key cross-town route.

== Route ==
From its northern terminus at Lincoln Boulevard and Bowley, the 29 Sunset runs down Bowley to Camino Del Mar and 25th Avenue. The route traverses Golden Gate Park via Crossover Drive, then runs on Lincoln Way to Sunset. After running on Sunset, the line turns onto Lake Merced Boulevad, then Winston before running past the Stonestown Galleria station and turning onto 19th Avenue. After passing San Francisco State University station, buses make a dogleg onto Crespi to serve Parkmerced before returning to 19th and continuing on Holloway. The line splits with directional runs on Junipero Sera northbound and Beverly southbound to Garfield. The line continues onto Grafton and then turns on Plymouth to Ocean, where it runs in parallel to the K Ingleside and passes Balboa Park station.

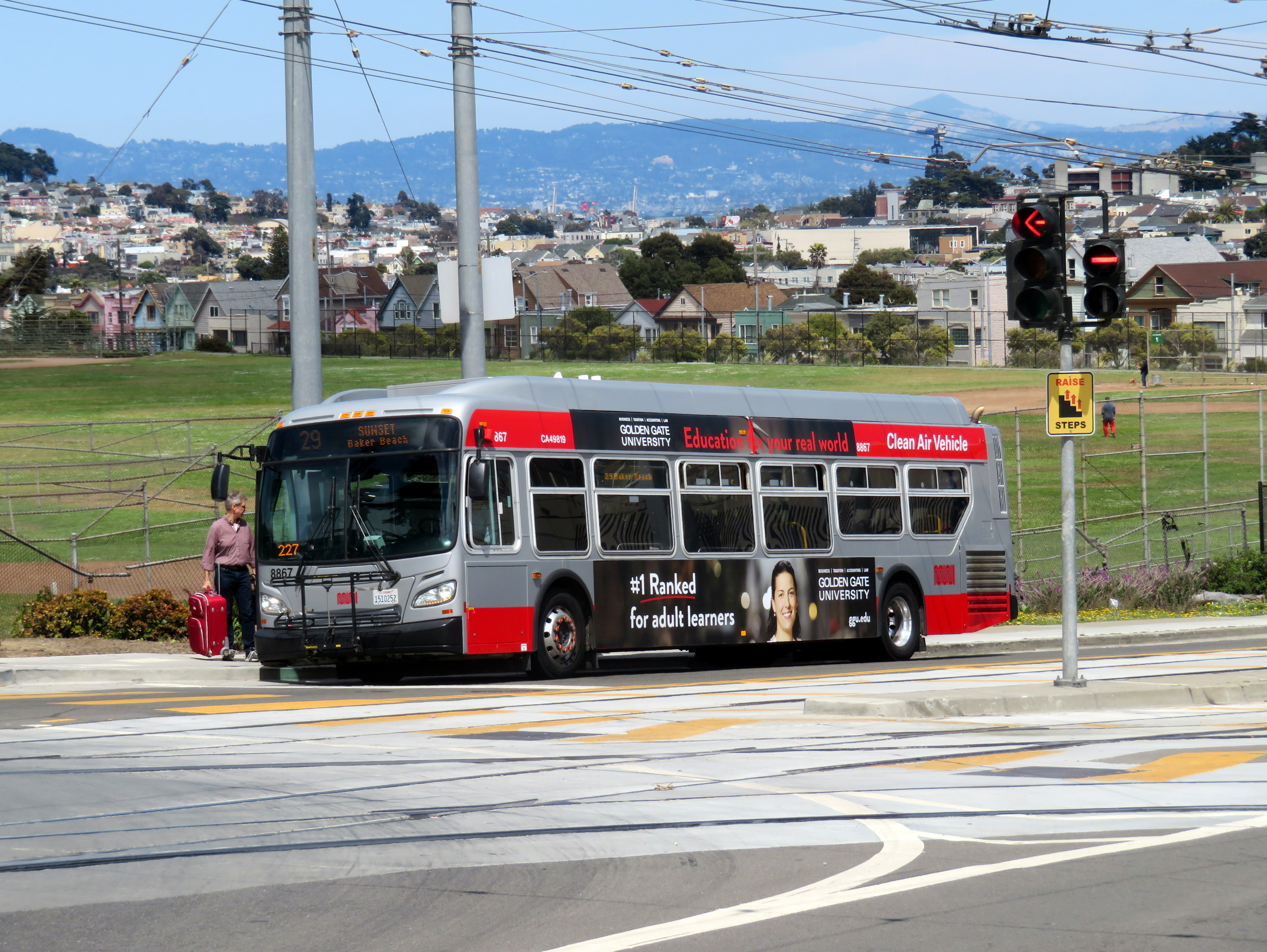
29 bus at Balboa Park, July 2018

It crosses Mission Street after turning onto Persia, which becomes Mansell, and the 29 turns left onto San Bruno then right on Paul Avenue to cross under Highway 101. It passes the Gilman/Paul station before turning onto Keith and Fitzgerald, where trips terminate. Westbound/northbound trips run from there, turning around via Fitzgerald, Hawes, Gilman, Giants, Ingerson, Hawes, and Gilman before running the reverse route.

== History ==
The 29 Sunset was established on January 27, 1982, as part of the implementation of Muni's five-year plan. Service was rerouted off of Mission and onto Ocean as part of route restructuring in September 2015. Plans to implement rapid service along the route were put forward in the 2020s.
