= Randolph station =

Randolph station may refer to:

- Randolph station (Vermont)
- Randolph station (Erie Railroad) in New York

== Former Chicago "L" stations ==
- East/Randolph station
- Oak Park/Randolph station
- Randolph/Market station
- Randolph/Wabash station
- Randolph/Wells station
- Wisconsin/Randolph station

== Muni Metro stations in San Francisco ==
- Randolph and Arch station
- Randolph and Bright station
- 19th Avenue and Junipero Serra / 19th Avenue and Randolph stations
- 19th Avenue and Randolph station

== Places with similar names ==
- Holbrook/Randolph station in Massachusetts
- Millennium Station, formerly known as Randolph Street Terminal
- Snelling & Randolph station in Minnesota
- Randolph, Indiana, formerly known as Randolph Station
