= Broad and Capitol station =

Muni Metro light rail stop in San Francisco

Broad and Capitol
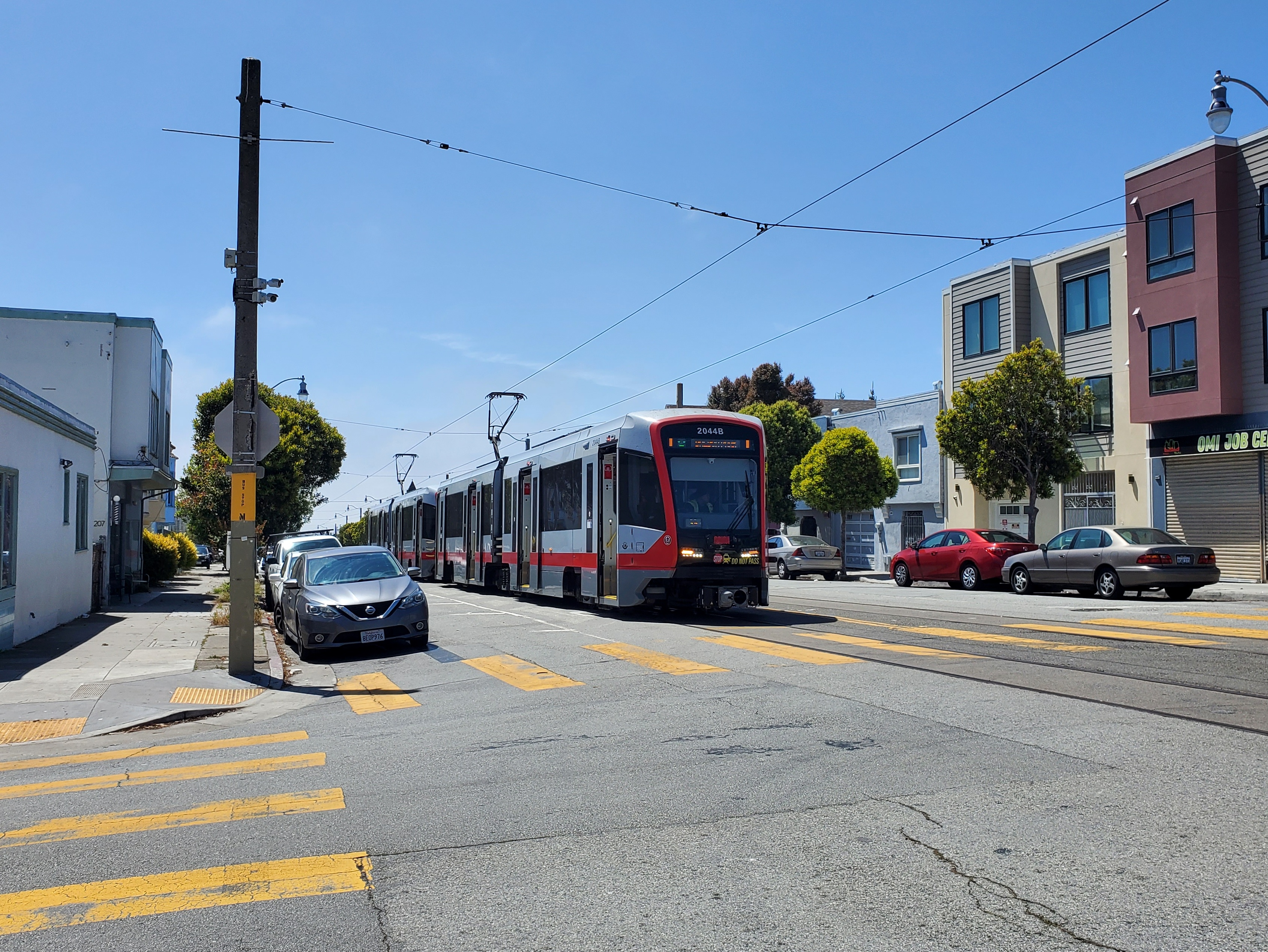
- An outbound train at Broad and Capitol in July 2023

General information
- Location: Broad Street at Capitol Avenue; San Francisco, California
- Coordinates: 37.71319°N 122.45904°W
- Platforms: None, passengers wait on sidewalk
- Tracks: 2

Construction
- Accessible: No

History
- Opened: October 6, 1925

Services
Preceding station	Muni	Following station
Broad and Orizaba toward Embarcadero	M Ocean View	Broad and Plymouth toward San Jose and Geneva (Balboa Park)
Location

Broad and Capitol station is a light rail stop on the Muni Metro M Ocean View line, located in the Ingleside neighborhood of San Francisco, California. The stop has no platforms; trains stop at marked poles before crossing Capitol Avenue and passengers cross a vehicle travel lane on Broad Street to board trains. The stop is not accessible.

== History ==
The M Ocean View line opened on October 6, 1925. The line was replaced with buses on August 6, 1939, but streetcar service resumed on December 17, 1944.

In 2022, the SFMTA begin planning the M Ocean View Transit and Safety Project, a MuniForward project intended to improve reliability of the segment between Junipero Serra Boulevard and Balboa Park station. Initial proposals released that September called for transit bulbs at Broad and Capitol. A revised proposal in May 2023 kept this design. As of October 2023, "quick-build" implementation of some changes is expected to begin in late 2023, with main construction beginning in 2026.
