= Randolph and Bright station =

Muni Metro light rail stop in San Francisco

Randolph and Bright
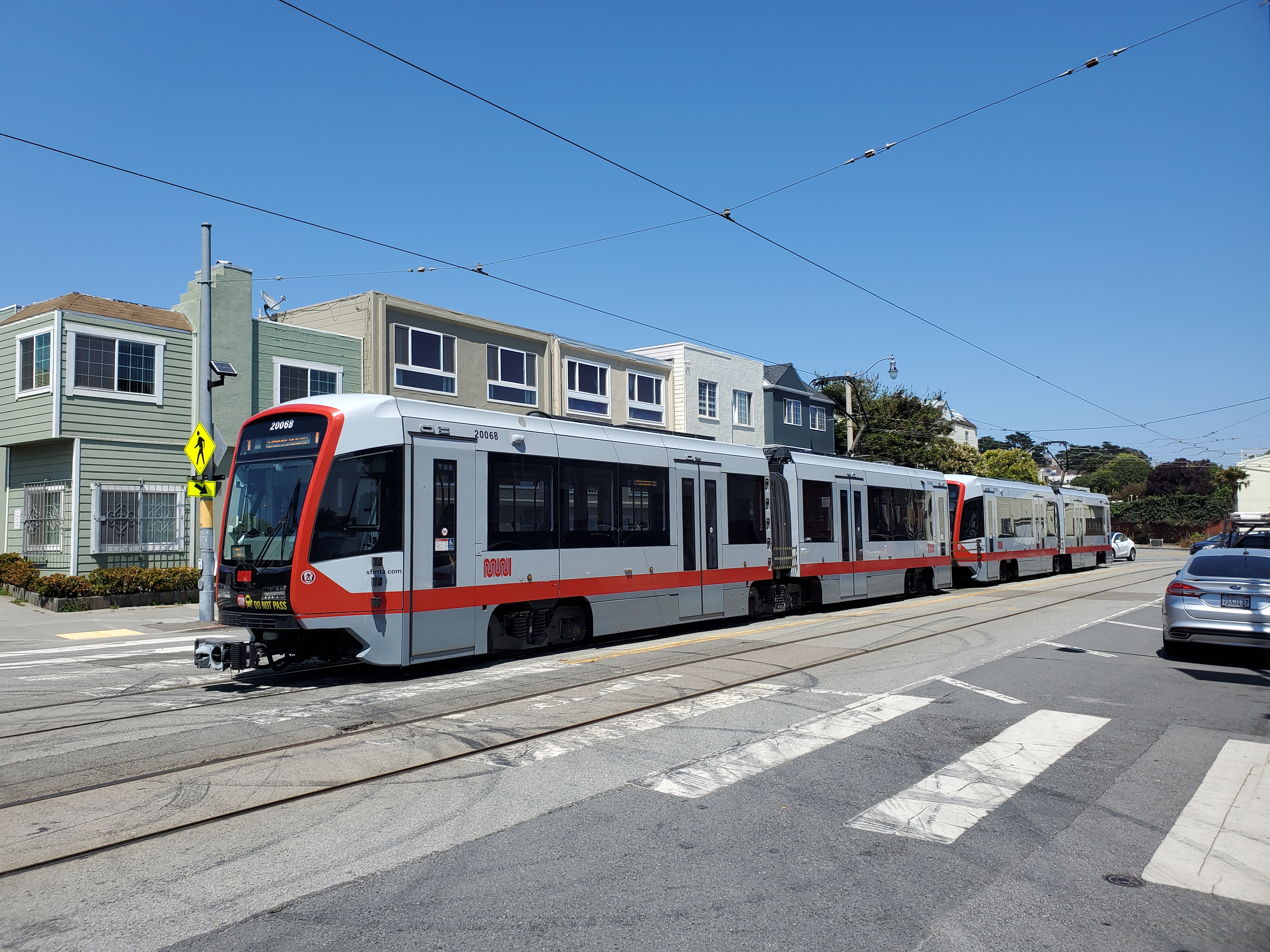
- An inbound train at Randolph and Bright in July 2023

General information
- Location: Randolph Street at Bright Street; San Francisco, California
- Coordinates: 37°42′51″N 122°27′49″W
- Platforms: None, passengers wait on sidewalk
- Tracks: 2

Construction
- Accessible: No

History
- Opened: October 6, 1925

Services
Preceding station	Muni	Following station
Randolph and Arch toward Embarcadero	M Ocean View	Broad and Orizaba toward San Jose and Geneva (Balboa Park)
Location

Randolph and Bright station is a light rail stop on the Muni Metro M Ocean View line, located in the Ingleside neighborhood of San Francisco, California. The stop has no platforms; trains stop at marked poles before crossing Bright Street and passengers cross a parking lane on Randolph Street to board trains. The stop is not accessible.

== History ==
The M Ocean View line opened on October 6, 1925. The line was replaced with buses on August 6, 1939, but streetcar service resumed on December 17, 1944.

In 2022, the SFMTA begin planning the M Ocean View Transit and Safety Project, a MuniForward project intended to improve reliability of the segment between Junipero Serra Boulevard and Balboa Park station. Initial proposals released that September called for the stop at Randolph and Bright to be consolidated with the stop at Broad and Orizaba, with a single new stop located at Randolph and Orizaba. A revised proposal in May 2023 reversed this consolidation, with transit bulbs to be installed at Randolph and Bright. As of October 2023, "quick-build" implementation of some changes is expected to begin in late 2023, with main construction beginning in 2026.
