= Randolph and Arch station =

Muni Metro light rail stop in San Francisco

Randolph and Arch
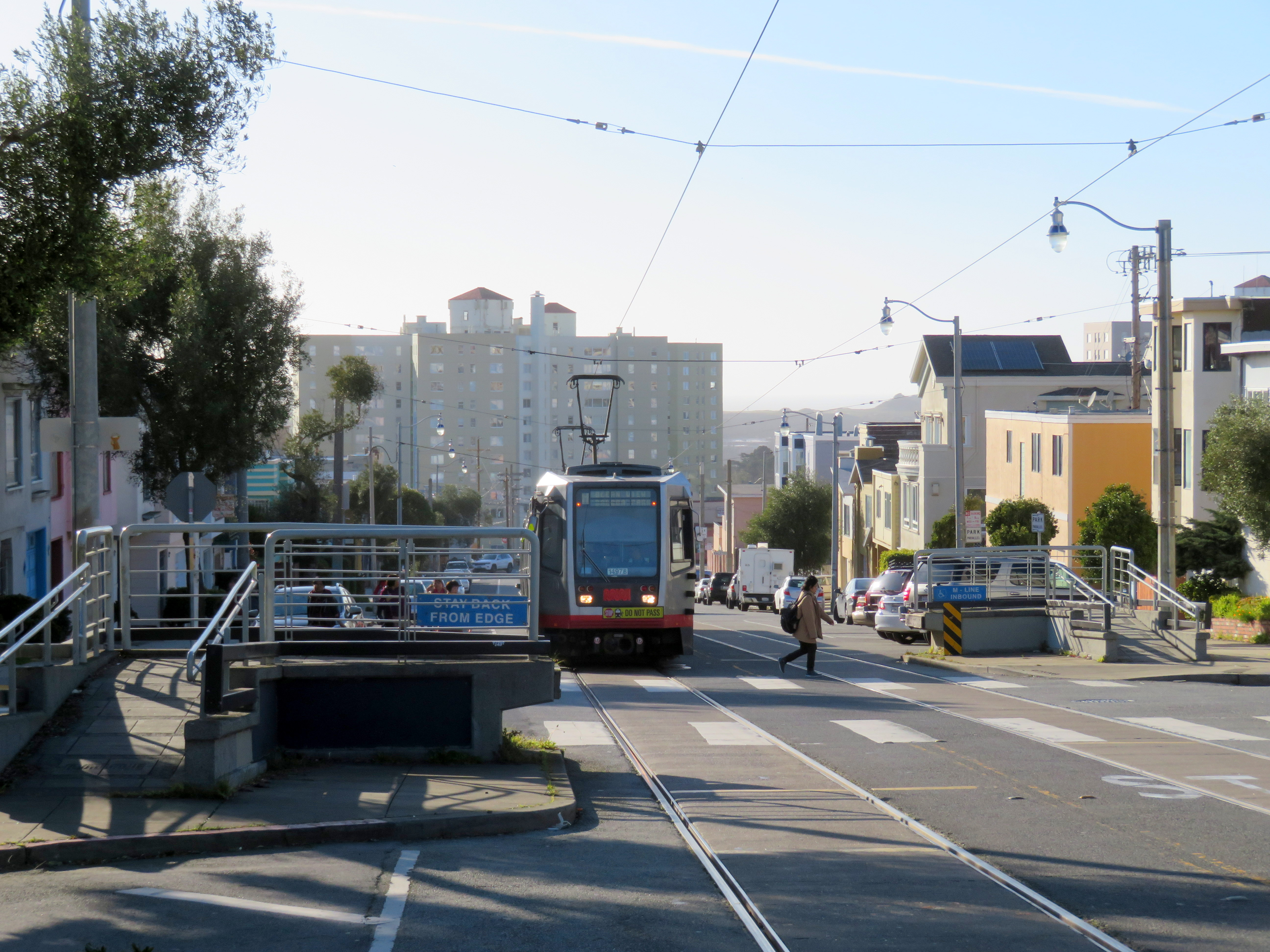
- An outbound train at Randolph and Arch in 2019

General information
- Location: Randolph Street at Arch Street; San Francisco, California
- Coordinates: 37.71426°N 122.46710°W
- Platforms: 2 side platforms
- Tracks: 2

Construction
- Accessible: Yes

History
- Opened: October 6, 1925

Services
Preceding station	Muni	Following station
19th Avenue and Randolph toward Embarcadero	M Ocean View	Randolph and Bright toward San Jose and Geneva (Balboa Park)
Location

Randolph and Arch is a light rail stop on the Muni Metro M Ocean View line, located in the Ingleside Heights neighborhood of San Francisco, California. The stop has no regular platforms; passengers cross a parking lane to board trains. Mini-high platforms for accessibility are located on the far side of Arch Street.

== History ==
The M Ocean View line opened on October 6, 1925. The line was replaced with buses on August 6, 1939, but streetcar service resumed on December 17, 1944.

In 2022, the SFMTA begin planning the M Ocean View Transit and Safety Project, a MuniForward project intended to improve reliability of the segment between Junipero Serra Boulevard and Balboa Park station. Initial proposals released that September did not call for any changes to Randolph and Arch. A revised proposal in May 2023 called for transit bulbs long enough for the first car of trains. As of October 2023, "quick-build" implementation of some changes is expected to begin in late 2023, with main construction beginning in 2026.
