= Broad and Orizaba / Orizaba and Broad stations =

Pair of light rail stops in San Francisco

Broad and Orizaba Orizaba and Broad
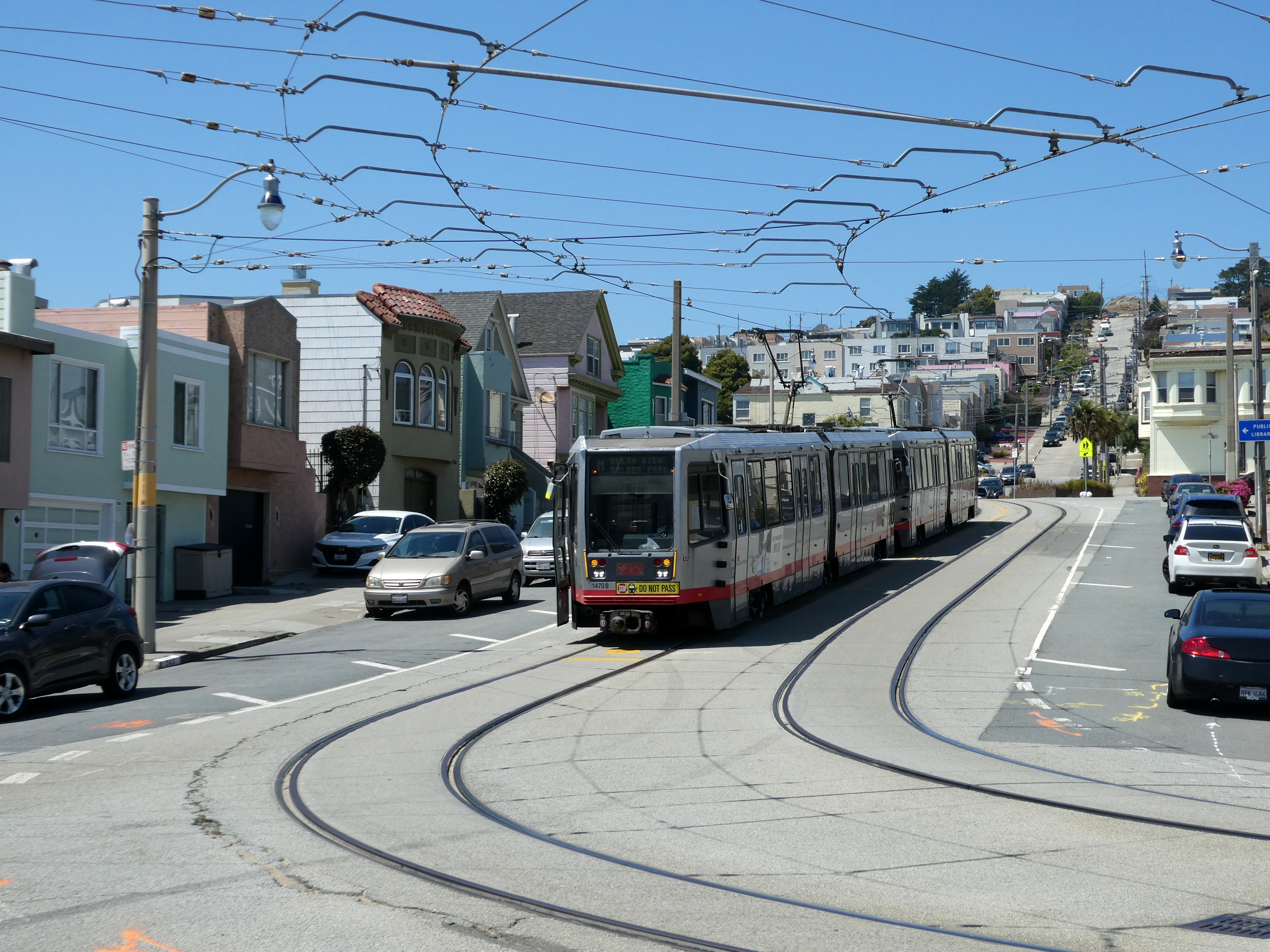
- An outbound train at Orizaba and Broad in July 2023

General information
- Location: Broad Street and Orizaba Avenue; San Francisco, California
- Coordinates: 37°42′47″N 122°27′45″W
- Platforms: None, passengers wait on sidewalk
- Tracks: 2

Construction
- Accessible: No

History
- Opened: October 6, 1925

Services
| Preceding station | Muni | Following station |
|---|---|---|
| Randolph and Bright toward Embarcadero | M Ocean View | Broad and Capitol toward San Jose and Geneva (Balboa Park) |
Location

Broad and Orizaba / Orizaba and Broad stations are a pair of light rail stops on the Muni Metro M Ocean View line, located in the Ingleside neighborhood of San Francisco, California. The inbound stop is located on Broad Street at Orizaba Avenue, while outbound trains stop on Orizaba Avenue at Broad Street. The stop has no platforms; trains stop at marked poles and passengers cross a vehicle travel lane to board or depart trains. The stop is not accessible.

== History ==
The M Ocean View line opened on October 6, 1925. The line was replaced with buses on August 6, 1939, but streetcar service resumed on December 17, 1944.

In 2022, the SFMTA begin planning the M Ocean View Transit and Safety Project, a MuniForward project intended to improve reliability of the segment between Junipero Serra Boulevard and Balboa Park station. Initial proposals released that September called for the stop at Broad and Orizaba to be consolidated with the stop at Randolph and Bright, with a single new stop located at Randolph and Orizaba. A revised proposal in May 2023 reversed this consolidation. As of October 2023, "quick-build" implementation of some changes is expected to begin in late 2023, with main construction beginning in 2026.
