= 19th Avenue and Junipero Serra / 19th Avenue and Randolph stations =

Muni Metro light rail stops in San Francisco

19th Avenue and Junipero Serra 19th Avenue and Randolph
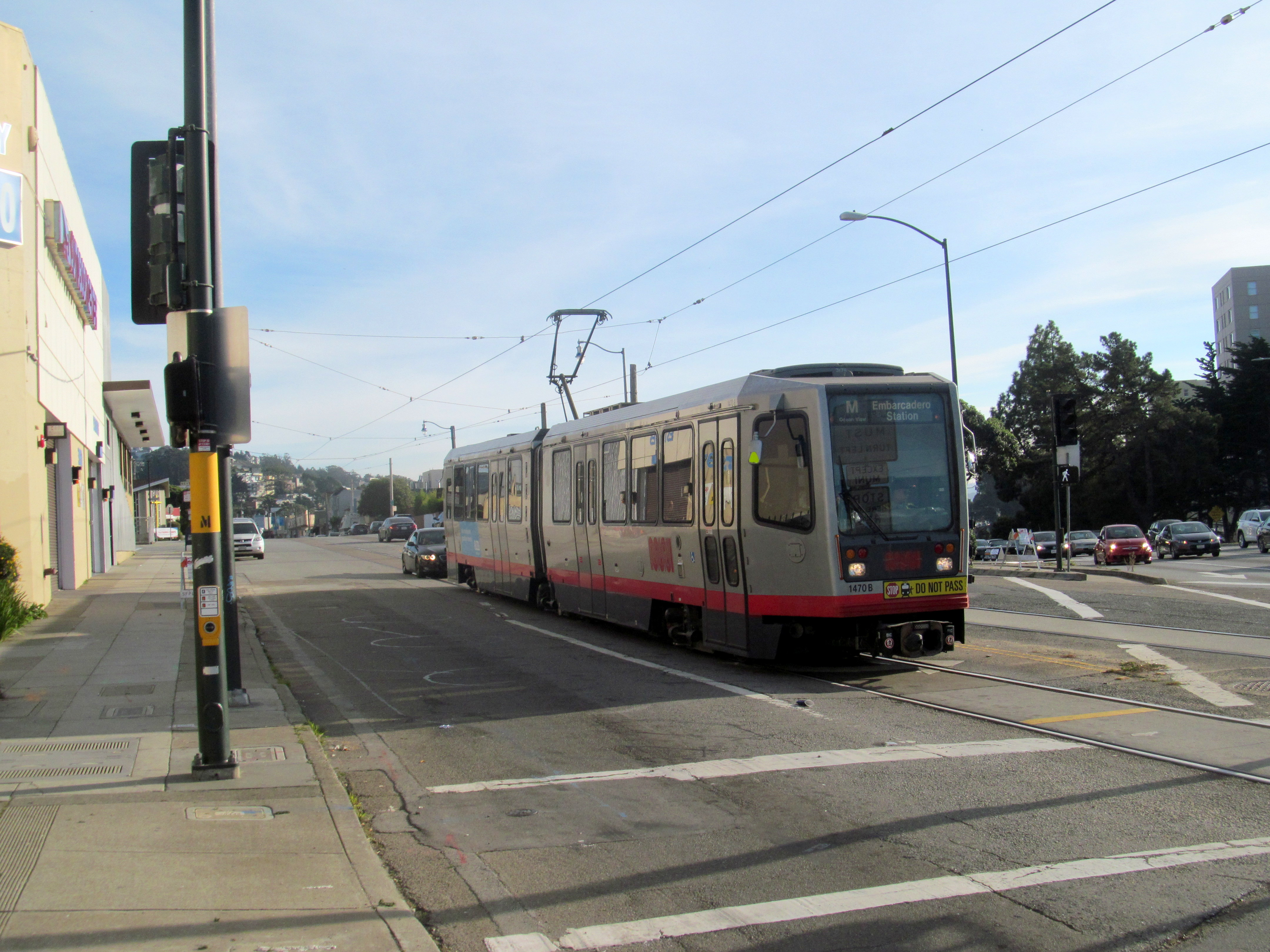
- A northbound train at 19th Avenue and Junipero Serra in 2017

General information
- Location: 19th Avenue between Junipero Serra Boulevard and Randolph Avenue; San Francisco, California
- Coordinates: 37°43′03″N 122°28′22″W
- Platforms: None, passengers wait on sidewalk
- Tracks: 2

Construction
- Accessible: No

History
- Opened: October 6, 1925

Services
Preceding station	Muni	Following station
San Francisco State University toward Embarcadero	M Ocean View	19th Avenue and Randolph toward San Jose and Geneva (Balboa Park)
Location

19th Avenue and Junipero Serra / 19th Avenue and Randolph stations are a pair of light rail stops on the Muni Metro M Ocean View line, located in the Merced Heights neighborhood of San Francisco, California. The inbound stop is located on 19th Avenue at Junipero Serra Boulevard, while outbound trains stop on 19th Avenue at Randolph Avenue. (A separate stop, labeled 19th Avenue and Randolph in both directions, is located two blocks to the southeast.) The stop has no platforms; trains stop at marked poles and passengers cross a vehicle travel lane on 19th Avenue to board and depart trains. The stop is not accessible.

== History ==
The M Ocean View line opened on October 6, 1925. The line was replaced with buses on August 6, 1939, but streetcar service resumed on December 17, 1944.

In 2022, the SFMTA begin planning the M Ocean View Transit and Safety Project, a MuniForward project intended to improve reliability of the segment between Junipero Serra Boulevard and Balboa Park station. Initial proposals released that September called for the inbound stops at Junipero Serra and Randolph to be consolidated into a single stop near Sargent Street. A revised proposal in May 2023 eliminated the existing outbound stop at Randolph (opposite Sargent). A further revision in August 2023 called for a single outbound stop near Sargent, opposite the combined inbound stop. The inbound and outbound platforms would be boarding islands long enough for two cars, separated from the curb by bike lanes. This revision also added mini-high platforms at the stop for accessibility. As of October 2023, "quick-build" implementation of some changes is expected to begin in late 2023, with main construction beginning in 2026.
