= M Ocean View =

Light rail line in San Francisco, California

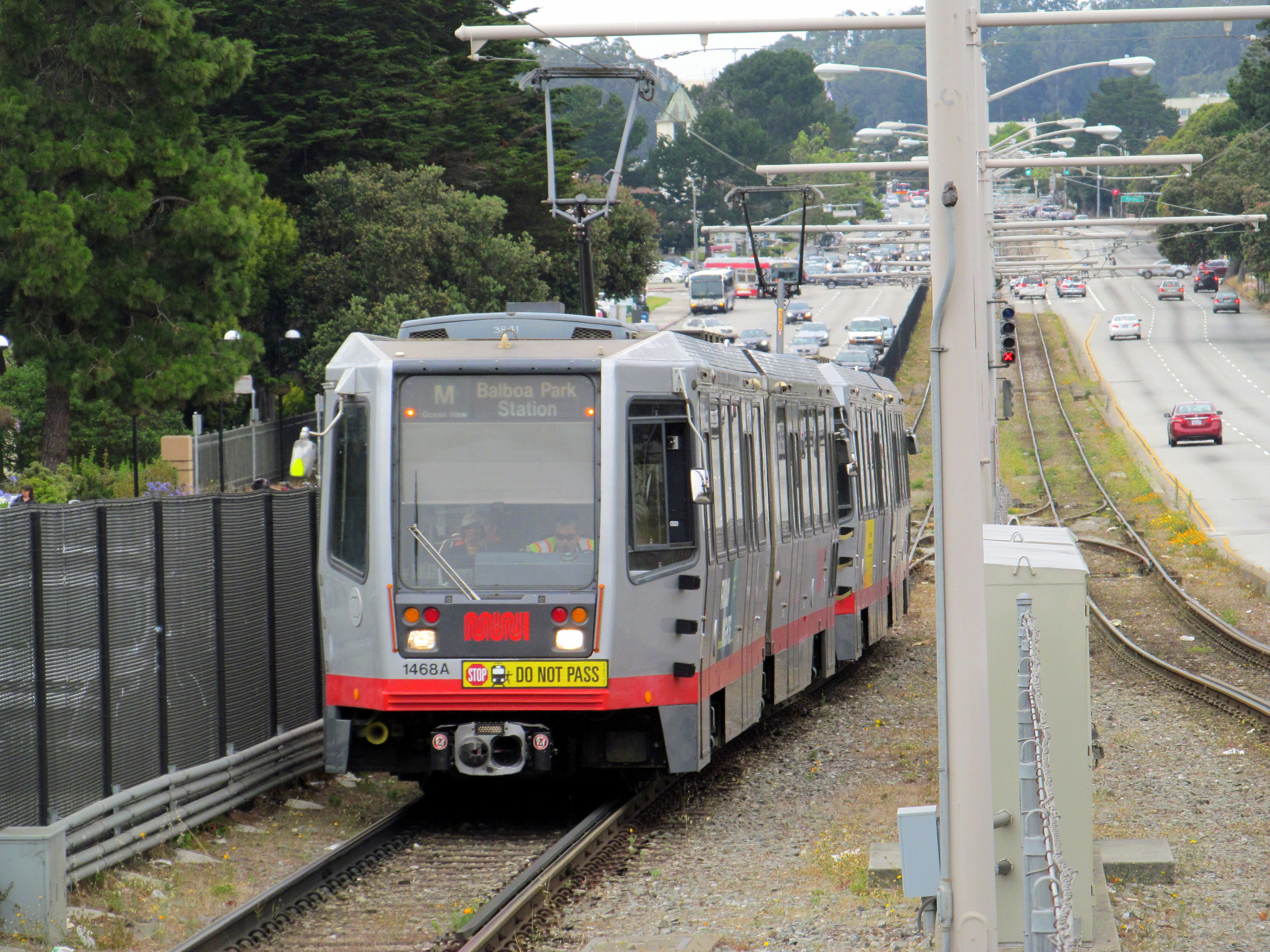
- A train near San Francisco State University station in 2017

Overview
- Owner: San Francisco Municipal Transportation Agency
- Locale: San Francisco, California
- Termini: Embarcadero; San Jose and Geneva (Balboa Park)
- Stations: 29

Service
- Type: Light rail
- System: Muni Metro
- Operator: San Francisco Municipal Railway
- Rolling stock: Breda LRV3; Siemens LRV4
- Daily ridership: 19,000 (June 2026)

History
- Opened: October 6, 1925

Technical
- Line length: 9.0 mi (14.5 km)
- Character: At grade and underground
- Track gauge: 4 ft 8 1/2 in (1,435 mm) standard gauge
- Electrification: Overhead line, 600 V DC
Route map
M Ocean View highlighted in green

The M Ocean View is a light rail line that is part of the Muni Metro system in San Francisco, California. Named after the Oceanview neighborhood, it runs between San Jose and Geneva and Embarcadero station, connecting Oceanview, San Francisco State University, and Stonestown Galleria with the city center. The line opened on October 6, 1925.

== Route description ==
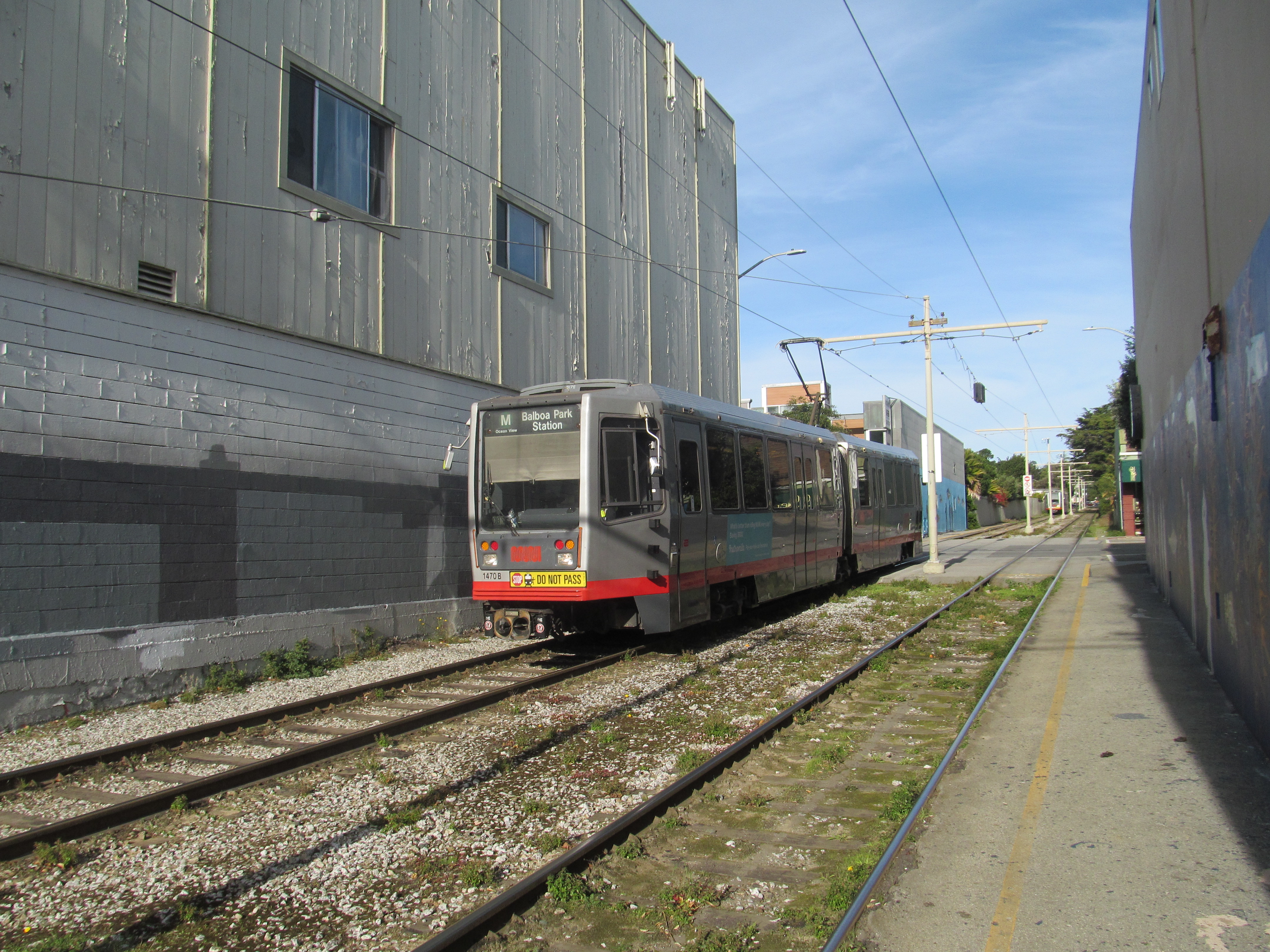
An M Ocean View train in the private right-of-way at Ocean Avenue

The line runs from Embarcadero station in the Financial District to Geneva Avenue and San Jose Avenue near City College of San Francisco in the Balboa Park neighborhood. The downtown portion of the line runs through the Market Street subway, which it shares with three other Muni Metro lines. It continues through the much older Twin Peaks Tunnel, emerging at West Portal Station. From there, it follows West Portal Avenue to the Saint Francis Circle, where it then takes its own right-of-way to 19th Avenue. The portion of the line on 19th Avenue between where it joins 19th near Eucalyptus Drive and Junipero Serra Boulevard is a right-of-way separated from the street. This section has two stations with high-platforms, one at the Stonestown Galleria on Winston Drive and the other at San Francisco State University on Holloway Avenue. It continues on 19th Avenue past Junipero Serra to Randolph Street. At the end of Randolph, the M uses Orizaba Avenue to get to Broad Street and takes that to San Jose Avenue. The rest of the line follows San Jose Avenue to Geneva Avenue, where the line loops around the Metro yard there on the corner opposite from Balboa Park Station.

=== Operation ===
The M Ocean View begins service at 5 a.m. on weekdays, 6 a.m. Saturdays and 8 a.m. Sundays, with the end of service occurring around 12:30 a.m. each night. Daytime headways are 10 to 12 minutes.

Service on most of the route is provided by overnight Owl buses during the hours that rail service is not running. The L Owl serves the portion between Embarcadero and West Portal, and the 91 Owl serves the portion between West Portal and SF State. On weekends, the M Ocean View Bus service runs from 5 a.m. until the start of rail service. The bus line largely follows the rail line, but it uses surface streets to parallel sections where the rail line has dedicated rights-of-way.

== History ==
The M Ocean View line began operation on October 6, 1925, as a shuttle service from St. Francis Circle to the wye at Broad and Plymouth in the city's Ocean View District. It was extended through the Twin Peaks Tunnel to the downtown Ferry Building on October 31, 1927, but reverted to a shuttle service on February 27, 1928. The shuttle service was replaced by buses on August 6, 1939, but streetcar service returned on the full length of the line on December 17, 1944. On June 6, 1948, the Transbay Terminal became the inner terminus of the line.

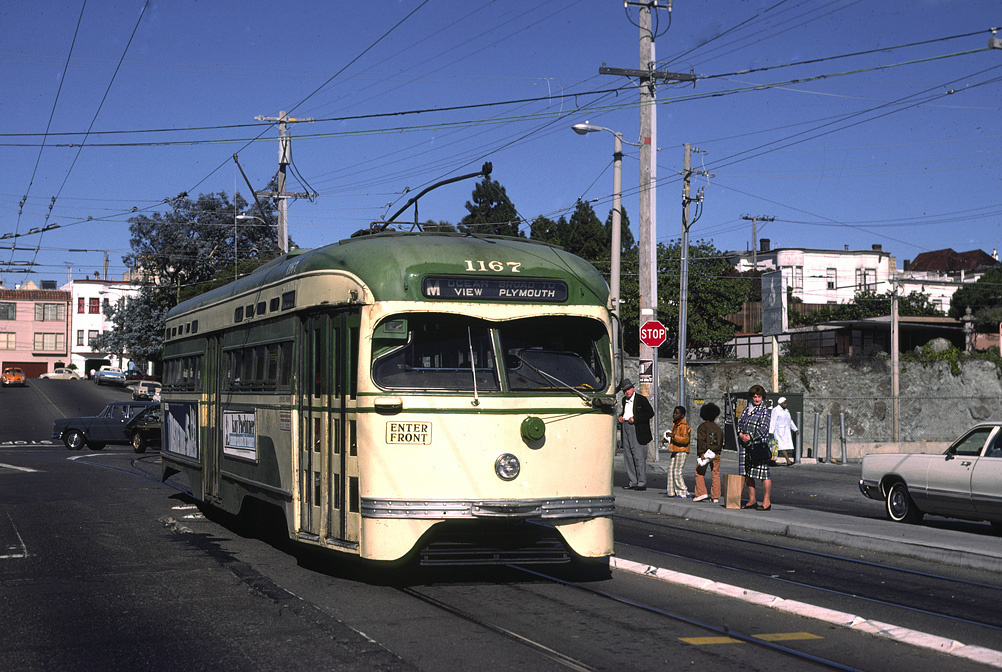
An outbound M Ocean View PCC streetcar on a diversion route during construction of the Market Street subway. Photo taken between 1972 and 1982

While many streetcar lines were permanently converted to buses after World War II, the M Ocean View remained a streetcar line due to its use of the Twin Peaks Tunnel. Service was diverted to Duboce Avenue, Church Street, and 17th Street on December 2, 1972, due to construction of the Market Street subway. On August 30, 1980, the line was extended to Balboa Park BART station. The full line was partially converted to modern light-rail operation with the opening of the Muni Metro system on December 17, 1980. Eureka Valley in the Twin Peaks Tunnel was originally a stop in regular service, but the station was closed in 1972 and replaced, ten years later, by Castro Street Station when the Market Street subway system opened.

=== Muni Metro ===
In the early 1970s, Muni began planning an extension of the J Church line over new track to Balboa Park station, then over the M Ocean View line to the high-ridership San Francisco State University station and Stonestown Galleria station. A Final Environmental Impact Statement for the new track was released in 1983; it was opened for non-revenue moves in August 1991 and began revenue service in June 1993. Original plans called for the two existing stations to be rebuilt with high-level platforms, and a pocket track to allow J Church trains to turn back. After objections from neighbors, the pocket track was removed from the plan.

The first phase of the 19th Ave. Platform & Trackway Improvement Project required the line to be replaced by buses south of St. Francis Circle from June 19 to October 23, 1993; the new platforms at the two stations were opened when service was restored, though several minor stops along 19th Avenue were left permanently closed. The second phase required full bustitution beginning on July 30, 1994; rail service was restored to Stonestown on November 19 for holiday shopping, and on the rest of the line on January 28, 1995. Some weekday J and M service was through-routed beginning on March 27, 1995; this lasted until a rail replacement project on the M in February 1998. Full combined J/M service was planned upon completion of the automated train control system and the Muni Metro Turnback; however, this was never implemented even after the construction projects were finished.

In 2010, Muni replaced the rail junction just south of St. Francis Circle station. Rail service south of West Portal station was replaced with buses from May 17 to September 4. The line was temporarily replaced by buses from June 25 to August 24, 2018 due to the Twin Peaks Tunnel shutdown. During that time, a new traffic signal with transit signal priority was installed where the line crosses the northbound lanes of 19th Avenue at Rossmoor Drive, and red transit-only lanes were painted to indicate that drivers must not block the crossing.

On March 30, 2020, M Ocean View light-rail service was replaced with buses due to the COVID-19 pandemic. Light-rail service on the M resumed on August 22, 2020, with the routes reconfigured to improve reliability in the subway. M Ocean View and T Third Street service were interlined, running between Sunnydale station and San Jose and Geneva (Balboa Park station). M Light-rail service was re-replaced by the M Bus on August 25 due to issues with malfunctioning overhead wire splices and the need to quarantine control center staff after a COVID-19 case. M rail service resumed on August 14, 2021, with the line terminating at Embarcadero again.

==== Subway proposal ====
The M Ocean View moves at only 8.5 to 9.5 miles per hour (13.7 to 15.3 km/h) during afternoon commute hours over a 2-mile (3.2 km) distance along 19th Avenue/Highway 1. The slow speed is attributed to trains stopping at multiple busy street crossings. In addition, the majority of riders access 19th Avenue stops from the west side of 19th, since Stonestown Galleria, San Francisco State University and Parkmerced are all located west of 19th. In order to access the stops, which are located in the median of 19th Avenue, pedestrians cross three lanes of traffic and a turn lane. In San Francisco, 55% of severe and fatal pedestrian accidents occur on 7% of its street miles, which includes the 19th Avenue/Highway 1 corridor. In response, the San Francisco County Transportation Authority published studies in 2010 and 2014 which explored options to facilitate pedestrian access and improve travel times.

The full-subway option was chosen for further development and named the Muni Subway Expansion Project (MSXP). Under the preliminary concept for MSXP, the rail line would remain underground past West Portal station. K Ingleside would branch off from the underground line and surface on Junipero Serra Boulevard just south of Saint Francis Circle. M Ocean View will remain underground along the current right of way under West Portal Avenue and 19th Avenue, branching off at Holloway to Parkmerced. The underground line would continue with J Church service along 19th until surfacing just east of the intersection of 19th and Junipero Serra, then continuing on to Balboa Park via Randolph, Broad, and San Jose.

The current West Portal station would most likely have to be redesigned as a two-level station with the K/M lines on the lower level and the L line on the upper level. New underground stations would be constructed at Saint Francis Circle (K/M lines), Winston Drive (M, serving Stonestown), Holloway (J/M, serving SF State), and Parkmerced (M). A potential infill station could be constructed at Ocean Avenue in Lakeside Village. Several existing surface stations would be removed; in most cases, they would be replaced by underground stations. The proposed full subway line would continue past Parkmerced with a long tail track; that tail track could be extended in the future to connect to the Daly City BART station via the M line. The total cost of the full subway line project was estimated at approximately $3 billion.

=== Muni Forward project ===
In 2022, the SFMTA begin planning the M Ocean View Transit and Safety Project, a MuniForward project intended to improve reliability of the segment between Junipero Serra Boulevard and Balboa Park station. Initial proposals released that September included transit lanes and platform lengthening on San Jose Avenue, consolidation of several closely spaced stops, and four new traffic signals. A revised proposal in May 2023 eliminated one stop consolidation and two traffic signals, but added modifications to the terminal at San Jose and Geneva. As of October 2023, "quick-build" implementation of some changes is expected to begin in late 2023, with main construction beginning in 2026.

In May 2024, the Federal Transit Administration awarded the SFMTA $4.7 million to construct accessible platforms at eight Muni Metro stops, including three M Ocean View stops.

== Station listing ==
The M Ocean View line stops at large stations for the downtown section of the route and on 19th Avenue and at smaller stops on the rest of the line. Most of the smaller stops are nothing more than a sign on the side of the street designating a stop and a few others are concrete 'islands' in the middle of the street next to the tracks that provide access for wheelchairs. Muni bus routes provide service to all stations and other systems with access to the stations are noted.

Station/Stop	Neighborhood	Muni Metro lines	Notes and connections
Embarcadero	Financial District	J Church K Ingleside L Taraval N Judah S Shuttle	BART: F Market & Wharves; California; SF Ferry Terminal; Muni: 1, 2, 6, 7X, 9, 9R, 12, 14, 14R, 14X, 21, 30X, 31, 41, 81X, 82X; Golden Gate Transit, Presidio Go Shuttle, SamTrans
Montgomery	Financial District	J Church K Ingleside L Taraval N Judah S Shuttle	BART: F Market & Wharves; Muni: 2, 3, 5, 5R, 6, 7, 7X, 8, 8AX, 8BX, 9, 9R, 10, 15, 21, 30, 31, 45, 76X, 81X, Geary BRT (38, 38R); AC Transit, Golden Gate Transit, SamTrans
Powell	Civic Center, Mid-Market, Tenderloin	(at Union Sq/Market St)	BART: F Market & Wharves; Powell–Hyde, Powell–Mason; Muni: 5, 5R, 6, 7, 7X, 8, 8AX, 8BX, 9, 9R, 15, 21, 27, 30, 31,45, 81X; AC Transit, SamTrans
Civic Center/UN Plaza	Civic Center, Mid-Market, Tenderloin	J Church K Ingleside L Taraval N Judah S Shuttle	BART: F Market & Wharves; Muni: 5, 5R, 6, 7, 9, 9R, 19, 21, 83X; AC Transit, Golden Gate Transit, SamTrans
Van Ness	Civic Center, Mid-Market, Tenderloin	J Church K Ingleside L Taraval N Judah S Shuttle	F Market & Wharves; Muni: 6, 7, 9, 9R, Van Ness BRT (47, 49, 79X); Regional bus services: AC Transit, SamTrans
Church	Duboce Triangle, Mission Dolores	(Surface stop)	F Market & Wharves; Muni: 22, 37
Castro	Castro District	K Ingleside L Taraval S Shuttle	F Market & Wharves; Muni: 24, 35, 37
Forest Hill	Laguna Honda	K Ingleside L Taraval S Shuttle	Muni: 36, 43, 44, 52
West Portal	West Portal	K Ingleside L Taraval S Shuttle	Muni: 48, 57
West Portal and 14th Avenue	West Portal	K Ingleside	Muni: 57
St. Francis Circle	St. Francis Wood	K Ingleside	Muni: 23, 57
Right Of Way/Ocean	Merced Manor		Located in Muni's private right-of-way
Right Of Way/Eucalyptus	Merced Manor		Located in Muni's private right-of-way; Muni: 57
Stonestown Galleria			Serves Stonestown Galleria.; Muni: 18, 28, 28R, 29, 57, 58
San Francisco State University			Serves San Francisco State University.; Muni: 28, 28R, 29
19th Avenue and Junipero Serra (IB); 19th Avenue and Randolph (OB)	Merced Heights		Muni: 28
19th Avenue and Randolph	Merced Heights		
Randolph and Arch	Merced Heights		
Randolph and Bright	Oceanview		
Broad and Orizaba (IB); Orizaba and Broad (OB)	Oceanview		
Broad and Capitol	Oceanview		
Broad and Plymouth	Oceanview		Muni: 54
San Jose and Farallones	Oceanview		
San Jose and Lakeview	Oceanview		
San Jose and Geneva (IB); San Jose and Niagara (OB)	Balboa Park	J Church K Ingleside	BART: Muni: 8, 8BX, 29, 43, 49, 54, 714, 88; Commute.org, Daly City Bayshore shuttle, Sierra Point shuttle
