= 19th Avenue and Randolph station =

Muni Metro light rail stop in San Francisco

19th Avenue and Randolph
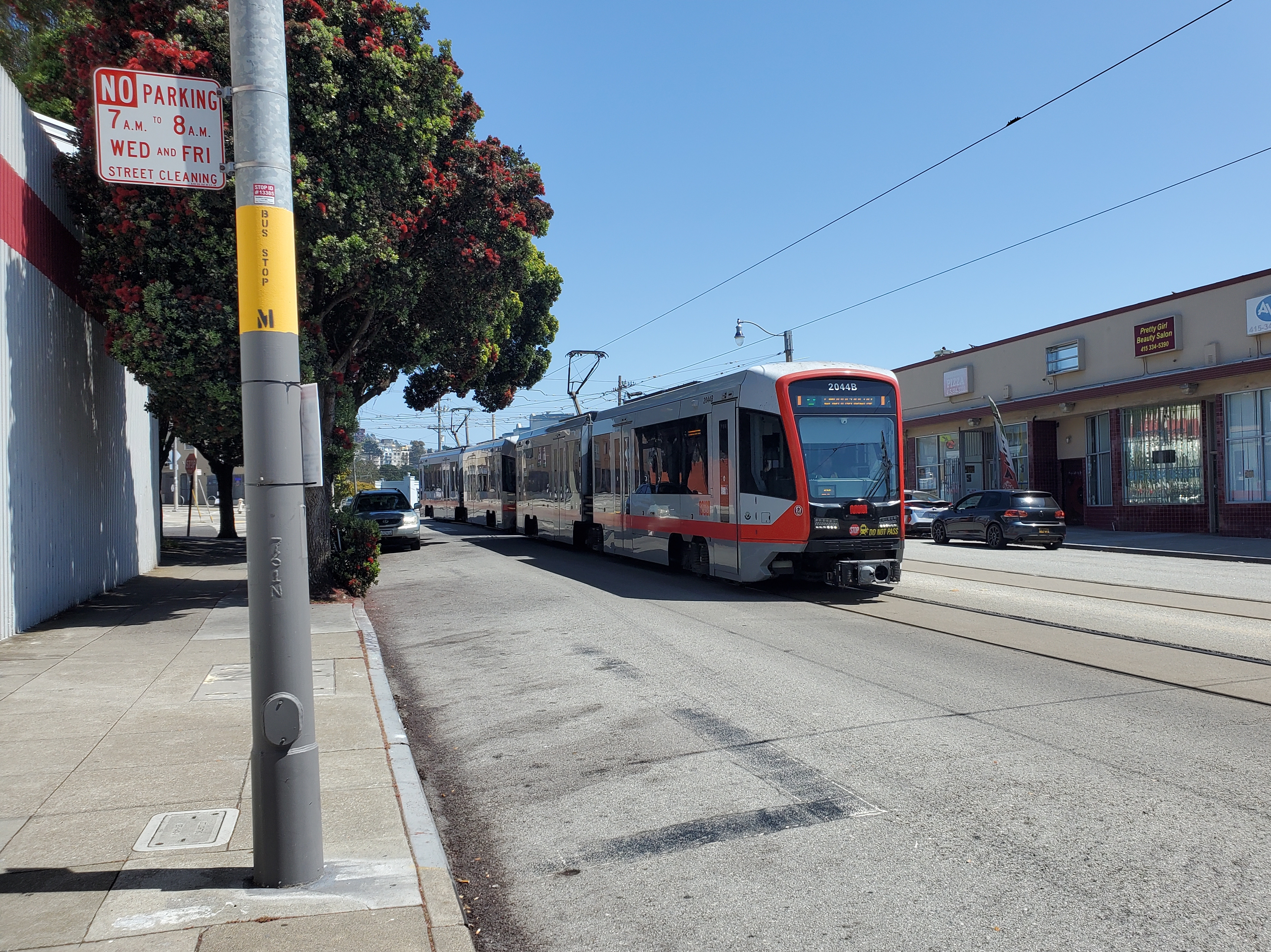
- An inbound train at 19th Avenue and Randolph in July 2023

General information
- Location: 19th Avenue at Randolph Street; San Francisco, California
- Coordinates: 37°42′51″N 122°28′11″W
- Platforms: None, passengers wait on sidewalk
- Tracks: 2

Construction
- Accessible: No

History
- Opened: October 6, 1925

Services
Preceding station	Muni	Following station
19th Avenue and Junipero Serra/Randolph toward Embarcadero	M Ocean View	Randolph and Arch toward San Jose and Geneva (Balboa Park)
Location

19th Avenue and Randolph station is a light rail stop on the Muni Metro M Ocean View line, located in the Ingleside neighborhood of San Francisco, California. The stop has no platforms; trains stop at marked poles before crossing Randolph Street and passengers cross a parking lane on 19th Avenue to board trains. The stop is not accessible.

== History ==
The M Ocean View line opened on October 6, 1925. The line was replaced with buses on August 6, 1939, but streetcar service resumed on December 17, 1944.

In 2022, the SFMTA begin planning the M Ocean View Transit and Safety Project, a MuniForward project intended to improve reliability of the segment between Junipero Serra Boulevard and Balboa Park station. Initial proposals released that September called for the inbound stops at Junipero Serra and Randolph to be consolidated into a single stop near Sargent Street. A further revision in August 2023 called for a single outbound stop near Sargent, opposite the combined inbound stop. The inbound and outbound platforms would be boarding islands long enough for two cars, separated from the curb by bike lanes. This revision also added mini-high platforms at the stop for accessibility. As of October 2023, "quick-build" implementation of some changes is expected to begin in late 2023, with main construction beginning in 2026.
