= Bus bulb =

Bus stop extending into a traffic lane

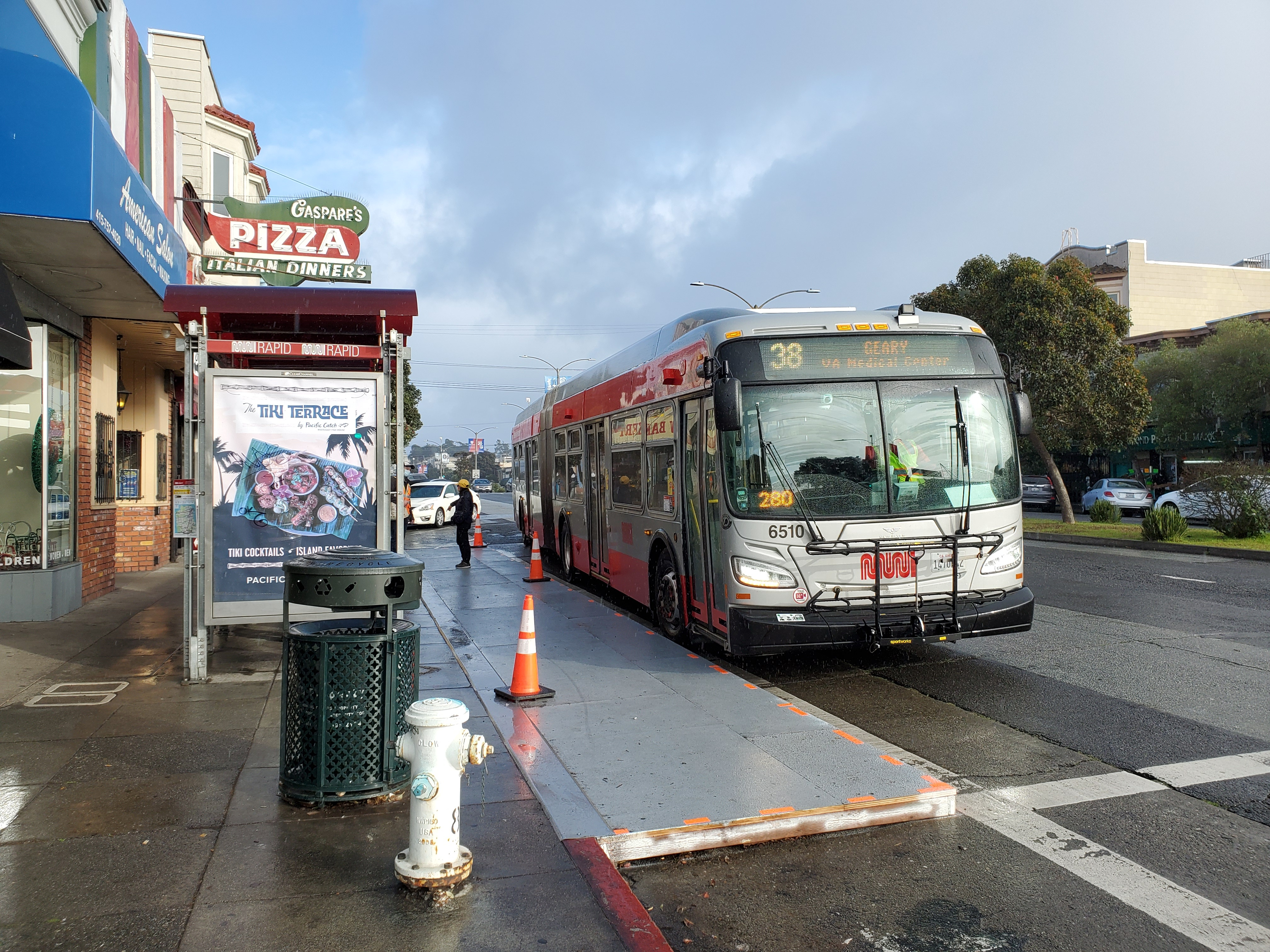
Bus bulb on Geary Boulevard in San Francisco

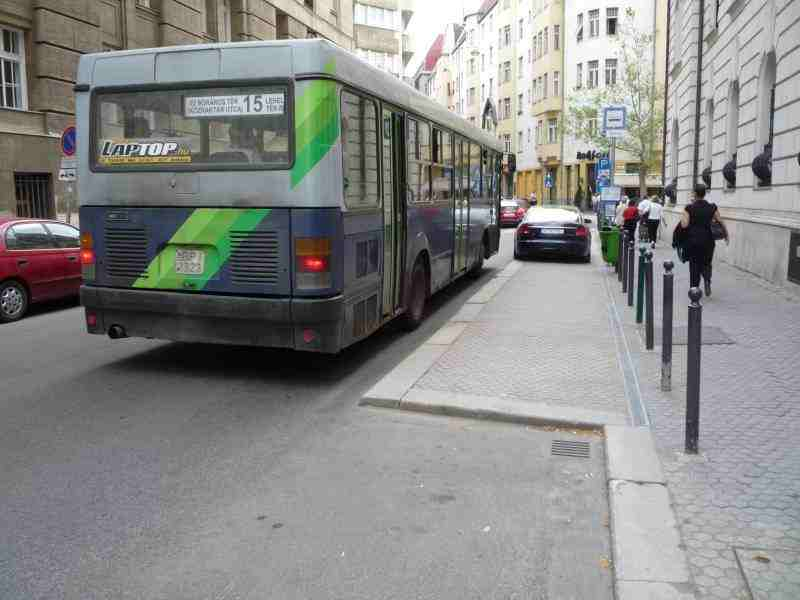
Bus bulb in Budapest (Honvéd utca)

A bus bulb, also called a bus boarder, bus border, bumpout, bus cape, or a kerb outstand is an arrangement by which a sidewalk or pavement is extended outwards for a bus stop; typically the bus bulb replaces roadway that would otherwise be part of a parking lane. With bus bulbs or boarders, a bus can stay in its traffic lane to discharge and pick up passengers, instead of having to pull over to the curb.

The term bus bulb is prevalent in North American usage, whilst bus boarder or bus border is used elsewhere.

A bus bulb or boarder can be considered as a specific form of curb extension, although that term is more normally used to describe a sidewalk extension for the purposes of traffic calming or other traffic management purposes.

== Benefits ==
Benefits include preventing buses from being delayed by having to pull back into traffic, reducing risk of traffic collisions, reducing pedestrian exposure in crosswalks (if provided at the same location), reducing sidewalk congestion, providing space for bus patron amenities including bus shelters, and traffic calming. The protrusion also facilitates easier full length alignment of a bus entrance with a raised kerb stop, especially to allow level boarding in the case of low-floor buses.

Bus bulbs also retain more parking when compared to a bus stop located in a parking lane, as a bus stop so located requires run-in and run-out tapers. Together these tapers may take up as much space as the actual stop, requiring parking to be prohibited over a longer length of road than with a bulb, where cars can park immediately on either side of the bus stop itself.

== Interaction with bicycles ==
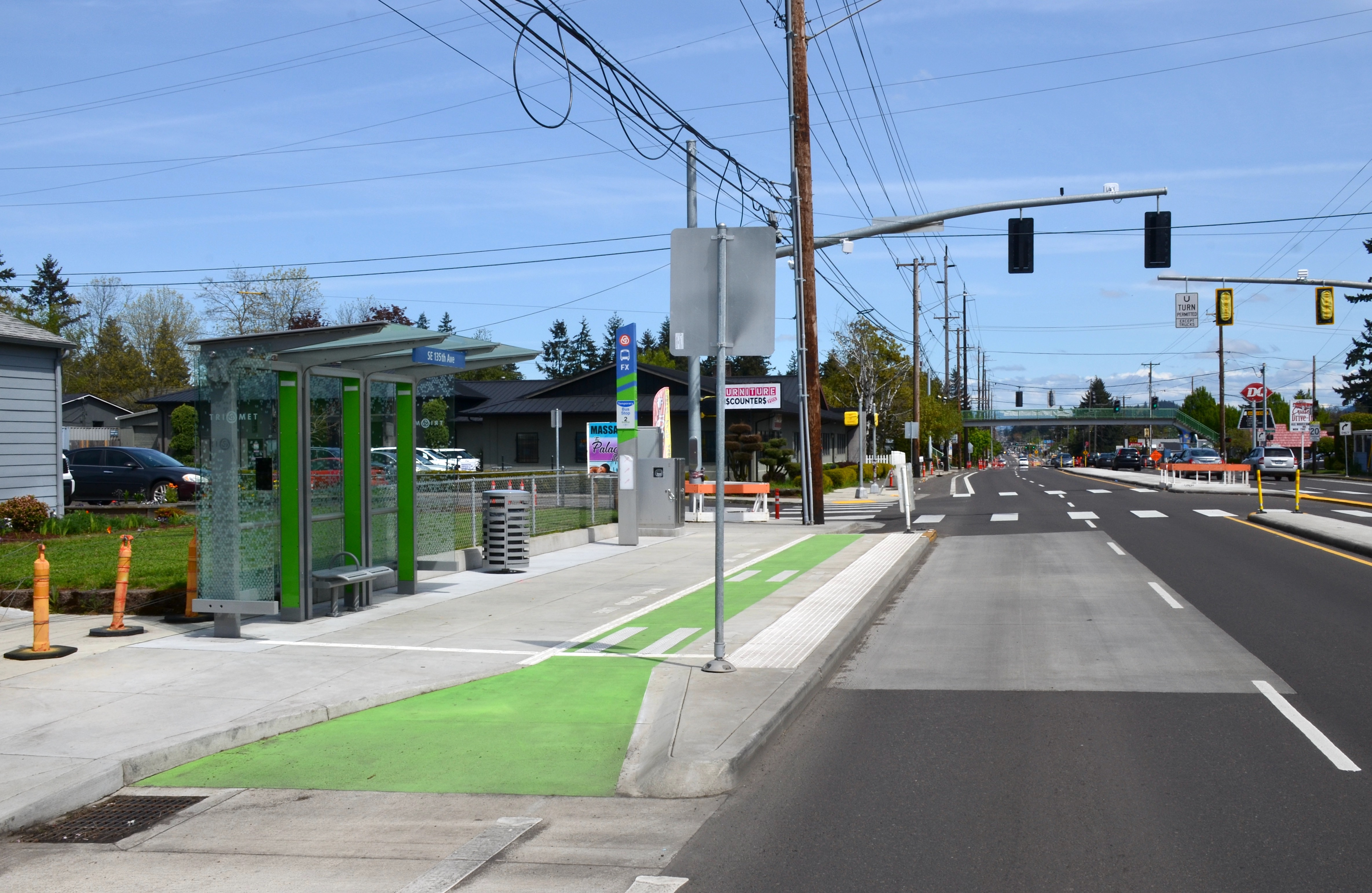
Bus bulb integrated with a bike lane in Portland, Oregon

Standard bus bulbs can create safety hazards for cyclists. In a standard bus bulb design, the narrowing of the road can create danger for cyclists by making them merge back into traffic.

To resolve this issue, multiple designs exist to integrate bike lanes into bus bulbs. The National Association of City Transportation Officials recommends two types of modified bus bulbs that integrate with bike lanes: "boarding islands" and "shared boarding areas." The "boarding island" design routes the bike lane behind the bus bulb, and the "shared boarding area" design uses a ramp to route the bike lane through the bus bulb. Both designs require cyclists to yield to passengers boarding and disembarking at the stop.

== Impact on car traffic ==
Where more than one lane exists in one direction, modelling has shown that there is no additional delay overall for following drivers, since the buses have shorter dwell times (there is less time spent pulling back into traffic) and since following vehicles may use the second lane for passing.

== Tram and streetcar bulbs ==
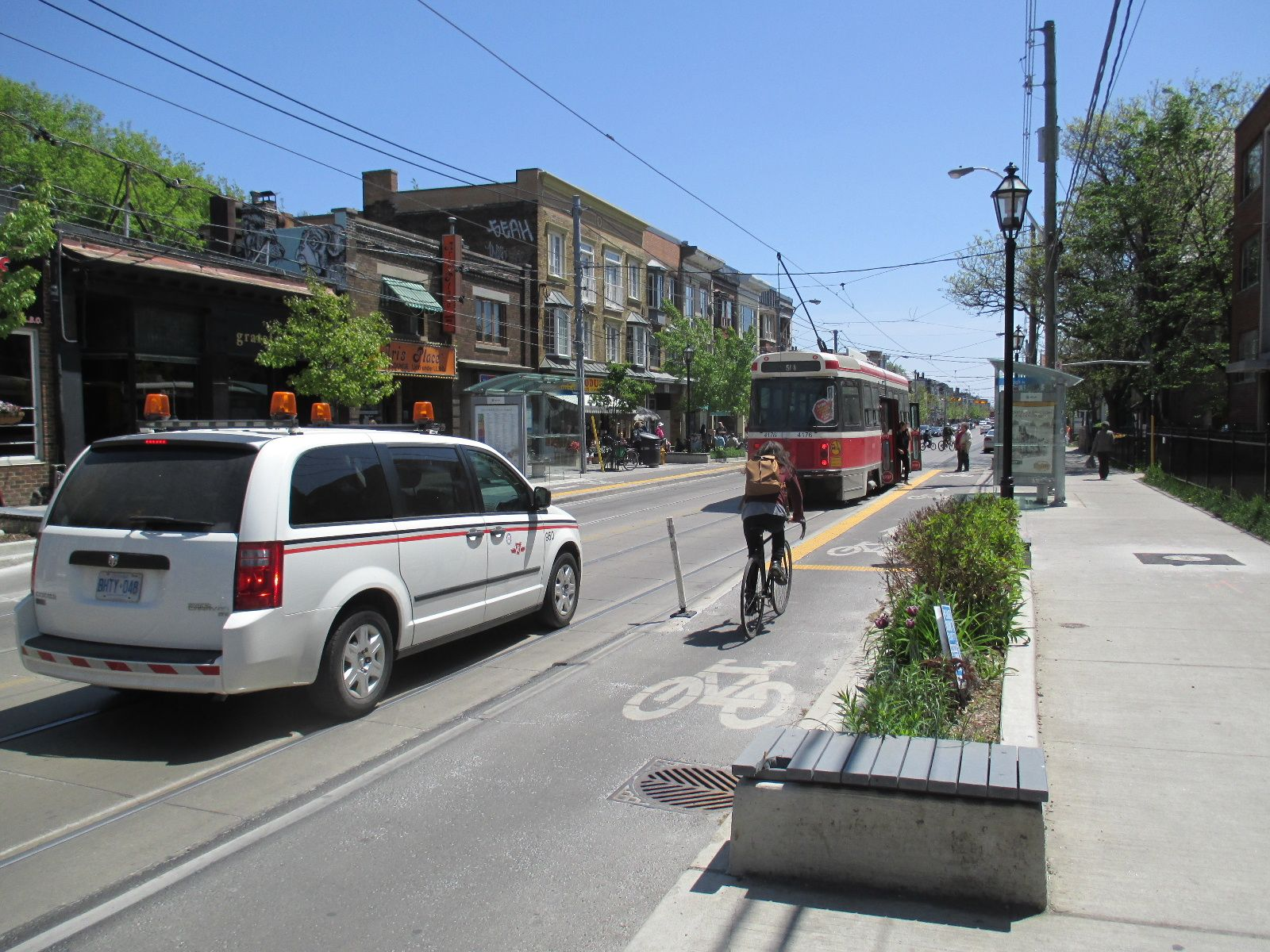
Bumpout or bulb in Toronto serving streetcar riders and cyclists

Some tram and streetcar systems use similar bulbs, such as the Brussels tram network, the Hongkong Tramways, the Melbourne tram network and the Toronto streetcar system.

The latter, which operates mostly on traditional streetcar tracks in mixed traffic with cars, and has frequent request stops similar to bus routes, is introducing bulbs at some high-traffic stops and transfer points that have been recently renovated, notably on Roncesvalles Avenue. The first bulbs (called bumpouts locally) along Roncesvalles Avenue also accommodate cyclists, as the bike lane running parallel to the streetcar tracks would gently rise up from the road level to run on top of the bumpout. When the streetcar is boarding, cyclists have to stop behind the yellow line to allow riders on and off. There are three expected goals for these bulbs:

- Prevent vehicles from parking in front of streetcar stops.
- Increase standing room on the often restricted sidewalks at stop locations in some of the densest regions of the city.
- Improve safety for passengers boarding and alighting at these stops; unmodified stops require passengers to step into traffic to board/alight. The safety concerns are mostly with regard to drivers who are inexperienced at driving among streetcars in mixed traffic.

Streetcar bulbs may also be beneficial at higher-capacity stops along other streetcar routes, and may be rolled out in conjunction with longer streetcars on the route. These bulbs are also featured in the westbound of Johnston Road, as well as southbound Percival Street and westbound Catchick Street in Victoria City, Hong Kong Island, on the Hongkong Tramways.

== See also ==
- Bus turnout
- Bus lane
- Bus stop
