= Muni Metro =

Light rail system in San Francisco, California

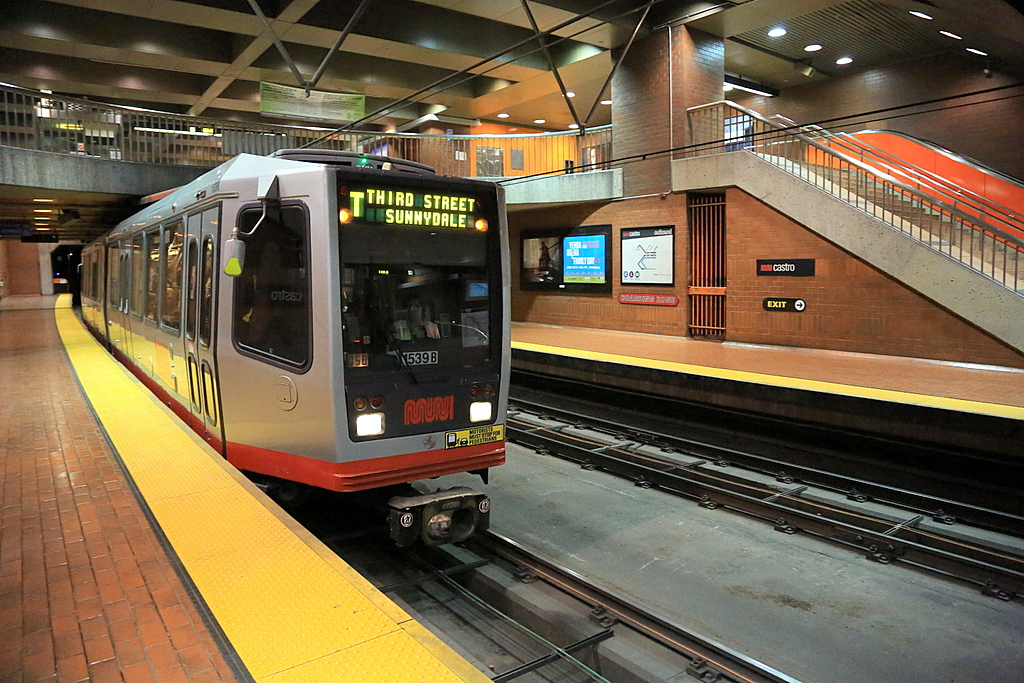
- An inbound T Third Street train at Castro station in 2013

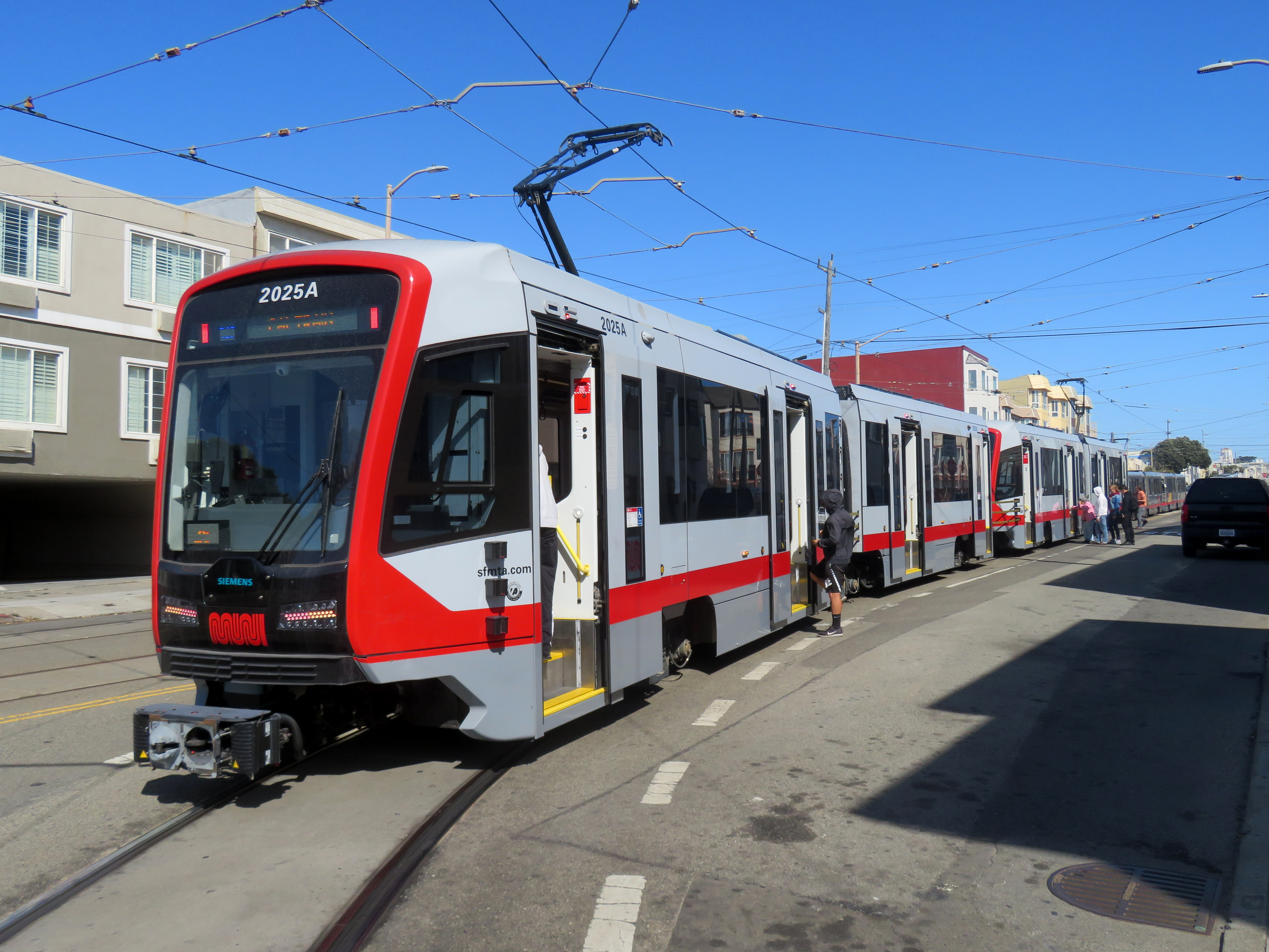
- An inbound N Judah train at 48th Avenue in 2019

Overview
- Owner: San Francisco Municipal Transportation Agency
- Locale: San Francisco, California
- Transit type: Light rail
- Number of lines: 7
- Number of stations: 117
- Daily ridership: 125,100 (weekdays, Q2 2026) (Note: Ridership is for all light rail lines, including the heritage streetcars (E & F))
- Annual ridership: 34,229,500 (2025)
- Website: sfmta.com/munimetro

Operation
- Began operation: February 18, 1980
- Operator: San Francisco Municipal Railway
- Number of vehicles: 249 Siemens LRV4 (on order)
- Train length: 75–150 ft (23–46 m) (1–2 LRVs)

Technical
- System length: 38.9 mi (62.6 km)
- Track gauge: 4 ft 8 1/2 in (1,435 mm) standard gauge
- Electrification: Overhead line, 600 V DC
- Average speed: 9.6 mph (15.4 km/h)
- Top speed: 50 mph (80 km/h)
System map
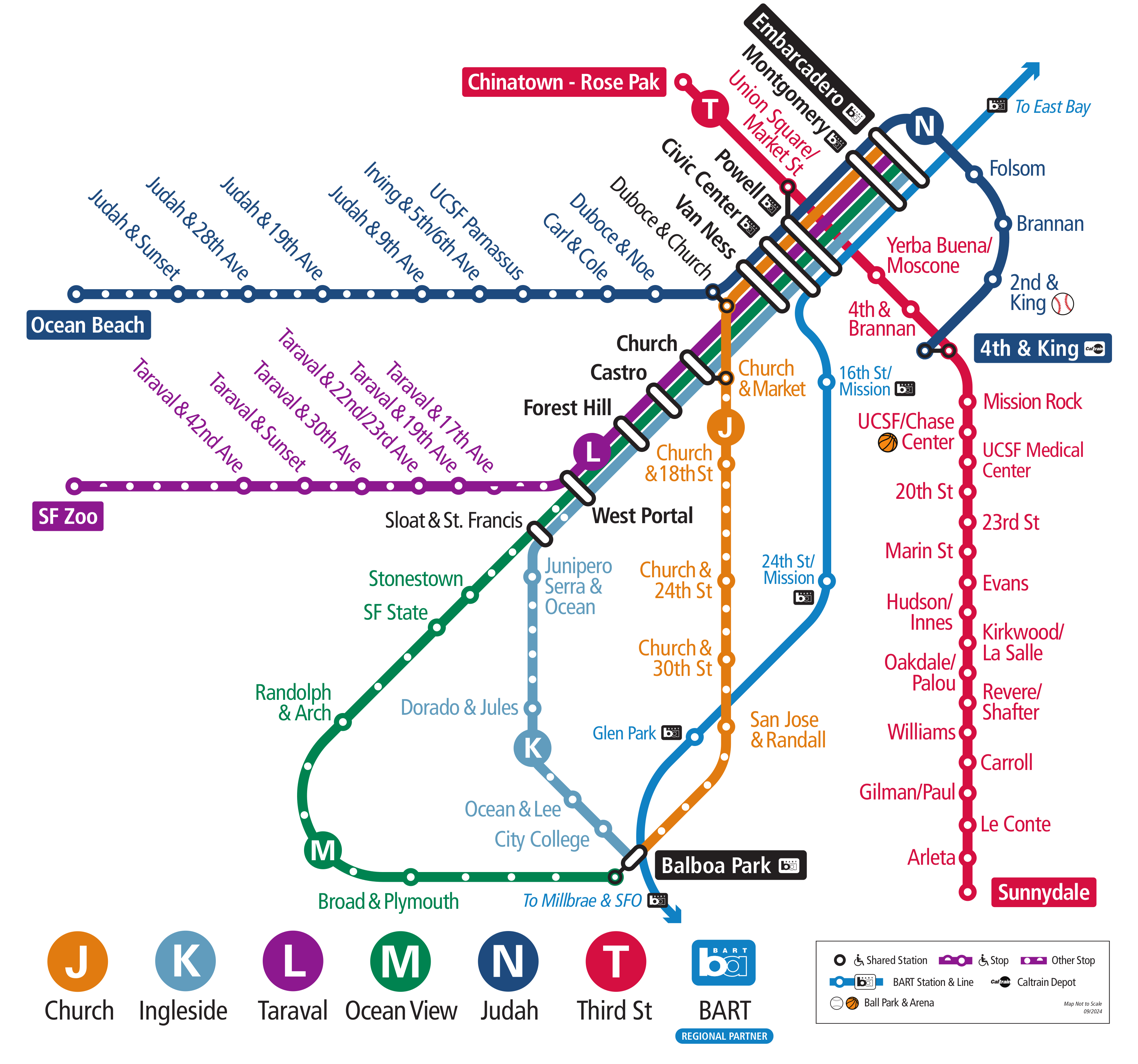
Key

Muni Metro is a light rail system serving San Francisco, California, United States. Operated by the San Francisco Municipal Railway (Muni), a part of the San Francisco Municipal Transportation Agency (SFMTA), Muni's light rail lines saw an average of 125,100 boardings per day as of the second quarter of 2026 and a total of 34,229,500 boardings in 2025, making it the fifth-busiest light rail system in the United States.

Five services—J Church, K Ingleside, L Taraval, M Ocean View, and N Judah—run on separate surface alignments and merge into a single east–west tunnel, the Market Street subway. The T Third Street uses a north–south tunnel downtown, the Central Subway. The supplementary S Shuttle service operates within the Market Street subway and Twin Peaks Tunnel. Muni Metro operates a fleet of 249 Siemens S200 LRVs. The system has 117 stations, of which 63 (54%) are accessible.

Muni Metro is one of the surviving first-generation streetcar systems in North America. The San Francisco Municipal Railway was created in 1909 and opened its first streetcar lines in 1912. Five of the current lines were added in the following decades: the J in 1917, the K (including the Twin Peaks Tunnel) in 1918, the L in 1919, the M in 1925, and the N in 1928. The other Municipal Railway streetcar lines, and those of the privately owned Market Street Railway, were converted to buses in the 1920s to 1950s, but these five lines were retained as streetcars because of their private rights of way. The system was converted to light rail, with larger US Standard Light Rail Vehicles, in the late 1970s and early 1980s. This included the opening of the Market Street subway as well as an extension of three lines to Balboa Park station. An extension along The Embarcadero to the Caltrain terminal at 4th and King Street opened in 1998. The T Third Street line opened in 2007, serving the southeastern portion of the city. The Central Subway, with three new subway stations and one new surface station, opened on November 19, 2022.

== History ==
=== Beginnings ===
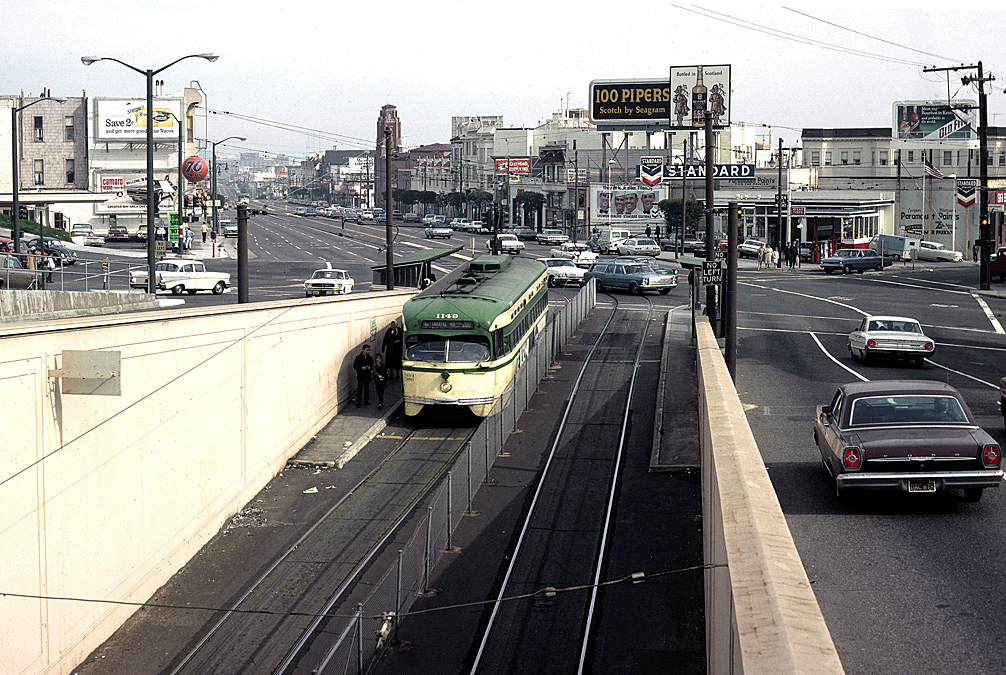
An outbound L Taraval PCC car entering the (now demolished) eastern portal of the Twin Peaks Tunnel, February 1967

The first street railroad in San Francisco was the San Francisco Market Street Railroad Company, which was incorporated in 1857 and began operating in 1860, with track along Market Street from California to Mission Dolores. Muni Metro descended from the municipally owned traditional streetcar system started on December 28, 1912, when the San Francisco Municipal Railway (Muni) was established. The first streetcar line, the A Geary, ran from Kearny and Market Streets in the Financial District to Fulton Street and 10th Avenue in the Richmond District. The system slowly expanded, opening the Twin Peaks Tunnel in 1917, allowing streetcars to run to the southwestern quadrant of the city. By 1921, the city was operating 304 miles (489 km) of electric trolley lines and 25 miles (40 km) of cable car lines. The last line to start service before 2007 was the N Judah, which started service after the Sunset Tunnel opened in 1928.

In the 1940s and 1950s, as in many North American cities, public transit in San Francisco was consolidated under the aegis of a single municipal corporation, which then began phasing out much of the streetcar network in favor of buses. However, five heavily used streetcar lines traveled for at least part of their routes through tunnels or otherwise reserved right-of-way, and thus could not be converted to bus lines. As a result, these lines, running PCC streetcars, continued in operation.

=== Market Street subway ===
Original plans for the BART system drawn up in the 1950s envisioned a double-decked subway tunnel under Market Street (known as the Market Street subway) in downtown San Francisco; the lower deck would be dedicated to express trains, while the upper would be served by local trains whose routes would spread south and west through the city. However, by 1961 these plans were altered; only a single BART route would travel through the city on the lower deck, while the upper deck would be served by the existing Muni streetcar routes. The new tunnel would be connected to the existing Twin Peaks Tunnel. The new underground stations would feature high platforms, and the older stations would be retrofitted with the same, which meant that the PCC cars could not be used in them. Hence, a fleet of new light rail vehicles was ordered from Boeing-Vertol, but were not delivered until 1979–80, even though the tunnel was completed in 1978. The K and M lines were extended to Balboa Park during this time, providing further connections to BART. (The J line also saw an extension there in 1991, which provided yet another BART connection at Glen Park.)

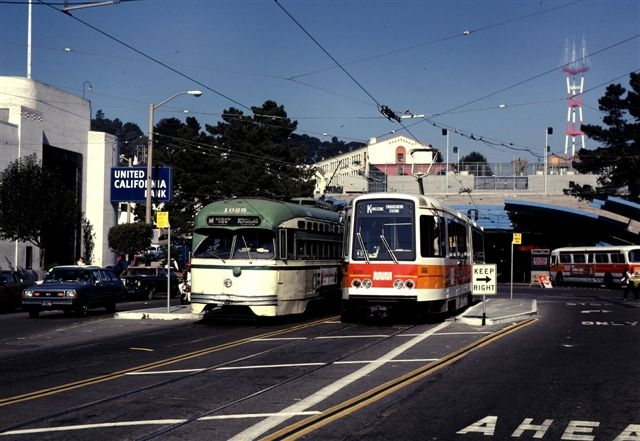
K Ingleside USSLRV passes an M Ocean View PCC car at West Portal, November 1980.

On February 18, 1980, the Muni Metro was officially inaugurated, with weekday N line service in the subway. The Metro service was implemented in phases, and the subway was served only on weekdays until 1982. The K Ingleside line began using the entire Metro subway on weekdays on June 11, 1980, the L Taraval and M Ocean View lines on December 17, 1980, and lastly the J Church line on June 17, 1981.

Meanwhile, weekend service on all five lines (J, K, L, M, N) continued to use PCC cars operating on the surface of Market Street through to the Transbay Terminal, and the Muni Metro was closed on weekends. At the end of the service day September 19, 1982, streetcar operations on the surface of Market Street were discontinued entirely, the remaining PCC cars taken out of service, and weekend service on the five light rail lines was temporarily converted to buses. Finally, on November 20, 1982, the Muni Metro subway began operating seven days a week.

At the time, there were no firm plans to revive any service on the surface of Market Street or return PCC cars to regular running. However, tracks were rehabilitated for the 1983 Historic Trolley Festival, and the inauguration of the F line, served by heritage streetcars, followed in 1995.

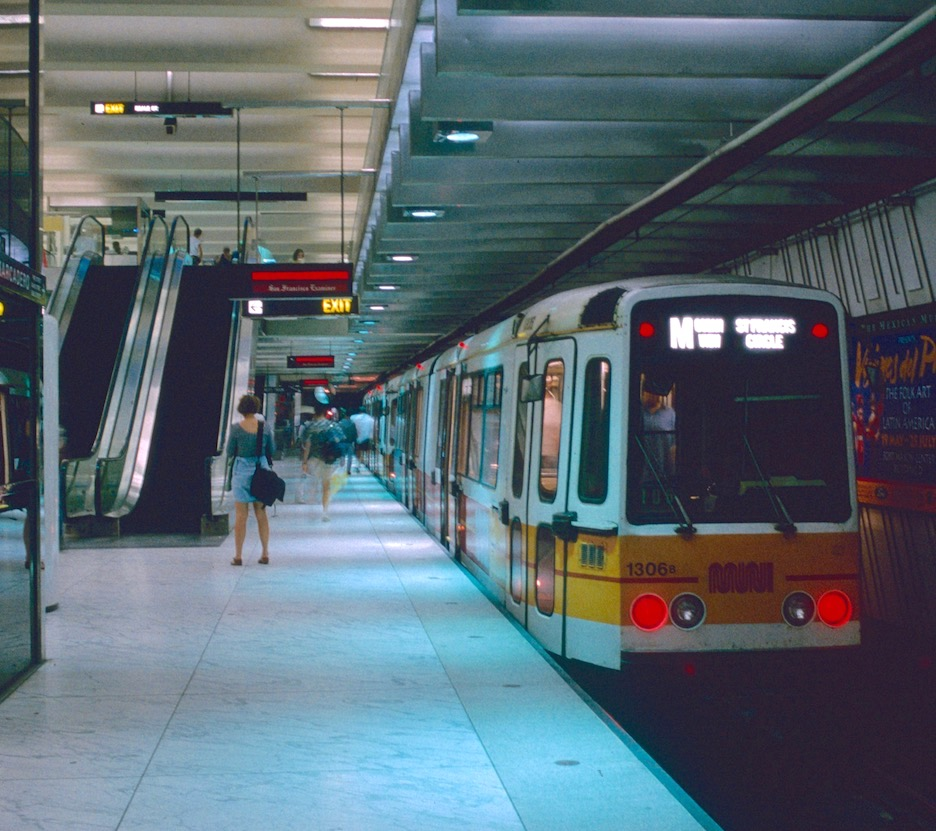
A train of Boeing USSLRVs at Embarcadero station, August 1993

By the late 1980s, Muni scheduled 20 trains per hour (TPH) through the Market Street subway at peak periods, with all trains using the crossover west of Embarcadero station to reverse direction. To allow for high frequencies on the surface branches, eastbound trains were combined at West Portal and Duboce Portal, and westbound trains split at those locations. Two-car N Judah trains and one-car J Church trains (each 10TPH) combined at the Duboce Portal, while two-car L Taraval trains (10TPH) alternately combined with two-car M Ocean View and K Ingleside (each 5 TPH) trains at West Portal to form four-car trains. However, this provided suboptimal service; many inbound trains did not arrive at the portals in time to combine into longer trains.

=== Muni meltdown ===
In the mid to late 1990s, San Francisco grew more prosperous and its population expanded with the advent of the dot-com boom, and the Metro system began to feel the strain of increased commuter demand. Muni criticism had been something of a feature of life in San Francisco, and not without reason. The Boeing trains were sub-par and grew crowded quickly, and the difficulty in running a hybrid streetcar and light rail system—with five lines merging into one—led to scheduling problems on the main trunk lines with long waits between arrivals and commuter-packed trains sometimes sitting motionless underground for extended periods of time.

Muni did take steps to address these problems. Newer, larger Breda cars were ordered, an extension of the system towards South Beach—where many of the new dot-coms were headquartered—was built, and the underground section was switched to Automatic Train Control (ATC). The Breda cars, however, came in noisy, overweight, oversized, under-braked, and over-budget (their price grew from US$2.2 million per car to nearly US$3 million over the course of their production).

In fact, the new trains were so heavy (10,000 pounds (4,500 kg) more than the Boeing LRVs they replaced) that some homeowners, claiming that the exceptional weight of the Breda cars damaged their foundations, sued the city of San Francisco. The Breda cars were longer and wider than the previous Boeing cars, necessitating the modification of subway stations and maintenance yards, as well as the rear view mirrors on the trains themselves. Furthermore, the Breda cars could not be operated in three-car trains, as the Boeing cars had been, as doing so, in some instances, physically damaged the overhead power wires. The Breda trains were so noisy that San Francisco budgeted over $15 million to quiet them down, while estimates range up to $1 million per car to remedy the excessive noise. Throughout their service lives the Breda cars remained noisier than the PCC and Boeing cars. In 1998, federal inspectors mandated a lower speed limit of 30 mph (48 km/h), down from 50 mph (80 km/h), because the brakes were problematic.

The ATC system was plagued by numerous glitches when first implemented, initially causing significantly more harm than good. Common occurrences included sending trains down the wrong tracks, and, more often, inappropriately applying emergency braking. Eventually the result was a spectacular service crisis, widely referred to as the "Muni meltdown", in the summer of 1998. During this period, two reporters for the San Francisco Chronicle—one riding in the Muni Metro subway and one on foot on the surface—held a race through downtown, with the walking reporter emerging the winner.

After initial problems with the ATC were fixed, substantial upgrades to the entire Muni transit systems have gone a long way towards resolving persistent crowding and scheduling issues. Nonetheless, Muni remains one of the slowest urban transport systems in the United States.

=== Recent expansions ===
In 1980, the M Ocean View was extended from Broad Street and Plymouth Avenue to its current terminus at Balboa Park. In 1991, the J Church was extended from Church and 30th Streets to its current terminus at Balboa Park. In 1998, the service was extended from Embarcadero Station on the surface along the Embarcadero, running past the planned site of the new Pacific Bell Park to Caltrain Depot; the extension was briefly served between January and August of that year by the temporary E Embarcadero shuttle before being integrated into the N Judah. (The E Embarcadero was restored in 2015 as a heritage streetcar line.)

In 2007, the T Third Street, running south from Caltrain Depot along Third Street to the southern edge of the city, opened as part of the Third Street Light Rail Project. Limited weekend T line service began on January 13, 2007, while full service began on April 7, 2007. The line initially ran from the southern terminus at Bayshore Boulevard and Sunnydale Street to Castro Street Station in the north. The line ran into initial problems with breakdowns, bottlenecks, and power failures, creating massive delays.

Service changes to address complaints with the introduction of the T Third Street were implemented on June 30, 2007, when the K and T trains were interlined, or effectively merged into one single line with route designations changing at the entrances into the subway (T became K outbound at Embarcadero; K became T inbound at West Portal).

The Central Subway runs between Chinatown station in Chinatown and a portal in South of Market (SoMa), with intermediate stops at Union Square/Market Street station in Union Square and Yerba Buena/Moscone station in SoMa. A surface portion runs through SoMa to connect to the existing T Third Street line at 4th and King station. Muni estimates that the Central Subway section of the T Third Street line will carry roughly 35,100 riders per day by 2030. Originally set to open in late 2018, the subway opened with weekend-only shuttle service on November 19, 2022. Full service as part of the T Third Street line began on January 7, 2023. Additional shuttle trains signed "S Chase Center" will operate between Chinatown and UCSF/Chase Center for events at Chase Center.

=== COVID-19 pandemic ===
2020 Muni Metro system map showing the combination of the K/L and the M/T lines

On March 30, 2020, Muni Metro service was replaced with buses due to the COVID-19 pandemic. The SFMTA reopened rail service on August 22, 2020, but returned to bus substitution three days later, citing malfunctioning overhead wire splices and the need to quarantine control center staff after a COVID-19 case.

During this brief time, routes were reconfigured to improve reliability in the subway:

- J Church service operated as an only-surface route between Balboa Park and Church and Market, requiring transfers to the Market Street subway at Church station.
- K Ingleside and L Taraval service was interlined as the LK, running between Taraval and Sunset and Balboa Park; no J, K, or L service entered the subway. Light-rail service west of Sunset Boulevard was replaced by buses to allow for construction. Transfers were required at West Portal station.
- M Ocean View and T Third Street service was interlined as the TM, running between Sunnydale and Balboa Park.
- S Shuttle service was increased, running with the TM and N in the subway.

Advocates with local nonprofit Senior and Disability Action criticized this route configuration, expressing concern over the need to transfer at West Portal and Church stations. In November 2020, the SFMTA that announced some rail lines such as the N Judah and T Third would likely return in early 2021, followed by a gradual return to full operation. Kirschbaum said the agency was reconsidering its approach to maintenance after the botched attempt to reopen in August, and that it might take 5 to 8 years to fully address the system's vulnerabilities. Among the most urgent issues was replacing the track ballast in the Twin Peaks Tunnel, which was meant to be replaced during a maintenance project in 2018 but was instead reused at that time. City supervisors harshly criticized the mistake, which SFMTA director Jeffrey Tumlin blamed on a "culture of fear" he was working to correct since becoming the agency's leader in 2019.

The surface-only (from Market Street to Balboa Park) J Church route resumed service on December 19, 2020, followed by the Embarcadero–Sunnydale portion of the T Third Street on January 23, 2021. N Judah and K Ingleside light rail service resumed on May 15, 2021, with the K and T again interlined, along with S Shuttle service now converted to supplementary. At that time, some stations were converted to new wayfinding signage based on international standards, with compass directions like "westbound" replacing older "inbound"/"outbound" directions. M Ocean View light rail service resumed on August 14, 2021. The L remained served by buses due to a multi-year reconstruction on the surface section of the line until it resumed train service on September 28, 2024. Service only ran until 9pm until October 2, 2021, when it was extended to 10pm on Sundays and midnight on other days to better align with BART's late-night service. J Church service resumed subway service on February 19, 2022.

=== Future ===
Several further expansions have been proposed. SFMTA has studied extending the Central Subway as an above-ground light rail line or subway through North Beach, and into the Marina district, with the possibility of eventually terminating in the Presidio.

Starting in 2017, the SFMTA, in collaboration with other city agencies, began its ConnectSF process to plan its vision for future transit expansions that would follow its then under construction projects such as Van Ness BRT and the Central Subway. The final report on transit from the ConnectSF program was released in 2021 and identified two major corridors for Muni Metro expansion: a subway line along the Geary Boulevard and 19th Avenue corridor connecting to Daly City, and the extension of the Central Subway to Fisherman's Wharf that had already undergone preliminary analysis. The Geary/19th corridor would replace earlier efforts to plan a standalone Geary subway line, such as in the 2017 20-year Capital Plan, and the planning effort started in 2014 (called the Muni Subway Expansion Project) to extend the M Ocean View in a fully grade-separated right-of-way to better serve the 19th Avenue corridor that had begun preliminary engineering studies in 2018.

The ConnectSF report also identified the need to modernize the Muni Metro system. Key improvements that are planned include a new train control system that utilizes communications-based train control and infrastructure improvements that would enable longer trains to run in the subway and on some surface lines with greater reliability. As of 2024, the train control system replacement was in the planning stages with a pilot implementation planned in 2025 and with the entire upgrade estimated to be completed in 2029. The SFMTA board approved a $212 million design and procurement contract and a $114 million ten-year support contract with Hitachi Rail in October 2024.

== Infrastructure ==
The Muni Metro system consists of 71.5 miles (115.1 km) of standard-gauge track, seven light rail lines (six regular lines and one peak-hour line), three tunnels, 12 subway stations, 25 surface stations, and 87 surface stops.

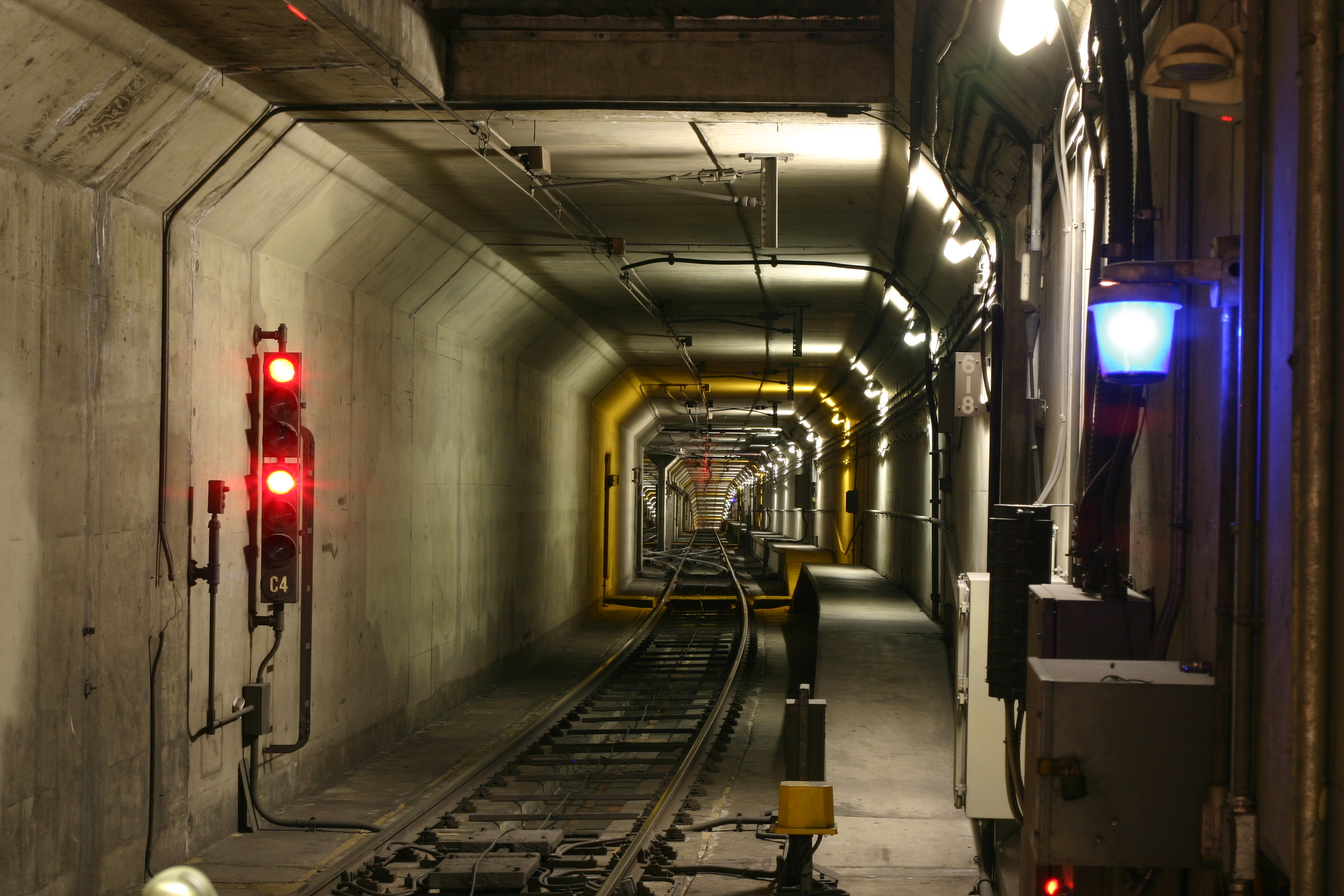
Eastern portion of Twin Peaks Tunnel

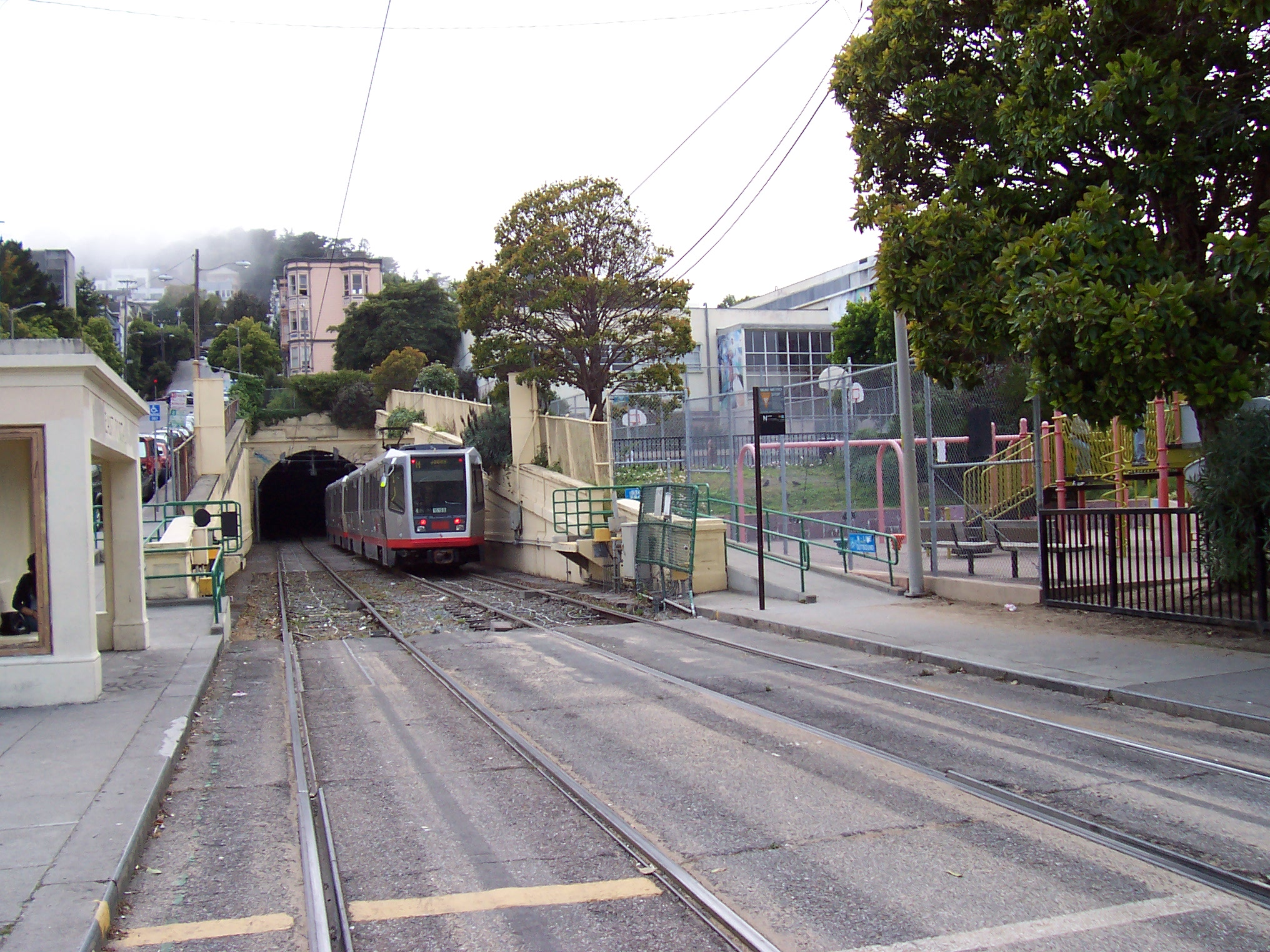
N Judah entering the eastern portal of the Sunset Tunnel

The backbone of the system is formed by two interconnected subway tunnels, the older Twin Peaks Tunnel and the newer Market Street subway, both controlled by automatic train operation systems to run trains with the operators closing the door to allow the train to pull out of a station. This ATO system was upgraded in 2015 to replace outdated software and relays. The tunnels, 5.5 miles (8.9 km) in total length, run from West Portal Station in the southwestern part of the city to Embarcadero Station in the heart of the Financial District. Three lines—the K Ingleside, the L Taraval, and the M Ocean View—feed into the tunnel at West Portal, while two lines, the J Church and N Judah, enter at a portal near Church Street and Duboce Avenue in the Duboce Triangle neighborhood. The N Judah enters and exits the tunnel at Embarcadero. The T Third Street is the only line in the Muni Metro that does not enter the tunnel, instead going through the Central Subway. An additional tunnel, the Sunset Tunnel, is located near the Duboce portal and is served by the N.

The interconnected tunnels contain nine subway stations. Three stations—West Portal, Forest Hill and the now-defunct Eureka Valley—were opened in 1918 as part of the Twin Peaks Tunnel, while the other seven—Castro Street, Church Street, Van Ness, Civic Center, Powell Street, Montgomery Street and Embarcadero—were opened in 1980 as part of the Market Street subway. Four stations, Civic Center, Powell Street, Montgomery Street, and Embarcadero, are shared with Bay Area Rapid Transit (BART), with Muni Metro on the upper level and BART on the lower one.

Above ground, there are twenty-four surface platform stations. Two stations, Stonestown and San Francisco State University, are located at the southwestern part of the city, while the rest are located on the eastern side of the city, where the system underwent recent expansion as part of the Embarcadero extension and the Third Street Light Rail Project. However, many of the stops on the system are surface stops consisting of anything from a traffic island to a yellow-banded "Car Stop" sign painted on a utility pole.

All subway and surface stations are accessible to people with disabilities. Because the system uses high-floor vehicles, while operating as a streetcar, the vehicles are not accessible to people with disabilities that impact their mobility. A select number of stops, typically located near major intersections, are equipped with ramps or lifts, for people with disabilities.

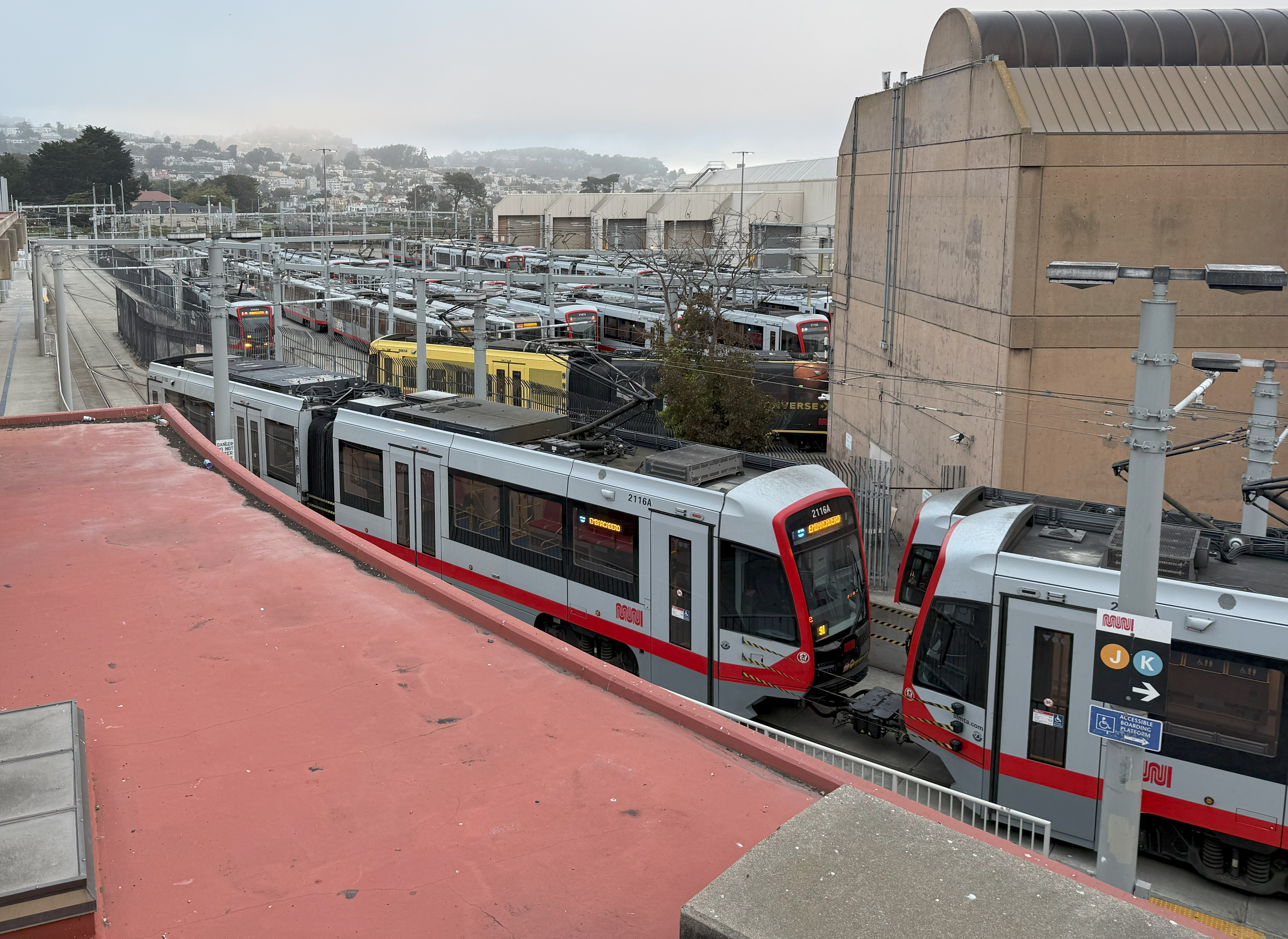
Green Yard in 2025

Muni Metro has two rail yards for storage and maintenance:

- Green Yard or Curtis E. Green Light Rail Center at 425 Geneva Avenue is located adjacent to Balboa Park Station and serves as the outbound terminus for the J Church, K Ingleside, and M Ocean View. The facility has repair facilities, an outdoor storage yard and larger carhouse structure. The facility was renamed for former and late head of Muni in 1987.
- Muni Metro East is a newer facility opened in 2008 and is located along the Central Waterfront on Illinois and 25th Streets in the Potrero Hill neighborhood, a block from the T Third Street line. The 180,000-square-foot (17,000 m^{2}) maintenance facility with outdoor storage area is located next to Northern Container Terminal and former Army Pier.

== Routes ==
| Line | Year opened | Termini | |
| Line | Year opened | Eastbound/southbound | Westbound/northbound |
|---|---|---|---|
| J Church | 1917 | Embarcadero station | Balboa Park station |
| K Ingleside | 1918 | Embarcadero station | Balboa Park station |
| L Taraval | 1919 | Embarcadero station | Wawona and 46th Avenue (SF Zoo) station |
| M Ocean View | 1925 | Embarcadero station | San Jose and Geneva (Balboa Park) station |
| N Judah | 1928 | 4th and King station | Judah and La Playa (Ocean Beach) station |
| S Shuttle | 2001 | Embarcadero station | West Portal station |
| T Third Street | 2007 | Sunnydale station | Chinatown station |

== Rolling stock ==
Rolling stock comparison
| Manufacturer | Boeing Vertol | Breda | Siemens |
| Model | US SLRV | San Francisco LRV | S200 SF |
| Muni designation | LRV1 | LRV2/3 (Note: LRV3 cars were delivered starting in 1999; the LRV3s featured some minor design changes that were later retrofitted to the earlier LRV2s.) | LRV4 |
|---|---|---|---|
| Image | | | |
| Dates in Service | 1979–2002 | 1996–2025 | 2017–present |
| Quantity | 131 (Note: Original order of 80 expanded to 100. 31 additional vehicles purchased from a lot of 40 rejected by MBTA, the other operator using SLRVs.) | 151 (Note: Original order of 35 (Dec 1991) expanded to 151 by exercising options: +5 (40 total, Nov 1992); +4 (44 total, May 1993); +8 (52 total, Dec 1993); +25 (77 total, Apr 1996). The last 74 (ordered as +59, Oct 1998; +15, May 1999) were delivered as LRV3 vehicles starting in 1999.) | 249 (Note: Original order of 175 (151 to replace all Breda LRVs, 24 for Central Subway) expanded to 249 by exercising options: +40 (215 total, Jul 2014); +4 (219 total, Jun 2017); and +30 (249 total, Jul 2021).) |
| Trucks/Axles | 3 trucks (2 powered), 6 axles (total) | | |
| Axle arrangement | B-2-B | Bo-2-Bo | |
| Articulations | 1 | | |
| Length | 73 ft (22 m) | 75 ft (23 m) | |
| Width | 8 ft 10 in (2.69 m) | 9 ft (2.74 m) | 8 ft 8 in (2.64 m) |
| Height | 11 ft 6 in (3.51 m) | | |
| Weight (empty) | 67,000 lb (30,000 kg) | 79,580 lb (36,100 kg) | 78,770 lb (35,730 kg) |
| Traction | Chopper control 2 × 210 hp (160 kW) DC motors | GE GTO–VVVF; 4 × 130 hp (97 kW) AC motors | Siemens IGBT–VVVF; 4 × 174 hp (130 kW) AC motors |
| Power | 420 hp (310 kW) | 520 hp (388 kW) | 696 hp (519 kW) |
| Capacity | 68 seated, 219 maximum | 60 seated, 218 maximum | 60 seated, 203 maximum |

=== LRV 1: Boeing Vertol US SLRV (1979–2002) ===
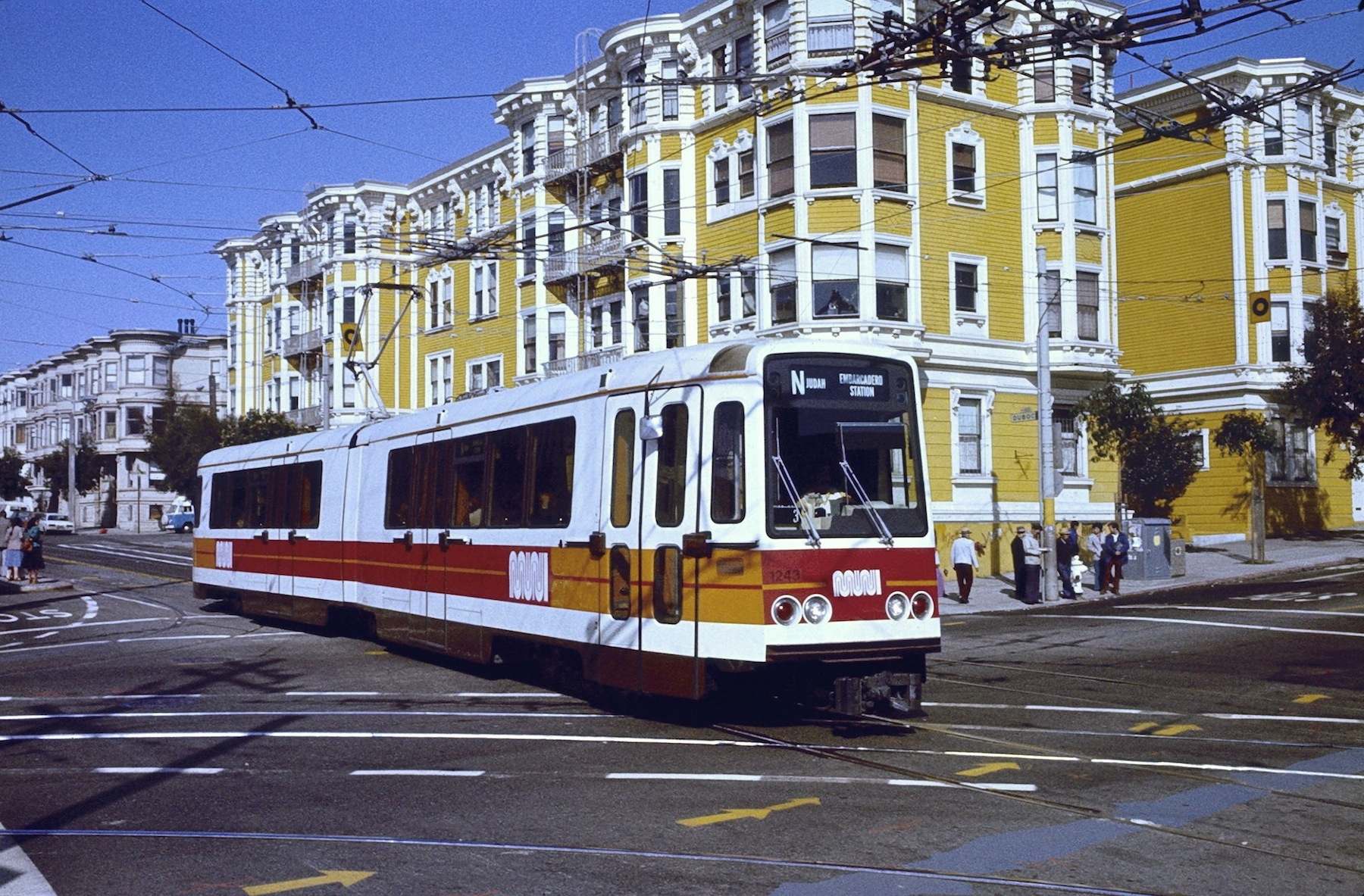
Boeing USSLRV on the N Judah line, on Duboce Avenue at Church Street, about to enter the Market Street Subway, in March 1980, shortly after the opening of the Muni Metro

Muni Metro first operated Boeing Vertol-made US Standard Light Rail Vehicles (USSLRV), which were built for Muni Metro and Boston's MBTA. Boeing had no experience in making LRVs, and has not made another since. The first cars of the initial 100-car order arrived in San Francisco in 1978; Boston had been running the cars since 1976 and by 1978, MBTA was already returning 35 cars for manufacturing defects. After receipt of the first cars, MBTA forced Boeing to make 70 to 80 modifications on each car. Boeing ended up paying US$40,000,000 (equivalent to $226,315,789 in 2025) in damages to Boston. The purchase price for each car was US$333,000 (equivalent to $1,643,763 in 2025).

The federal government offered to provide 80% of the funds for design and production of the USSLRV in exchange for a commitment to keep the cars in service for at least 25 years, but the cars, as-delivered, were prone to jammed doors, defective brakes and motors, leaky roofs, mechanical breakdowns, and were involved in several accidents. Muni Metro added 30 more cars to the fleet; these 30 had been rejected by MBTA after suffering numerous breakdowns.

In 1982, the Boeing cars averaged only 600 miles (970 km) between breakdowns; by 1988 this had improved to 1,800 to 2,000 miles (2,900 to 3,200 km) between breakdowns. In 1998, Rudy Nothenberg, president of the Public Transportation Commission, said the Boeing cars were "impossible to maintain and [...] have many, many design flaws;" that same year, Muni was only able to supply 66–72 working cars for rush-hour service instead of the required 99 cars, resulting in system delays. Despite the shortcomings of the USSLRV design, these cars constituted the entire light rail fleet until 1996, when new Breda-manufactured cars were put into service, replacing Boeing cars as they were accepted for service. By 1998, the 136-car Muni Metro fleet consisted of 57 Boeing Vertol cars and 79 Breda cars.

Two Boeing cars were preserved for potential donation to the San Francisco Railway Museum but have since been scrapped; five were sold to the Greater Manchester Passenger Transport Authority for the modest price of US$200 (equivalent to $358 in 2025) to US$500 (equivalent to $895 in 2025) each; one was acquired by the Oregon Electric Railway Historical Society in 2001, but the Society declined to take any more Boeing cars after experiencing several breakdowns. Boeing car no. 1258 has been on exhibit at the Western Railway Museum near Suisun City since its acquisition in 2002.

=== LRV 2 & LRV 3: Breda (1996–2025) ===
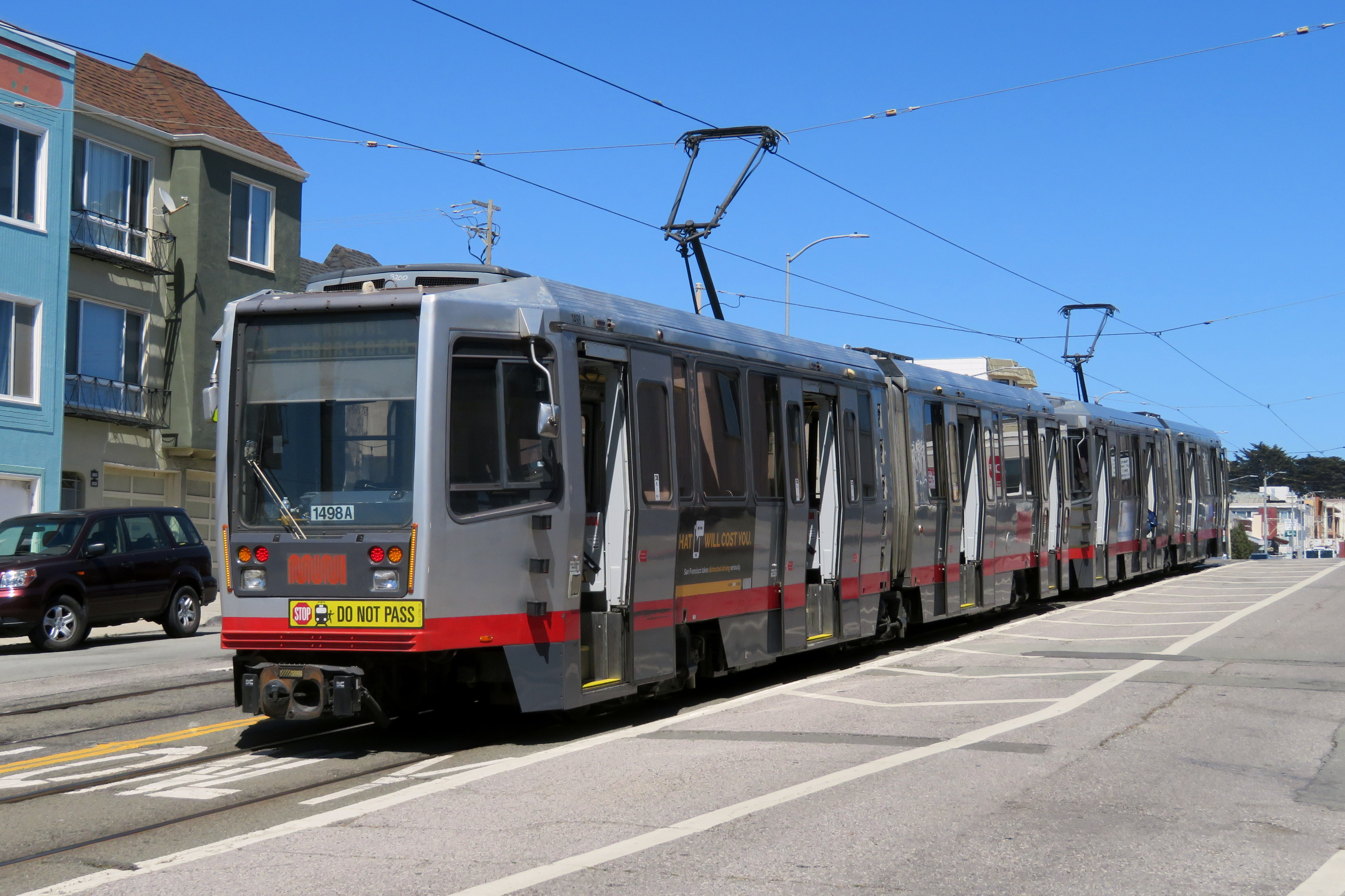
Breda LRV on L Taraval at 42nd Avenue

The first of four prototypes of the new Breda cars was delivered in January 1995. After delivery of additional cars and training of operators, the cars began to enter service on December 10, 1996. They were the most expensive street railway vehicles built to-date, at a cost of US$2,000,000 (equivalent to $4,105,665 in 2025) each, and they were assembled at Pier 80. After suffering initial breakdowns and despite facing complaints of noise and vibrations, the Bredas gradually replaced the Boeings, with the last Boeing car being retired in 2002. Residents along streetcar lines complained the new Breda cars would screech during acceleration and deceleration and their 80,000-pound (36,000 kg) weight, 10,000 pounds (4,500 kg) heavier than the Boeing cars, was blamed for vibration issues. At one point in 1998, 12 Breda cars were unavailable for service due to door problems. Faulty couplers on the Breda cars have been blamed for reduced train capacity, as multiple cars are not able to be coupled together as intended.

Muni originally ordered 35 cars from Breda in 1991, and exercised options to add another 116 cars throughout the 1990s, including an option to purchase another 15 cars in 1999. The fleet had 151 LRVs in 2014, all made by Breda. The double-ended cars are 75 feet (23 m) long, 9 feet (2.7 m) wide, 11 feet (3.4 m) high, have graffiti-resistant windows, and contain an air-conditioning system to maintain a temperature of 72 °F (22 °C) inside the car. The Breda cars feature four doors per car, versus three for the Boeing (only the middle two doors of the Boeing cars were available while in the tunnels due to the cars' end curvature). The initial batch of 136 Breda cars were ordered on contracts exceeding US$320,000,000 (equivalent to $618,457,851 in 2025), for an average per-car cost of US$2,350,000 (equivalent to $4,541,800 in 2025); the option of 15 additional cars was exercised on a contract worth US$42,300,000 (equivalent to $81,752,397 in 2025), making the last batch of 15 cars US$2,600,000 (equivalent to $5,024,970 in 2025) each.

By 2011, the fleet of Breda LRVs was only able to manage a mean distance between failures (MDBF) of 617 miles (993 km).

The last LRV2 was retired in December 2023. The final regular use of the LRV3 fleet was on November 12, 2025. LRV3 #1534 is preserved at the Western Railway Museum.

=== LRV 4: Siemens S200 SF (2017–present) ===
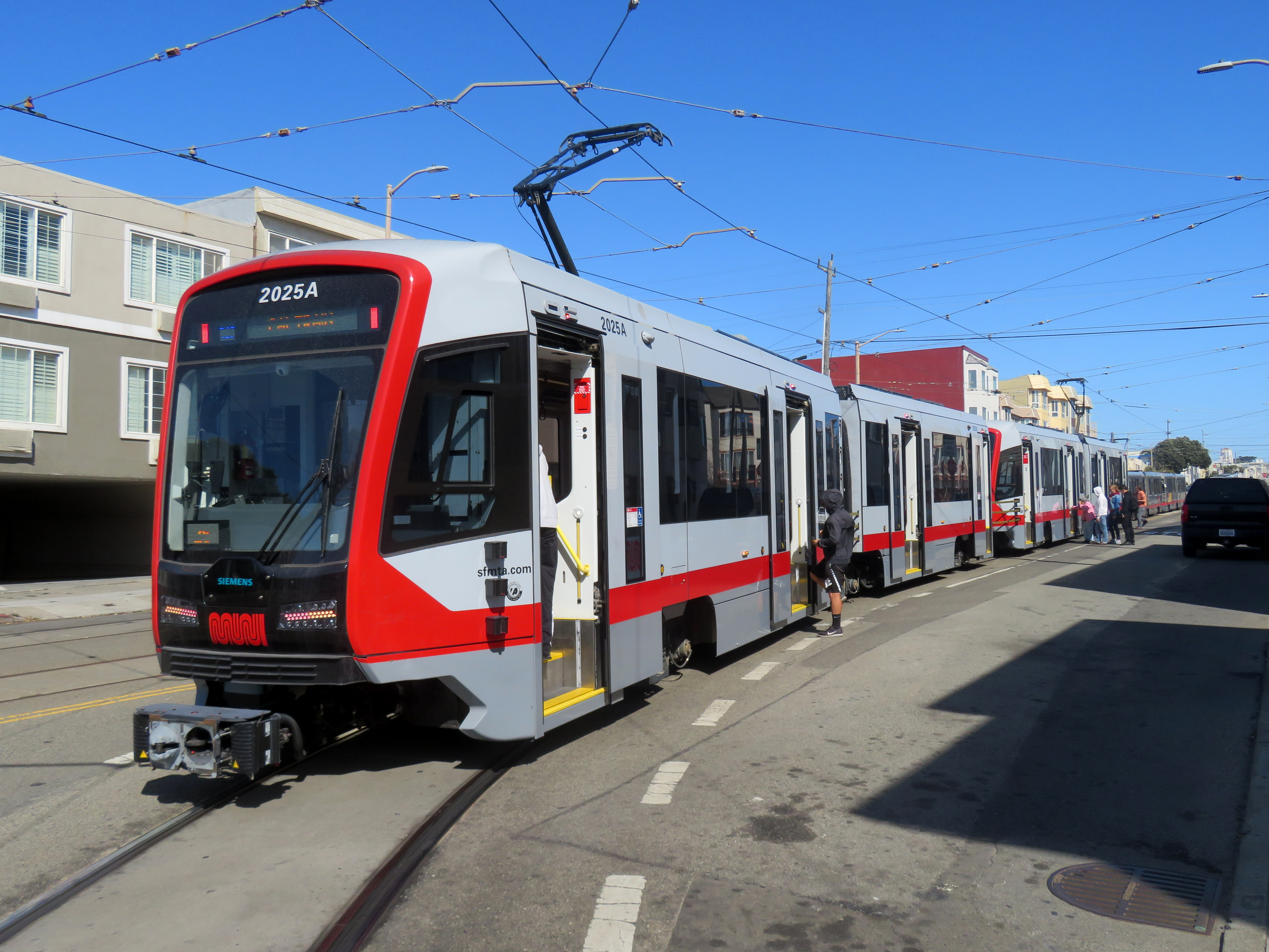
LRV4 train on the N Judah line

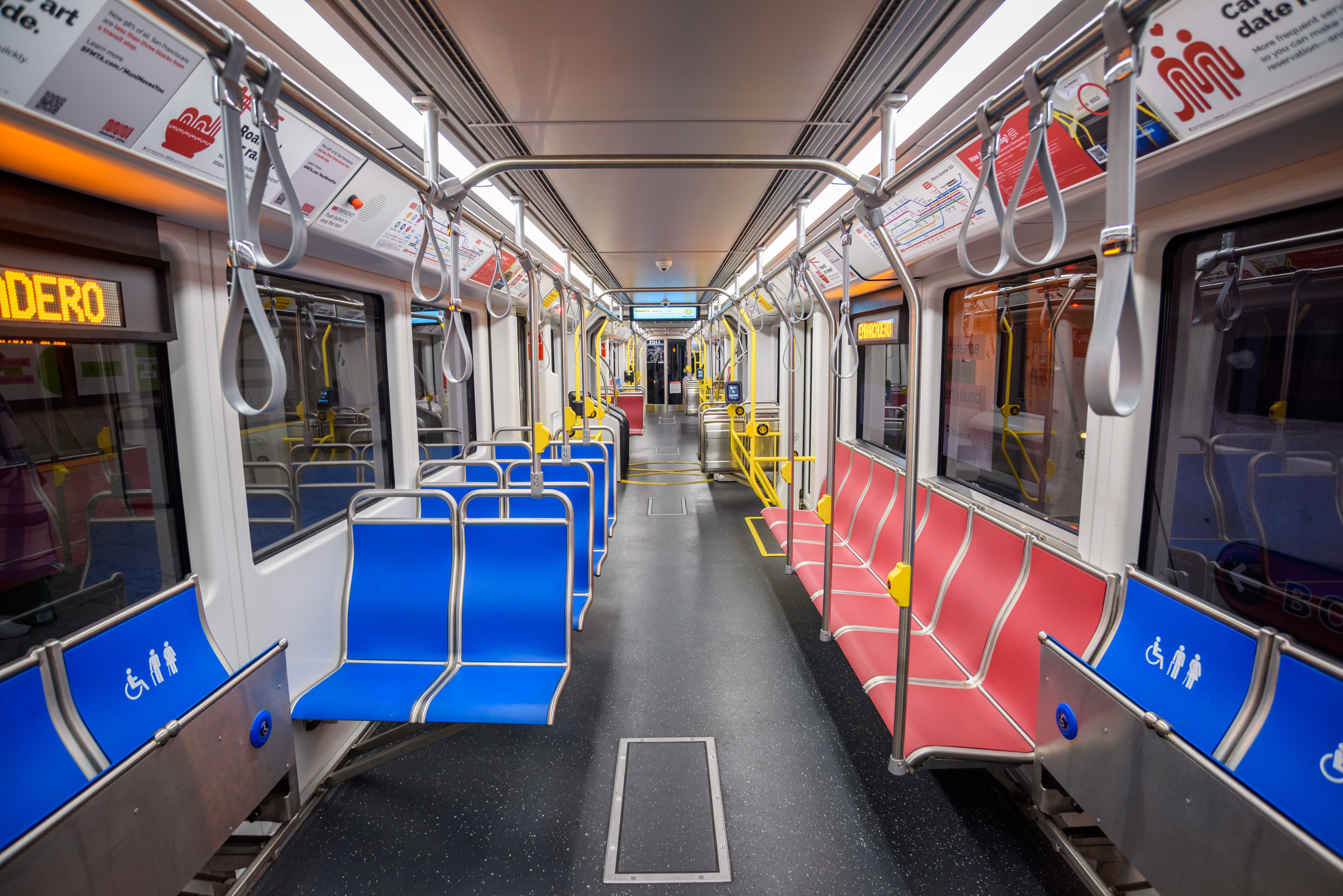
LRV4 interior, with a mixed seating arrangement

With the Breda cars growing increasingly unreliable and the system expanding with the construction of the Central Subway, Muni requested bids for a new generation of light rail vehicles. Muni prequalified CAF, Kawasaki and Siemens to bid on the request while Breda was disqualified based on a ranking of potential bidders.

The contract was awarded to Siemens for the purchase of up to 260 cars to be delivered in three phases: the initial firm order of 24 cars would accommodate the Central Subway; the next firm order of 151 cars would replace all of the Breda vehicles and an option to purchase up to 85 additional cars, funding permitting, to accommodate projected ridership growth through 2040. A grant of $41 million from the California Transportation Agency awarded on July 2, 2015, allowed Muni to purchase 40 additional Siemens light rail vehicles.

Upon awarding the contract, Muni officials cited several lessons learned from the prior Breda contract, including not buying enough cars, dictating too much of the design, lax reliability requirements and a failure to account for maintenance costs. The US$648,000,000 (equivalent to $881,276,356 in 2025) contract for 175 cars (the first two phases) was signed by Mayor Ed Lee in September 2014, making the cost of each car approximately US$3,700,000 (equivalent to $5,031,979 in 2025).

Muni ultimately purchased 249 vehicles: the 175 cars from the first two phases, 44 additional cars, and surplus 30 cars were contracted in 2021.

==== Design ====
Siemens has named the new Muni cars the S200 SF while the SFMTA refers to them as the LRV4. They operate at speeds of up to 50 miles per hour (80 km/h). The S200 SF is 75 feet (23 m) long, 8 feet 8.32 inches (2.65 m) wide, 11 feet 6 inches (3.51 m) high (with the pantograph locked down), and weighs 78,770 pounds (35,730 kg), making it comparable in size and weight to the existing Breda cars. The expected maximum capacity is 203 passengers per car. They are expected to have the same coupling device as the Breda cars; however, the new Siemens trains can couple up to five cars at a time. The new S200 SF vehicles are projected to be able to run 59,000 miles (95,000 km) between maintenance intervals. Initially, the new cars had a mean distance between failures (MDBF) of 3,300 miles (5,300 km) shortly after being delivered; by August 2019, the MDBF had improved to 8,000 miles (13,000 km).

==== Service history ====
Siemens publicly unveiled a full-size mockup of the S200 SF in San Francisco on June 16, 2015. The first car was delivered from the Siemens plant in Sacramento to San Francisco on January 13, 2017. A test car passed a CPUC regulatory inspection in early November 2017 and car #2006 was the first LRV to enter revenue service on November 17, 2017, following a ribbon-cutting ceremony at Duboce and Church.

The first 68 cars were used to expand the Muni fleet to 219 cars and once the fleet reached that total in October 2019, Breda cars would be retired as new Siemens cars are accepted.

It is expected that deliveries of cars will continue through 2028.

== Fares and operations ==
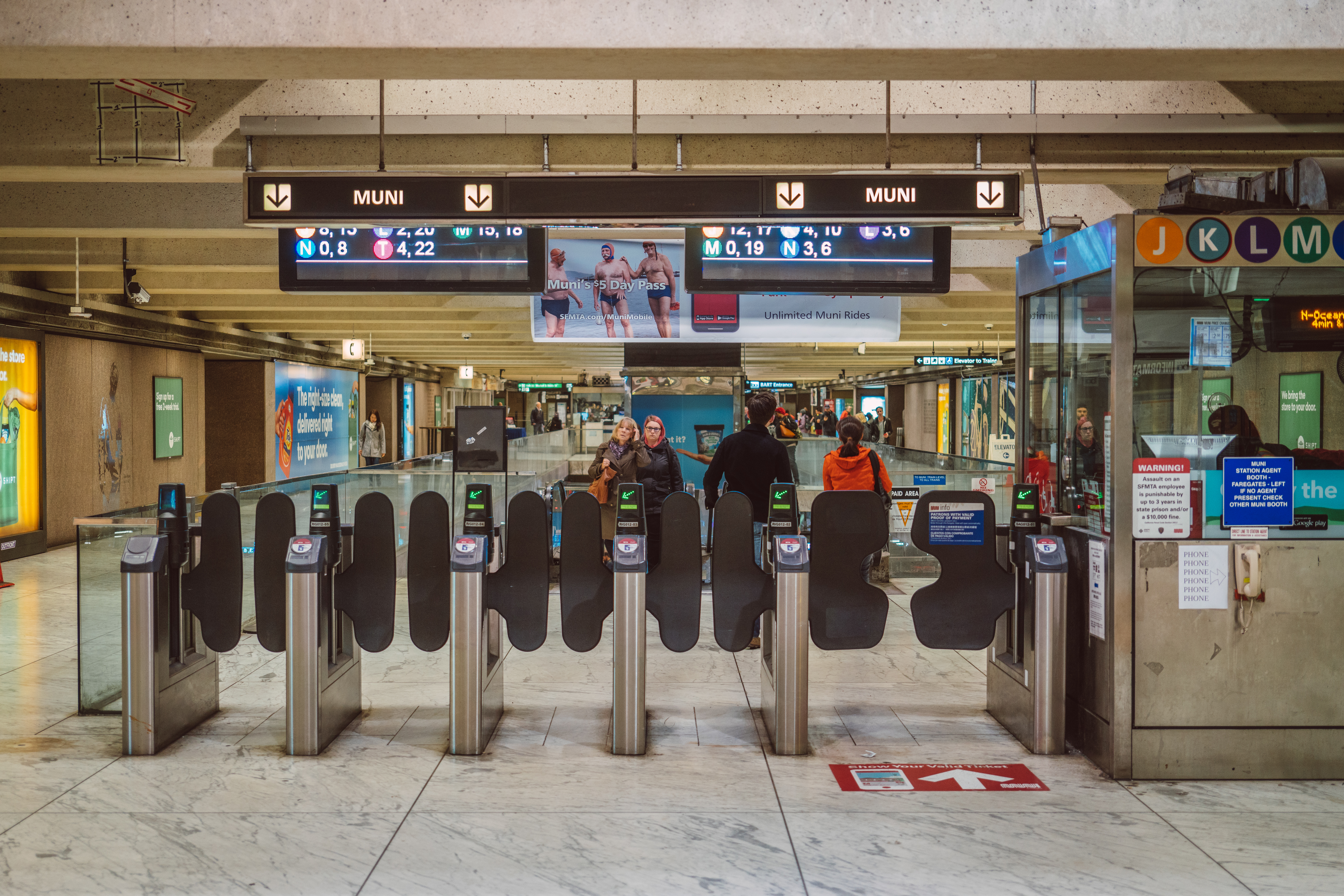
Muni Metro faregates at Embarcadero station

Muni Metro runs from approximately 5 am to 1 am weekdays, with later start times of 7 am on Saturday and 8 am on Sunday. Owl service, or late-night service, is provided along much of the L and N lines by buses that bear the same route designation.

The cash fare for Muni Metro, like Muni buses, effective January 1, 2020, is $3 for adults and $1.50 for seniors, and the disabled, and free for youths 5–19. Clipper and MuniMobile fares are lower than cash fares. Their fares are $2.85 for adults. For all people aged 19 and under, service is free.

Muni currently operates a Free Muni for Seniors program that provides low- and moderate-income seniors residing in San Francisco free access to all Muni transit services, including Muni's cable cars. Free Muni is open to all San Francisco senior Clipper card holders, ages 65 and over, with a gross annual family income at or below 100 percent of the Bay Area median income level (qualifying income levels are posted on the program's web page). Enrollment is not automatic. To participate in the program, a qualified senior must have or obtain a Clipper card and submit an application either online or by mail.

Like Muni buses, the Muni Metro operates on a proof-of-payment system; on paying a fare, the passenger will receive a ticket good for travel on any bus, historic streetcar, or Metro vehicle for 120 minutes. Payment methods depend on boarding location. On surface street sections in the south and west of the city, passengers must board at the front of the train and pay their fare to the train operator to receive their ticket; those who already have a ticket, or who have a daily, weekly, or monthly pass, can board at any door of the Metro streetcar. Subway stations have controlled entries via faregates, and passengers usually purchase or show Muni staff a ticket in order to enter the platform area. Faregates closest to an unmanned Muni staff booth open automatically if a passenger has a valid pass or transfer that cannot be scanned. Muni's fare inspectors may board trains at any time to check for proof of payment from passengers.

All cars are also equipped with Clipper card readers near each entrance, which riders may use to tag their cards to pay their fare. The cards themselves are then used as proof of payment; fare inspectors carry handheld card readers that can verify that payment was made. In subway stations, riders instead tag their cards on the faregates to gain access to the platforms.

== See also ==
- Market Street Railway and other rail lines operated by MUNI:
  - E Embarcadero line
  - F Market & Wharves line
  - San Francisco cable car system
- SelTrac, the automated train system used in the Market Street subway
- Light rail in the United States
- Streetcars in North America
- List of United States light rail systems by ridership
- List of North American light rail systems by ridership
- List of California railroads
- List of tram and light rail transit systems
