= Forest Hill station (Muni Metro) =

Railway station in San Francisco, California

Forest Hill
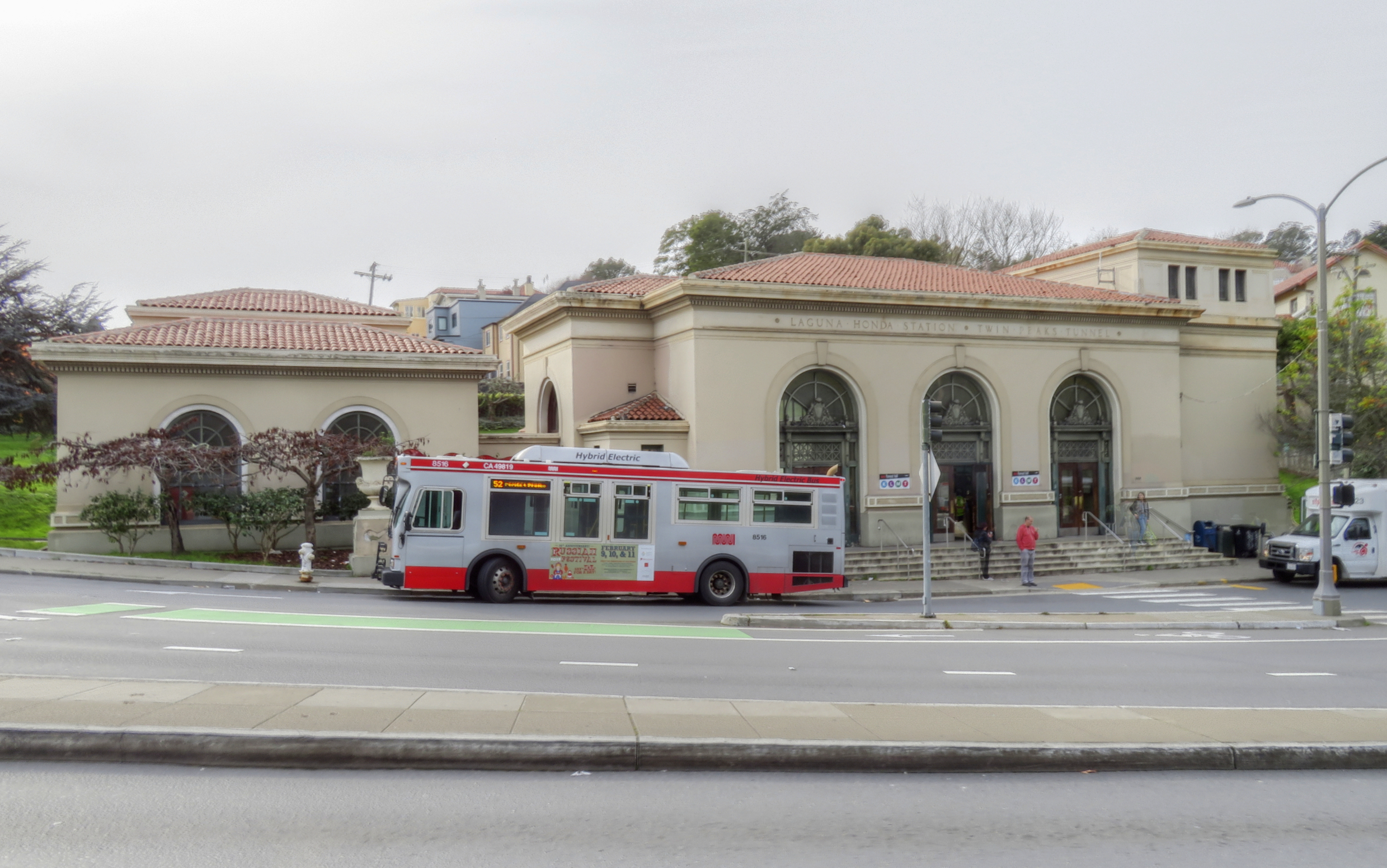
- Forest Hill station headhouse in 2018

General information
- Location: Laguna Honda Boulevard; San Francisco, California
- Coordinates: 37°44′53″N 122°27′33″W
- Owner: San Francisco Municipal Transportation Agency
- Line: Twin Peaks Tunnel
- Platforms: 2 side platforms
- Tracks: 2
- Connections: Muni: 36, 43, 44, 52

Construction
- Structure type: Underground
- Accessible: Yes

History
- Opened: February 3, 1918
- Rebuilt: 1985

Services
Preceding station	Muni	Following station
West Portal toward Balboa Park	K Ingleside	Castro toward Embarcadero
West Portal toward SF Zoo	L Taraval	Castro toward Embarcadero
West Portal toward San Jose and Geneva (Balboa Park)	M Ocean View	Castro toward Embarcadero
West Portal Terminus	S Shuttle	Castro toward Embarcadero

San Francisco Designated Landmark
- Designated: 2004
- Reference no.: 231
Location

Forest Hill station is a Muni Metro station located near the Forest Hill and Laguna Honda neighborhoods on the West Side of San Francisco, California. It was originally built in 1916 to 1918 as part of the Twin Peaks Tunnel, and is the oldest subway station west of Philadelphia and east of Istanbul. The station was originally named Laguna Honda; lettering with that former name is carved on the station headhouse.

Scenes from the film Dirty Harry (1971) and Milk (2008) were shot inside of this station.

== Station layout and architecture ==
An outbound L Taraval train at Forest Hill station in September 2026.

Forest Hill Station was built in a "restrained classical revival" style which has remained largely unaltered to the present. There are also a few decorative features suggestive of an Art Nouveau aesthetic, for example malachite colored accents placed over the elevator doors.

The station consists of two side platforms next to the tracks far below the surface. Forest Hill Station is located deeper underground than any other Muni Metro station; so much so that, unlike other stations, most people use an elevator to reach the platform at Forest Hill. A single elevator shaft began operation eighteen months following the opening of the station and a second was installed in 1928 (which was the largest elevator on the United States west coast at the time). Unlike all other underground Muni Metro stations, which feature an underground concourse mezzanine on the first level down, and the platform on the second level down, Forest Hill's concourse level is in a station building on the surface.

Forest Hill and Eureka Valley stations were originally constructed with low platforms, as streetcars of that era had steps to load passengers from street level. However, the six new Market Street subway stations, as well as West Portal station, were built with high-level platforms for speedier level boarding onto the new Boeing LRVs. With Eureka Valley permanently closed, Forest Hill was left as the only low-platform station on the Muni Metro subway. Muni later modified the station with high-level platforms, elevators for accessibility, and ventilation improvements. The $6 million project (equivalent to $18 million in 2025), which upgraded Forest Hill to equal the new stations while keeping its historic architecture, was completed in 1985.

== History ==
Laguna Honda opened with the Twin Peaks Tunnel on February 3, 1918.

The station was temporarily closed from June 25 to August 24, 2018, during the Twin Peaks Tunnel shutdown. It was closed again from March 19 to August 22, 2020, and from August 25, 2020, to May 15, 2021, during the COVID-19 pandemic.

== See also ==
- List of San Francisco Designated Landmarks
