= S Shuttle =

Light rail service in San Francisco, California

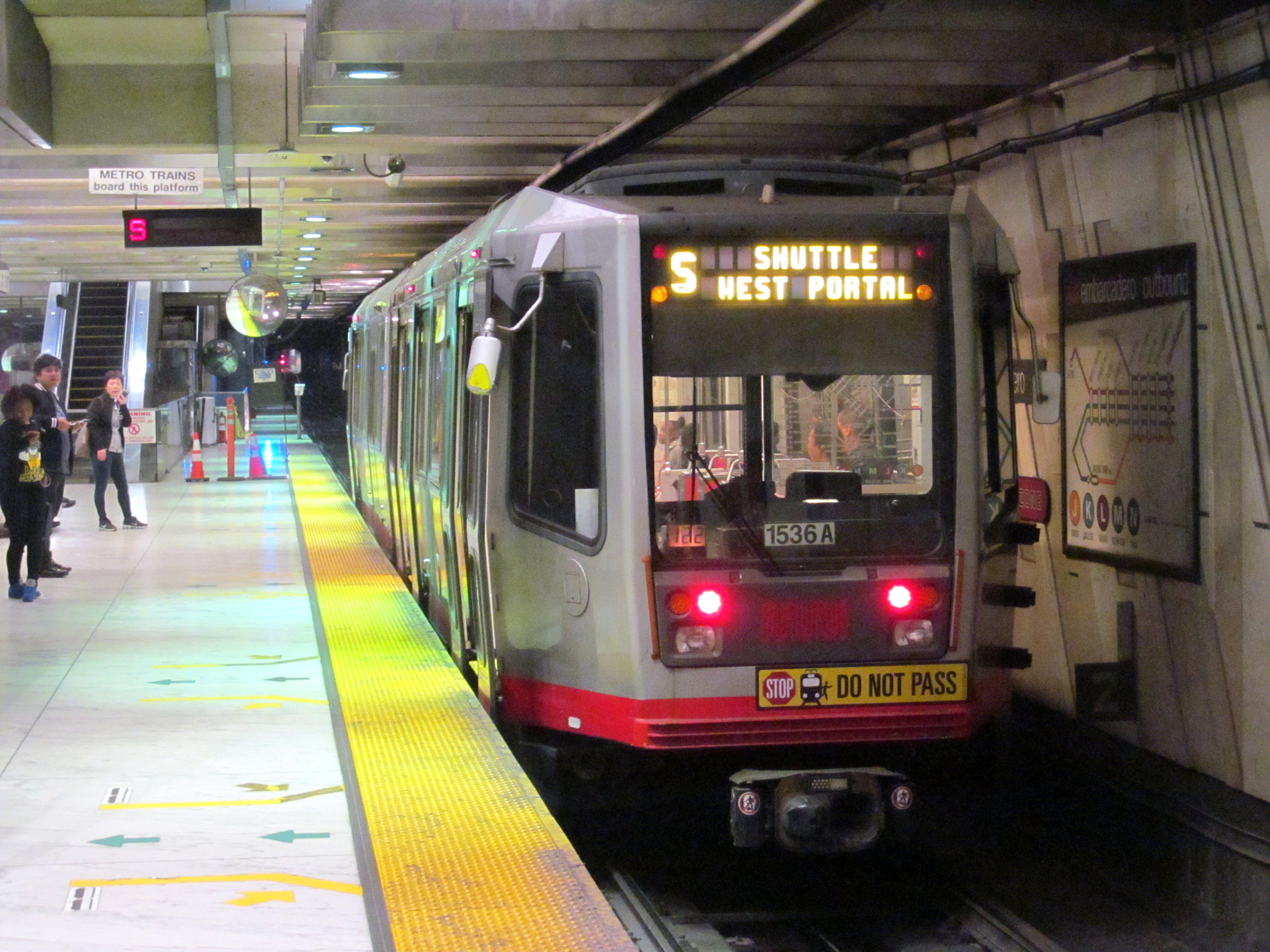
- An S Shuttle train at Embarcadero station in 2017

Overview
- Owner: San Francisco Municipal Transportation Agency
- Locale: San Francisco, California
- Termini: Embarcadero station; West Portal station
- Stations: 9

Service
- Type: Light rail
- System: Muni Metro
- Operator: San Francisco Municipal Railway
- Daily ridership: 2,700 (January 2024)

History
- Opened: April 2, 2001

Technical
- Track gauge: 4 ft 8 1/2 in (1,435 mm) standard gauge
- Electrification: Overhead line, 600 V DC
Route map
S Shuttle highlighted in yellow

The S Shuttle is a light rail service on the Muni Metro system in San Francisco, California. The service began in 2001 as the S Castro Shuttle, an effort to reduce crowding at Castro station. It was briefly discontinued in 2007 when the T Third Street line was opened. Service was extended to St. Francis Circle station in 2013, but cut back to West Portal station in 2016. From 2020 to 2024, the shuttle ran as a full-time service as part of a reconfiguration of Muni Metro service.

The designation of S Shuttle is also given to trains at other hours and locations, most commonly to those which run service before and after San Francisco Giants and Golden State Warriors games to provide additional capacity to Oracle Park and Chase Center respectively.

== History ==
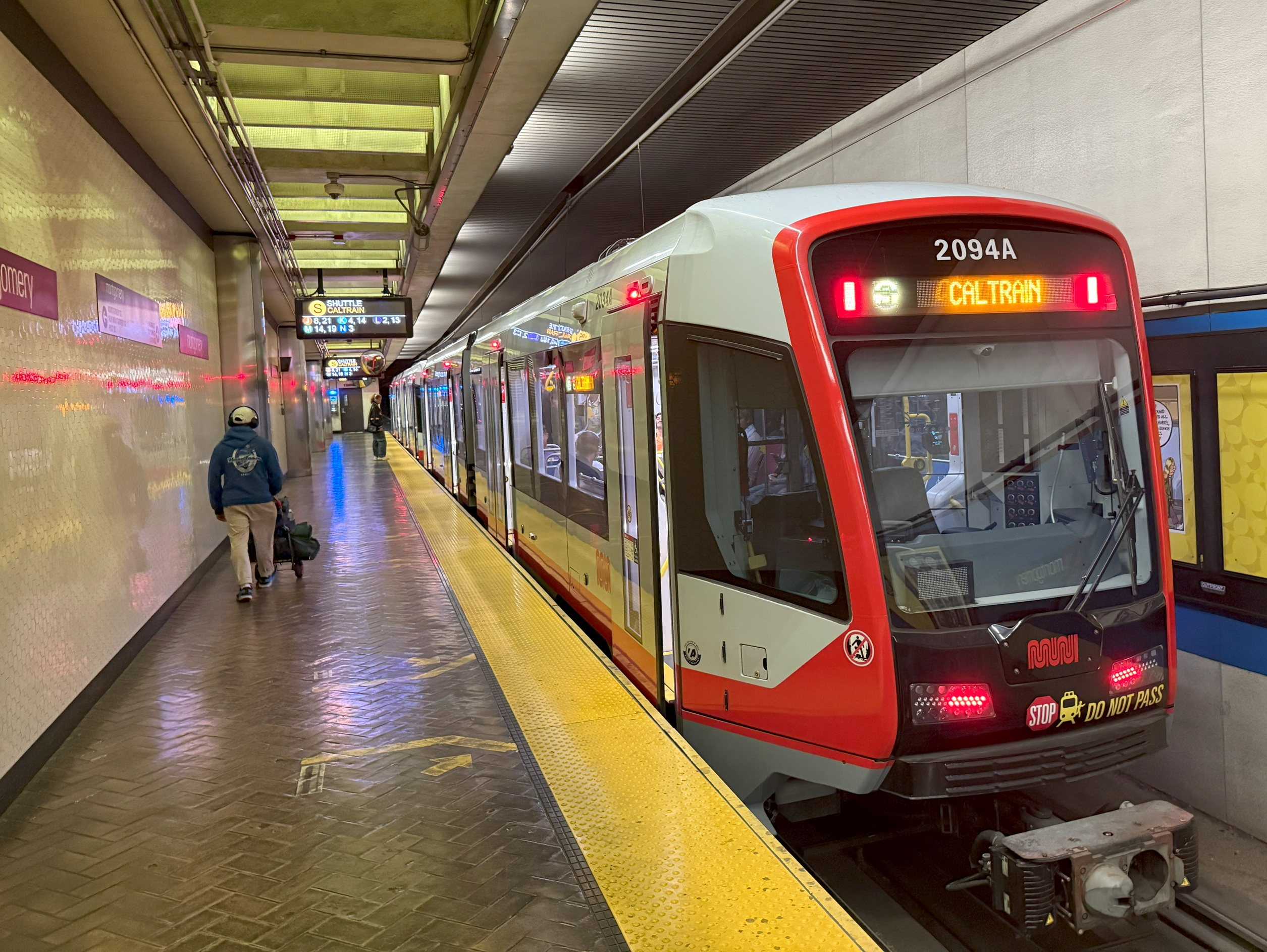
A game-day extra train running between West Portal and 4th & King (Caltrain) in 2025

After the installation of automatic train control in 1998, the maximum Muni Metro frequency through the Market Street subway doubled from 24 trains per hour to 48. Muni needed to increase capacity to accommodate growing ridership, but the aging Boeing LRV fleet and issues with the new Breda fleet left too few vehicles to run additional service on the branch lines. Instead, Muni introduced the S Castro Shuttle, which could relieve crowding at busy Castro station while using only a small amount of rolling stock. The service began on April 2, 2001, running only at rush hour on weekdays, with headways between 7 and 12 minutes.

A variety of service changes took place with the introduction of full service on the T Third Street line on April 7, 2007. The new line was routed through the subway to Castro station, replacing the S Castro Shuttle; changes were also made to the J Church, N Judah, and several bus lines. (The S Castro Shuttle designation continued to be used for extra service to AT&T Park on San Francisco Giants game days.) The changes were unpopular with the public; the Muni Metro changes caused severe delays in the Market Street subway, and forced many riders to transfer to reach the Caltrain station when they previously did not. On June 30, 2007, Muni reversed several of the changes. The J, N, and S were restored to their previous routes, while the T was interlined with the K Ingleside line. The revived shuttle ran on 10-minute headways using three trains.

On October 4, 2013, Muni began a pilot of S Shuttle service, which included the first three-car train on Muni Metro since the 1990s. The three-car train and a two-car train ran between Embarcadero and St. Francis Circle station with only six morning round trips and one evening round trip; the last morning trips ran through to 23rd Street on their way to the Muni Metro East facility. However, the three-car set proved unreliable, and perennial rolling stock shortages caused the shuttles to be frequently cancelled in favor of branch line service.

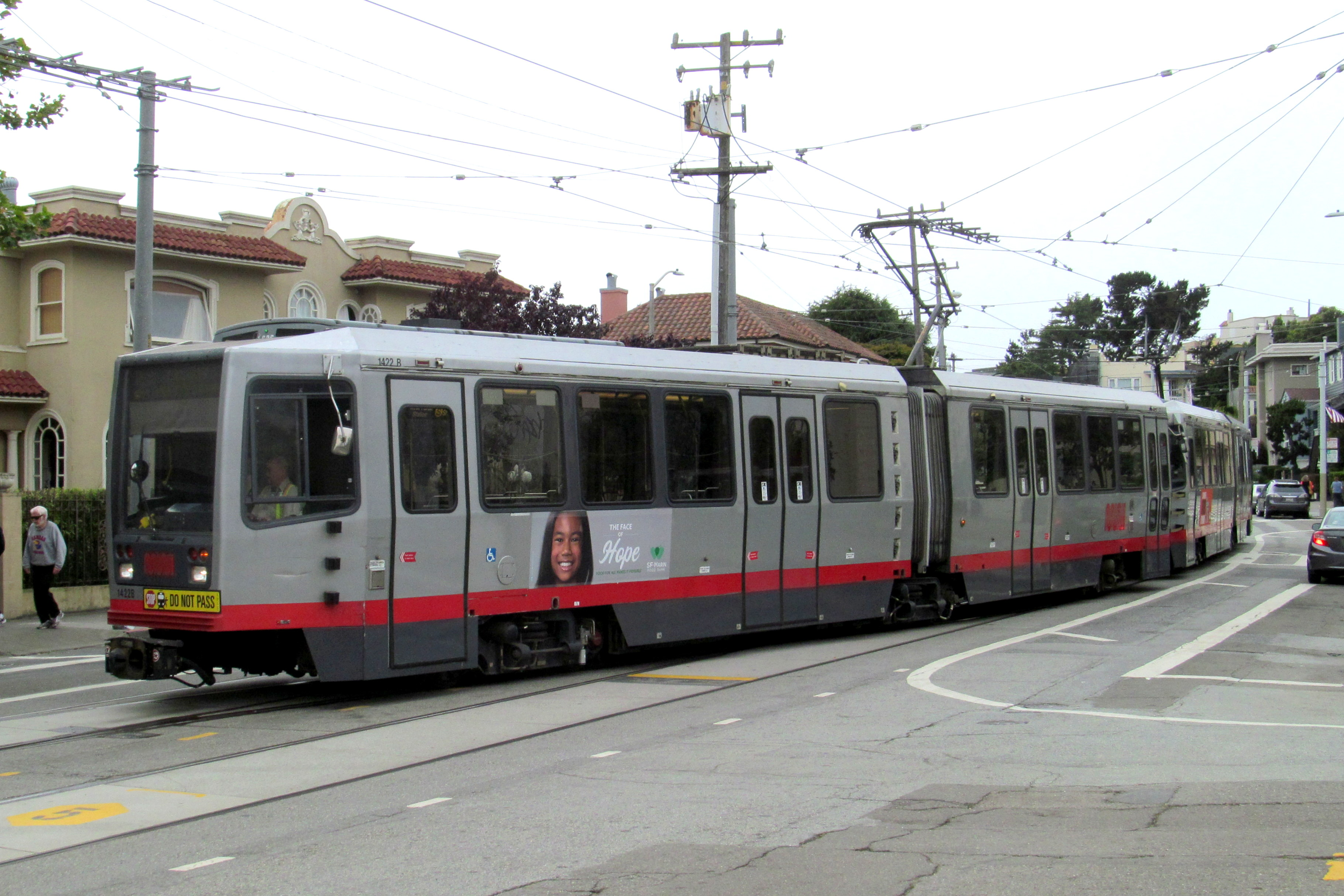
An S Shuttle train crossing over near West Portal station in 2017

On November 7, 2016, Muni changed the service to a pair of single-car trains running between West Portal station and Embarcadero. The revamped service, which was modeled after similar Hillway shuttles on the N Judah line, ran during weekday morning rush hours. Although it nominally switched back at West Portal, service often instead used a more reliable crossover at Taraval and 19th Avenue station. By 2019, the SFMTA described the S Shuttle as an irregular route meant to supplement other Muni services.

On March 30, 2020, Muni Metro service was replaced with buses due to the COVID-19 pandemic. Rail service returned on August 22, with the routes reconfigured to improve reliability in the subway. S Shuttle service frequency was increased, as three other lines no longer entered the subway; two- and three-car trains operated between West Portal and Embarcadero on 6–9 minute headways. Rail service was re-replaced with buses on August 25 due to issues with malfunctioning overhead wire splices and the need to quarantine control center staff after a COVID-19 case. K/T and N subway service resumed on May 15, 2021, along with supplemental S Shuttle service. Full-time S shuttle service was replaced by full-time L service on September 28, 2024.

Since T Third Street service moved to the Central Subway in January 2023, shuttle trains signed "S Chase Center" operate between Chinatown and UCSF/Chase Center for events at Chase Center.

== Station listing ==
Station	Neighborhood	Other Muni Metro lines	Notes and connections
Embarcadero	Financial District	J Church K Ingleside L Taraval M Ocean View N Judah	BART: F Market & Wharves; California; SF Ferry Terminal; Muni: 1, 2, 6, 7X, 9, 9R, 12, 14, 14R, 14X, 21, 30X, 31, 41, 81X, 82X; Golden Gate Transit, Presidio Go Shuttle, SamTrans
Montgomery	Financial District	J Church K Ingleside L Taraval M Ocean View N Judah	BART: F Market & Wharves; Muni: 2, 3, 5, 5R, 6, 7, 7X, 8, 8AX, 8BX, 9, 9R, 10, 15, 21, 30, 31, 45, 76X, 81X, Geary BRT (38, 38R); AC Transit, Golden Gate Transit, SamTrans
Powell	Financial District	(at Union Sq/Market St)	BART: F Market & Wharves; Powell–Hyde, Powell–Mason; Muni: 5, 5R, 6, 7, 7X, 8, 8AX, 8BX, 9, 9R, 15, 21, 27, 30, 31, 45, 81X; AC Transit, SamTrans
Civic Center	Civic Center	J Church K Ingleside L Taraval M Ocean View N Judah	BART: F Market & Wharves; Muni: 5, 5R, 6, 7, 9, 9R, 19, 21, 83X; AC Transit, Golden Gate Transit, SamTrans
Van Ness	Civic Center, Tenderloin	J Church K Ingleside L Taraval M Ocean View N Judah	F Market & Wharves; Muni: 6, 7, 9, 9R, Van Ness BRT (47, 49, 79X); AC Transit, SamTrans
Church	Duboce Triangle	(Surface stop)	F Market & Wharves; Muni: 22, 37
Castro	Castro	K Ingleside L Taraval M Ocean View	F Market & Wharves; Muni: 24, 35, 37
Forest Hill	Forest Hill, Laguna Honda	K Ingleside L Taraval M Ocean View	Muni: 36, 43, 44, 52
West Portal	West Portal	K Ingleside L Taraval M Ocean View	Muni: 48, 57
