= Eureka Valley station =

Abandoned streetcar station in San Francisco, California

Eureka Valley
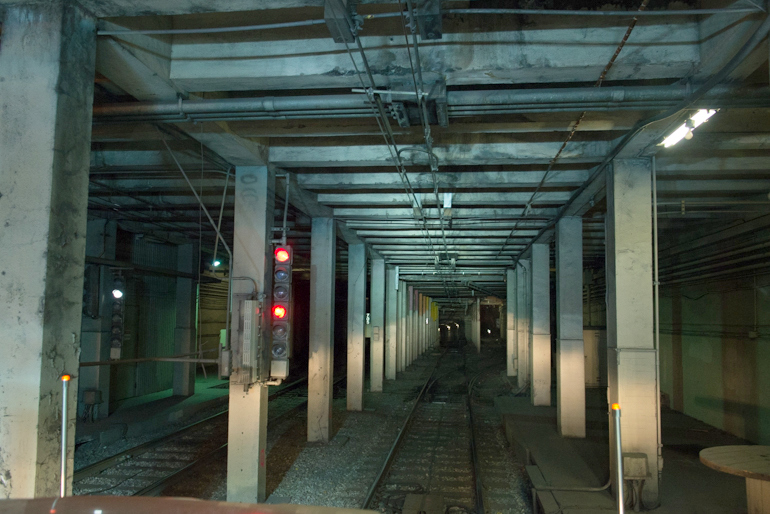
- Remains of the inbound side of the station in 2015

General information
- Location: Market Street between Eureka and Diamond streets San Francisco, California
- Coordinates: 37°45′42.3″N 122°26′17.6″W
- Owner: San Francisco Municipal Railway
- Line: Twin Peaks Tunnel
- Platforms: 2 side platforms
- Tracks: 2

History
- Opened: February 3, 1918
- Closed: 1972

Final services at closure
Preceding station	Muni	Following station
Forest Hill toward Phelan Loop	K Ingleside	17th Street and Castro toward East Bay Terminal
Forest Hill toward SF Zoo	L Taraval	17th Street and Castro toward East Bay Terminal
Forest Hill toward Broad and Plymouth	M Ocean View	17th Street and Castro toward East Bay Terminal
Location

Eureka Valley station is an abandoned underground streetcar station in San Francisco, California. It was located inside the Twin Peaks Tunnel, very close to its eastern end in the Eureka Valley neighborhood. The station opened in 1918, and was closed in 1972 during the construction of the Market Street subway.

== History ==
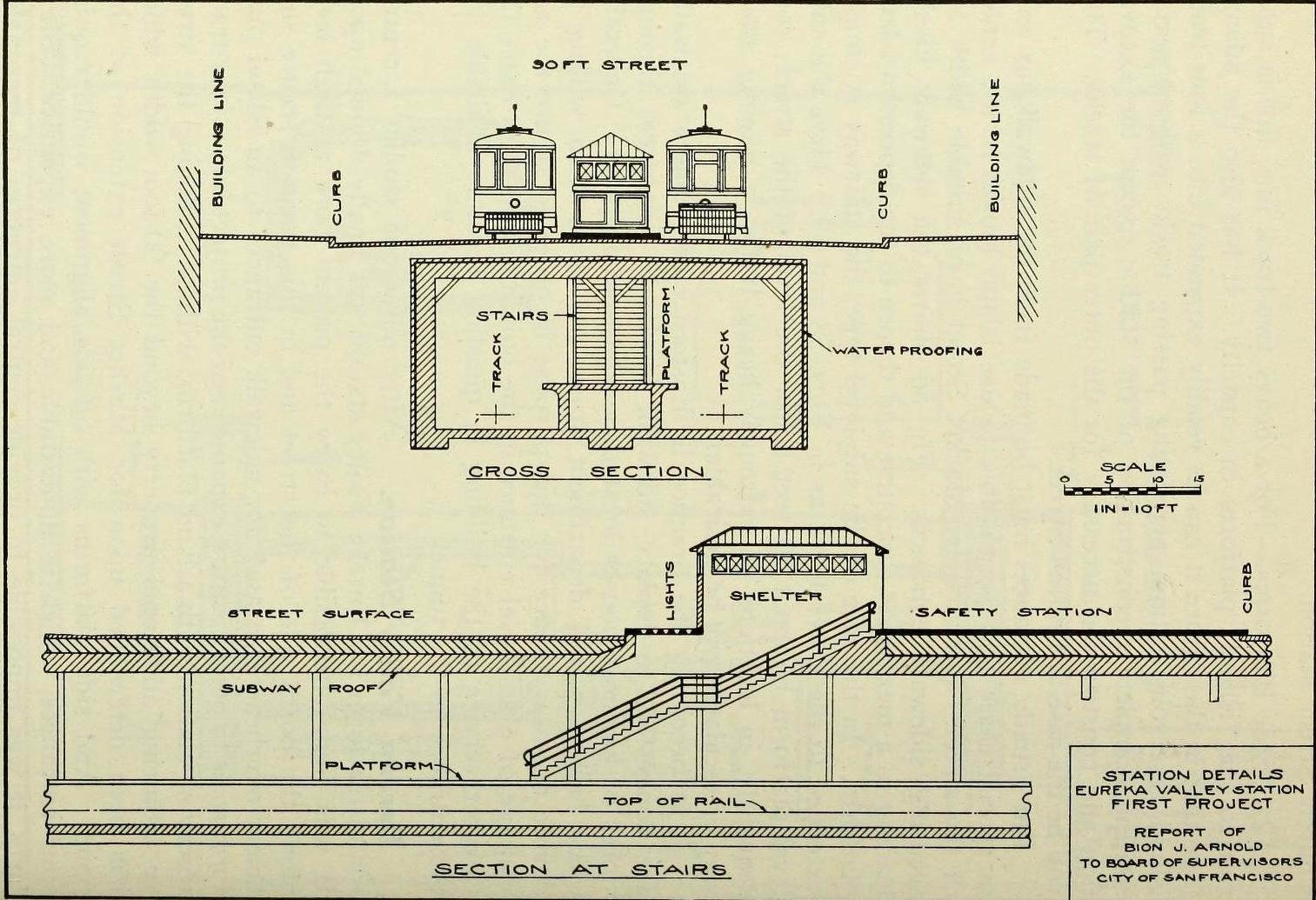
Arnold's 1913 proposal for the Eureka Valley station included an underground island platform.

During early planning of the municipal transit system, Eureka Valley station was positioned to serve as a transfer station to the Sunset Tunnel, whose east portal was originally to be located at the corner of Market and Eureka streets. The station had low platforms, with a single staircase on each platform leading to a small headhouse on each side of Market Street. It opened with the Twin Peaks Tunnel on February 3, 1918; the Sunset Tunnel was built a decade later with an east portal at Duboce and Noe instead. Just east of the station, the tunnel dipped sharply (to connect to a planned Market Street subway) then rose to the surface at Castro Street.

When the Market Street subway was under construction, Forest Hill station was retained and years later upgraded to Muni Metro standards with high platforms, but Eureka Valley station was not. Plagued by high crime due to its low ridership and bent staircases, it was "a place as dangerous as any in the city." The station was permanently closed in 1972, and "temporary" ramps to the surface were built through the east ends of the platforms, allowing construction of the new subway while maintaining existing streetcar service (on 17th Street, Church, and Duboce).

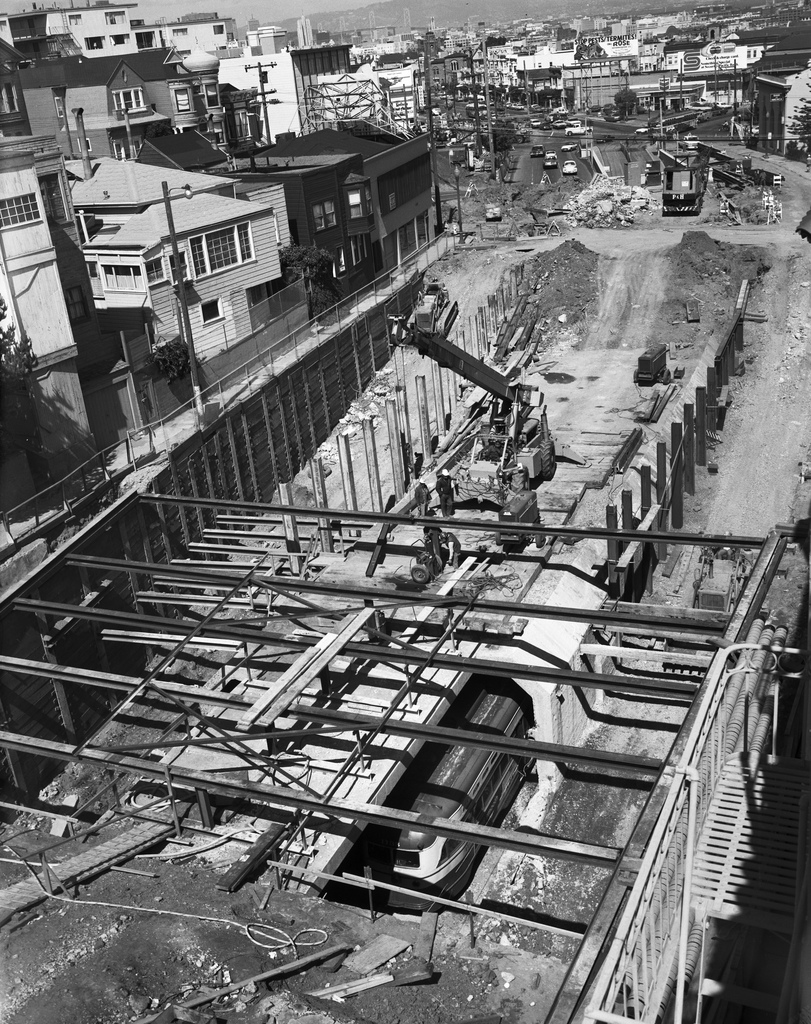
Streetcars run through the closed station in 1973 while the temporary ramps are constructed around it.

Cars on the K, L, and M lines began using temporary trackage on 17th Street on December 2, 1972, though the ramps were not completed until 1973. After eight years of construction, Castro station opened slightly to the east in 1980 when Muni Metro service was inaugurated on the three Twin Peaks Tunnel lines. The ramps remained in revenue service on weekends until September 19, 1982, when the last PCC streetcar service was discontinued. The ramps were regularly used by streetcars in the Historic Trolley Festival, providing access to a yard near Balboa Park station, until the extension of the J Church line to Balboa Park Station was completed in 1991.

After its closure, Eureka Valley station continued to attract illicit activity like parties and sex; Muni removed the decrepit headhouses in February 1980, and the station was more tightly secured with fences and doors. The now–fenced-off ramps are not regularly used by trains but are still present in Muni's internal train control system.

The remaining platforms are the Bay Area's only ghost station and can be seen from passing trains. The stairwells remain in place, leading to emergency exits in the sidewalks outside. Planned renovations of the Twin Peaks Tunnel include seismic retrofitting of the former station.
