= Twin Peaks Tunnel =

Light rail tunnel in San Francisco, California

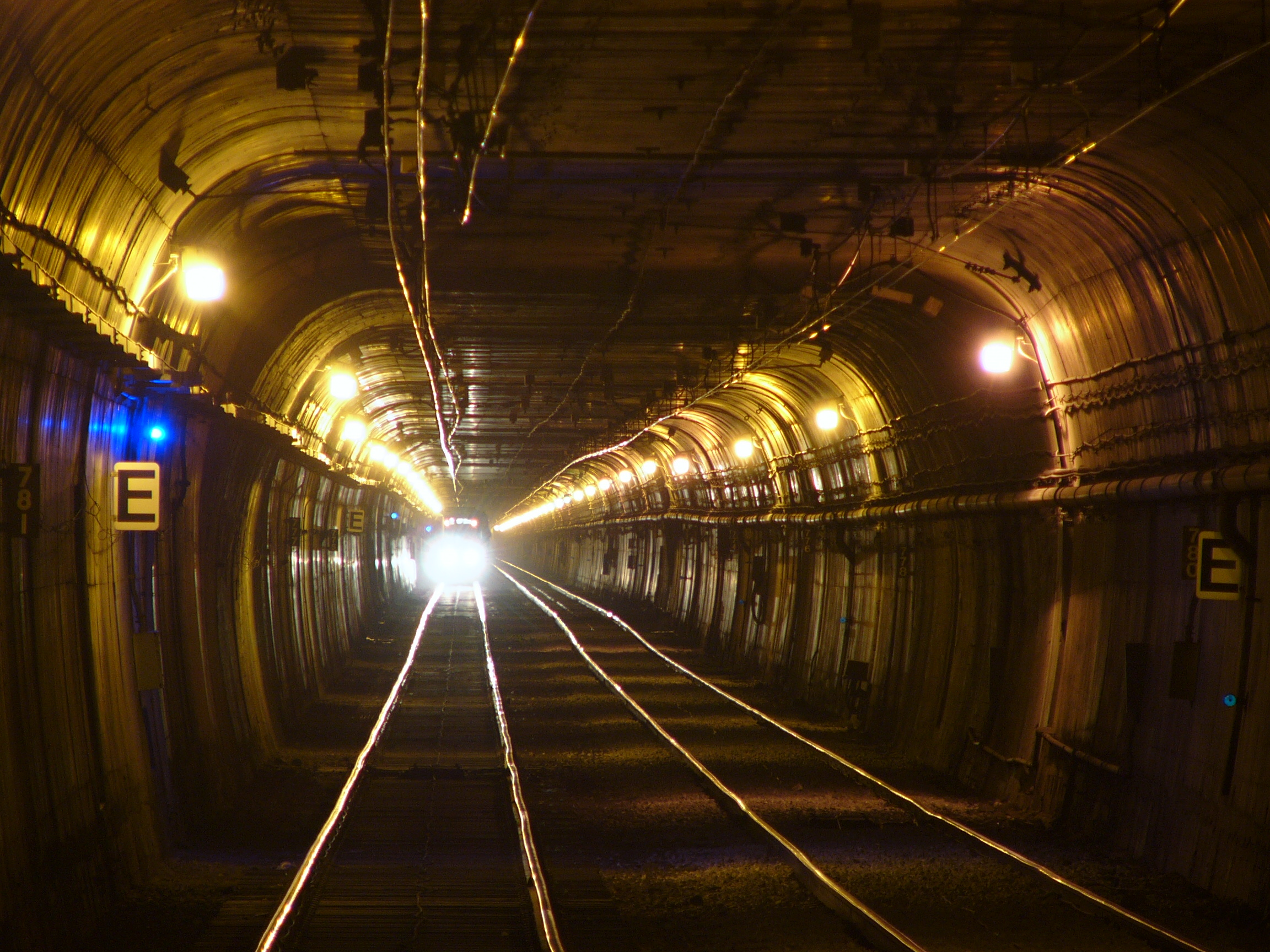
- Twin Peaks Tunnel at Forest Hill station

Overview
- Location: San Francisco, California
- Coordinates: East portal: 37°45′43″N 122°26′13″W; West portal: 37°44′29″N 122°27′56″W
- System: Muni Metro
- Crosses: Twin Peaks and surrounding neighborhoods
- Start: Market Street subway
- End: West Portal Station
- No. of stations: 3 (2 open, 1 closed)

Operation
- Opened: February 3, 1918; 108 years ago
- Rebuilt: June 25 – August 24, 2018
- Owner: San Francisco Municipal Transportation Agency
- Operator: San Francisco Municipal Railway
- Character: Underground subway tunnel for light rail/streetcar system

Technical
- Length: 11,675 ft (3,559 m)
- Line length: 2.27 mi (3.65 km)
- No. of tracks: 2
- Track gauge: 4 ft 8 1/2 in (1,435 mm) standard gauge
- Electrified: Overhead line, 600 V DC
- Tunnel clearance: 25 ft (7.6 m)

Route map
Twin Peaks Tunnel highlighted in red

The Twin Peaks Tunnel is a 2.27-mile-long (3.65 km) light rail/streetcar tunnel in San Francisco, California. The tunnel runs under Twin Peaks and is used by the K Ingleside, L Taraval, M Ocean View and S Shuttle lines of the Muni Metro system.

The eastern entrance to the tunnel is located at the west end of the Market Street subway, near the intersection of Market and Castro Streets, in the Castro neighborhood, and the western entrance is located at West Portal Avenue and Ulloa Street, in the West Portal neighborhood, named for the tunnel. There are three stations along the tunnel: West Portal at the western entrance, Forest Hill near the middle, and the now disused Eureka Valley near the eastern end.

== History ==
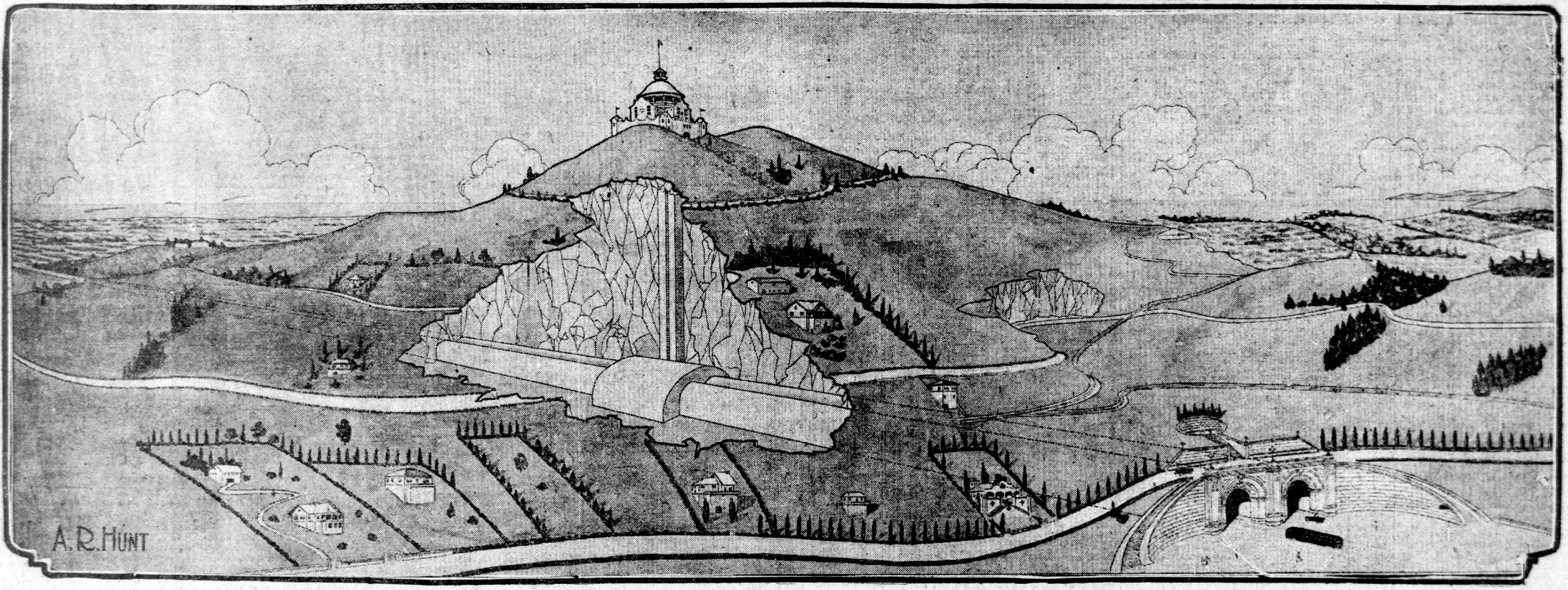
August 1910 conceptual cutaway rendering of tunnel

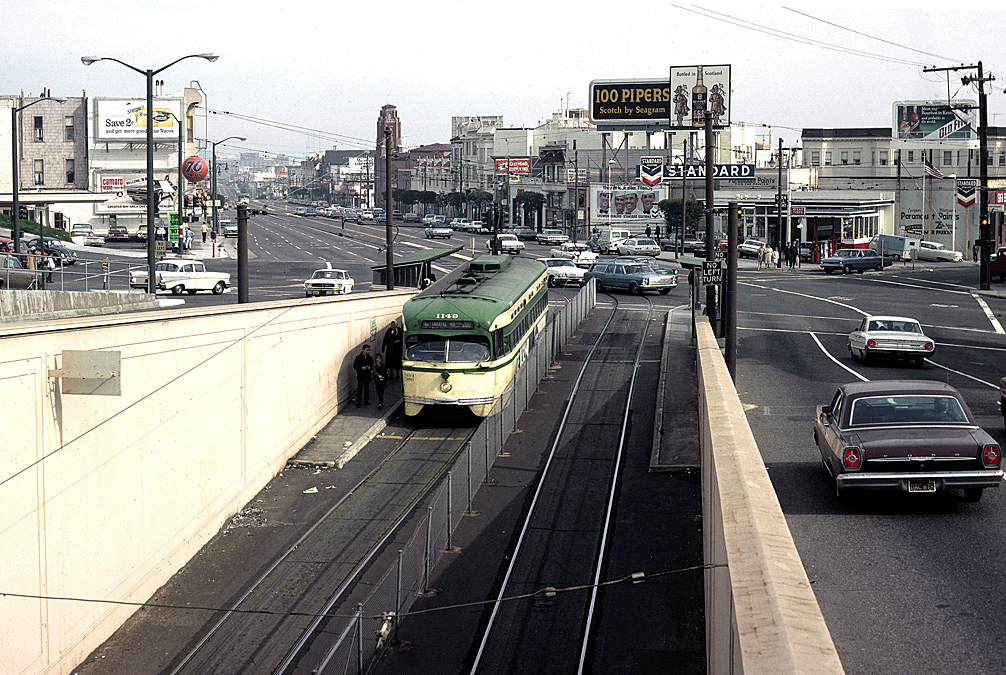
The (now replaced) east portal of the Twin Peaks Tunnel in February 1967

Plans for a tunnel extending from Market Street under Twin Peaks were first presented at the Merchants' Association banquet in May 1909. A. W. Scott Jr. spoke on the need for the tunnel to open up the western part of San Francisco to development, as "40,000 San Franciscans lived across the bay or in San Mateo county because of the lack of proper transportation in this city." In April 1910, a committee, named the Twin Peaks Convention, was formed to plan the project, which would open the development of approximately one quarter of San Francisco's land area.

=== Competing proposals ===
In July 1910, an architectural rendering was released of the eastern portal; the tunnel was initially envisioned as a two-story bore 1.5 miles (2.4 km) long, carrying road traffic on the upper deck and rail traffic on the lower deck. Market Street would be extended southwest in a straight line across private property to connect to the eastern portal, to be located at the intersection of 19th and Douglass. Initial estimates for the cost of the tunnel ranged from US$1,500,000 (equivalent to $54,000,000 in 2025) in 1909 to US$3,000,000 (equivalent to $104,000,000 in 2025) in 1910.

The Twin Peaks Tunnel and Improvement Convention released their report in August 1910 recommending a municipal bond to pay for the tunnel, whose costs would be recouped by the additional taxation of the land that would then be opened for development. Other options were considered and rejected, including a special assessment district or a long-term railroad lease.

The San Francisco Board of Supervisors approved a competing plan to build a longer tunnel under Twin Peaks in March 1912, continuing under Market to Valencia, which was seen as the foundation for a rapid transit system connecting the downtown Financial District with western San Francisco and the Peninsula. This action was taken on the recommendation of noted tunnel expert Bion J. Arnold, who had submitted two preliminary reports in 1912 and followed up with a final report in March 1913. The 1913 report studied several alternative alignments and configurations, recommending construction of both the Twin Peaks Tunnel and what would become the Sunset Tunnel.

Twin Peaks Tunnel proposal summary
	No. 1	No. 2	No. 3		No. 4		No. 5		
	No. 1	No. 2	3	3A	4	4A	5	5A	5B
Notes	AKA Schussler plan	Proposed by Twin Peaks Tunnel Association	High-level tunnel		Includes transfer station near present-day Forest Hill station		Combines aspects of Nos. 2 and 4, including transfer station at Forest Hill		
East Portal	Market & Castro	Market & Valencia	Market & Castro	19th & Douglass	Market & Castro	18th & Eureka	Market & Valencia	19th & Douglass	18th & Eureka
Route	W on 17th to Stanyan; SSW between hills to Dewey	Straight between portals							
West Portal	Dewey Blvd	Corbett & Dewey	Laguna Honda near S end of Alms House tract		Taraval & Dewey (near present-day West Portal station)				

In the 1913 report, Arnold primarily considered proposals No. 2 and No. 5B, concluding "I can recommend unqualifiedly [sic] the construction of a Twin Peaks Rapid Transit tunnel at the earliest possible date. In so doing, there will be brought within 30 minutes' running time of the business district, approximately 10,000 acres of new territory, 75% of which is suitable for residence land, that has been practically useless heretofore by reason of lack of adequate transportation thereto." One of the key elements of proposal No. 5B was the creation of a new station along the tunnel, which is now present-day Forest Hill station (then called Laguna Honda station, at the intersection of Laguna Honda and Dewey Boulevard). The San Francisco Call speculated the presence of a station at Laguna Honda meant the Geary line could be extended through Golden Gate Park. A 1912 report, by Arnold, proposed that Laguna Honda would be a transfer point, enabling passengers to move from Third and Market to Ocean Beach within 25 minutes on an express car, assuming a Seventh Avenue surface line was built.

Twin Peaks Tunnel locations
1 East Portal
2 Proposed East Portal (1910, T.P. Tunnel Assoc.)
3 Proposed East Portal (1913, Arnold)
4 West Portal station
5 Forest Hill station
6 Eureka Valley station (closed 1972)

At a proposed 16,000 feet (4,900 m) in length, Arnold's proposed tunnel would not be suitable for road traffic for lack of adequate ventilation. He also believed the straight extension of Market to 19th and Douglass was impractical, as it would require extensive earth moving and exceed 3% maximum grade. It was on this basis that the Twin Peaks Association of Improvement in 1912 voiced their opposition to Arnold's plans. In February 1913 City Engineer M.M. O'Shaughnessy recommended terminating the tunnel at 17th and Market, as he thought the Market Street subway may need to be extended past Valencia, potentially to Third. O'Shaughnessy's report, endorsing Arnold's plan, was unanimously adopted by the Board of Supervisors in October 1913. With the addition of 15,000 acres (6,100 ha) of "the best residence property on the peninsula within 15 minutes of the business center of the city", the Call estimated the population of San Francisco would add 100,000 within three years and 200,000 within five.

Carl Larsen, a prominent resident of the rural western side of San Francisco, recommended shortening the tunnel proposed by Arnold by moving the western portal to Laguna Honda station, but O'Shaughnessy stated the resulting grade would be too steep. Mayor James Rolph signed the Twin Peaks Tunnel Act in November 1913, rejecting the proposal for a shorter tunnel.

=== Construction and opening ===
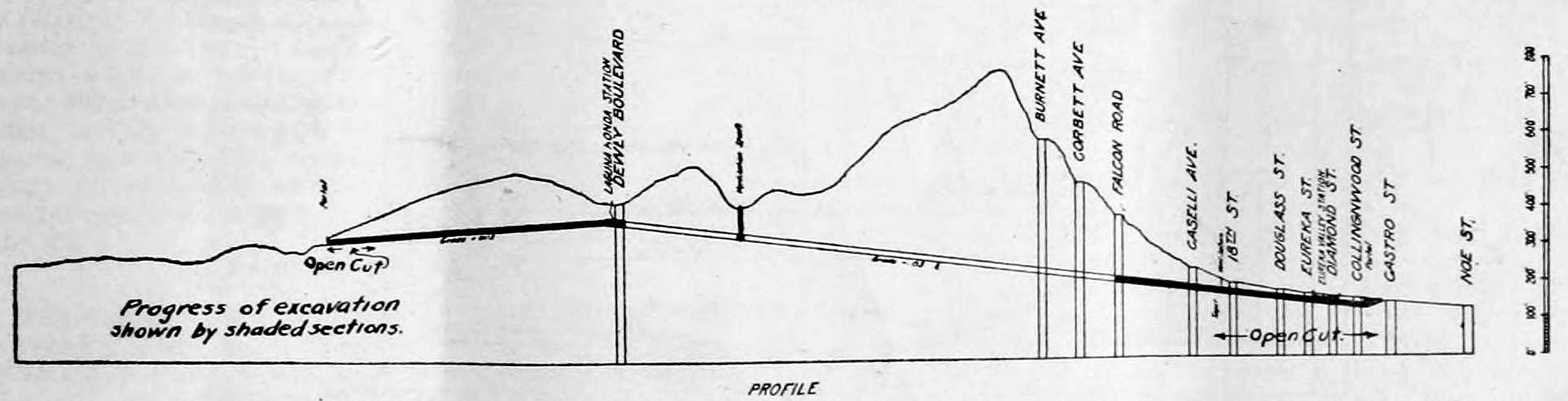
Profile of Twin Peaks Tunnel, showing excavation progress as of 1916

The contract for tunnel construction was awarded on November 2, 1914, to the R.C. Storrie Company, for US$3,372,000 (equivalent to $108,390,000 in 2025), and work began on the Twin Peaks Tunnel in December 1914, with an estimated three-year construction schedule for the twin-track bore. Construction was completed thirty-three months later. Funding for the tunnel came from special assessment districts established at the eastern and western ends; the undeveloped western area, approximately 4,000 acres (1,600 ha), was responsible for 85% of tunnel costs.

"Double Tube Flat Top"

"Soft Ground"

Profile sections of Twin Peaks Tunnel. Most of the structure uses the "Soft Ground" arched profile, with the exception of the eastern end of the tunnel, which uses the "Double Tube Flat Top" section.

The eastern approach to the tunnel was built along a parcel purchased by the city approximately 1,800 feet (550 m) long and 90 feet (27 m) wide at the end of Market. This right-of-way was also later paved to connect Market with Portola. As originally constructed, the total length of the tunnel is 11,675 feet (3,559 m) (including approaches) and the highest point of the tunnel is near Forest Hill, originally Laguna Honda, station. Sloping down from the peak at Forest Hill, from west to east the tunnel has a maximum ascending grade of 1.15% and maximum descending of 3%. Excluding approaches, the tunnel is 8,800 feet (2,700 m) long.

The eastern 1,665-foot (507 m) portion (with the exception of the 300-foot (91 m) long Eureka Valley station) of the tunnel uses a double-tube subway structure, and the remainder adopts an arched tube profile. As designed, both sections provide 15 feet (4.6 m) of vertical clearance above the top of the rail; each tube in the double-tube section is 14 feet (4.3 m) wide, and the arched tube is 25 feet (7.6 m) wide at its maximum. The lunette space between the arched roof and flat ceiling of the tube was used as a duct to convey fresh air into the tunnel. One blower was mounted at the west end of the double-tube structure, and the other was at a ventilating shaft 110 feet (34 m) deep, located 4,600 feet (1,400 m) east of the western portal. Excavation of the ventilating shaft required pumping 300,000 US gallons (1,100 kl) of water per day after a horizontal drift at the bottom of the shaft struck water-bearing sand.

Laguna Honda, West Portal, and Eureka Valley stations were constructed using cut-and-cover methods. Laguna Honda station is approximately 70 feet (20 m) below grade. The tunnel was excavated simultaneously from the open cuts at each end; initial excavation sank three drifts (one at each side along the springline, and one at the crown of the tunnel). A fourth drift was added at the centerline bottom of the tunnel to facilitate drainage of the ground at the western end. The two crews first "holed through" and connected their excavations near Laguna Honda station on April 5, 1917, 6,100 feet (1,900 m) from the east portal and 5,900 feet (1,800 m) from the west.

Several notable accidents occurred during the construction of the tunnel:

- A cave-in at the west portal trapped several men in April 1915, killing one.
- A fire broke out in November 1915.
- Four were killed and several injured while investigating a blasting charge that did not go off when planned in February 1917.
- A woman's house was nearly blown off its foundation by a blasting charge.

Politicians and dignitaries stand outside rail car #117 following the first revenue trip through the tunnel, February 3, 1918. Mayor James Rolph stands inside the rail car at the open window. Supervisor Richard J. Welch stands outside, directly under the "enter at rear" sign.

Dedication ceremonies were held at each portal on July 14, 1917. Mayor Rolph and several other dignitaries, including former Mayor P. H. McCarthy spoke at the east portal, beginning at 2:00 p.m.; after the remarks, hundreds of people walked through the tunnel to the west portal, and Judge E. P. Shortall was the first of the pedestrians to arrive. At the west portal, Mayor Rolph spoke again and a ceremonial silver spike was driven by O'Shaughnessy and Rolph to mark the start of construction of the Twin Peaks Railway. The inaugural trip through the tunnel occurred on December 31, 1917. The tunnel was opened to revenue service on February 3, 1918, and was the world's longest tunnel for street railway traffic at the time. Mayor Rolph served as the motorman for the first revenue trip, and most of the paying passengers were City Supervisors, wives, and invited guests. The trip through the tunnel took seven minutes.

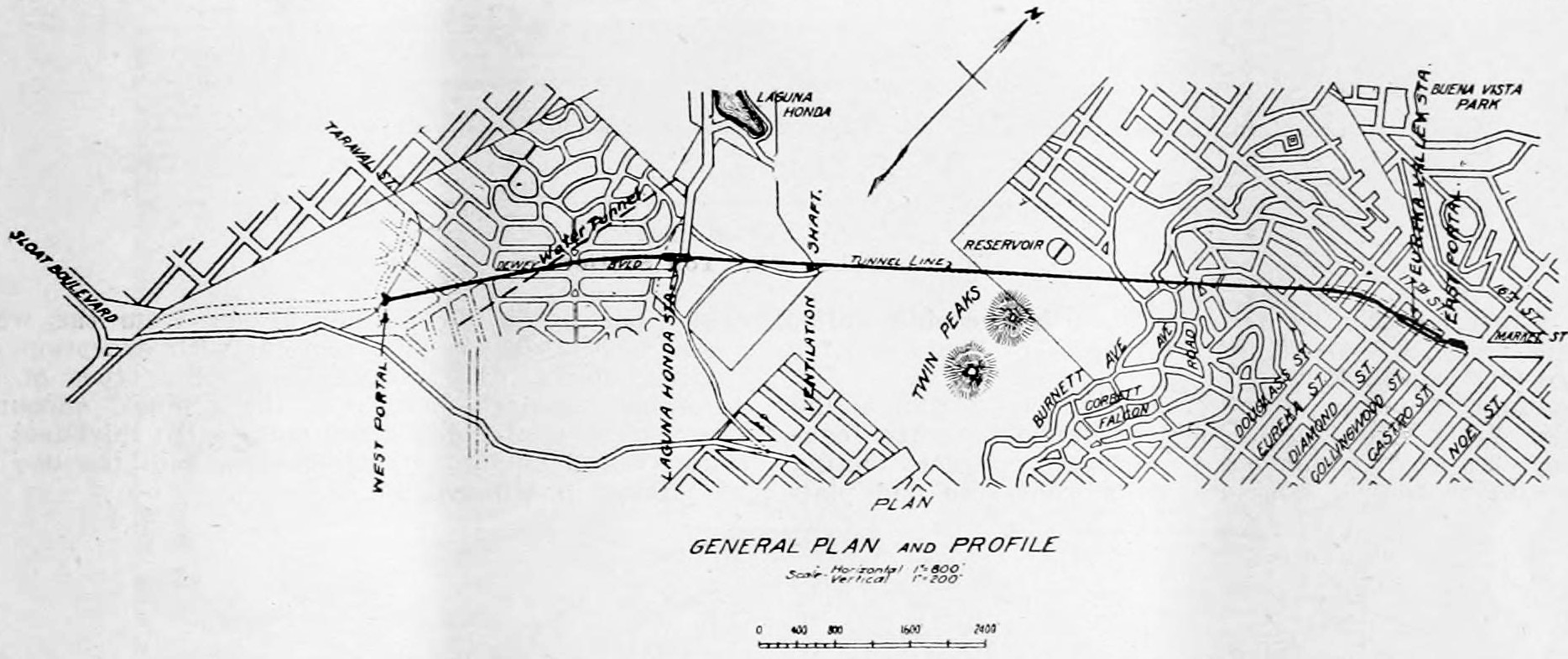
Route of Twin Peaks Tunnel, 1916

=== Incorporation into Muni Metro ===
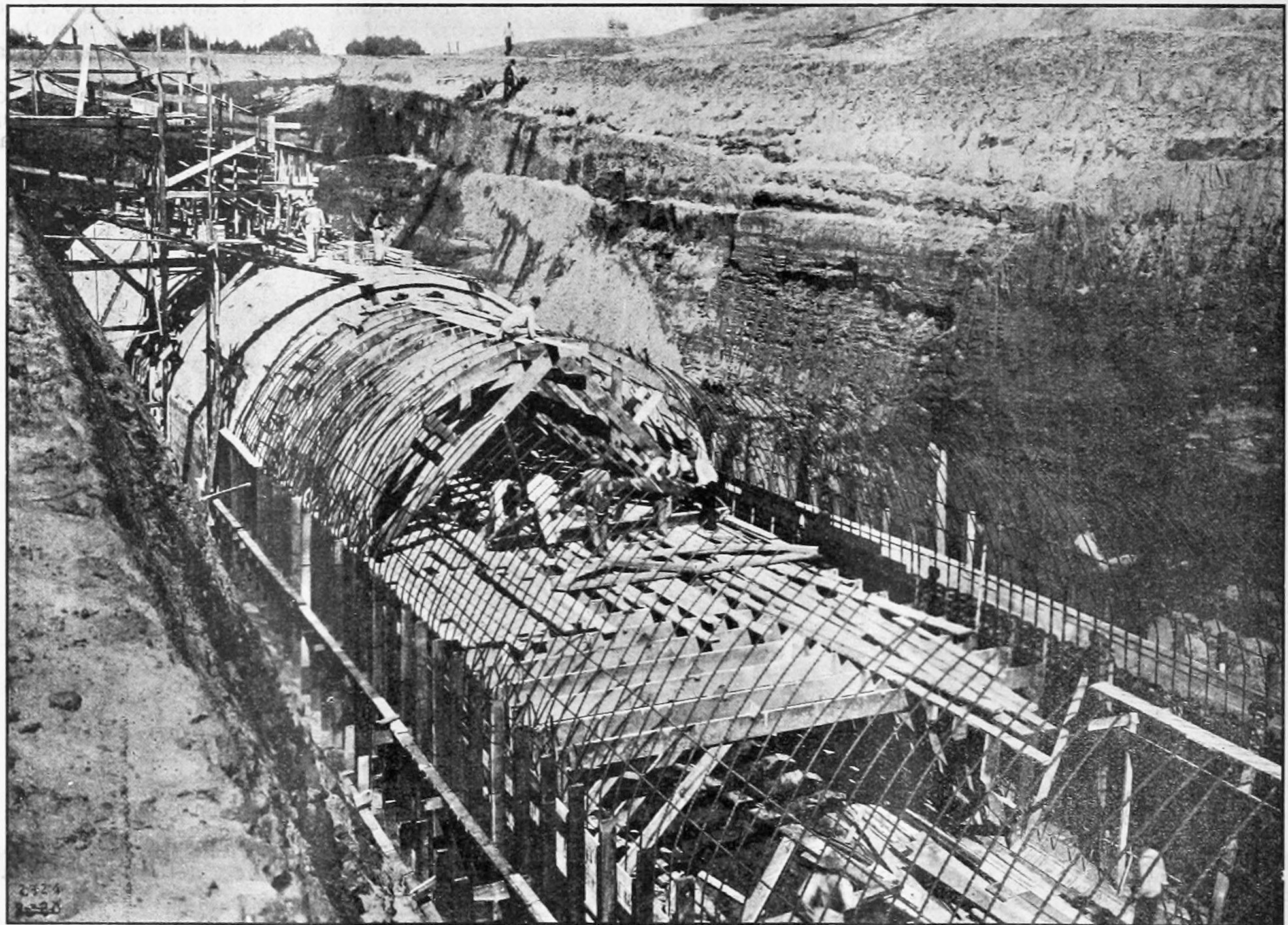
1916

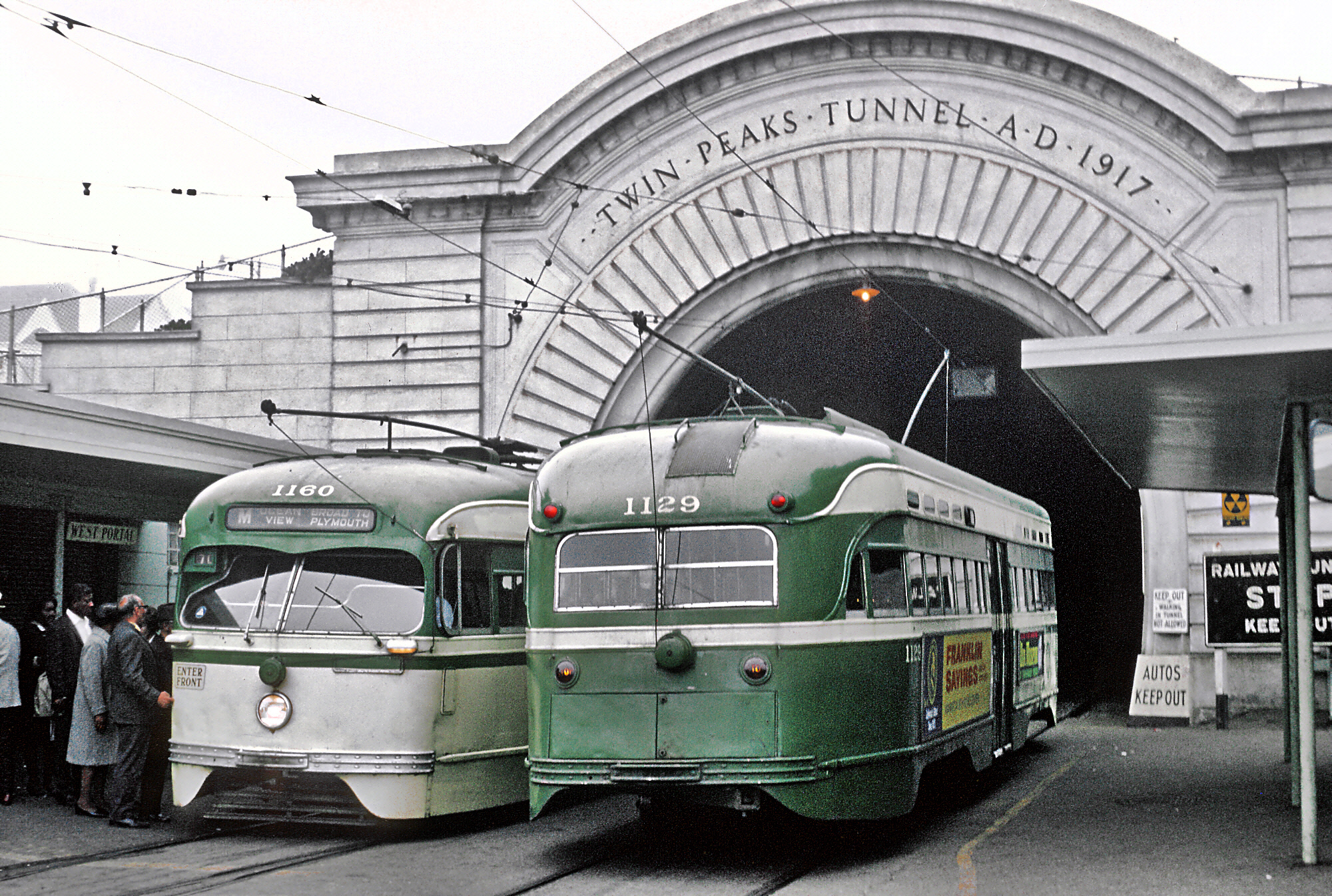
1967

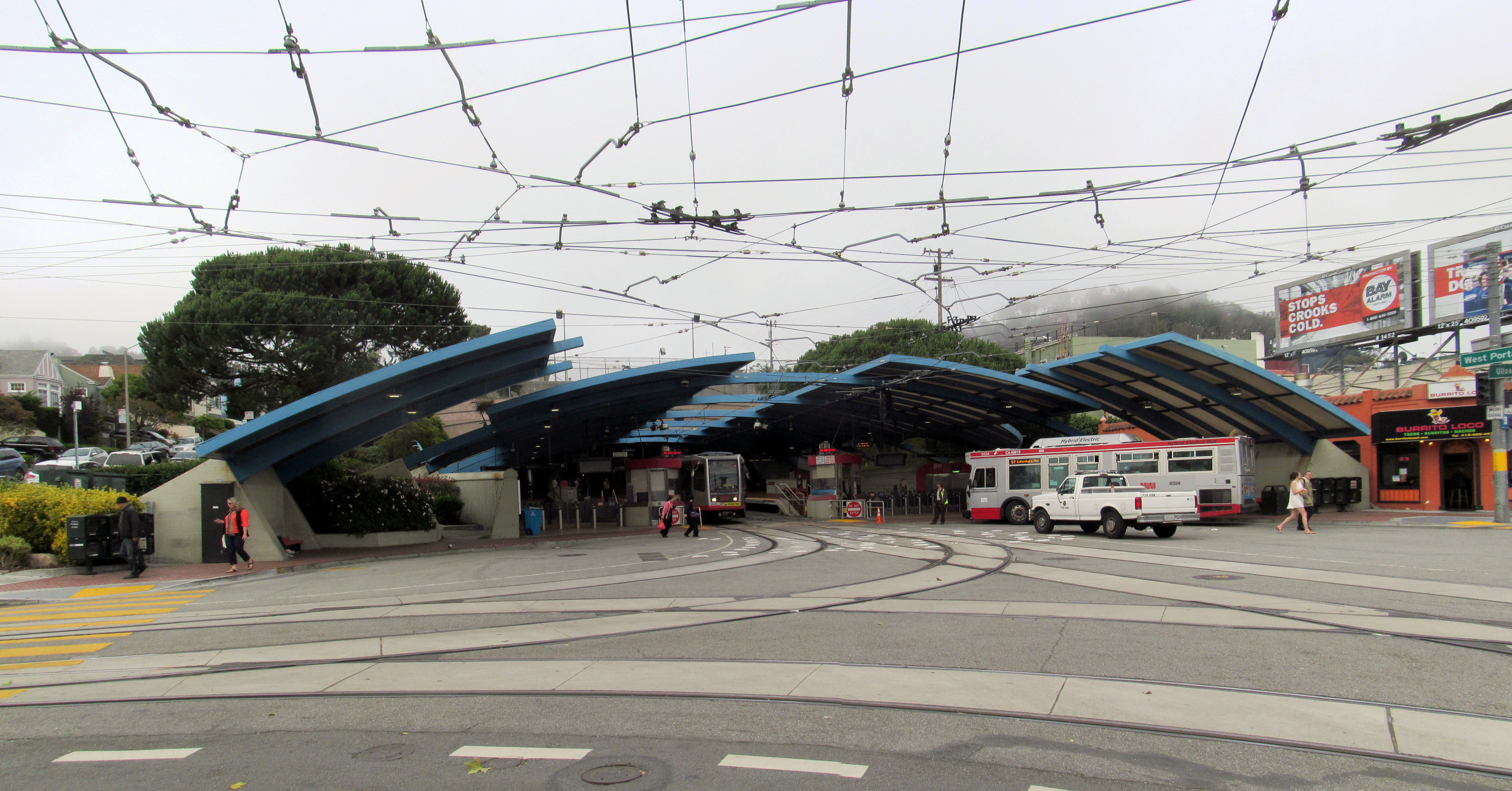
2017

West Portal station, the western tunnel entrance, in 1916 (during construction), 1967 (before the conversion to light rail), and present-day (2017)

The tunnel was built sloping downwards at the east end, anticipating future expansion to a subway under Market Street per Arnold's plan. A technical report was commissioned by the city in 1960 to study possible rapid transit routes. This recommended that the initial line linking BART from a transbay tunnel to Daly City be routed through the Twin Peaks Tunnel. BART's 1961 plan did not include the tunnel connection on Market Street.

When the Market Street subway was built in the early 1970s, it was connected to the Twin Peaks Tunnel to be used by the K Ingleside, L Taraval and M Ocean View lines. These services were spared from conversion to trolleybus by virtue of their use of Twin Peaks Tunnel. The Eureka Valley station was closed and was functionally replaced by Castro Street Station. This combined subway line was the impetus for transitioning the system to light rail and served as the basis of Muni Metro.

The original eastern entrance to the tunnel in the middle of Market Street at Castro was removed and new entrances and ramps were constructed on the sides of the street further up the block. These were connected to track on 17th Street, and in December 1972 the K, L and M lines were diverted via the new East Portal ramps (and via 17th, Church Street and Duboce Avenue, removed from Upper Market) to allow construction of the Muni Metro subway under Upper Market to begin. These newer portals and ramps remained in use by all K-L-M service until 1980.

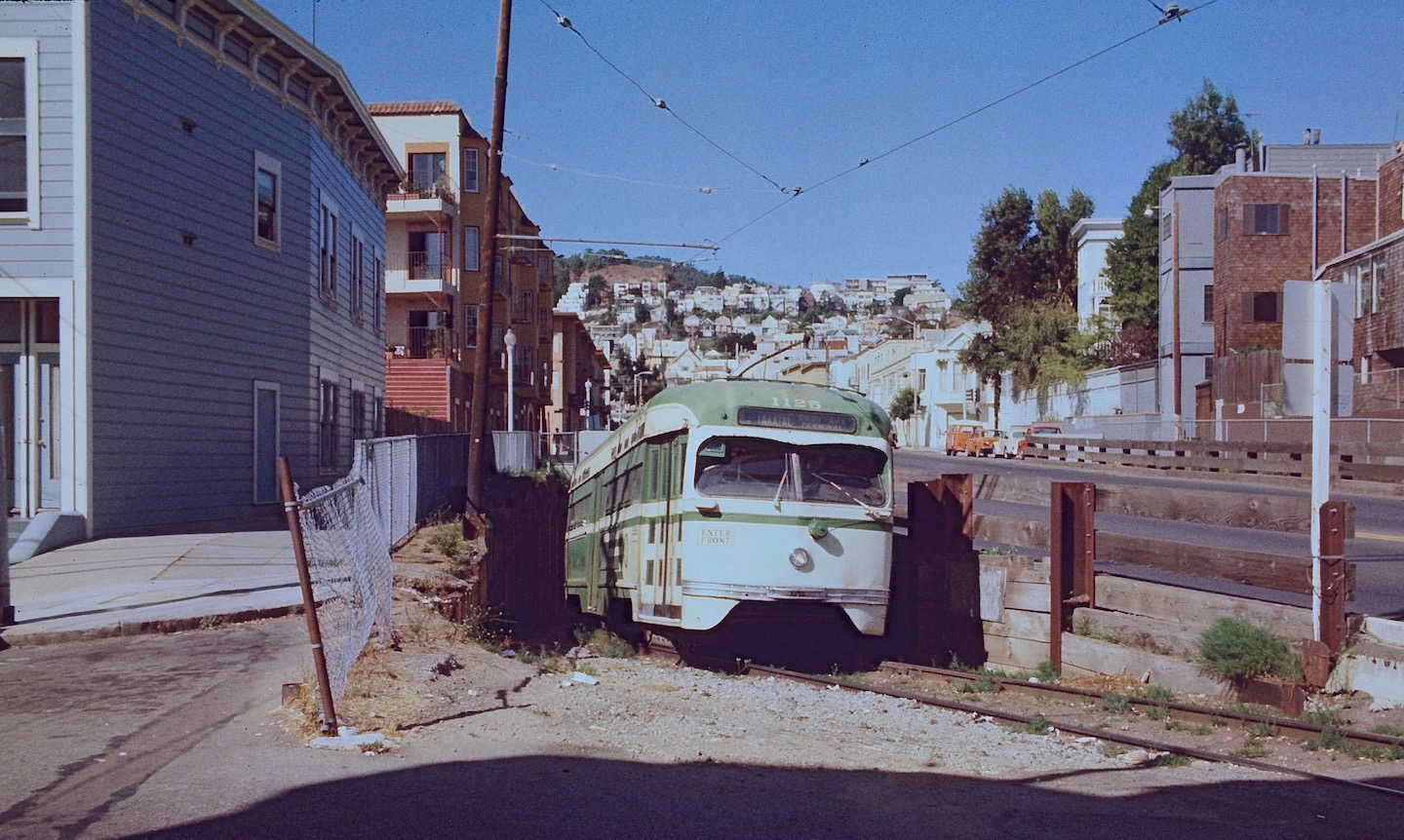
The exit ramp from the eastern portal as rebuilt in 1972, with an PCC car exiting. This remained in regular use until 1982 and intermittently thereafter.

After the Muni Metro subway section between Van Ness station and the Twin Peaks Tunnel opened for use, in December 1980, weekday trains on lines K, L, and M were converted to Boeing LRVs, and trains continued directly from the Market Street subway into the tunnel without going above ground. Weekend service initially remained operated by the old PCC cars and routed along the surface of Market Street, and the subway was closed on weekends. Regular weekend use of the east portal ramps to 17th and Castro finally ended on September 19, 1982, with the conversion of weekend K-L-M service to light rail and the closure of the surface tracks on Market Street – a closure that was planned at the time to be permanent. However, the surface tracks – and the 1972-built Castro portals – came back into use the following summer for the first Historic Trolley Festival, in 1983. Trolley Festival service gradually expanded from being summer-only and five days a week to running May to October and daily for part of the year, and all streetcars on that service reached Market Street from Muni's Metro Rail Center via the Twin Peaks Tunnel and the 1972 portals.

The last Trolley Festival took place in 1987, and by the time its replacement, the F Market line, opened in 1995, its streetcars were able to use the J Church for pull-in and pull-out trips (to and from the carhouse) because the 1991-opened extension of the J line from 30th Street to Balboa Park BART station had provided an alternative routing for streetcars traveling between Metro Rail Center (and the nearby Cameron Beach Yard) and Castro. As a result, there was no need to bring the 1972 portals back into regular use when the F line reopened as a full-time service in 1995. Light rail service briefly used the 1972 portals for two weeks in 1991 (August 19 to September 2), when K-L-M service was diverted via 17th and Church Streets, and entering and leaving the Muni Metro subway via the portal on Duboce Avenue, to permit track work near Castro station.

Forest Hill and Eureka Valley stations were originally constructed with low platforms, as streetcars of that era had steps to load passengers from street level. However, the six new Market Street subway stations were built with high-level platforms for speedier level boarding onto the new Boeing LRVs. West Portal station, which was originally a surface stop outside of the tunnel's western entrance, was rebuilt as a high-platform station located just inside of the entrance. With Eureka Valley station permanently closed, Forest Hill was left as the only low-platform station on the Muni Metro subway. Muni soon modified the station with high-level platforms, completing that project in 1985.

=== COVID-19 impact and attempted restart ===
On March 30, 2020, Muni Metro service, including trains through the Twin Peaks Tunnel, were replaced with buses due to the pandemic.

Light rail service returned on August 22, with the routes reconfigured to improve reliability in the tunnel and at West Portal. K Ingleside and L Taraval services were interlined, running between SF Zoo and Balboa Park and not entering the tunnel, with passengers transferring at West Portal station. M Ocean View and T Third Street services were interlined, running between Sunnydale and Balboa Park station. Longer S Shuttle services operated in the tunnel. The forced transfers at West Portal were criticized by disability advocates.

Service was stopped and substituted with buses just three days later due to a malfunctioning overhead wire splice in the subway and the need to quarantine a control center staff after a COVID-19 case.

On May 15, 2021, Muni Metro rail service resumed the K Ingleside, T Third Street, and S Shuttle lines. K Ingleside and T Third Street services were again interlined (as before the August changes). At that time, some stations were converted to new wayfinding signage based on international standards, with compass directions like "westbound" replacing older "inbound"/"outbound" directions. M Ocean View service resumed on August 14. The L Taraval remained as a bus shuttle due to work on the line. Light rail service through the tunnel ended at 9 p.m. until October 2, when it was extended to 10 p.m. on Sundays and midnight on other days to better align with BART's late night service.

=== Rail replacement project ===
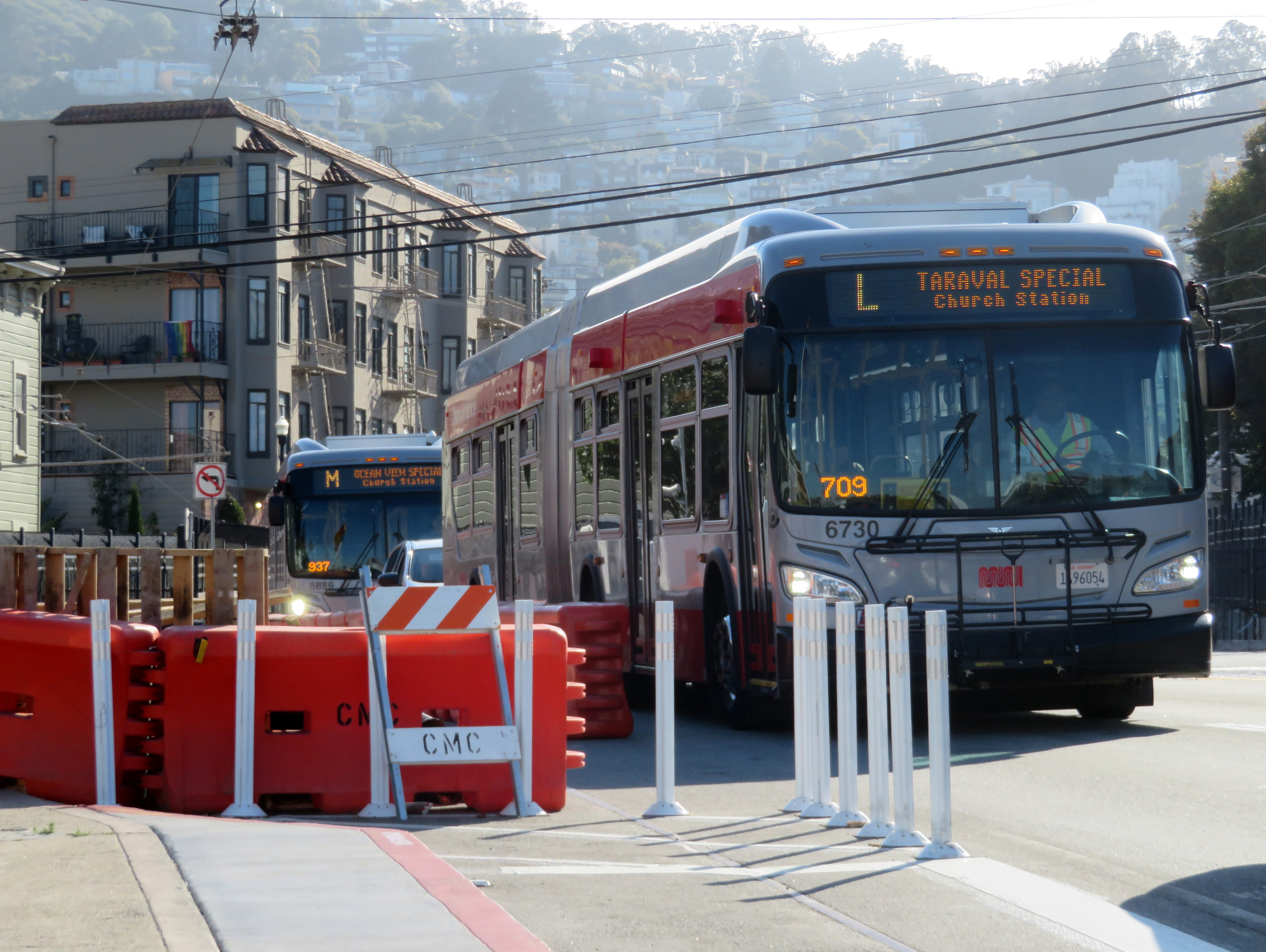
Shuttle buses operating for the suspended rail lines during the tunnel closure in 2018

Around 2014, with the tunnel nearing a century of continuous use, Muni began planning a major track replacement project in the tunnel. The project would include the replacement of all rails and ties in the tunnel with new rails directly fixed to concrete pads, the installation of two pairs of crossovers (one near West Portal, the other just east of Forest Hill), replacement of existing switches to the unused eastern portals, a structural refit in the area of the former Eureka Valley station, replacement of the overhead wires, and a number of other repairs and improvements. The work would lift speed restriction that limited trains to 25 miles per hour (40 km/h) through the tunnel and would allow for the use of two-car trains on the K/T lines.

The construction contract was awarded on April 5, 2016. The project was originally planned to begin in late 2016, but suffered a series of delays. The start date was first pushed to April 2017, then in March 2017 it was pushed to mid-2017 to allow for "additional technical analysis" of the tunnel. In June 2017, the project was indefinitely delayed after the construction contract was terminated. Muni and the contractor could not agree on a new schedule and costs to minimize disruptions to riders; and the project duration increased from 460 days to 807 days and the cost to $48 million. The SFMTA released a Request for Qualifications in October 2017, and bidding opened for the $35.5 million project in November.

Work began on June 25, 2018, and lasted until August 24. During the closure, Muni Metro trains were short turned at Castro station; the surface section of the K Ingleside was through-routed with the J Church, while the L Taraval and M Ocean View were replaced by buses.

Systemwide delays during the summer of 2018 resulted from a combination of the tunnel shutdown and decreased qualified driver availability, which in turn was attributed to the rollout of LRV4s (requiring driver training), and contract issues. Refurbishment work was temporarily suspended after a signal technician was fatally crushed by a steel beam on August 10. The technician was an employee of Shimmick Construction, the firm contracted to handle the refurbishment; Shimmick had been cited for serious and willful safety violations on an unrelated job in 2011 by Cal/OSHA but neglected to disclose those violations during the bidding for the Twin Peaks Tunnel job. Muni was also criticized for inadequate notice of service degradation to bus lines during the closure, since buses were pulled off regular routes to substitute for trains, and for the death during the project.

During the project, it was discovered that the track ballast was contaminated with toxic heavy metals. Muni had planned to replace the ballast, which degrades over time, creating a dust called fines, which can turn to mud when water enters the tunnel. In an effort to save time and avoid the cost of disposal, Muni ordered the ballast to instead be reused, but did not ensure that the contractor followed the proper procedure to thoroughly wash and filter the ballast before it was reused. By November 2020, Muni acknowledged that it had made an "oversight" during the 2018 project and that the ballast was likely to create track stability issues in the Eureka Curve just west of Castro station. Taking advantage of an unscheduled closure of the Muni Metro due to the COVID-19 pandemic, the agency replaced the ballast between November 2020 and February 2021.
