= Castro station =

Muni Metro station in the Castro district of San Francisco, California

Castro
- Inbound train at Castro station in September 2026

General information
- Location: Market Street at Castro Street and 17th Street; San Francisco, California
- Coordinates: 37°45′45″N 122°26′08″W
- Owner: San Francisco Municipal Transportation Agency
- Line: Market Street subway
- Platforms: 2 high level side platforms (underground); 1 low level side platform (surface)
- Tracks: 2 (underground); 2 (surface)
- Connections: Muni: 24, 33, 35, 37

Construction
- Structure type: Underground
- Accessible: Yes
- Architect: Reid & Tarics Associates

History
- Opened: June 11, 1980

Services
Preceding station	Muni	Following station
Forest Hill toward Balboa Park	K Ingleside	Church toward Embarcadero
Forest Hill toward SF Zoo	L Taraval	Church toward Embarcadero
Forest Hill toward San Jose and Geneva (Balboa Park)	M Ocean View	Church toward Embarcadero
Forest Hill toward West Portal	S Shuttle	Church toward Embarcadero
Surface stop at 17th and Castro
Terminus	F Market & Wharves	Market and Noe toward Jones and Beach
Location

Castro station is a Muni Metro station at the intersection of Market Street, Castro Street, and 17th Street in the Castro District of San Francisco, California. The underground station is served by the K Ingleside, M Ocean View, L Taraval and S Shuttle lines. The F Market & Wharves line serves the station on the street level at 17th and Castro.

== Station layout and history ==
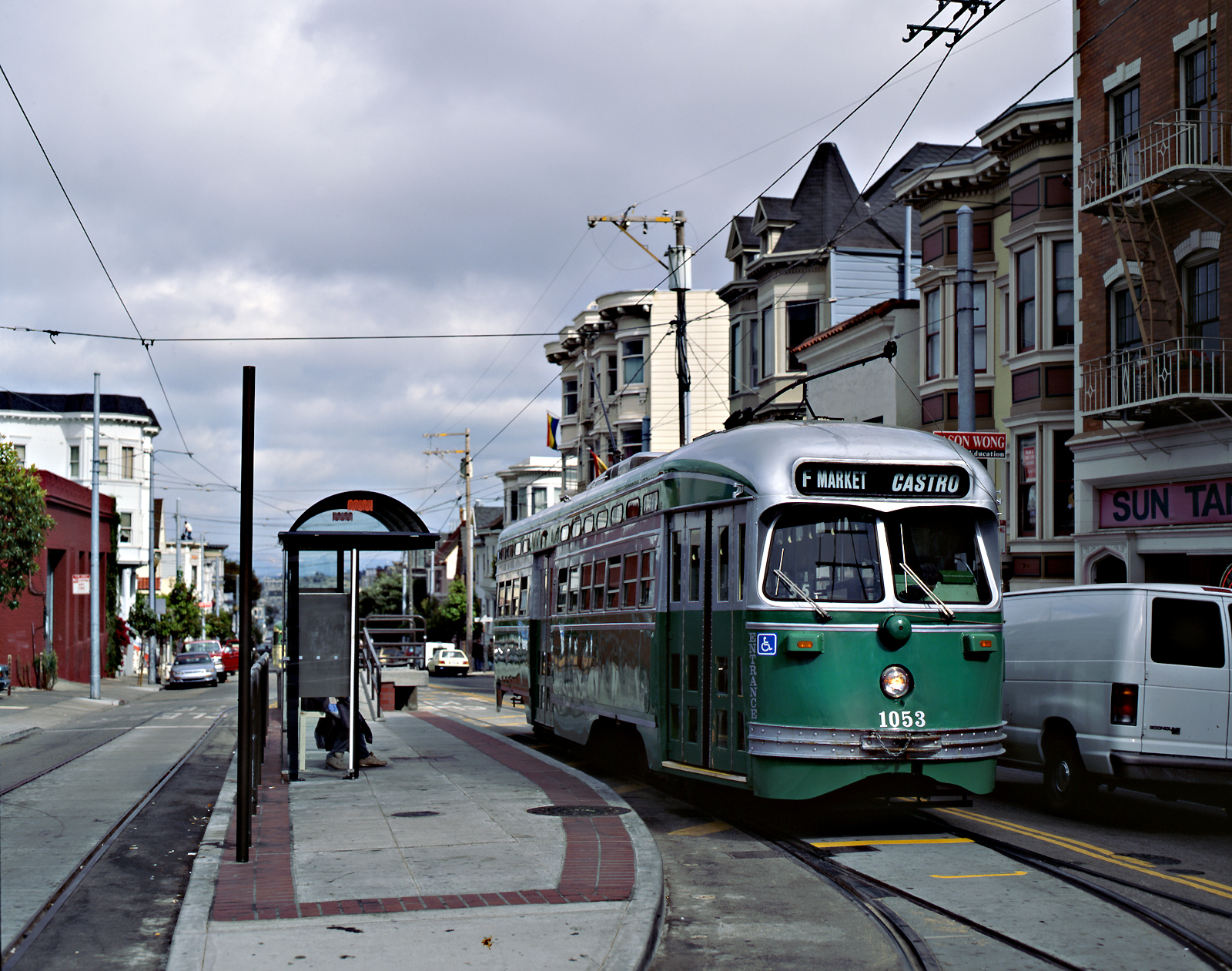
F Market streetcar on the surface at 17th and Castro in 1999

The station consists of two side platforms next to the tracks on the second level down with the concourse mezzanine level overlooking it. Uniquely among Muni Metro stations, the platforms are slightly curved due to the transition from the Market Street subway to the Twin Peaks Tunnel between this station and the now-disused Eureka Valley station, just southwest. At both Castro and Church, there is only one entrance on each side of Market Street leading into the station. (All other stations on the Market Street subway have entrances spread out along the length of the station.) The southern entrance is located in Harvey Milk Plaza on the southwest corner of Market and Castro, and the northern entrance and street elevator on the northwest corner of Market and 17th.

The station was constructed by BART as part of the Market Street subway. The BART Board approved the name "Castro" in December 1965. It was designed by Howard Grant AIA of Reid & Tarics Associates and was completed in 1976. Service at the station began on June 11, 1980.

Castro station features a transit plaza at the corner of Castro Street and Market Street. In 1985 it was dedicated to Harvey Milk, the slain SF supervisor and first openly gay elected official in California. In May 2016, the escalator in Harvey Milk Plaza was retrofitted with colored lights (to resemble the rainbow flag that flies above the plaza) after being rehabilitated. This test was considered a success; lights were added to 17 other escalators in the system, including the other three escalators at Castro, in 2018–19.

Muni is constructing accessibility improvements, including a second elevator, in Harvey Milk Plaza at the south entrance of the station. A 2020 determination that the plaza is eligible for inclusion on the California Register of Historical Resources was not expected to impact elevator construction, but could stall the larger plaza project. Elevator construction began in June 2023. The elevator will have stops at street level, plaza level, and station lobby level, plus an emergency-only stop at the eastbound platform. As of June 2026, the elevator is expected to open in July 2026.

In 2022, a new decorative railing was added on the F Market & Wharves boarding island as part of the Upper Market Street Safety Project. It features a quote from Harvey Milk's 1977 "You've Got to Have Hope" speech, as well as an illustration of streetcar #1051, which is dedicated in Milk's honor.
