= Presidio Go Shuttle =

Public transit system in San Francisco, California, United States

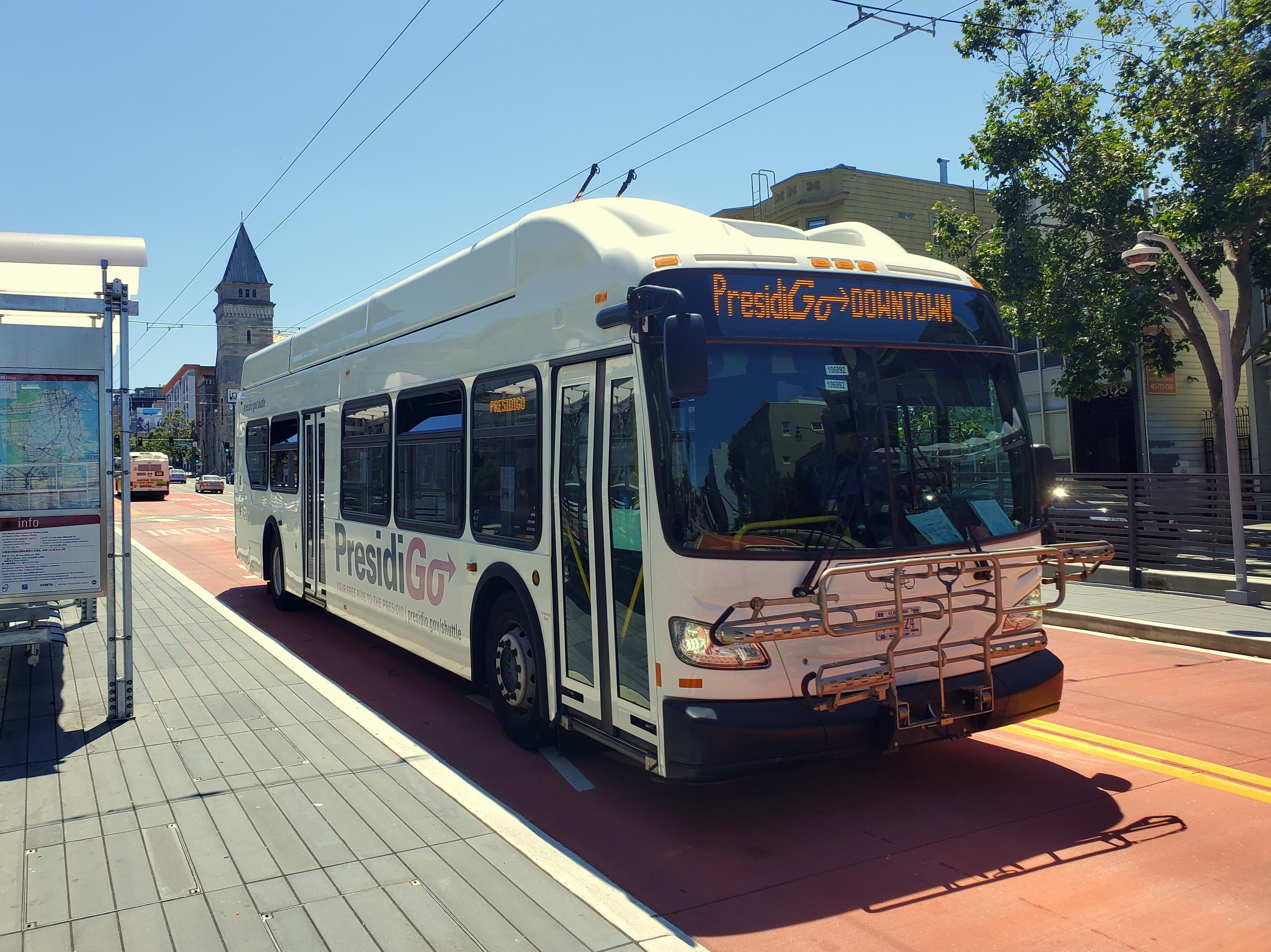
- A PresidiGo bus on Van Ness Avenue in 2023
- Founded: 2005
- Headquarters: 103 Montgomery Street, San Francisco
- Locale: Presidio of San Francisco
- Service type: Shuttle bus
- Routes: 2
- Hubs: Presidio Transit Center
- Annual ridership: 635,000 (2019)
- Fuel type: Compressed natural gas
- Operator: MV Transportation
- Website: www.presidio.gov/transportation/presidigo
System map

Presidio Go Shuttle (formerly PresidiGo) is a public transit system in San Francisco, California serving the San Francisco Presidio. The service includes two routes: the "South Hills" route providing circulator service within the Presidio, and the "Downtown" route connecting to Embarcadero station and the Salesforce Transit Center in downtown San Francisco. (A second circulator route, the "Crissy Field" route, was discontinued in 2020 due to low ridership.) The routes connect at the Presidio Transit Center, which is also served by Muni bus route 43. The service is nominally free public transport, although a rider pass or Muni Visitor Passport is required for some trips during rush hours. Operations are contracted to MV Transportation and are overseen by the Presidio Trust.

The service uses nine buses: three cutaway buses for the circulator route, and six larger buses (five ElDorado National XHF and one New Flyer XN40) for the downtown route. The buses use compressed natural gas (CNG) fuel and are stored in a facility at Fort Scott. As of July 2020, the Presidio Trust plans to order 2 BYD battery electric buses to replace the current CNG cutaway buses used on the circulator route. The buses are expected to enter service in September 2021. The first BYD electric bus arrived in early 2023 and entered service in February 2023. The second BYD bus is anticipated to arrive in 2024, almost 3 years behind the initial schedule.
