= Embarcadero station =

Subway station in San Francisco, California, US

Embarcadero
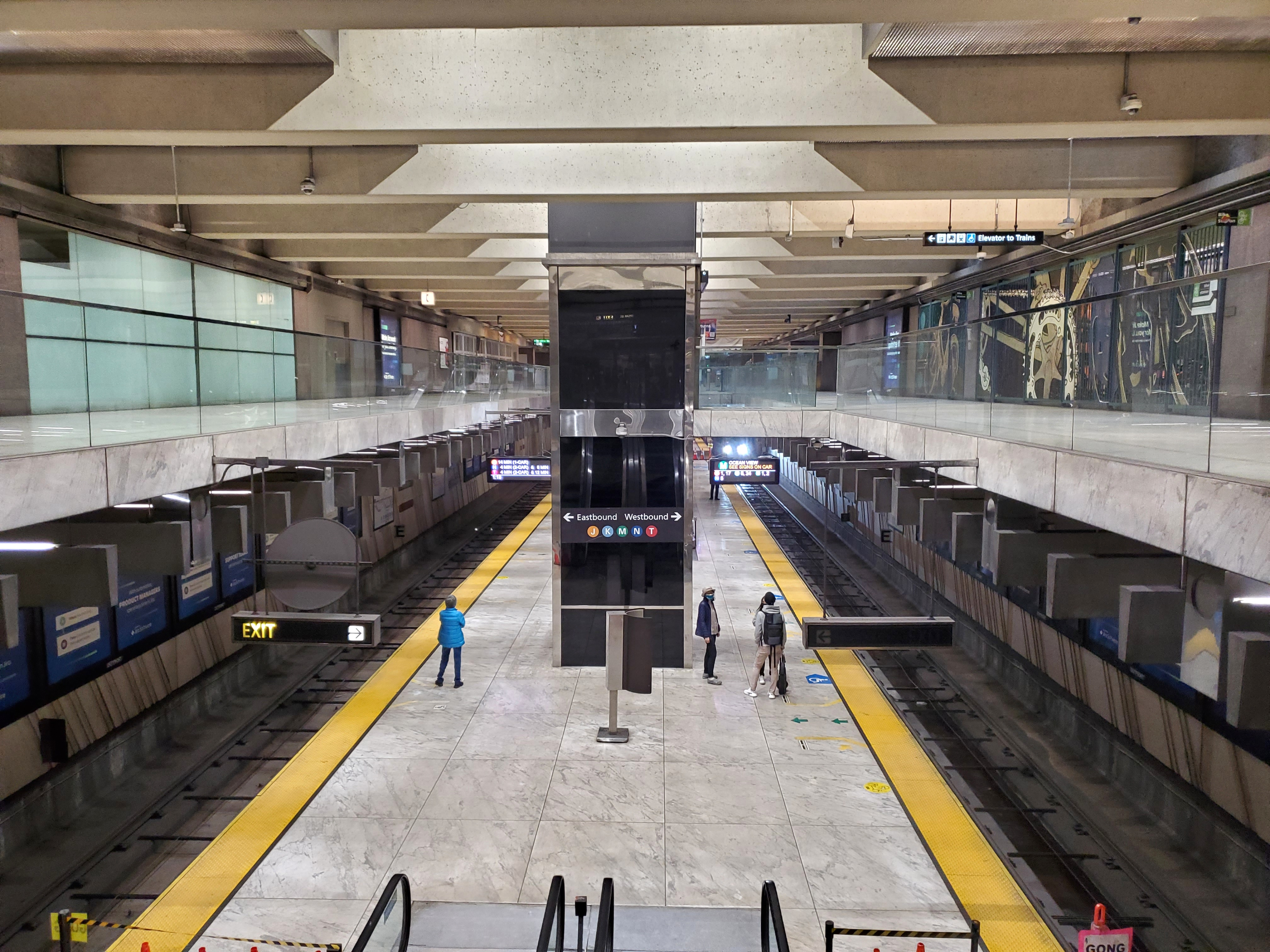
- Muni Metro platform as seen from the mezzanine level of Embarcadero station in 2022

General information
- Location: 298 Market Street; San Francisco, California
- Coordinates: 37°47′35″N 122°23′50″W
- Owner: San Francisco Bay Area Rapid Transit District
- Lines: Market Street subway BART M-Line
- Platforms: 1 island platform (BART); 1 island platform (Muni Metro); 2 side platforms (Muni surface)
- Tracks: 2 wide gauge (BART); 2 standard gauge (Muni Metro); 2 standard gauge (Muni surface)
- Connections: Muni, Golden Gate Transit, PresidiGo, SamTrans, Amtrak Thruway; California St.; Golden Gate Ferry, San Francisco Bay Ferry, Treasure Island Ferry (at Ferry Building)

Construction
- Structure type: Underground
- Cycle facilities: Parking station
- Accessible: Yes
- Architect: Tallie B. Maule; Hertzka & Knowles

Other information
- Station code: BART: EMBR
- Website: bart.gov/stations/embr

History
- Opened: May 27, 1976 (BART); February 18, 1980 (Muni)

Passengers
- 2025: 16,477 (weekday average) (BART)
Services
Preceding station	Bay Area Rapid Transit	Following station
Montgomery toward Daly City	Blue Line	West Oakland toward Dublin/Pleasanton
Montgomery toward Daly City	Green Line	West Oakland toward Berryessa
Montgomery toward Millbrae	Red Line	West Oakland toward Richmond
Montgomery toward SFO or Millbrae	Yellow Line	West Oakland toward Antioch via Pittsburg/Bay Point
Preceding station	Muni	Following station
Montgomery toward Balboa Park	J Church	Terminus
Montgomery toward Balboa Park	K Ingleside	Terminus
Montgomery toward SF Zoo	L Taraval	Terminus
Montgomery toward San Jose and Geneva (Balboa Park)	M Ocean View	Terminus
Montgomery toward Ocean Beach	N Judah	Folsom toward 4th and King
Montgomery toward West Portal	S Shuttle	Terminus
At Market and Main / Market and Drumm
Market and 1st Street / Market and Battery toward 17th Street and Castro	F Market & Wharves	Don Chee Way and Steuart toward Jones and Beach
Location

Embarcadero station is a combined BART and Muni Metro rapid transit subway station in the Market Street subway in downtown San Francisco. Located under Market Street between Drumm Street and Beale Street near The Embarcadero, it serves the Financial District neighborhood and surrounding areas. The three-level station has a large fare mezzanine level, with separate platform levels for Muni Metro and BART below. Embarcadero station opened in May 1976 – almost two years after service began through the Transbay Tube – as an infill station.

Embarcadero and nearby Montgomery Street stations are typically the two busiest in the BART system. The station is served by the BART Blue, Green, Red and Yellow lines, and the Muni Metro J Church, K Ingleside, L Taraval, M Ocean View, N Judah, and S Shuttle lines. A major Bay Area transit hub, Embarcadero is also served by numerous bus routes of several other agencies which stop above the station and on surrounding streets.

== Station layout ==
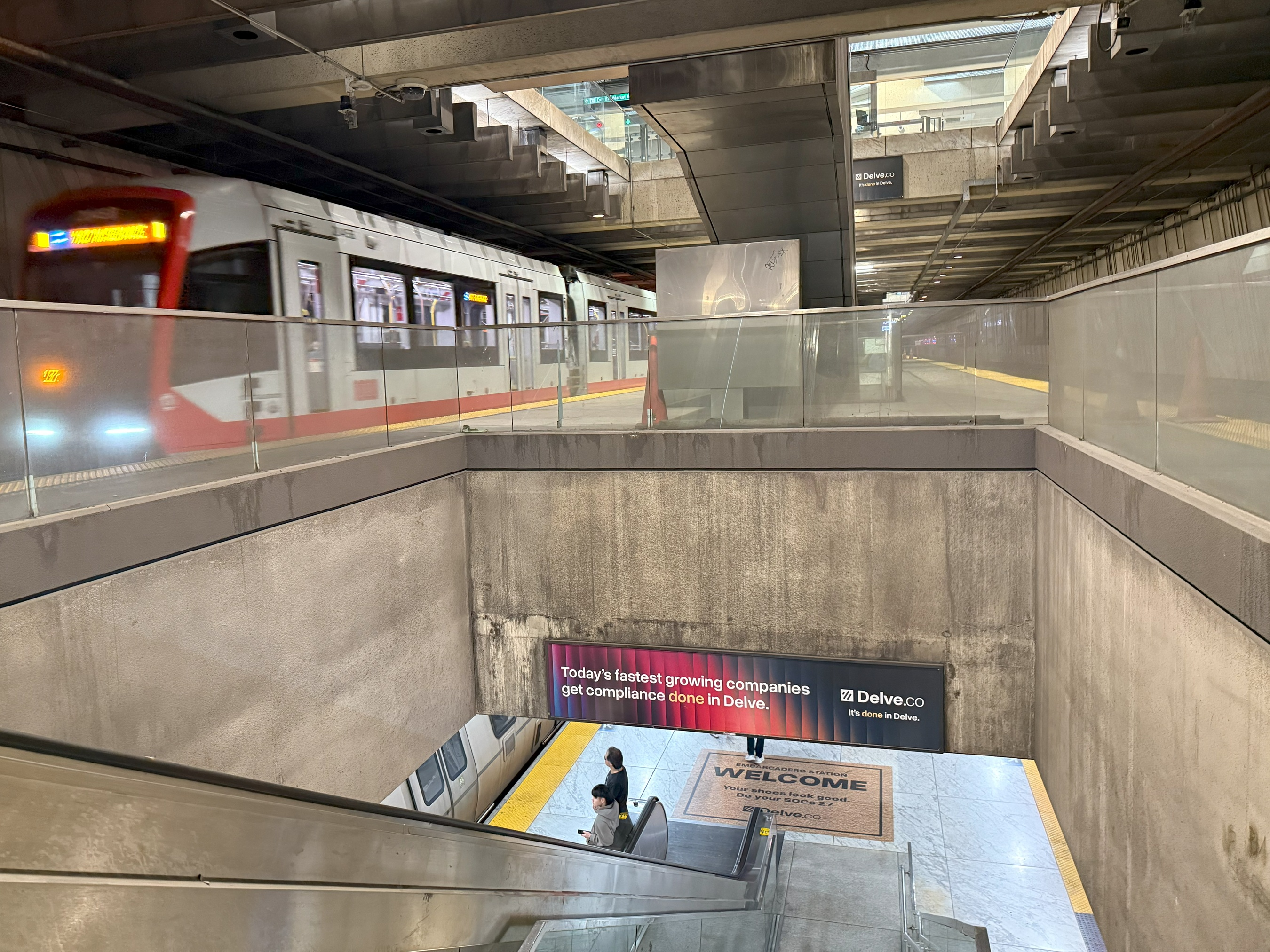
Muni K and BART trains at the station in 2025. No direct connection exists between the two platforms.

Like the three other shared Muni/BART stations in the Market Street subway, Embarcadero has three underground levels. The uppermost level is a fare mezzanine, with one Muni paid area in the middle flanked by two BART paid areas. The second level has a single island platform (of which only the center portion is used) for Muni Metro, and the third level has an island platform for BART. The station is narrower than the other three – 50 feet (15 m) rather than 60 feet (18 m) – because of adjacent buildings and the high water table. It has six street entrances along its length. The station contains an unused underground entrance to the 388 Market Street building.

== History ==
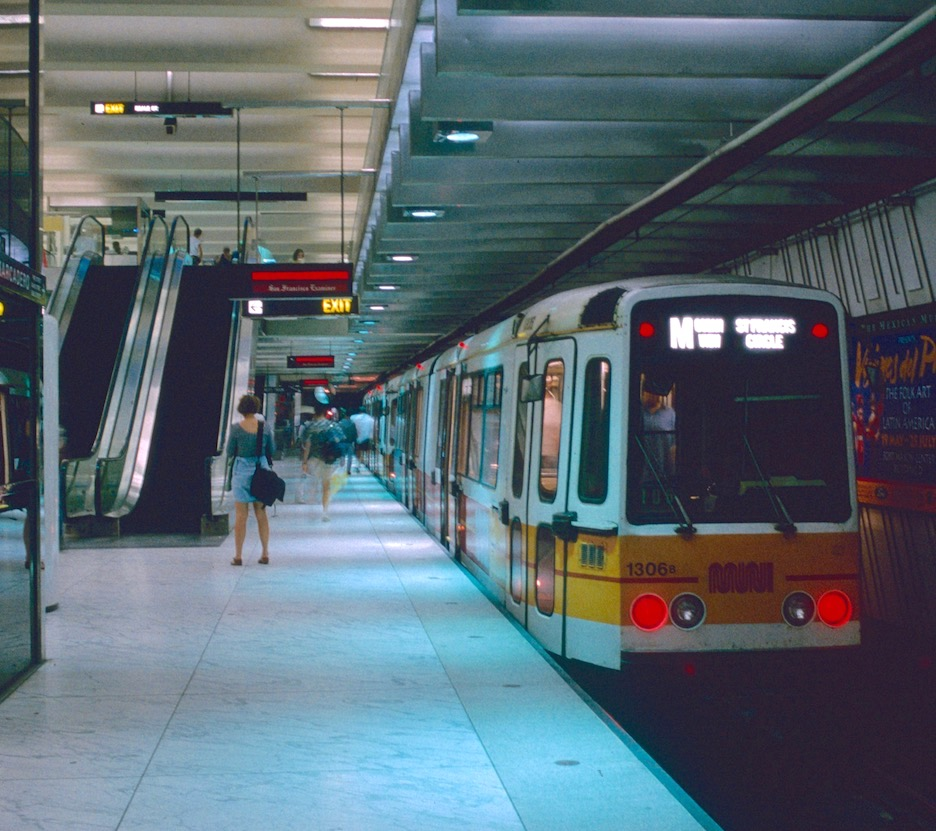
A Muni Metro train at Embarcadero in 1993

The BART Board approved the name "Embarcadero" in December 1965. At that time, it was only planned to be used for Muni Metro. BART service at the station began on May 27, 1976, three years after the other San Francisco stations. As a result of increasing development in the lower Market Street area, the basic structure of the station was added into the construction of the Market Street subway, anticipating a later opening. This resulted in the Embarcadero station having a different design than the other three Market Street stations. The station was designed by chief BART architect Tallie Maule and Hertzka & Knowles & Associates in collaboration with Parsons Brinckerhoff, Tudor Construction, and Bechtel. The station cost $30 million to construct.

Muni Metro service began in February 1980 and Embarcadero was originally intended to be the inbound terminus for all of the Muni Metro lines. In 1998 a new southward extension was opened, extending the N Judah along the Embarcadero to the Caltrain station at 4th and King Streets. On March 4, 2000, F Market & Wharves streetcar service was extended northward to Fisherman's Wharf, with new stops above Embarcadero station at Main Street (inbound) and Drumm Street (outbound). Because the station is adjacent to the Transbay Tube, brake dust and other particles from train operations coat the walls of the station. A sandblasting in 2014 revealed the original white terrazzo platform walls under the dark grime.

Since before 1992, the station was serenaded by Ronald Brewington, known as the "Jazz Man". He would play saxophone for commuters, and entertain them with conversation and charm. He claimed his name was Garrick Sherrod; however, that was an identity he had stolen. The Jazz Man was actually a fugitive from Albuquerque facing capital murder charges stemming from the 1987 death of his wife Diedre. He was arrested at a BART station in 2012, and extradited to New Mexico. In 2013, he pleaded guilty to the murder and was sentenced to 16 years in prison.

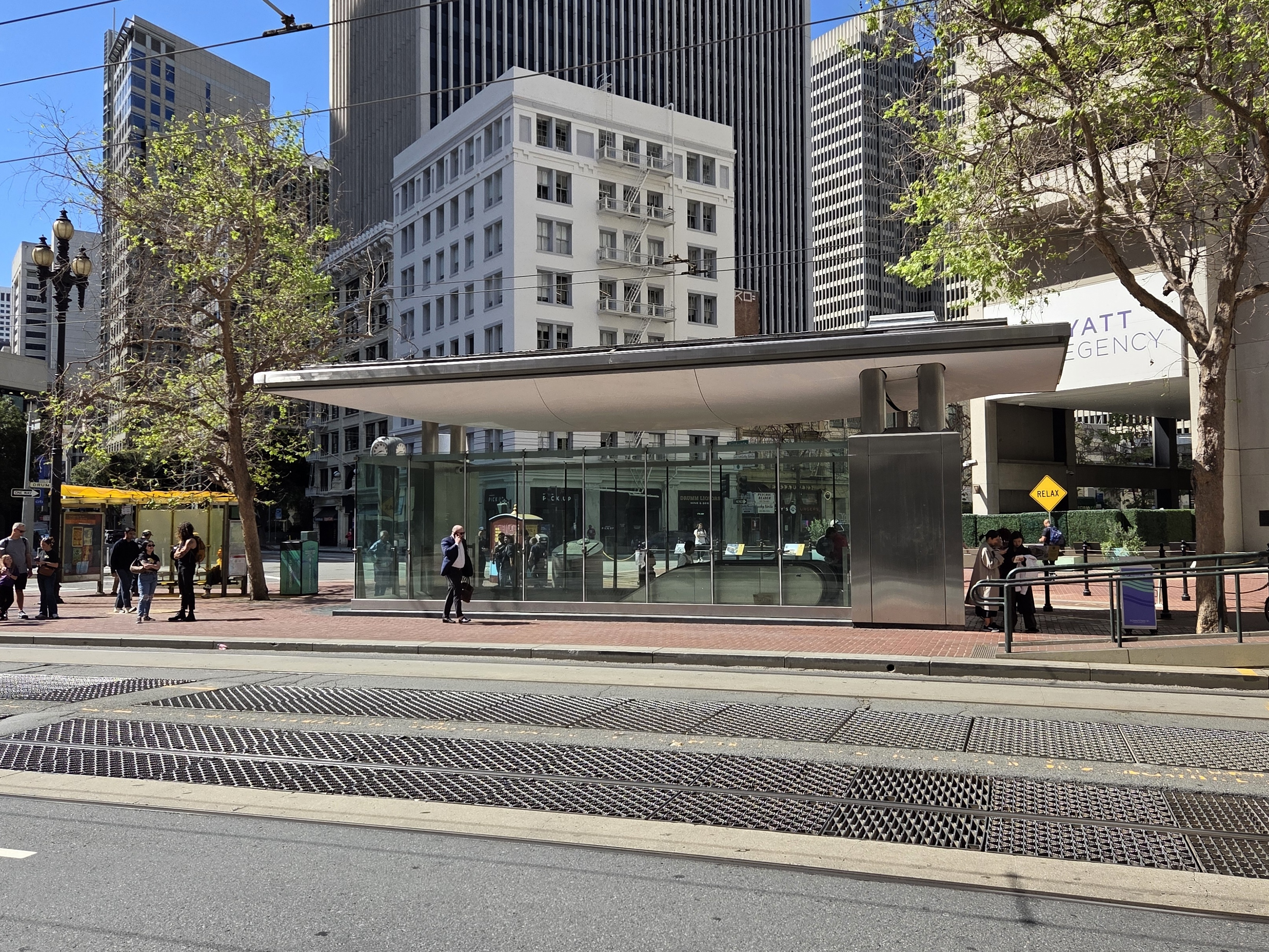
The 2025-opened canopy at Drumm Street

Following the 2015 addition of a canopy over an escalator at 19th Street Oakland station, which reduced escalator downtime by one-third, BART decided to add canopies to all downtown Oakland and San Francisco entrances. Construction of the Market Street entrances was to begin in 2020, with completion in 2027. The entrances on the southern side of the station were closed from April 13, 2020, to May 15, 2021, due to low ridership during the COVID-19 pandemic. Concourse-level preparation for canopy construction at Embarcadero station began on November 15, 2021. The entrance at Davis Street was closed for canopy construction from June 13, 2022 until October 2023, followed by the Beale Street entrance from September 5, 2023, to March 2024. The Federal Reserve Bank entrance was closed for construction on October 18, 2023; the Pine Street entrance closed on March 14, 2024. A canopy at the Drumm Street entrance opened in January 2025. The canopies at Embarcadero station include artwork entitled We Touch Here by Norie Sato.

Thirteen BART stations, including Embarcadero, did not originally have faregates for passengers using the elevator. In 2020, BART started a project to add faregates to elevators at these stations. The new faregate on the platform at Embarcadero was installed in December 2021. This allows passengers using the elevator to enter and exit fare control through the faregate, rather than having to use a "difficult and cumbersome" process of tagging in or out at the concourse faregates. Bathrooms at underground BART stations were closed after the September 11 (2001) attacks due to security concerns. The bathroom at Embarcadero station reopened on June 30, 2023, after a renovation, with an attendant on duty during all operating hours.

=== Artwork ===
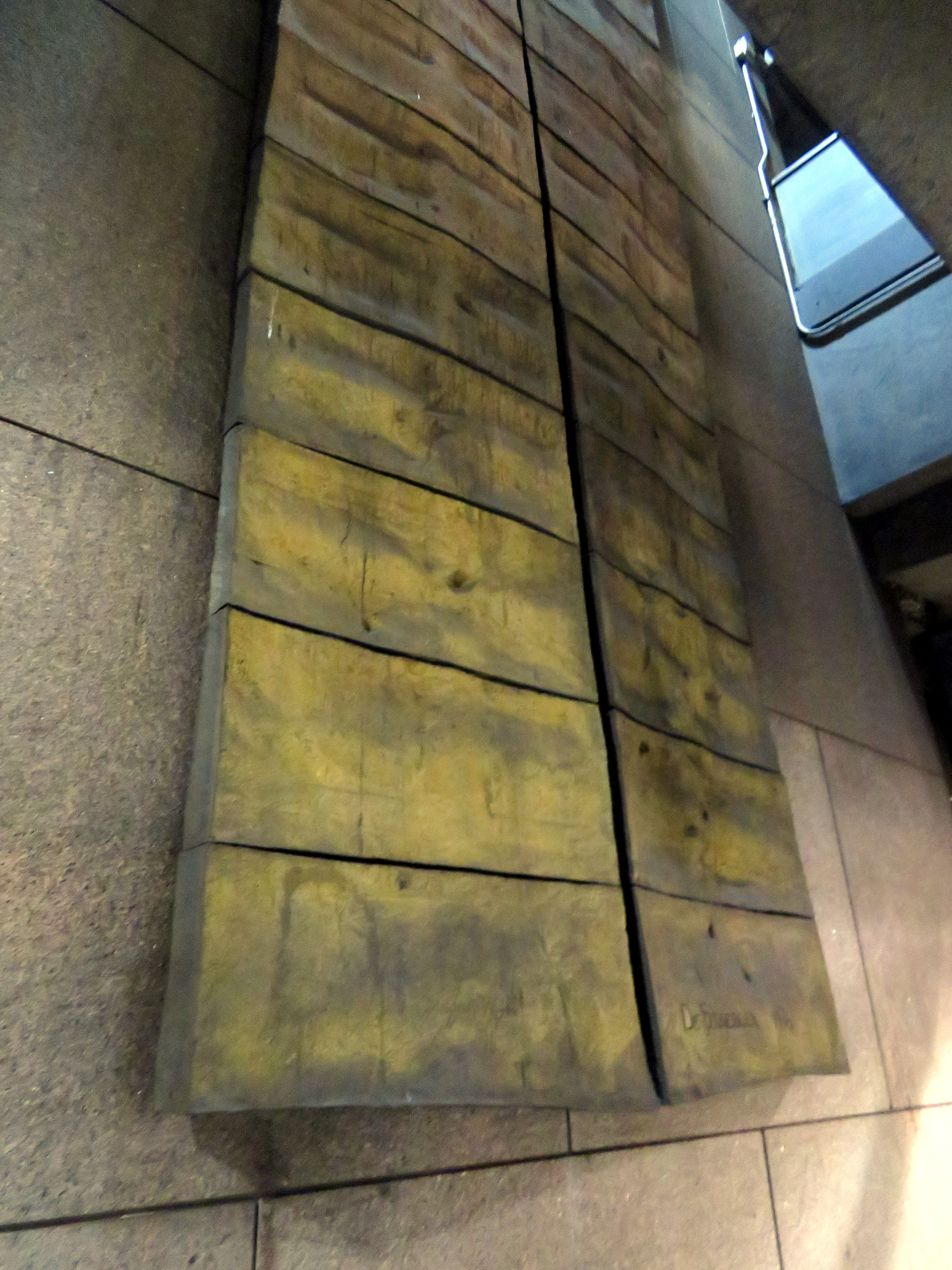
The bottom part of Wall Canyon

Although original plans to include public art at every BART station did not come to fruition, several artworks were included in Embarcadero station. The platform walls and street entrances feature circle-based reliefs by William Mitchell. Wall Canyon, a 37-foot (11 m)-high colored ceramic relief by Stephen De Staebler, is partially hidden behind a staircase at the southwest end of the station. It was installed on January 1, 1977. A duotone granite portrait of Tallie Maule – the chief architect of the original BART system – is on the mezzanine level.

A 50-foot (15 m)-tall, 7,000-pound (3,200 kg) rope sculpture called Legs was installed at the northwest end of the station in 1976 or 1978. Created by Barbara Shawcroft, the orange-and-white Nomex sculpture moved with the breeze from passing Muni and BART trains. Legs soon accumulated the same dark grime as the station walls, hiding the original color. BART was required by the artist's contract to clean the sculpture but several attempts were unsuccessful. In 2013, BART included removal of Legs in its 2014 budget, which prompted a debate about whether it should be cleaned regardless of cost (which Shawcroft supported), or removed from the unsuitable environment of the station. The sculpture was removed in June 2014 and returned to Shawcroft – a professor emerita at UC Davis School of Design – who planned to repurpose it into other pieces.

== Connections ==
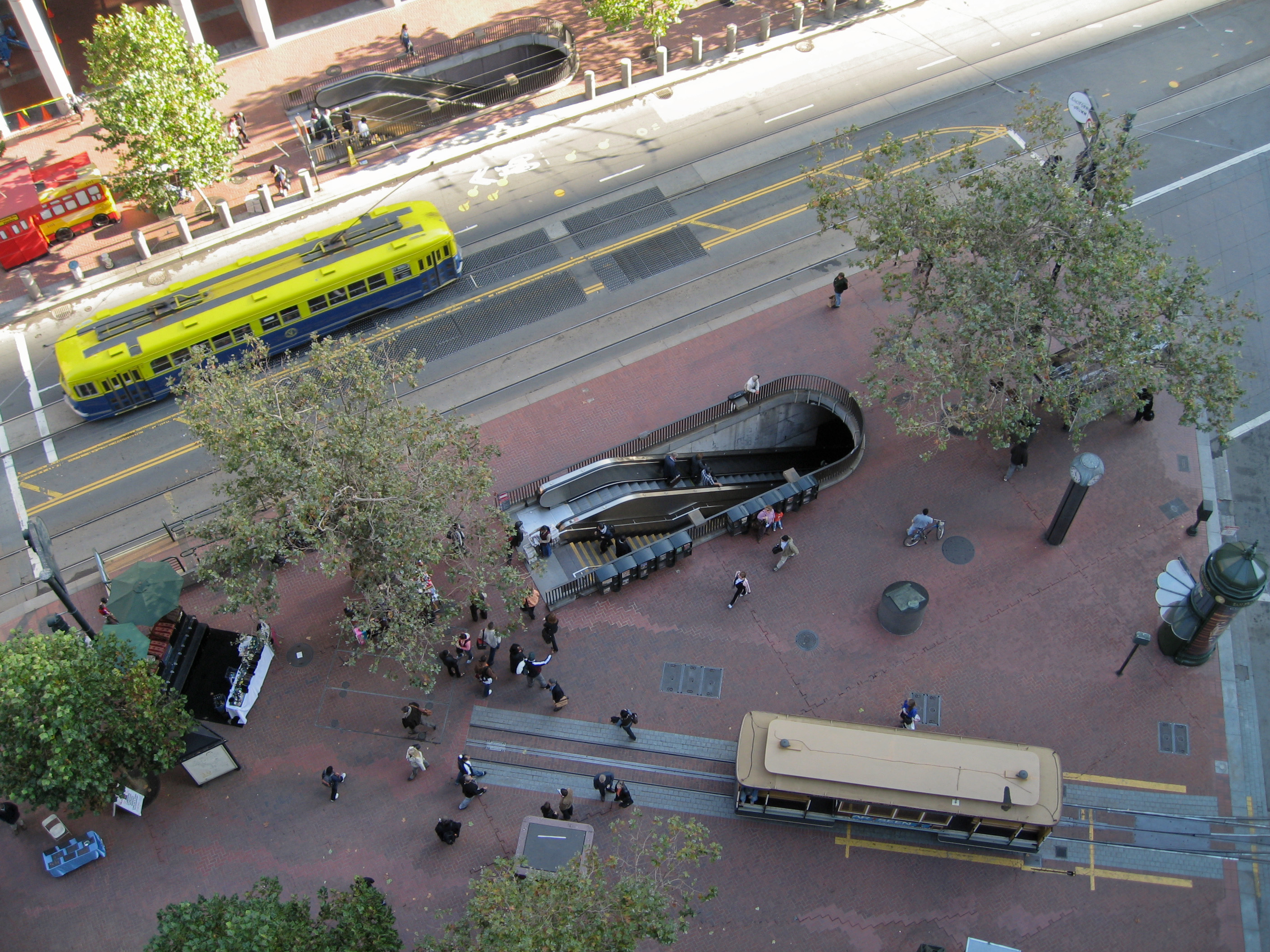
The intersection of Market Street and Drumm Street prior to construction of canopies. Embarcadero station entrances can be seen in the center and top left. An F Market & Wharves streetcar is running east on Market Street (left, just above center) and a California Street line cable car waits in the pinch tracks (lower right).

Embarcadero station is located in the busy Financial District; numerous routes by several transit providers stop at or near the station. Most radial Muni bus routes terminate at several nearby locations:

- Ferry Plaza: 2, 6, 7X, 9, 14, K Owl, M Owl
- Salesforce Transit Center, with intermediate stops on Market Street near Embarcadero: 5, 5R, 7, 38, 38R

Other Muni routes that stop or terminate near the station include routes 1, 9R, 14R, 30X, 41, 714, J Bus, K Bus, K Owl, L Bus, L Owl, M Bus, N Owl, and N Bus. The California Street line of the San Francisco cable car system terminates adjacent to the Drumm Street station entrance. Muni's F Market and Wharves heritage streetcar line stops on the surface at Market and Main (westbound) and Market and Drumm (eastbound).

A number of Golden Gate Transit bus routes stop near Embarcadero. Other transit agencies that stop nearby include SamTrans (292, 397, 398, 713, FCX) and PresidiGo (Downtown Shuttle).

Embarcadero station is the nearest Muni Metro and BART station to the Ferry Building, the primary San Francisco terminal for Golden Gate Ferry, San Francisco Bay Ferry and Treasure Island Ferry. The Salesforce Transit Center, located about 1/4 mile (0.40 km) to the south, is the primary San Francisco terminal for AC Transit transbay routes, WestCAT, Greyhound lines, Amtrak Thruway buses (at 401 Mission), some Golden Gate Transit routes, and Muni route 25. The second phase of the Salesforce Transit Center – the Downtown Rail Extension (now known as The Portal) – will include an 800-foot (240 m)-long pedestrian tunnel under Beale Street connecting Embarcadero station with the underground rail concourse.
