= Market Street subway =

BART-Muni Metro main line, San Francisco

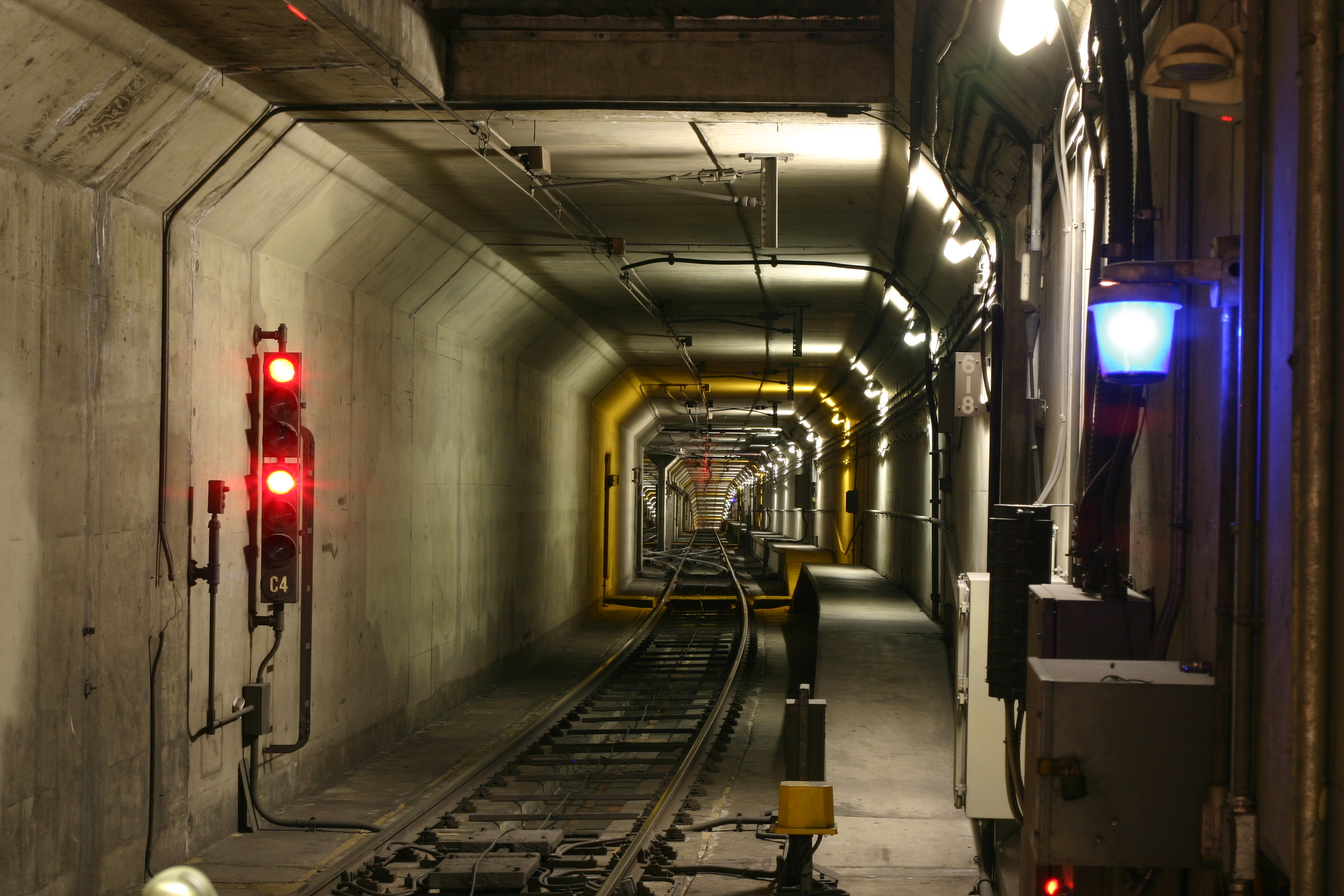
- Muni Metro subway east of Castro station

Overview
- Owner: San Francisco Bay Area Rapid Transit District
- Locale: Market Street, San Francisco, California
- Termini: Embarcadero station; Castro station
- Stations: 7

Service
- Type: Rapid transit and Light rail/Streetcar
- System: BART, Muni Metro

History
- Opened: BART: November 5, 1973; Muni Metro: February 18, 1980

Technical
- Character: Two level cut-and-cover rapid transit and light rail subway
- Track gauge: BART: 5 ft 6 in (1,676 mm); Muni Metro: 4 ft 8 1/2 in (1,435 mm) standard gauge
- Electrification: BART: Third rail, 1 kV DC; Muni Metro: Overhead line, 600 V DC

The Market Street subway is a two-level rail subway that carries Muni Metro and BART trains under Market Street in San Francisco, California. It runs under the length of Market Street between Embarcadero station and Castro station. The upper level is used by Muni Metro lines and the lower level is used by BART lines. BART does not run through the whole subway; it turns south and runs under Mission Street southwest of Civic Center/UN Plaza station. The northeastern end of the BART level is connected to the Transbay Tube. On the Muni Metro level, the southwestern end of the Market Street subway connects to the much-older Twin Peaks Tunnel, and the northeastern end connects to surface tracks along the Embarcadero.

== History ==
=== Background ===
The Market Street Railway had existed on the surface, parallel to the later subway's alignment, in some form, since 1860, with services terminating at the Ferry Building. To alleviate traffic, plans for a subway under Market Street can be dated from 1912 if not earlier. By 1918, there were four tracks running down the thoroughfare – two per direction. That plan is similar to the subway built 60 years later, including two levels of train traffic and provisions for both overhead and third-rail power delivery, but not accounting for a trans-Bay tunnel.

The Twin Peaks Tunnel was built with the east end sloping downward, foreseeing future connection to a subway under Market Street.

Serious consideration for construction was finally given while designing the initial BART system. To earn the votes of San Francisco residents, the San Francisco Bay Area Rapid Transit District planned to build a two-level subway with BART trains on the lower level and Muni streetcars on the upper level. However, the entire subway would be owned by the District, and it designed Muni's level with features like very long platforms to allow it to be converted to use by BART trains. This was part of a subway design for the BART bond and was discarded in the end, yet construction had already begun, and the infrastructure was finished according to the original plan, resulting in a light-rail subway that is capable of accommodating rapid transit trains, a concept that is elsewhere known as premetro. However, the District would not purchase new vehicles compatible with the Muni part of the subway and did no planning on how to integrate the existing lines into the subway before making their pitch to voters.

=== Construction and operation ===
Construction, commencing in July 1967, was carried out via the cut-and-cover method. Embarcadero station was added later in the planning and construction process, though the basic structure of the station was built initially for the purpose of allowing later construction of the complete station.

BART trains first ran through the subway with service as far as Daly City on November 5, 1973. Connections through the Transbay Tube were opened for revenue service on September 16, 1974. Embarcadero station was opened about two years later on May 27, 1976. A press event with trial runs with the Boeing LRV 1221 through the Muni part of the subway was held in early 1978.

Starting on February 18, 1980 and continuing for over a year afterward, Muni replaced Market Street surface operations with subway service. At that point there were no plans to maintain the street-running tracks on Market Street, but that changed in the late 1980s after the success of several Historic Trolley Festivals. Muni's Embarcadero portal opened in 1998 and was not an original part of the subway's plan; this allowed connections to Caltrain's 4th and King station. Between its opening in 2007 and its move to the newly-constructed Central Subway in 2023, Muni ran the T Third Street line through the Market Street Subway as a Metro line merged with the K Ingleside. The Central Subway connects with the Market Street subway under Union Square, as an underground walkway connects the new Union Square/Market Street station with Powell Station.

== Services ==
Prior to March 30, 2020, the K Ingleside, L Taraval, M Ocean View, and T Third Street Muni Metro lines ran through the entire length of the subway to its direct connection with the Twin Peaks Tunnel. The J Church and N Judah lines left the subway via the Duboce portal at Church and Duboce streets, and only the N Judah and the T Third Street lines continued past the Embarcadero portal. Since the Muni Metro platforms at Montgomery Street, Powell Street, and Civic Center are long enough to hold two 75-foot (23 m) two-car trains simultaneously, the San Francisco Municipal Transportation Agency began double-berthing in April 2015. Under this process, two trains are in the station at once: the rear train discharges passengers while the front train boards passengers. The new practice was aimed at reducing passenger frustration, though it would not reduce travel times. In 1997, work began to install the SelTrac CBTC-based signalling system in the subway. The work was completed in 2001 and station-to-station operation is now completely automated under normal operation.

On March 30, 2020, Muni Metro service, including trains through the Market Street Subway, was replaced with buses due to the COVID-19 pandemic. Rail service returned on August 22, with the routes reconfigured to improve reliability in the subway. No J, K, or L service entered the subway: J Church service ran only on the surface between Balboa Park station and Church and Duboce station, while K Ingleside and L Taraval service was interlined, running between Wawona and 46th Avenue station and Balboa Park station. It returned to bus substitution three days later, citing malfunctioning overhead wire splices and the need to quarantine control center staff after a COVID-19 case.

Rail service resumed in stages between December 2020 and February 2022. The T Third Street began using the subway between Ferry Portal and Embarcadero on January 23, 2021; full N, KT, and S service resumed on May 15, followed by the M on August 14. J Church trains, which had resumed surface-only operation on December 19, 2020, returned to the subway on February 19, 2022. The L Taraval operated as a bus to allow for construction along Taraval Street until rail service resumed on September 28, 2024.

BART headways are short through this segment, as the right of way carries four of the system's five rapid transit lines on just two tracks.

After its completion in November 2022, the Central Subway is connected to the Market Street subway via a pedestrian underpass running from the existing Powell Street station to the under-construction Union Square/Market Street station a block away. The T was rerouted from the Market Street subway into the new Central Subway in January 2023, creating a one-seat ride from Chinatown to Visitacion Valley.

== Stations in the Market Street subway ==
There are a total of seven stations in the subway. Four are used by BART; all seven are used by the Muni Metro lines that had previously run on the surface of Market Street. The J Church and N Judah exit the subway at the Duboce portal and thus do not serve the Castro Street and Church Street (subway) stations; J trains stop at surface-level platforms on Church Street.

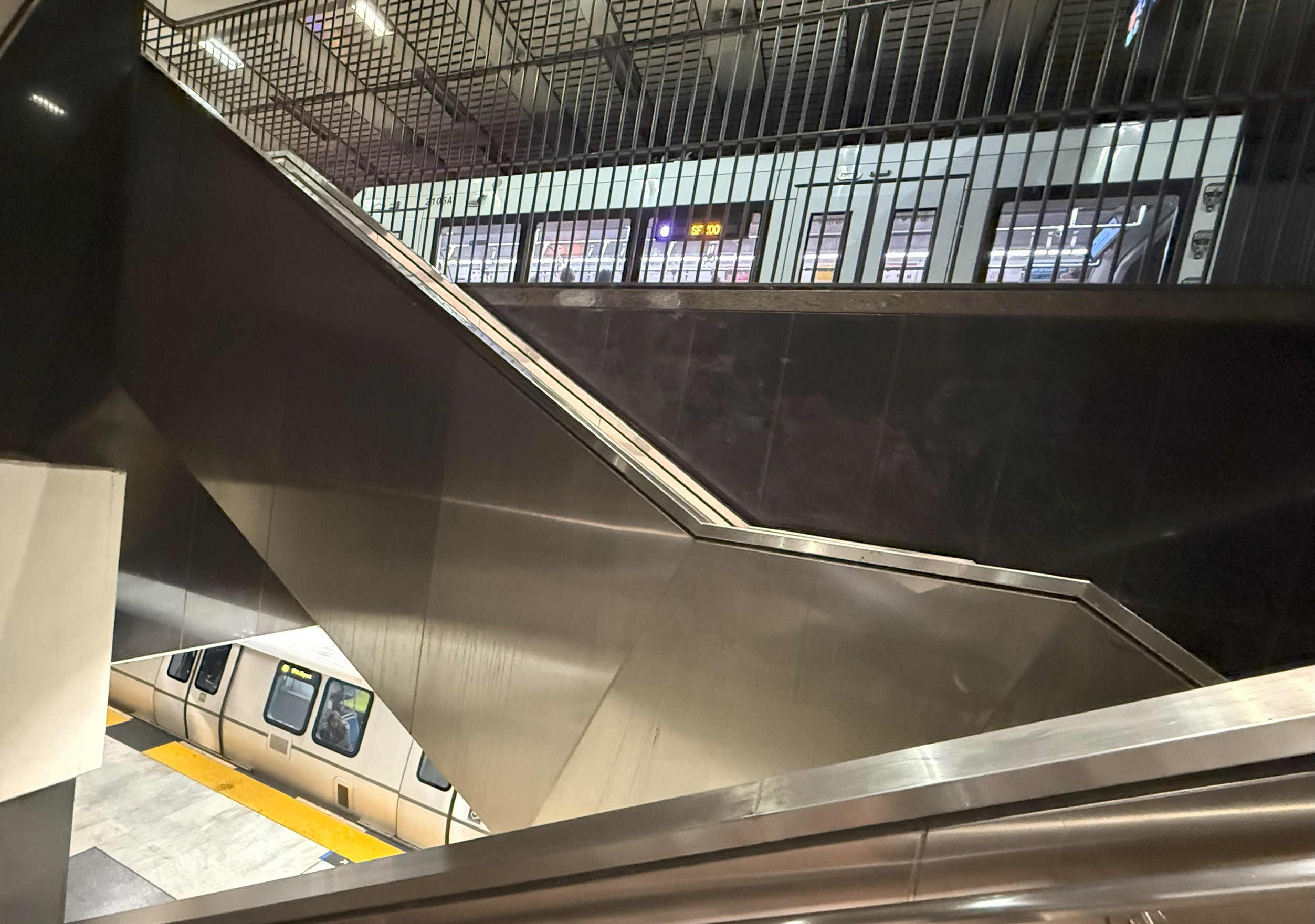
The four shared Muni/BART stations have Muni streetcars on the upper platform and BART trains on the lower platform with no direct connection between the two levels.

Stations are listed from northeast to southwest:

Station	Platform layout	Muni Metro	BART
Embarcadero	Island	J Church K Ingleside L Taraval M Ocean View N Judah S Shuttle	Blue Line (BART) Green Line (BART) Red Line (BART) Yellow Line (BART)
Montgomery	Island	J Church K Ingleside L Taraval M Ocean View N Judah S Shuttle	Blue Line (BART) Green Line (BART) Red Line (BART) Yellow Line (BART)
Powell	Island	J Church K Ingleside L Taraval M Ocean View N Judah S Shuttle	Blue Line (BART) Green Line (BART) Red Line (BART) Yellow Line (BART)
Civic Center	Island	J Church K Ingleside L Taraval M Ocean View N Judah S Shuttle	Blue Line (BART) Green Line (BART) Red Line (BART) Yellow Line (BART)
Van Ness	Island	J Church K Ingleside L Taraval M Ocean View N Judah S Shuttle	
Church	Side	K Ingleside L Taraval M Ocean View S Shuttle	
Castro	Side	K Ingleside L Taraval M Ocean View S Shuttle	
