= San Francisco Historic Trolley Festival =

Streetcar service in San Francisco (1983–1987)

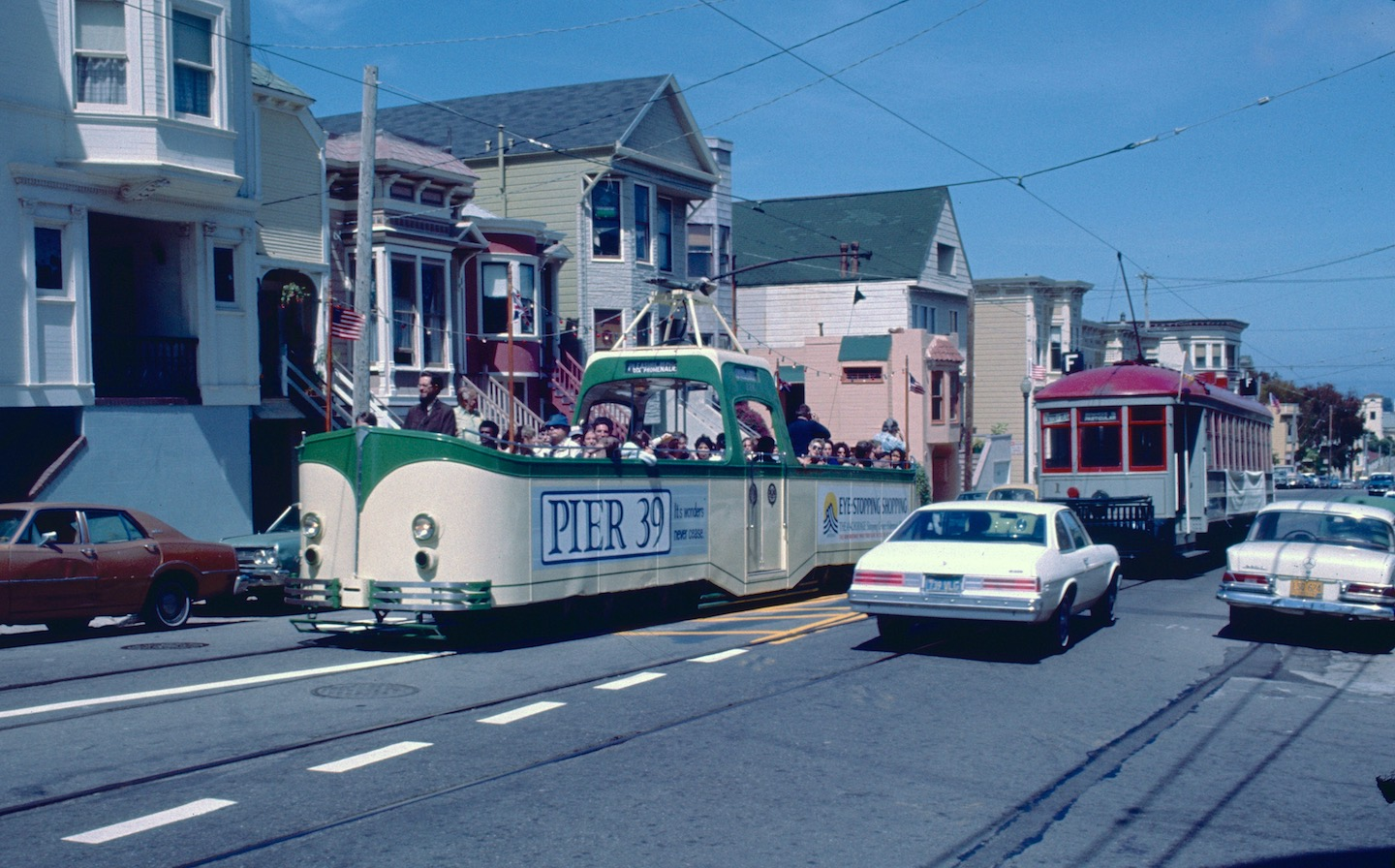
- Blackpool "boat" car 226 passing Muni car No. 1 on 17th Street in July 1983

Overview
- Service type: Heritage streetcar
- Locale: San Francisco, California, United States
- First service: June 23, 1983
- Last service: October 17, 1987
- Successor: F Market & Wharves streetcar line
- Former operator: San Francisco Municipal Railway (Muni)
- Ridership: 3,000+ (1986)
- Annual ridership: 300,000 (1984)

Route
- Termini: Transbay Terminal; 17th & Castro streets, Castro District

Technical
- Rolling stock: Approx. 6–10 streetcars
- Track gauge: 4 ft 8 1/2 in (1,435 mm) (standard gauge)
- Electrification: Overhead lines, 600 V DC

The San Francisco Historic Trolley Festival was a heritage streetcar service along Market Street in San Francisco, California, United States. It used a variety of vintage streetcars and operated five to seven days a week, primarily in summer months, between 1983 and 1987. Sponsored by the San Francisco Chamber of Commerce and operated by the San Francisco Municipal Railway, it was the predecessor of the F Market & Wharves heritage streetcar line that opened in 1995. It used historic streetcars from several different countries, as well as a number of preserved San Francisco cars. The impetus behind the Trolley Festival was that the city's famed cable car system, one of its biggest tourist attractions, was scheduled to be closed for more than a year and a half for renovation, starting in September 1982. The Trolley Festival was conceived as a temporary substitute tourist attraction during the cable car system's closure.

When its operation began, in the summer of 1983, the Historic Trolley Festival was expected to be a temporary service, operating only five days a week – Thursday through Monday – and not expected to continue beyond that summer's tourist season. However, its popularity was such that it was repeated in subsequent years, gradually expanded to additional months of the year, and even operated seven days a week in 1985. Each season, a few additional streetcars joined the festival fleet, adding variety and helping to maintain tourist interest. The five seasons of Historic Trolley Festival operation helped to establish strong public and business support for the proposed full-time F-line streetcar service (an all-day, daily, year-round service) that ultimately came to fruition in 1995.

== Overview ==
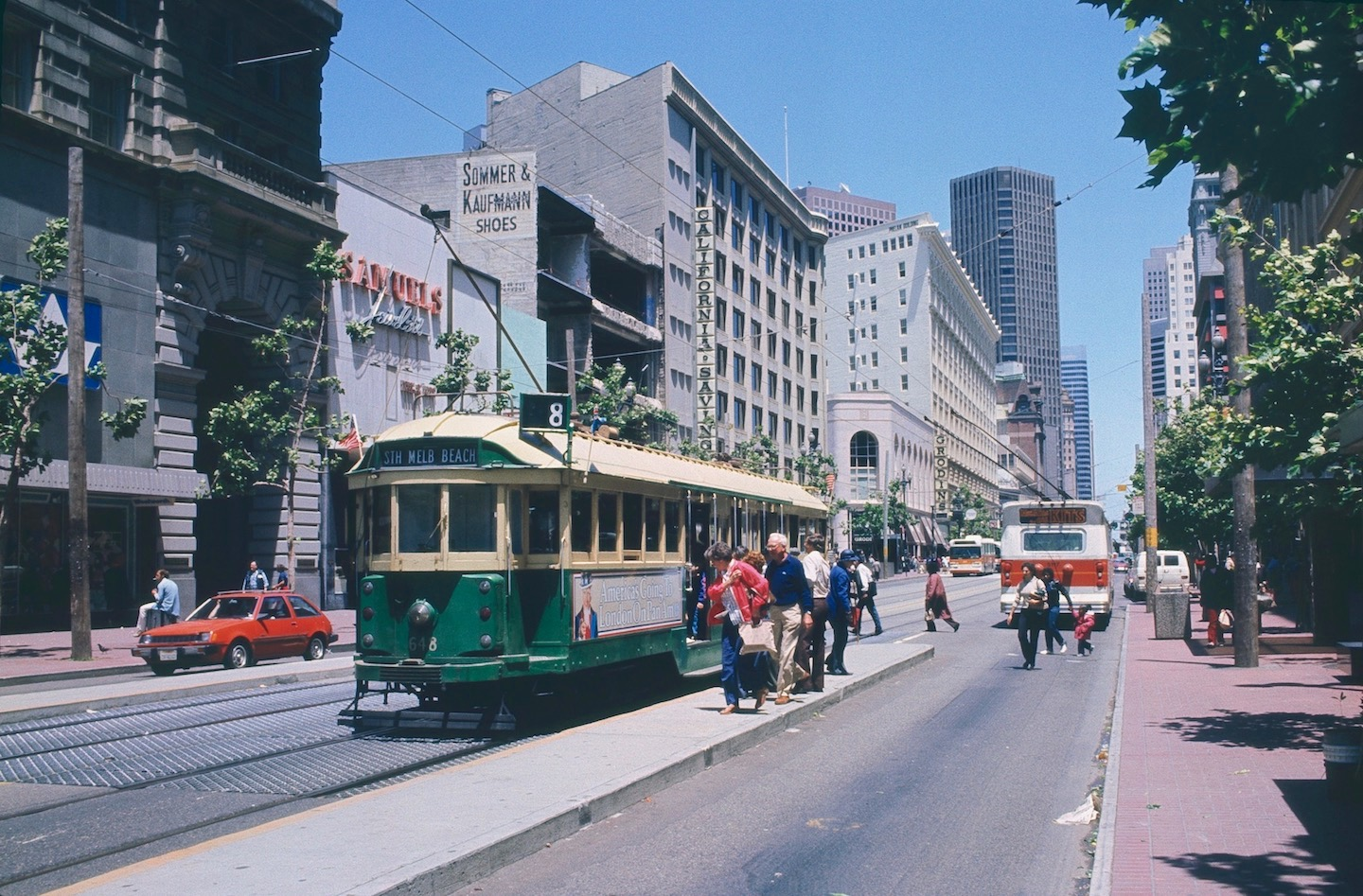
Melbourne tram 648 eastbound on Market Street between Powell and Stockton Streets during the first Trolley Festival

The San Francisco Historic Trolley Festival was a heritage streetcar service along Market Street in downtown San Francisco, California, that used a variety of vintage streetcars and operated five to seven days a week, primarily in the summer months, between 1983 and 1987. Operated by the San Francisco Municipal Railway (Muni), the city's primary transit agency, and co-sponsored by the city's Chamber of Commerce and various corporate and private donors, it was the predecessor of the F Market & Wharves streetcar line that opened in 1995. It used historic streetcars/trolleys – these two terms are synonyms in most parts of the United States – from several different countries, as well as a number of preserved San Francisco streetcars, many of which were borrowed from museums. The impetus behind the Trolley Festival was that the city's famous cable car system, one of its biggest tourist attractions, was due to be closed for 20 months (this ended up stretching to 21 months) starting in September 1982 for a needed rebuilding of its aging infrastructure. Local business owners and city officials were very concerned that the temporary absence of the cable cars would lead to a sharp decline in tourism, especially during the one summer season included in the 20-month period.

The first Historic Trolley Festival took place in summer 1983, operating five days a week, and was so well-received that a second festival was organized for the summer of 1984, even though the cable cars would be back in service by then. Additional vintage trolleys were borrowed or acquired, from other cities and foreign countries, to add variety. The service's popularity remained so strong that it was repeated every year until 1987, and during its five seasons it gradually expanded to additional months of the year, additional days of the week – even operating seven days a week in 1985 – and with improved frequency. In addition to streetcars from San Francisco and other U.S. cities, the service featured streetcars from cities in Australia, England, Germany, Italy, Japan, Mexico, and Russia.

An estimated 300,000 passengers were carried the festival's second season, in 1984, and "considerably more" the following year. By 1987, the trolley fleet had grown to 10 cars.

During the first four seasons, Muni spent around $526,000 per year to operate the Trolley Festival, but the private sector funded the costs of acquiring and restoring the vintage trolleys, with corporate gifts and public fundraising. A small portion of Muni's costs were recovered from fare revenue. Although the Trolley Festival was originally conceived as a temporary substitute tourist attraction during the cable car system's closure for renovation, by 1987 it had become "a star in its own right", able to "[stand] on its own as a tourist attraction".

== Origin and development ==
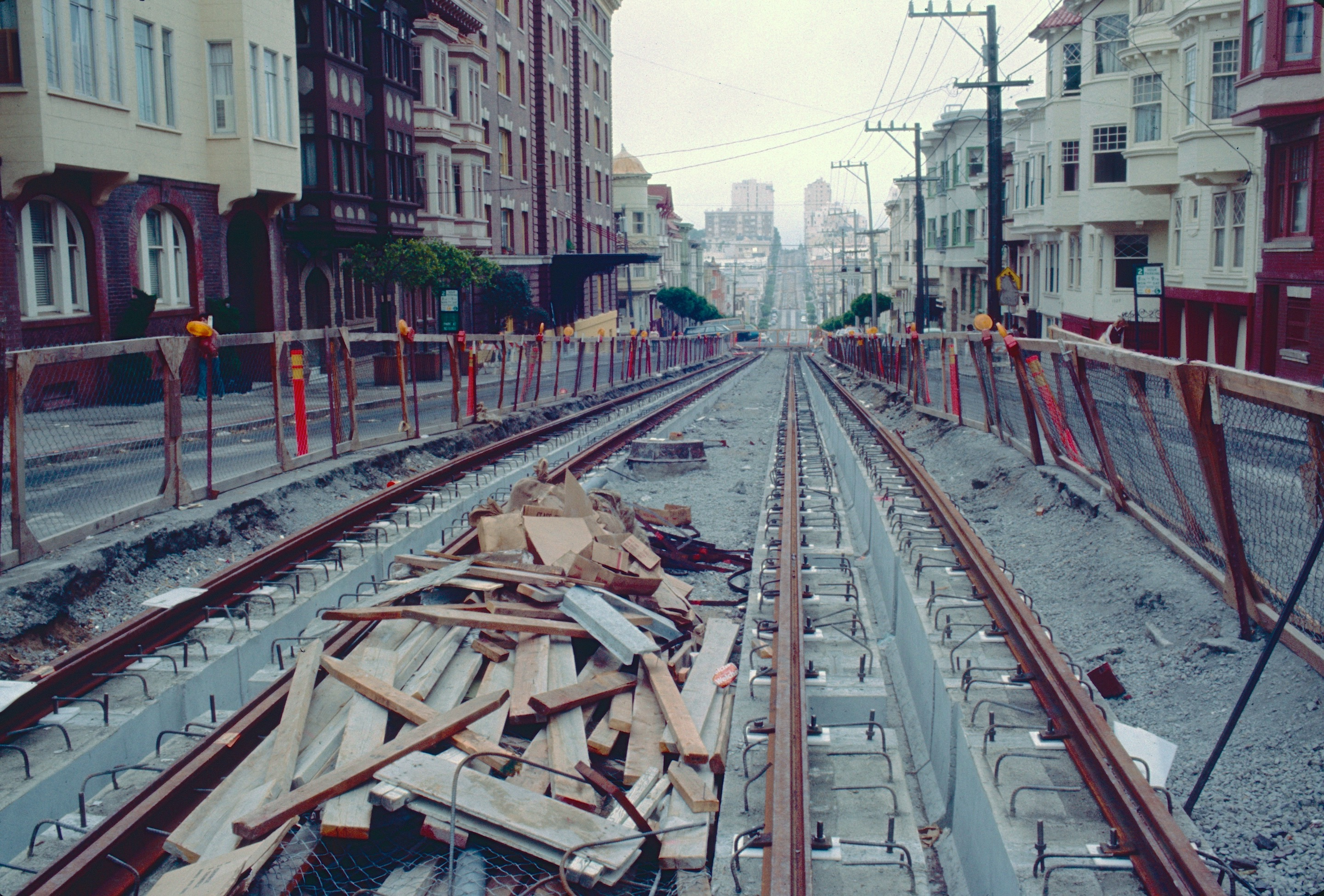
Shown under way in 1983 (here on Hyde Street), the planned closure of the city's cable car system for reconstruction was a key factor behind the 1982 idea to organize a trolley festival for the following summer.

The idea for what came to be called the San Francisco Historic Trolley Festival was born in summer 1982, when regular use of the streetcar tracks on the surface of Market Street–the city's main street–was about to end and a 20-month closure of the cable car system for rebuilding was about to begin.

Although there had been proposals for a historic-streetcar service along the Embarcadero as early as 1974 and in 1981 Muni planners had also formally proposed the eventual implementation of such a service along Market Street, the idea only really began to attract strong support from the business community and city officials in 1982, as the nearly two-year suspension of all cable car service loomed. The famed cable car system, a National Historic Landmark and one of the city's biggest tourist attractions, was determined in 1979 to be in need of extensive repairs. A thorough rebuilding of the entire system was scheduled to begin in September 1982 and last 20 months, with service on all three lines suspended for the duration; it ultimately lasted 21 months (until June 1984). San Francisco business owners and others who benefited from tourism were very concerned that the temporary closure would lead to a steep drop in the number of visitors to the city. A historic trolley "festival", using a variety of vintage trolleys from around the U.S. and the world, was proposed as a substitute tourist attraction during the cable car suspension, especially during the one summer season that would be included in the 21-month suspension, summer 1983.

A phasing-out of the use of the tracks along the surface of Market Street had begun in February 1980, when weekday service on the N Judah line was converted from the old PCC streetcars to new trains of Boeing LRVs (light rail vehicles) and moved into the newly opened upper level of the Market Street subway as the first stage of an upgrading and rebranding of the city's remaining streetcar lines as the Muni Metro. Weekday service on the four other then-surviving Muni streetcar lines (J, K, L and M) was gradually also converted to the modern, longer trains and moved off of the surface of Market. By June 1981, all weekday service on the five lines had been moved into the subway, and only on weekends – when the subway was closed – were the tracks on Market Street still in use, with PCC cars still providing the service on weekends. However, the final conversions were scheduled for fall 1982. Weekend service on J-K-L-M-N would be converted from PCC cars to light-rail vehicles and all use of the Market Street tracks would end, the last day of the old arrangement being set for September 19, 1982.

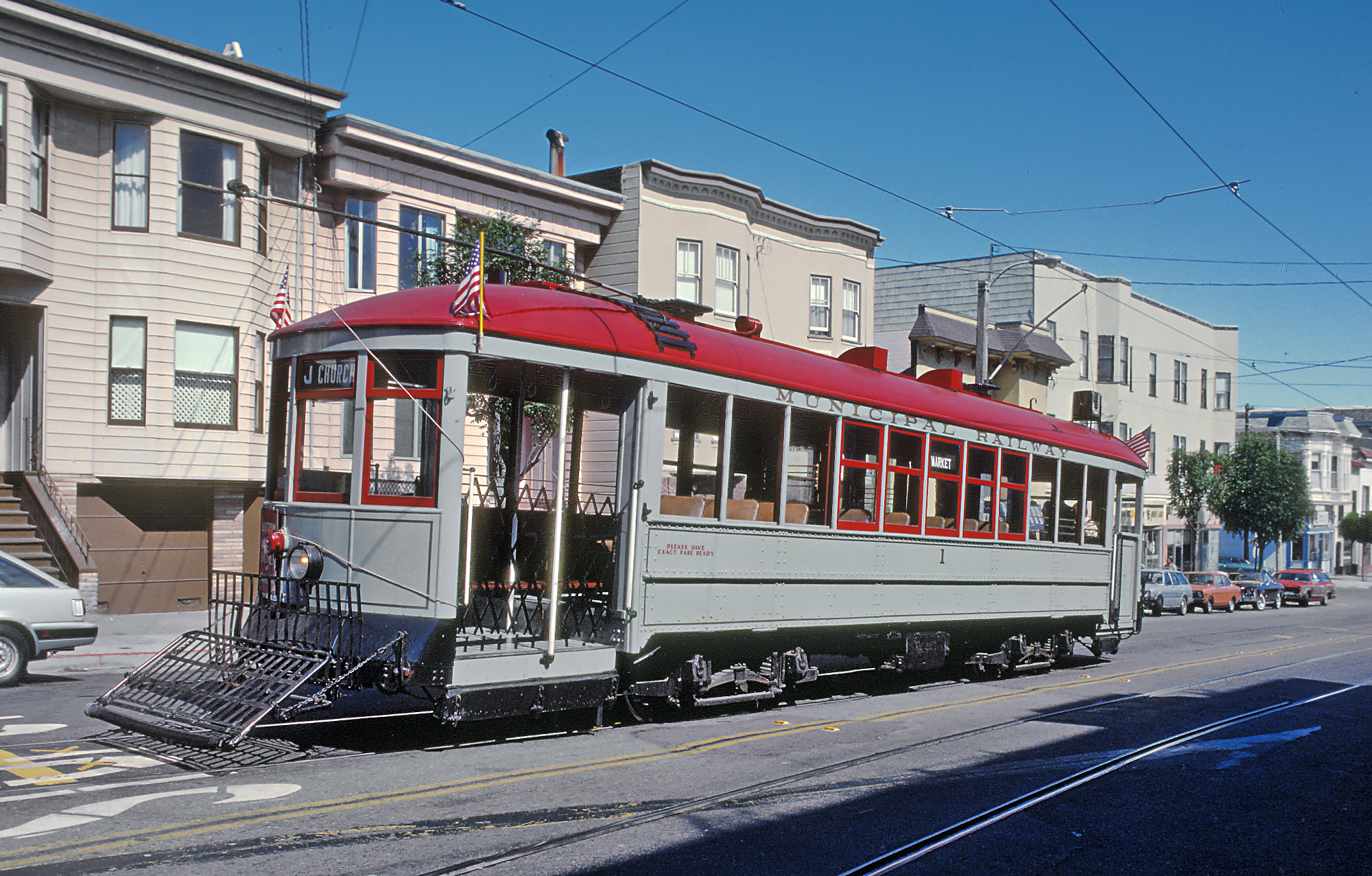
Muni car No. 1 in service on the J Church line in 1982

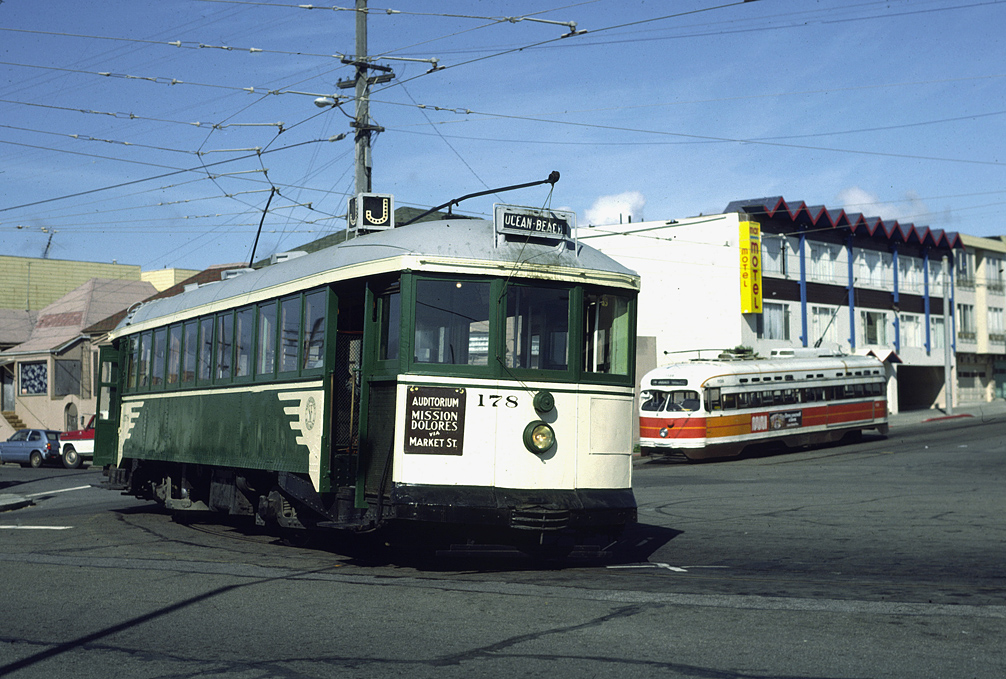
Car 178 at the outer end of the N-line in 1982

In 1981, one of Muni's own preserved vintage trolleys, 1912-built car No. 1, had been operated in fare-free shuttle service along Market Street from the Transbay Terminal to the track wye at 11th & Market on alternate Saturdays beginning April 18. In September 1981, former Muni car 178 (K-type, built in 1923) was brought to the city on loan from the California Railway Museum (renamed the Western Railway Museum at the beginning of 1985) for operation on railfan trips in conjunction with the 1981 convention of the Association of Railway Museums. Its loan to Muni was extended, and on some Saturdays in fall 1981 car 1 or 178 ran in service on the J-line. The operation of the vintage streetcars was well received by the public. In summer 1982, both cars were operated in regular J-line service almost every weekend and holiday from July 4 until the closure of the Market Street tracks on September 19.

The popularity of the limited 1981 and 1982 use of historic trolleys in service demonstrated that such operation had the potential to attract tourists and led to the realization that a full-scale service with vintage trolleys might be feasible. The city's Board of Supervisors and San Francisco Public Utilities Commission both passed resolutions in August 1982 endorsing the continuation of vintage streetcar service in some form. Car 178's lease ended, and it was returned to the California Railway Museum (Rio Vista) in fall 1982, but Muni still had its 1912 car 1 along with a few other cars that could be used.

== Organizing the event ==
Starting in the summer of 1982 the idea of organizing a historic trolley "festival" to take place during the 1983 tourist season was developed jointly by Muni and the San Francisco Chamber of Commerce, with help from others such as businessman and trolley fan Maurice Klebolt, who had helped to arrange the earlier operation of historic streetcars 1 and 178. With growing consensus that a 1983 Historic Trolley Festival could alleviate the anticipated loss of tourism revenue caused by the cable car system's shut down, the Chamber of Commerce became the festival proposal's sponsor. The San Francisco Convention and Visitors Bureau was on board, and the city government also supported the idea. There was some resistance within Muni, where many in the administration were opposed to any return of streetcar operation to streets in the city center, but this was overcome by strong support of the idea from Muni's recently hired new general manager, Harold Geissenheimer, and from then-mayor Dianne Feinstein and others at city hall.

Rick Laubscher, who then chaired the Chamber's transportation committee, organized the event in collaboration with Mayor Feinstein. A roster of vintage streetcars still needed to be assembled and a route chosen. For the vehicles, Muni's car 1 would be joined by Muni car 130 (built in 1930 by Jewett Car Company), which was nearing completion of a restoration from its last configuration as work car 0131, and car 178 would be borrowed again from the California Railway Museum (Western Railway Museum). Several railway and streetcar museums across the country were contacted and asked whether they would loan a streetcar for the event. Most declined, but the Oregon Electric Railway Museum agreed to loan its Portland car 503 (a 1903 Brill), and the Western Railway Museum would loan Blackpool, England, "boat tram" 226 in addition to its San Francisco car 178. The Oregon museum's Paul Class, who had become well known to streetcar fans through his streetcar importing business, Gales Creek Enterprises, arranged the lease to San Francisco of two single-truck streetcars from Porto, Portugal, Nos. 122 and 189. Maurice Klebolt arranged for a W2-class streetcar to be brought from Melbourne, Australia. The planned fleet was becoming increasingly international, a development enthusiastically supported by Klebolt, who had acquired a 1954 streetcar from Hamburg, Germany, in 1979 and donated it to the city of San Francisco in hopes that it would one day operate on the city's transit system. (Trolley Festivals in subsequent years saw the addition of trolleys from Japan, Italy, Mexico and Russia.)

It was decided that service would operate five days a week, Thursday through Monday, with a target start-up date of around Memorial Day. The route would be from the Transbay Terminal along Market Street, Duboce Avenue and Church and 17th Streets to Castro Street. (At that time, there were no tracks on Market Street between Duboce Avenue and Castro Street, having been removed during Muni Metro subway construction in 1973, but tracks were relaid on upper Market Street in 1993–94.) There was no facility for turning streetcars around at 17th & Castro, so a new crossover would be installed on 17th. However, only double-ended (bidirectional) streetcars can turn around using a crossover, so the regular Trolley Festival route would be restricted to vehicles with that configuration. It was later decided to add some of Muni's single-ended (unidirectional) PCC cars to the 1983 Festival fleet, to ensure that there were enough cars, and because these could not change directions at 17th & Castro they would operate on the J Church line, serving the full length of that route, or only as far as the track wye on 11th Street at Market. Fares would be the same as regular Muni service.

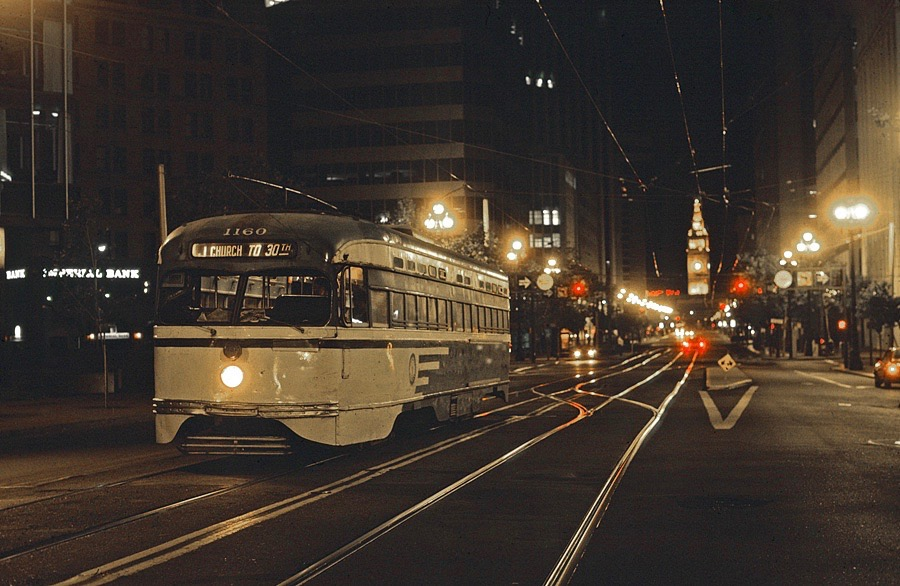
A PCC car on Market Street on September 19, 1982, which at the time was to be the final day of streetcar service on the surface of Market Street for the foreseeable future

Meanwhile, regular streetcar service on the surface of Market Street ended as planned on the night of September 19, 1982 (early hours of September 20). Less than three days later, the cable car system shut down for the start of its nearly two-year rebuilding. Weekend service on the five streetcar lines was temporarily operated by buses until November 20, when the Market Street subway stations of the Metro finally became served seven days a week.

Laubscher presented the still-developing Trolley Festival plan to City Hall and affected neighborhood organizations in the fall of 1982 and gradually won their full support. His employer, the engineering and construction company Bechtel Corporation, had also agreed to help sponsor the event, and the Bay Area Electric Railroad Association pledged to help with training and maintenance of the historic trolleys. Laubscher is credited with naming the event the "San Francisco Historic Trolley Festival".

== Approval and final preparations ==
The San Francisco Board of Supervisors provided the final needed approval on February 28, 1983, appropriating nearly $350,000 for the service. Additional funding came from sponsorships of individual streetcars. For example, Portland car 503 was sponsored by Embarcadero Center, Blackpool "boat" car 226 by the Ghirardelli Chocolate Company, San Francisco car 178 by San Francisco-based Levi Strauss & Company, and Muni PCC car 1128, which Geissenheimer had directed to be repainted and renumbered to its former identity as St. Louis Public Service Company No. 1704 for the festival, was sponsored by St. Louis-based Anheuser-Busch.

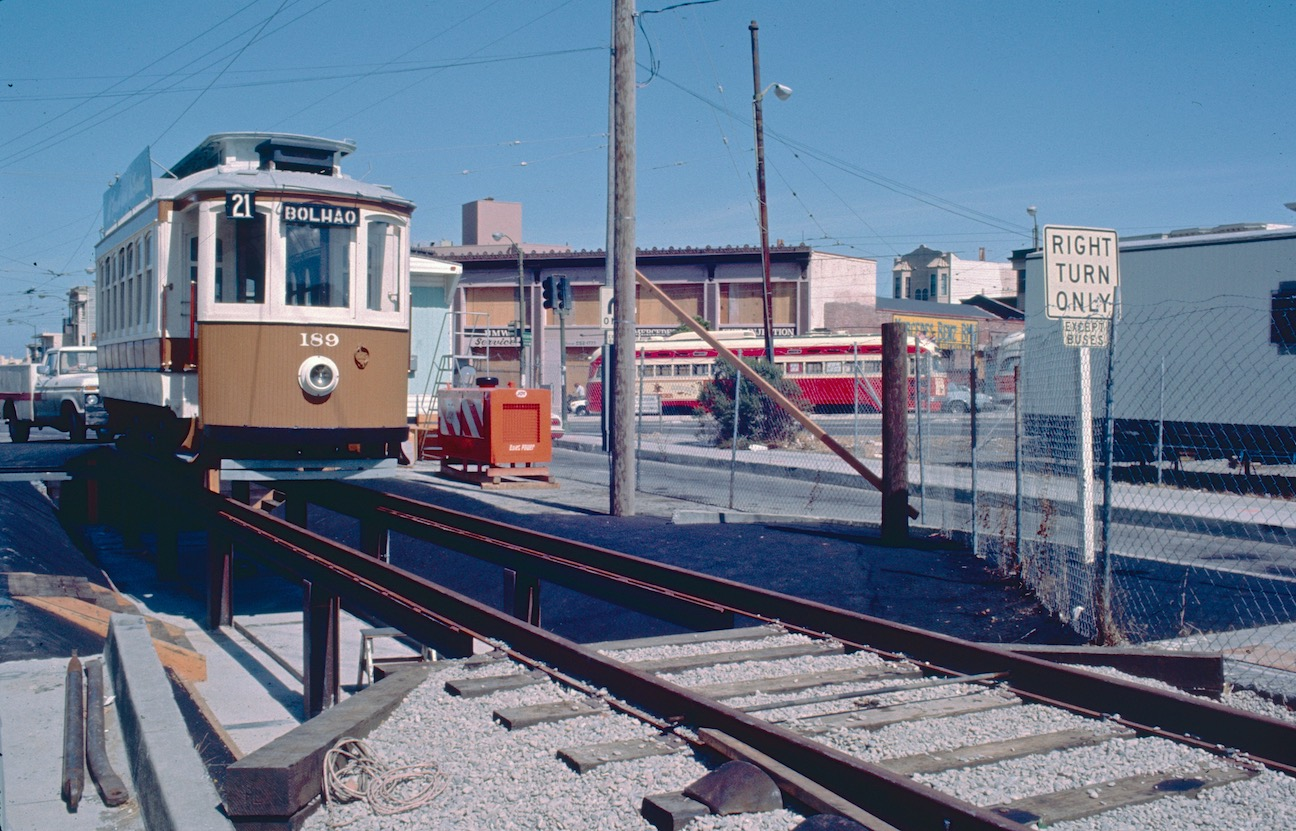
Porto car 189 over the inspection pit at the new storage yard set up on Duboce Avenue

Another entity that assisted with organization and promotion of the first Historic Trolley Festival was the non-profit Market Street Railway, whose board of directors included Klebolt and Laubscher. MSR took on a much larger role years later, after the Trolley Festivals ended in 1987, when it became one of the most influential proponents of establishing a permanent, year-round service of vintage streetcars on Market Street – a plan that came to fruition in 1995 as the F-Market (later F Market & Wharves) line.

A storage and maintenance area for the fleet was set up in the private right-of-way next to Duboce Avenue and the subway portal for the J and N lines just west of Market Street, and an additional track with an inspection pit was installed. The right-of-way's two through tracks had been out of use since the end of regular streetcar service on the surface of Market Street in September 1982. On festival operating days, streetcars in both directions would use the same track – i.e. bidirectional single-track operation, with signals preventing streetcars traveling in opposite directions from meeting – leaving the other track available for storage of cars not in service. The target start-up date of Memorial Day or early June slipped to late June.

== First season ==
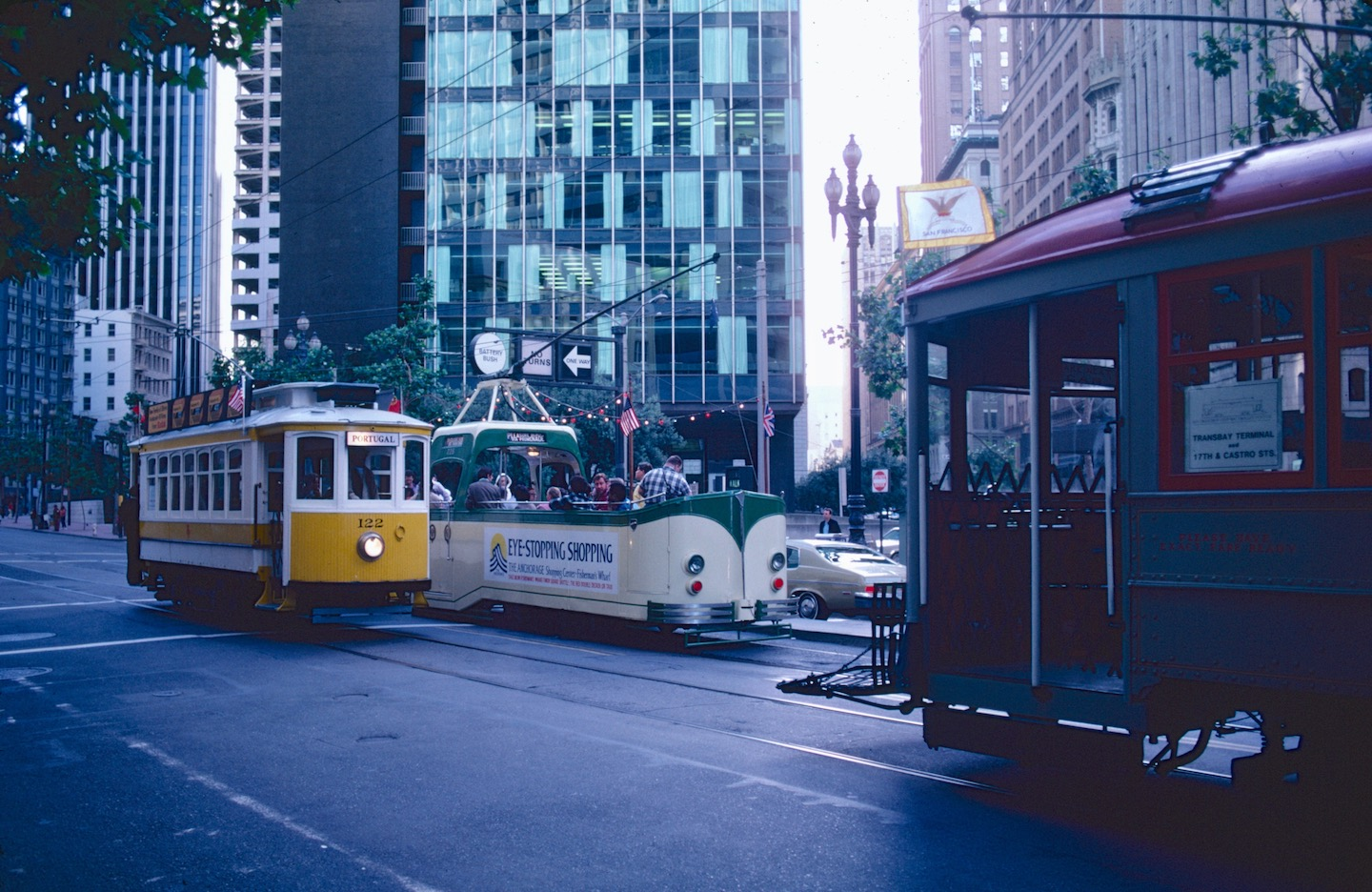
Porto 122, Blackpool "boat" 226 and Muni car 1 during a July 2 restaging of the 1983 Opening Day parade

The inaugural San Francisco Historic Trolley Festival was launched on Thursday, June 23, 1983, with a parade of vintage trolleys along Market Street. Leading the procession was Muni's car 1, with Mayor Dianne Feinstein at the controls. Other streetcars in the opening-day parade included Porto 122, Blackpool 226, San Francisco 178, and Melbourne 648. Non-passenger or non-vintage rail cars that joined them in the parade included Muni Repair Car 1008 (a PCC-type former passenger car), "Line Car" (overhead wire maintenance car) 0304, and Boeing LRV 1213.

Public service began on June 24 and continued until September 19, operating five days a week, daily except Tuesdays and Wednesdays, on a scheduled headway of 15 minutes, requiring six cars. It ran from 11 a.m. to 7 p.m. on weekends and 9 a.m. to 5 p.m. on the weekends with service. Muni's regular fares applied, which meant a 60-cent fare for most riders.

The festival's route from the Transbay Terminal to 17th & Castro was about 3.5 miles (5.6 km) long each way. Most cars displayed only destinations and route numbers from their cities of origin during the 1983 season, but officially the route was designated as F Market & Wharves from the start. Although even the 1995-opened full-service F Market & Wharves line did not reach Fisherman's Wharf until 2000, a proposed future Market Street service had been given that designation in Muni's five-year plan of 1981–1986. The previous F-line, which closed in 1951, had been F–Stockton and did not run on Market Street. In the late 1970s, Muni planners had chosen "E" for the proposed Embarcadero vintage-streetcar line, and using "F" for a possible Market Street line seemed logical, and was a letter not in use. (M was in use for the M Ocean View line.) The "F" designation for the festival route did not appear on Muni maps and schedules until 1985.

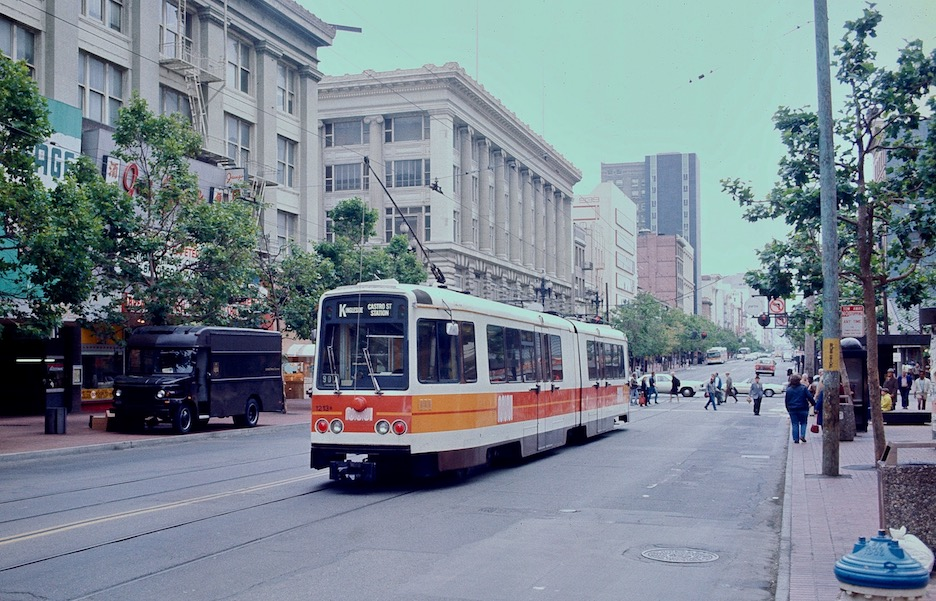
Boeing LRV 1213 westbound on Market Street at 5th Street, during the first month of the 1983 Trolley Festival

Other trolleys that were scheduled to run in the festival were late arriving, or not yet ready for service by opening day. These included Porto 189, which arrived in late June; Milwaukee 978 and Portland 503, which arrived in the first half of July; and Muni 130, whose restoration was not yet complete. To augment the Festival fleet until these cars were ready, LRV No. 1213, a modern vehicle only six years old, was temporarily added to the fleet. The only "historic" aspect to car 1213 was that it had been one of the two prototype Boeing light rail cars built for San Francisco, in 1977, originally numbered 1221 – the prototypes of a model that would ultimately comprise 130 cars in Muni's fleet. It and car 1220 (which later became 1212) were originally fitted with trolley poles for testing, but the test runs had never included Market Street, and the trolley poles were removed and replaced with pantographs before the cars entered regular service. For the Trolley Festival, trolley poles were reinstalled on car 1213, and it ran on the surface of Market Street for the first time.

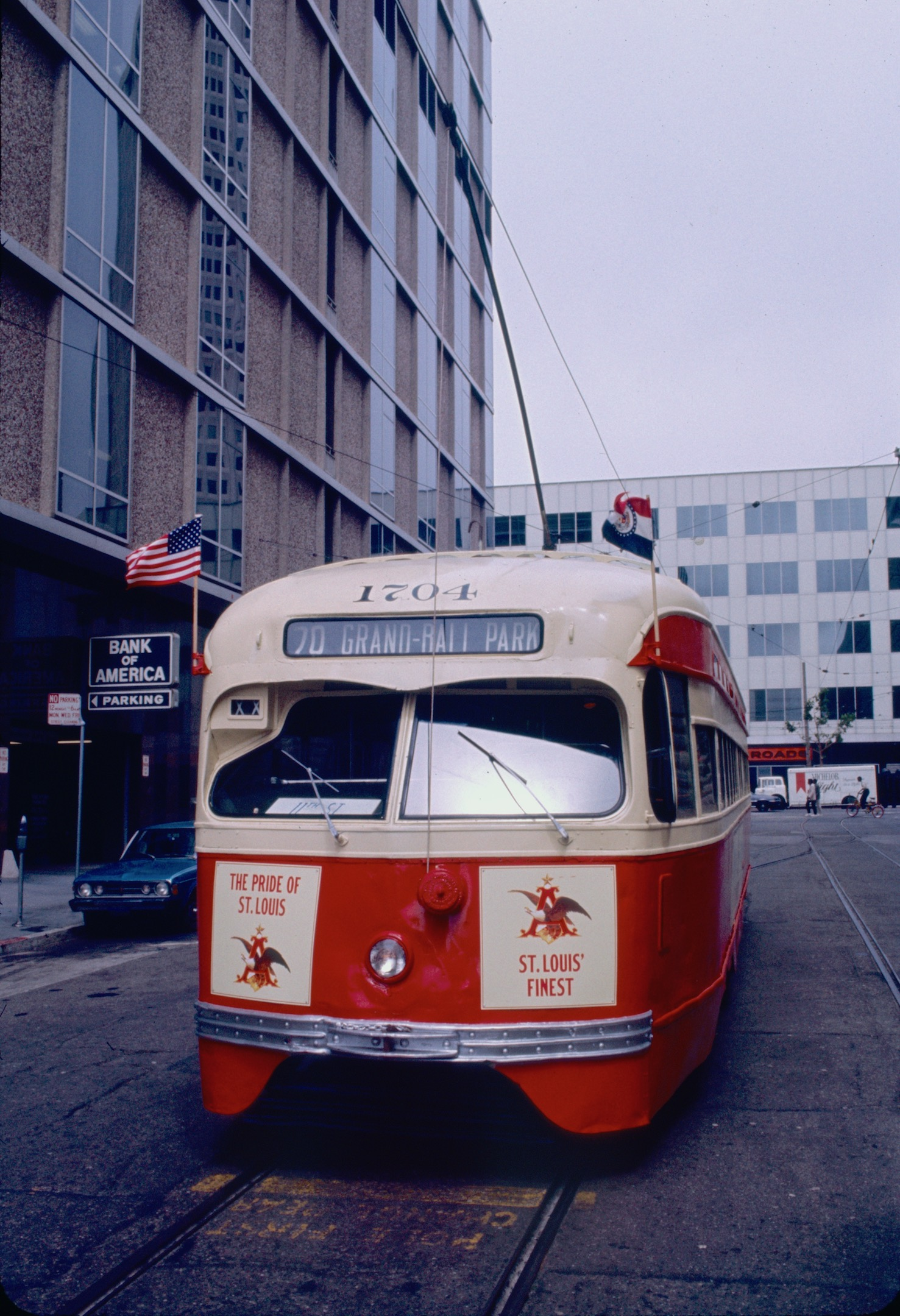
Muni PCC streetcar 1128, repainted as St. Louis 1704, in the track "wye" on 11th Street just south of Market

The 1934-built Blackpool car was a type that, in its home city, had gained the nickname "boat" tram, as its low-riding, open-top form was evocative of a boat "sailing" along the street.

Porto 189 and Portland 503 entered service in July, and Muni 130 did so in early August. Milwaukee car 978 was sent on loan from the East Troy Railroad Museum, in Wisconsin, and was fully operable. Unfortunately, the car's underframe incurred serious damage during shipment to San Francisco. It never entered service and was returned to Wisconsin in October 1983. The Portland car had originally run on narrow-gauge trucks, but these were replaced with standard-gauge trucks from a Melbourne streetcar in 1976 so that the car would eventually be able to operate at the Oregon Electric Railway Museum.

Also joining the Festival fleet soon after the parade were PCC cars 1704, the 1946-built Muni 1128 repainted as St. Louis 1704, and Muni 1040, built in 1952 and the last PCC-type streetcar built in North America. Because these cars were single-ended and unable to turn around on the crossover at 17th & Castro streets, when in service they operated either on the J-line or only as far as 11th & Market, where they could reverse direction on an existing wye there.

San Francisco Muni trolleybus 776, a 1950 Marmon-Herrington product, was occasionally operated as part of Trolley Festival events in 1983 and subsequent years, often running in the opening-day and closing-day parades, but usually not in service.

1983 Historic Trolley Festival fleet
City of origin	Car no.	Manufacturer	Year built	Type	Notes	Ref.
San Francisco	1	Holman	1912	DE, DT	Muni Type A, the first publicly owned big-city streetcar in the U.S.	
Porto, Portugal	122	J. G. Brill Company	1909	DE, ST	Wooden-bodied car	
San Francisco	130	Jewett	1914	DE, DT	Muni Type B, nicknamed "Iron Monsters"	
San Francisco	178	Bethlehem Shipbuilding Corporation (in former Union Iron Works plant)	1923	DE, DT	Muni Type K, also nicknamed "Iron Monsters"	
Porto, Portugal	189	Companhia Carris de Ferro do Porto (CCFP)	1929	DE, ST	Wooden-bodied car. Built in Portugal, but based on American-built Brill designs of circa 1912	
Blackpool, England	226	English Electric (Preston works)	1934	DE, DT	Open-top tram, type nicknamed "boat cars". Numbered 601 when retired in Blackpool	
Portland, Oregon	503	J. G. Brill Company	1903	DE, DT	Wooden-bodied car. Also known as a "Council Crest" car, for the Portland route on which this type was normally operated	
Melbourne, Australia	648	Melbourne & Metropolitan Tramways Board	1930	DE, DT	Wooden-bodied car. Melbourne W2-class	
San Francisco	1040	St. Louis Car Company	1952	SE, DT	PCC streetcar; last one built in North America	
San Francisco	1213	Boeing-Vertol	1977	DE, articulated US Standard Light Rail Vehicle	One of two prototype LRVs built for Muni; originally numbered 1221	
St. Louis, Missouri	1704	St. Louis Car Company	1946	SE, DT	PCC streetcar, formerly known as San Francisco Muni 1128 and still owned by Muni, but originally operated on the St. Louis streetcar system	
Hamburg, Germany	3557	Linke-Hofmann-Busch	1954	SE, DT	Nicknamed the "Red Baron" in San Francisco	
Abbreviations for general types: DE: double-ended; SE: single-ended; DT: double-truck; ST: single-truck.

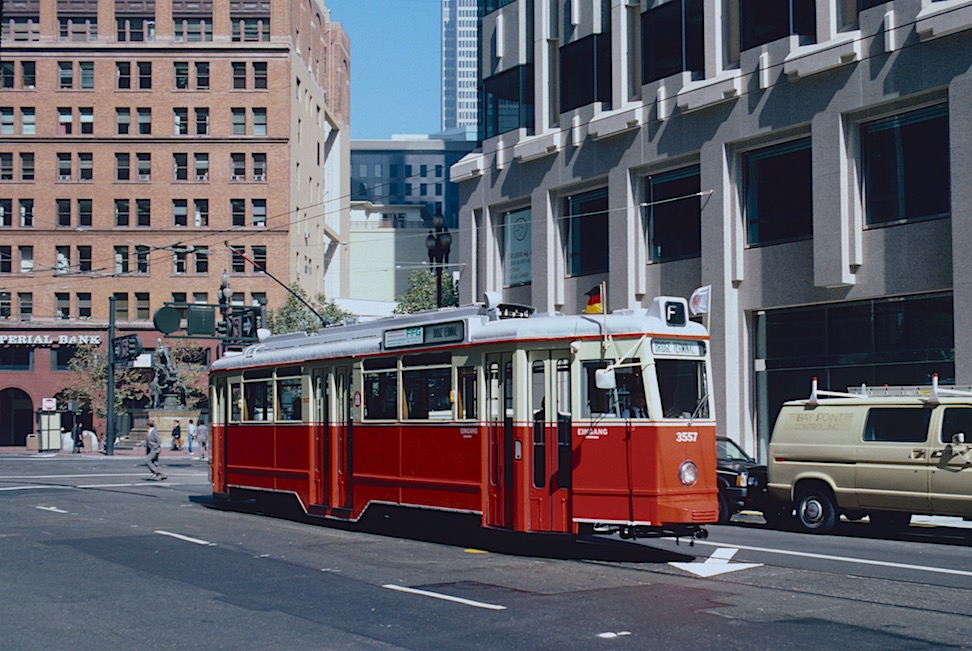
Hamburg car 3557 in service on First Street just south of Market Street

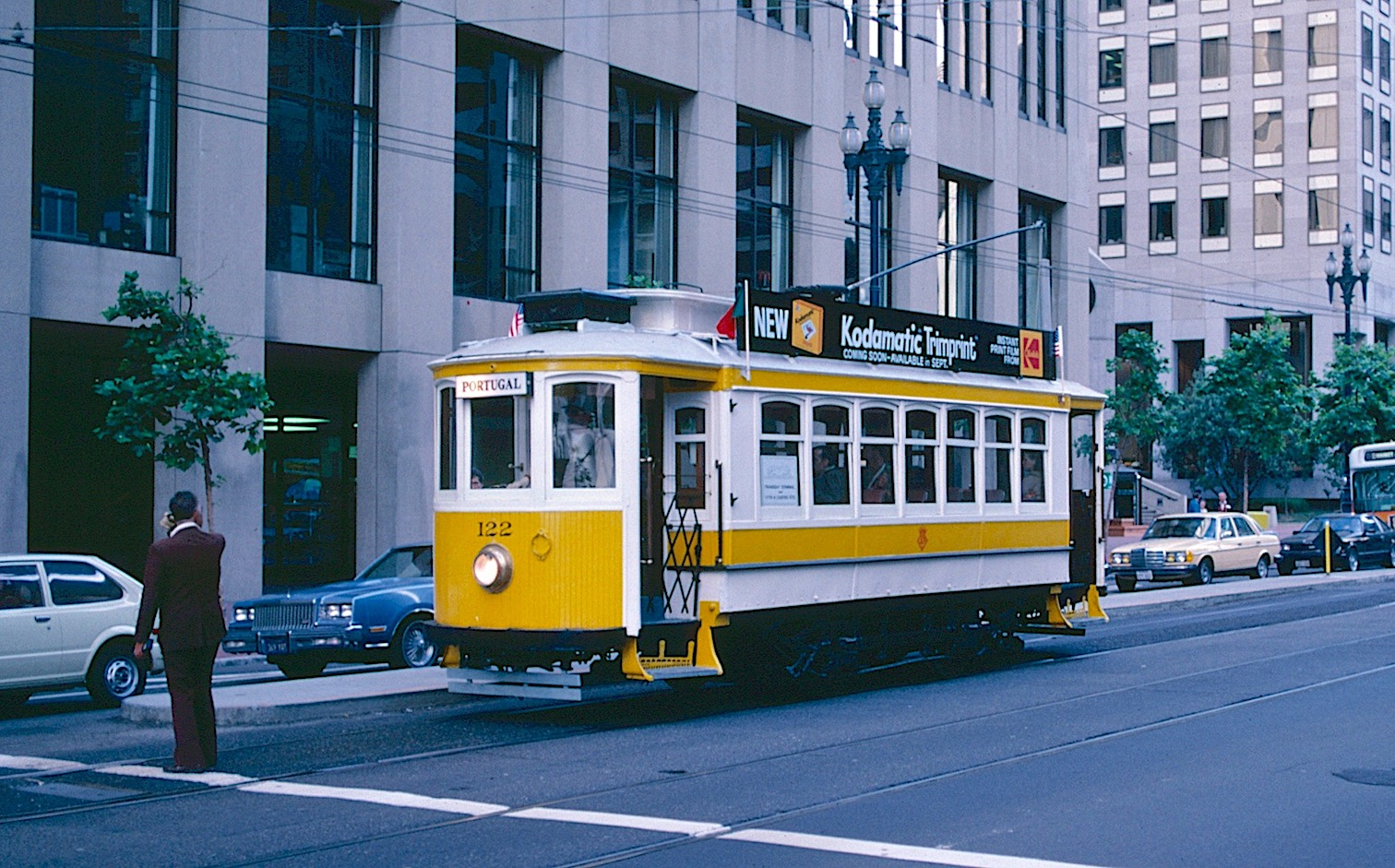
Porto car 122, a 1909 Brill trolley, participated in only one Trolley Festival and was then sold by its owners to a Dallas group. However, similar car 189 ran in all five festivals.

Hamburg 3557, the car that Maurice Klebolt had donated to the city in 1979, had not been on the official list of cars expected to be used in 1983, and had been in storage at Pier 70 with many withdrawn PCC cars. However, over the course of the summer, it was moved to Muni's Metro Center maintenance facility and work to prepare it for use was begun. It entered service on September 17, only two days before the final scheduled day of Trolley Festival service.

=== 1983 post-season ===
On September 26, one week after the end of the full-scale, five-days-a-week service, another parade of trolleys was held to mark the conclusion of the Historic Trolley Festival. However, the service's popularity led Muni to decide to extend it beyond September, albeit reduced to Saturdays and Sundays only, between 11 a.m. and 6 p.m., at least until the weather turned poor. These "mini-festivals" ultimately continued through the Christmas season and into January, but were reduced from six cars to four as the weather grew colder, worked from a fleet comprising cars 1, 130, 226, 648, 1040, 1704, and 3557. By December, service was typically two single-ended PCC cars running on the J-line on Saturdays and two older double-ended cars running to 17th & Castro on Sundays.

Some streetcars departed San Francisco after the 1983 regular season ended. Portland 503 returned to Oregon. (It would return to San Francisco in 1985.) Porto 122 also returned to Oregon; its owners, Bill and Sam Naito's Norcrest China Company, sold the car to the McKinney Avenue Transit Authority, a non-profit group working to establish a heritage streetcar line in Dallas, Texas, and No. 122 was moved to Dallas (where it entered service when that line opened in 1989). However, Muni purchased Porto 189 from Gales Creek Enterprises while the Festival was still under way, making it a permanent part of the fleet, and the loans of San Francisco 178 and Blackpool 226 by the Western Railway Museum were extended.

LRV 1213, the "least-popular" car of the fleet, operated again for the first week of the 1984 festival, in mid-June, but then was deemed to be needed to fill a shortage of cars for Muni Metro service, so its trolley poles were removed and it returned to service on the Muni Metro lines.

=== Reception in first year ===
The first Historic Trolley Festival proved to be an "overwhelming success". Ridership routinely was heavy on all cars except LRV 1213. Such was the popularity of the service that there was general agreement that what had been envisaged as a one-time, one-season event should be repeated in 1984, and planning got under way. The Chamber of Commerce agreed to help fund a second season. There were some who argued that holding another Trolley Festival in 1984 was unwarranted, given that the cable cars would be returning, but the balance of sentiment among the interested entities favored a repeat of the Trolley Festival in 1984, and it was to begin in June.

== 1984 season ==
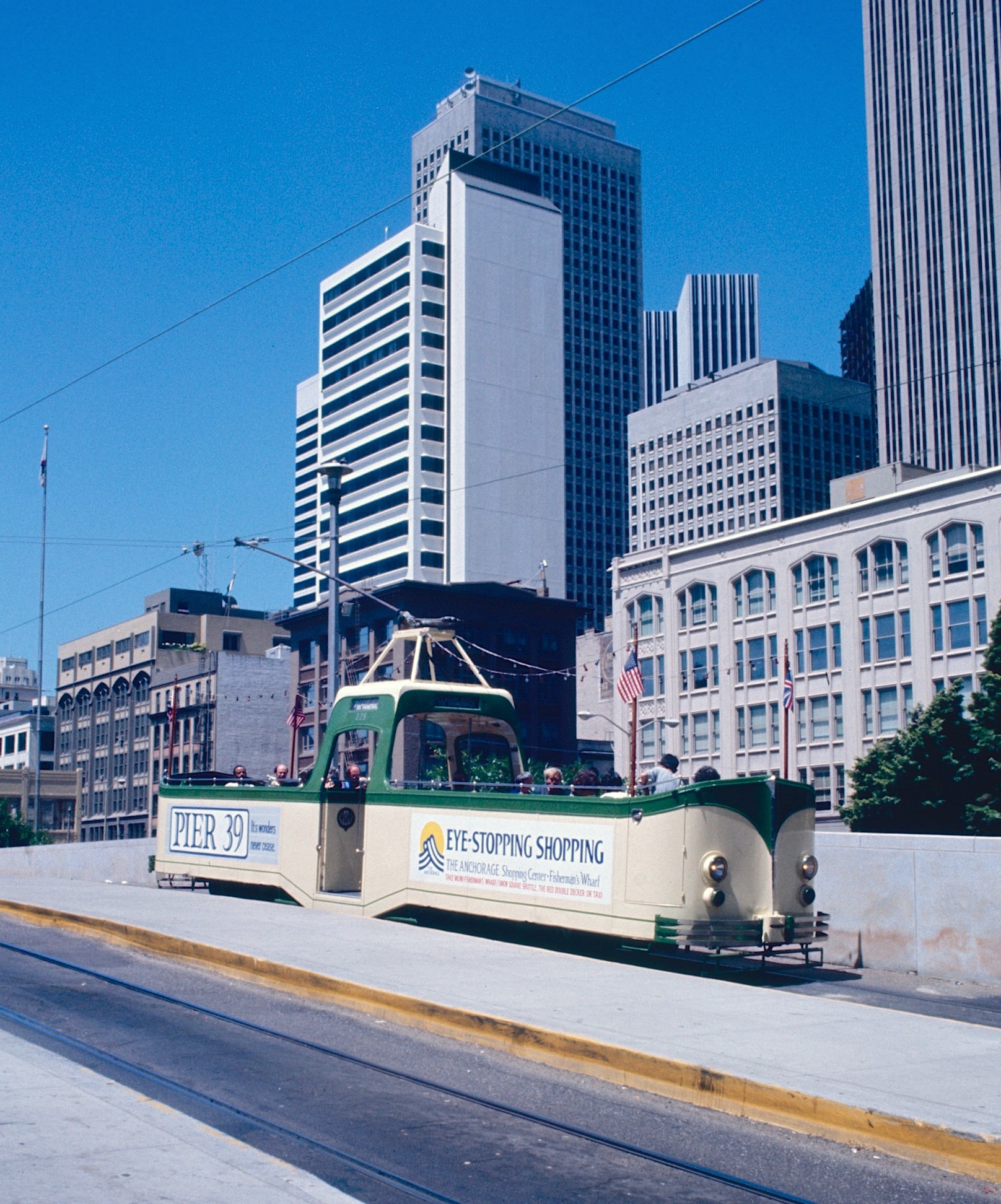
Blackpool "boat" car 226 laying over at the Transbay Terminal in 1983

The second season of the Historic Trolley Festival began on June 7, 1984, again with a parade led by car 1, with Mayor Feinstein at the controls. It continued until September 17. It again ran daily except Tuesdays and Wednesdays. An expanded fleet allowed the headway to be shortened to 12 minutes. Single-ended cars now ran on the N-Judah line instead of J-Church, and up to five such cars were in operation at a time. The "F–Market" route designation began to appear more than it had in the first season, in the form of new dash signs.

Three new streetcars joined the operating fleet for the 1984 season, all single-ended:

- Milan (Italy) 1834 was a circa-1928-built "Peter Witt-type car, an American design, built in Italy. It was donated, or sold to the city at low cost, and arrived on August 4. (This was the first Milan streetcar in San Francisco, but in 1984 Muni was already considering acquiring more, and several more such cars entered service on the regular F-line in 2000, when that line was extended to Fisherman's Wharf.)
- Veracruz, Mexico, No. 001 was a single-ended, single-truck (four-wheel), open-bench streetcar retired when the Veracruz streetcar system closed in 1981. It had been built in 1977, for tourist service, on the underframe of car 8 with a new body in the style of the system's 1908 Brill-built cars. Its loan was sponsored by the Mexican government and the mayor of Veracruz. Because it was single-ended, it could not cover the full Trolley Festival route, and it operated between the Transbay Terminal and 11th Street.
- San Francisco 1006 was a double-ended PCC car built for Muni in 1948. It had been converted to single-ended configuration in the mid-1950s, and although restoration of its double-ended layout was planned, this did not occur until 1985. In 1984, it could operate only as a single-ended car, which limited its route.

1950 Marmon-Herrington trolleybus 776 ran in service on route 8–Market on weekends. The Milan and Veracruz streetcars entered service in August. The 1984 festival ended on September 17, earlier than planned because of a funding shortfall, but a reduced, weekends-only service continued through New Year's Day 1985, similar to the previous year. An estimated 300,000 passengers were carried during 1984.

== 1985 season ==
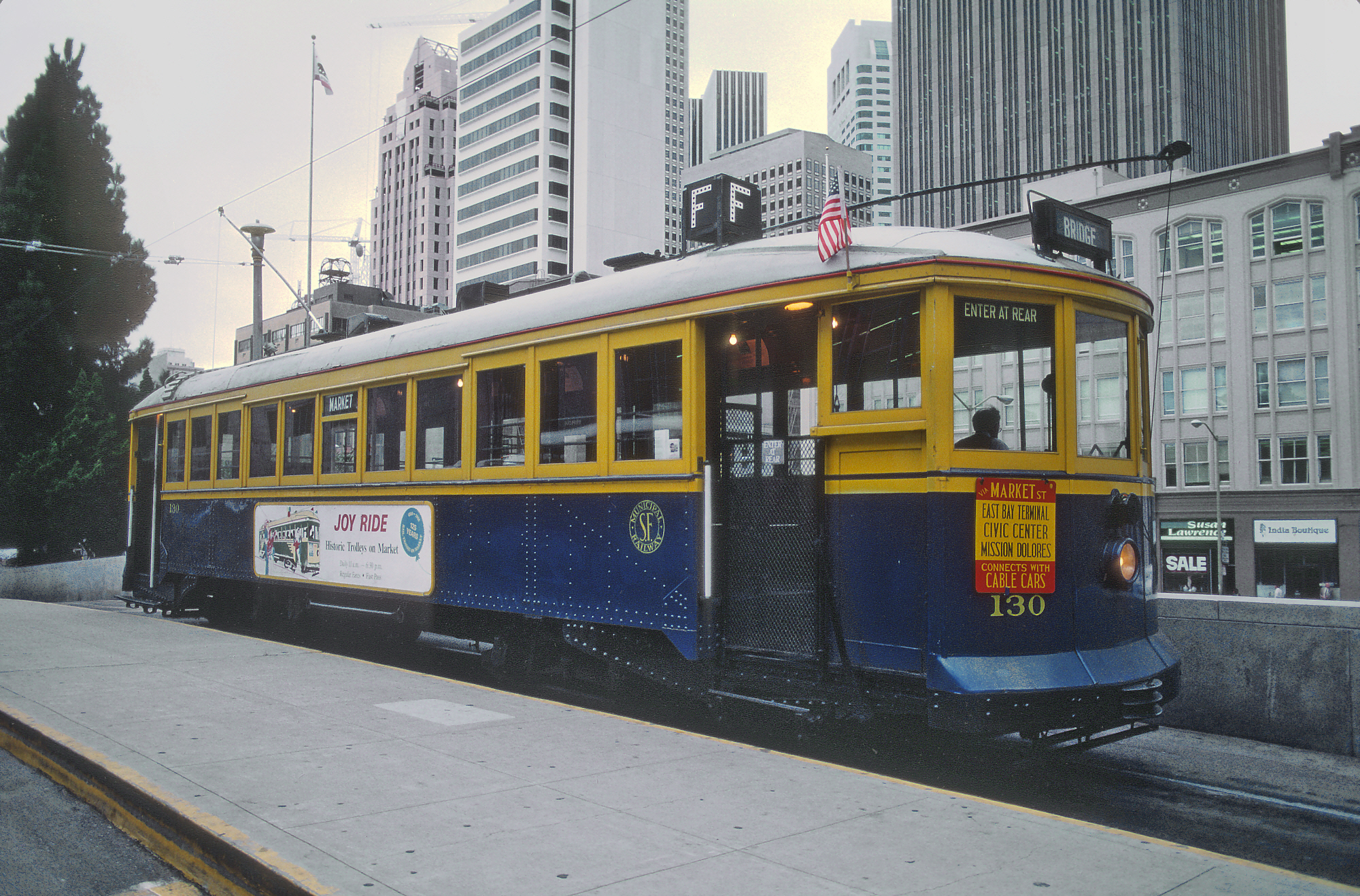
San Francisco car 130 at the Transbay Terminal in 1985

In 1985, the Trolley Festival operated seven days a week for the only time. The third season opened on May 23, 1985, with the customary parade featuring Mayor Feinstein again piloting 1912 car 1. It continued until October 15, which made it the longest season to date, not including the weekend-only operation that occurred in the autumns of 1983 and 1984, after the ends of the "regular" seasons. In 1985, there was no service after October 15. The general operating pattern remained the same, with 12-minute headways and single-ended cars running on the N line while double-ended cars ran to 17th & Castro as before. Expanding to seven-days-a-week service also increased Muni's costs, which amounted to $673,000 in 1985.

There were again some changes in the operating fleet. After a one-year absence, Portland Brill car 503 returned for its second and last season. Open-top Blackpool "boat" car 226 had gone back to the Western Railway Museum, but another streetcar of the same type, No. 228, replaced it, having been purchased from Blackpool. San Francisco car 578, a short, semi-open trolley built in 1895 for the Market Street Railway joined the fleet, restored by Muni. 578, the oldest streetcar ever to operate in Festival service, operated mainly on weekends, and only as far as 11th Street. Notably, a railfan-chartered train composed of Boeing LRVs 1212 and 1213 ran down Market Street on August 25. This was the only occurrence of a two-car train operating on the surface.

It was the last season for Veracruz open-sided car 001, which left San Francisco on November 6, 1985 to return home.

== Proposed discontinuation ==
The Trolley Festival came close to being discontinued at the end of the 1985 season. The city was facing a budget crisis and directed Muni to make service cuts. Along with several bus routes, the Festival was recommended for elimination by Muni officials. The editors of The San Francisco Chronicle argued in support of the trolleys, calling the Trolley Festival "one of San Francisco's most unique and endearing new features" and "a resounding success. ... It would be unfortunate if the city's budgetary problems terminate such an appealing and successful attraction." Support from the mayor and others spared the festival, but service would be cut back to five days a week.

== 1986 season ==
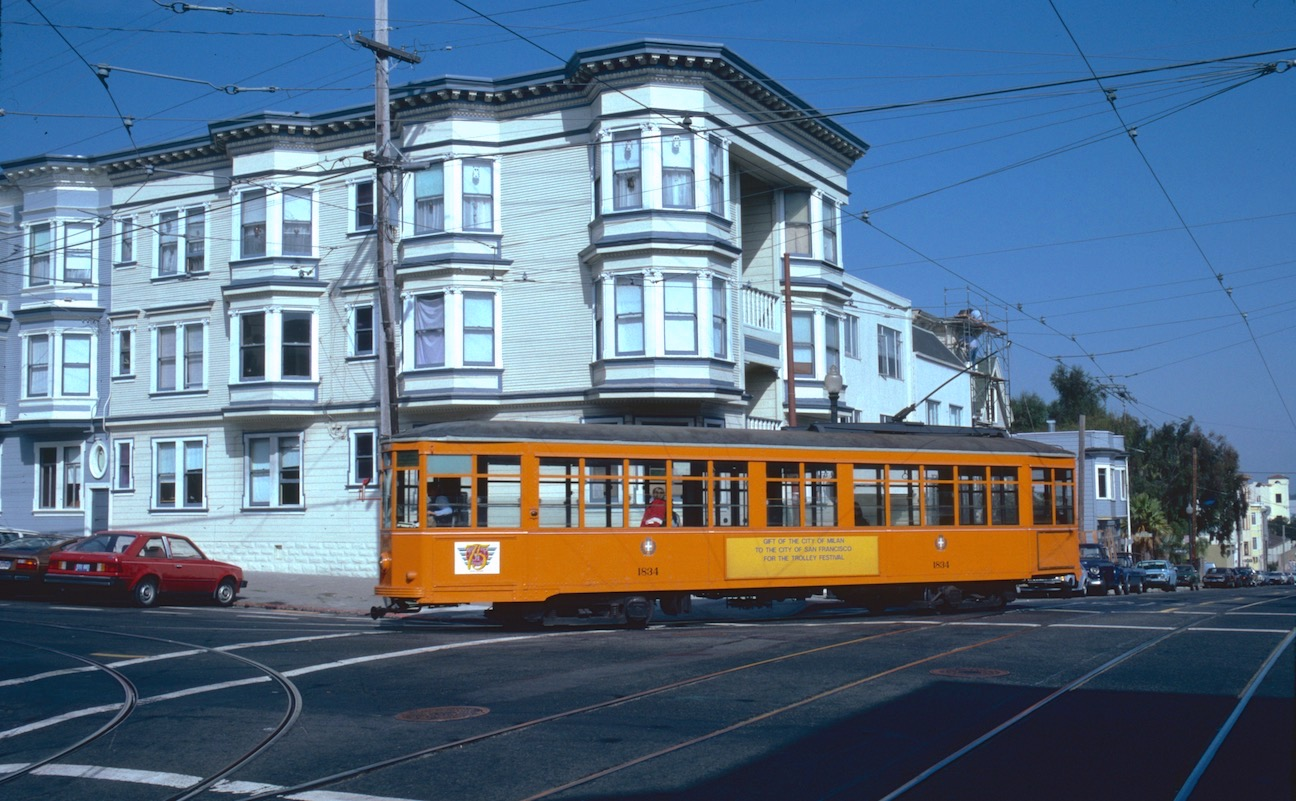
Milan 1834, a "Peter Witt"-type streetcar, turning from 17th Street into the 1986-built wye on Noe Street

Two significant operations changes occurred with the 1986 season. The first resulted from the installation, in early May 1986, of a track "wye" at 17th and Noe streets, which enabled single-ended streetcars to turn around at a location near the 17th & Castro terminus. With this facility in place, all Trolley Festival cars could now cover the same route, from the Transbay Terminal to 17th & Castro, providing a more consistent and reliable service. The opening-day parade took place on May 19, 1986, and was led by a streetcar that was new to the fleet: Ex-Hiroshima, Japan, car 578, dating from 1927. It was originally car 574 in the fleet of Kobe, Japan. (Because the Japanese car has the same number as a San Francisco streetcar being used in the festivals, the two were often referred to as 578-J and 578-S, respectively, to avoid confusion.) This car, however, was not ready to enter service until September 1, 1986.

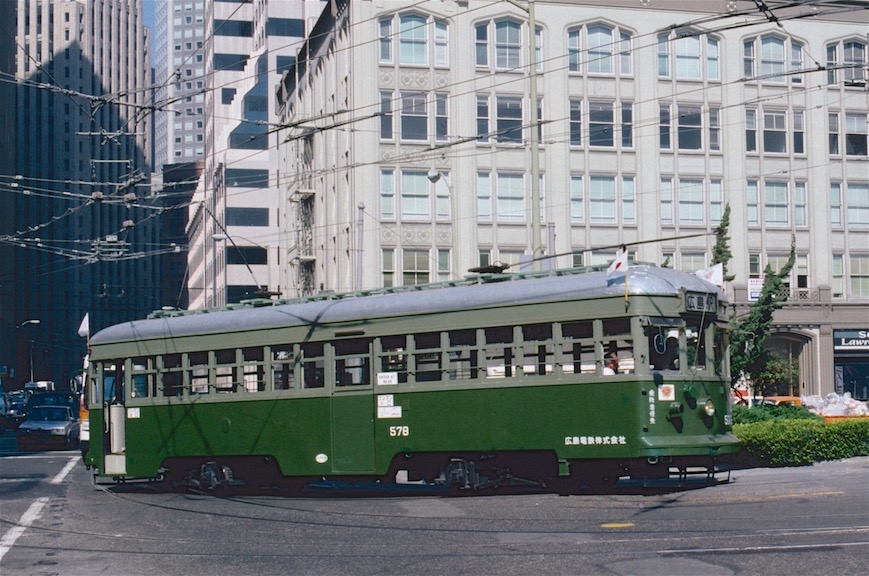
Kobe (Japan) streetcar 578 turning into the Transbay Terminal

The second major change was that the schedule was cut back to five days a week, and instead of daily except Tuesdays and Wednesdays the service would run only Monday to Friday, with no weekend service. San Francisco Chronicle columnist Herb Caen criticized the decision not to run on weekends, writing that it was "Ridiculous .... Weekends are when most people have time to ride these delightful vehicles." The scheduled hours were 10:30 a.m. to 6:30 p.m., and the headway was improved to 10 minutes. The service continued to be well-used in 1986, and ridership growth of 10 percent to 15 percent over 1985 was reported.

The switches for the wye on Noe Street were taken from the intersection of Broad & Plymouth on the M line, where a wye had been installed in 1957 but was no longer needed, as a result of the M line's 1980 extension from there to Muni's Metro Center (later renamed the Curtis E. Green Light Rail Center) and the 1982 elimination of PCC cars on the line. With Trolley Festival service, outbound single-ended streetcars would turn onto Noe Street from 17th, then run backwards around the corner onto 17th westbound and continue backing up for the last block along 17th to the Castro terminus. (Several years later, this maneuver was made unnecessary by the installation of track on Market Street between Duboce Avenue and Castro Street, forming a one-way loop via Market, Noe and 17th streets for F-line service.)

== 1987 season ==
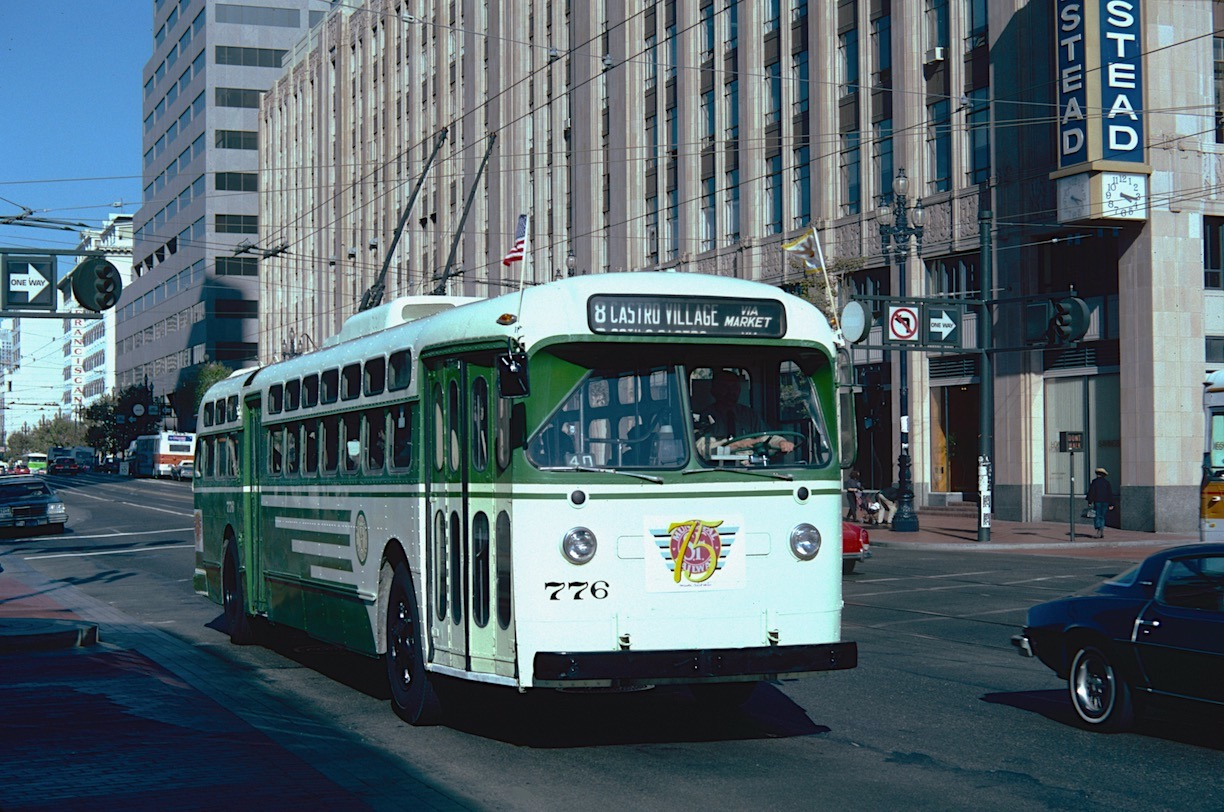
San Francisco Muni's own trolleybus 776, built in 1950 by Marmon-Herrington, in regular service on route 8 during the 1987 festival

The fifth season of the Historic Trolley Festival was its last. It ran from May 14 to October 17. The schedule was expanded to six days a week, from about 10:30 a.m. to 6 p.m. and the headway kept at 10 minutes. (or 9:50 a.m. to 5:50 p.m. on weekdays, 10:50 a.m. to 6:50 p.m. on Saturdays).

An addition to the fleet was No. 106, a short, single-truck, single-ended trolley car from Orel, Russia, which was originally built for the Moscow street railway system, in 1912. It had arrived in June 1986, but was not ready to enter service. The only other fleet change was the removal of Melbourne 648, which had been sold to the Bay Area Electric Railway Association and moved to the Western Railway Museum; it was replaced by a different tram of the same type, No. 496. Muni purchased W2-class tram 496 from Melbourne's tram system. During this season, restored San Francisco Marmon-Herrington trolleybus No. 776 operated in service on route 8-Market – which was almost identical to the F line over most of its route (and indeed was replaced by the F line in 1995) – "at least one day a week for most of the summer", Don Jewell wrote in Pacific RailNews.

=== Embarcadero demonstration service ===
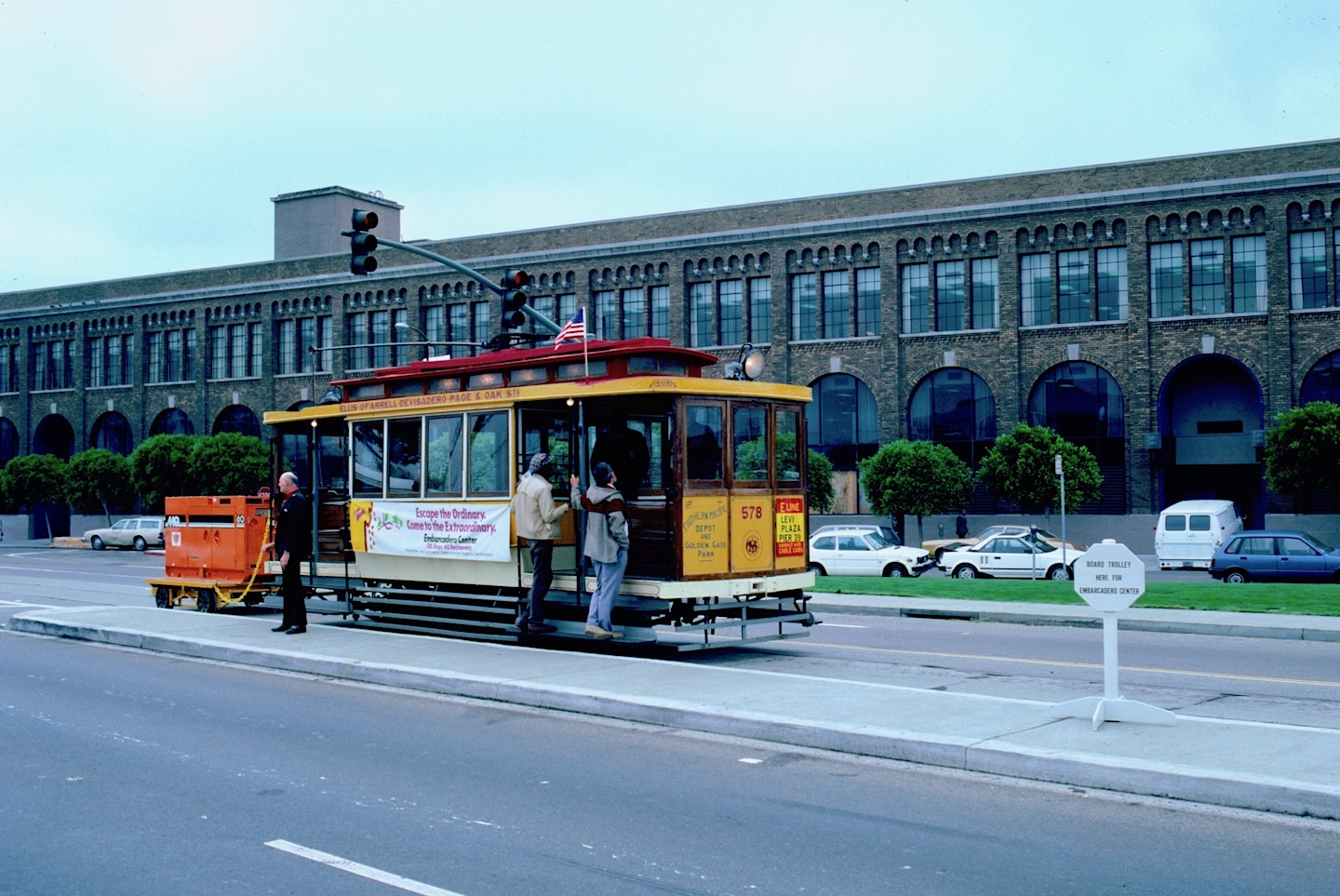
Ex-Market Street Railway car 578 laying over at Pier 39 on September 25, 1987

A short-lived but very notable feature of the 1987 Trolley Festival was the operation of a streetcar service along the Embarcadero over a five-week period starting in mid-September. In the previous decade there had been proposals to establish a historic streetcar service there. Freight tracks of the San Francisco Belt Railroad already existed along that street, but the railroad ceased using them in 1985. The Trolley Festivals had fostered interest in the still-active proposal. Maurice Klebolt suggested a brief demonstration streetcar service to test its viability and gauge demand. Muni agreed, and the city's Public Utilities Commission gave final approval on September 8. Because the disused freight tracks were not equipped with overhead trolley wires, the electricity powering the streetcars' motors would be supplied by diesel generators towed or pushed on small trailers. Two streetcars were employed for this demonstration: 1895-built San Francisco car 578 and 1929-built Porto car 189.

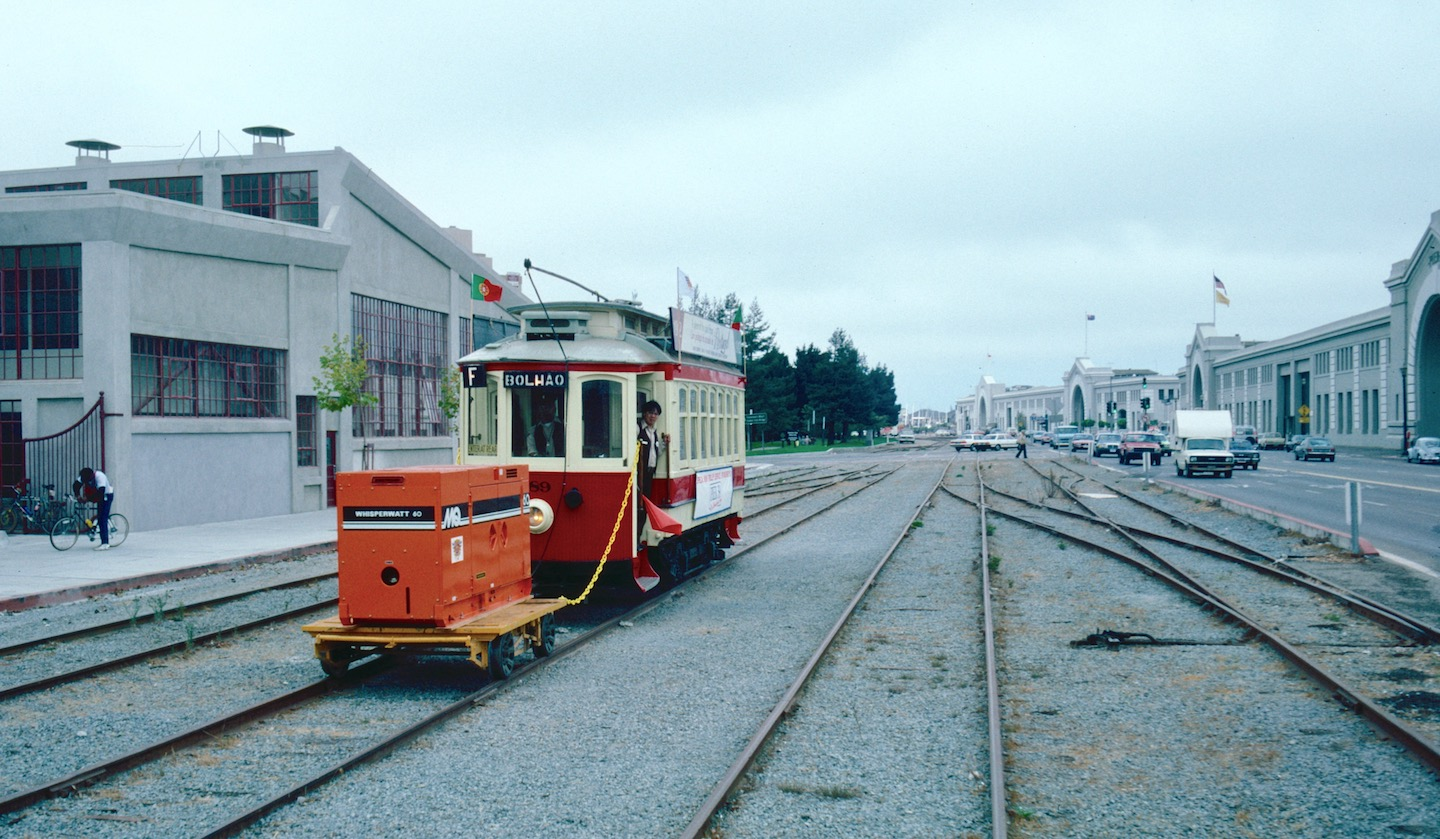
Porto streetcar No. 189 pushing the attached generator cart while traveling south along the Embarcadero on San Francisco Belt Railroad tracks

The service began on September 11 and concluded on October 17. It operated only on Fridays and Saturdays, from 10 a.m. to 6 p.m., with both cars in service concurrently, on a scheduled headway of 15 minutes. Temporary stops were set up, with the termini being at the Ferry Building (under the elevated Embarcadero Freeway) and across from Pier 39, with one intermediate stop at Levi's Plaza. Earlier in the year, before the idea had been fully approved, Muni briefly ran a similar operation using car 578 from April 15–19 between Pier 39 and Pier 27 only, in connection with a railfan event known as "Railfair".

== Legacy ==
The five seasons of The Historic Trolley Festival operation helped to establish strong public and business support for the then-proposed full-time F-line streetcar service (an all-day, daily, year-round service) that started in 1995.

== See also ==
- E Embarcadero and F Market & Wharves
- San Francisco Municipal Railway fleet
- Streetcars in North America
