= Broad and Plymouth station =

Light rail stop in San Francisco, California, US

Broad and Plymouth
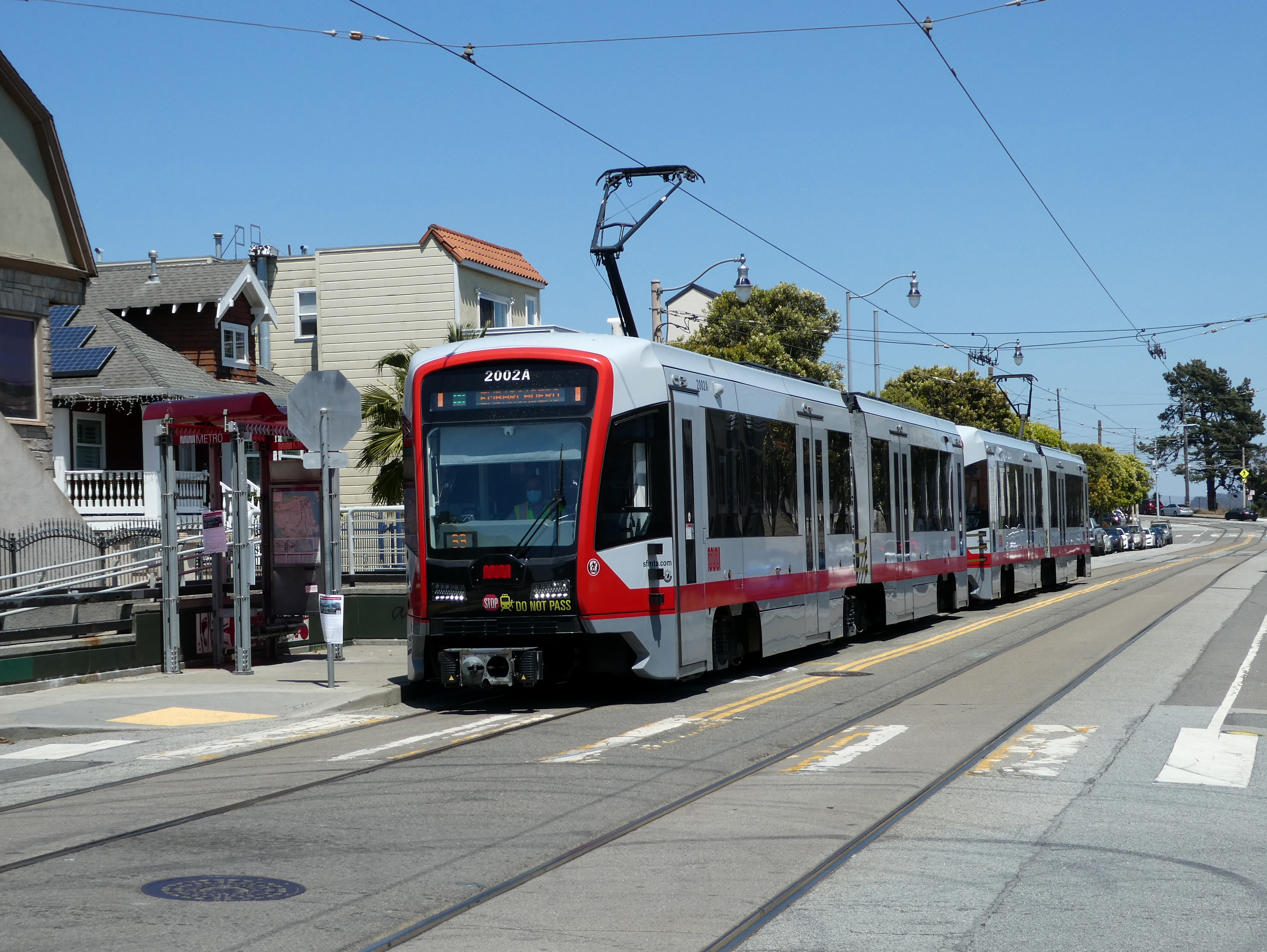
- An inbound train at Broad and Plymouth in July 2023

General information
- Location: Broad Street at Plymouth Avenue; San Francisco, California
- Coordinates: 37.71318°N 122.45608°W
- Platforms: 2 side platforms
- Tracks: 2
- Connections: Muni: 54

Construction
- Accessible: Yes

History
- Opened: October 6, 1925

Services
Preceding station	Muni	Following station
Broad and Capitol toward Embarcadero	M Ocean View	San Jose and Farallones toward San Jose and Geneva (Balboa Park)
Location

Broad and Plymouth station is a light rail stop on the Muni Metro M Ocean View line, located in the Ingleside neighborhood of San Francisco, California. The station has transit bulbs which extend the sidewalk of Broad Street, to meet trains like a side platform, allowing passengers to board or depart from trains. The stops are located just before trains cross Plymouth Avenue and include accessible mini-high platforms.

== History ==
The San Francisco Municipal Railway opened its M Ocean View line on October 6, 1925, as a shuttle service between St. Francis Circle and Broad Street at Plymouth Avenue, where a crossover was located to allow streetcars to reverse direction. From October 31, 1927, to February 27, 1928, through service to Ferry Loop was available. The line was replaced with buses on August 6, 1939, but streetcar service resumed on December 17, 1944; through service to the East Bay Terminal began on June 6, 1948. In 1951–52, Muni acquired a fleet of new PCC streetcars – the first Muni streetcars with a cab at only one end. These single-ended cars required a loop or wye to turn around at terminals, as they could not simply reverse direction. A wye was constructed at Broad and Plymouth; it was put in service on December 6, 1957, with PCC streetcars entering M Ocean View service on December 23.

After a four-year bus substitution from 1974 to 1978 for conversion to Muni Metro, the line was extended to the carhouses at Balboa Park station in 1980. All service was extended to Balboa Park on August 30, but cut back to Broad and Plymouth on October 3 due to track problems on the extension. Weekday service to Balboa Park with LRVs resumed on December 17, though PCC streetcars continued to use the wye at Plymouth Avenue as the weekend terminal. Weekend service to Balboa Park with LRVs began on September 19, 1982. The wye at Plymouth Avenue was removed in 1986; the switches were moved to 17th Street at Noe Street for use during the San Francisco Historic Trolley Festival. A crossover, which is only used occasionally, was later installed east of Plymouth Avenue.

In 2022, the SFMTA begin planning the M Ocean View Transit and Safety Project, a MuniForward project intended to improve reliability of the segment between Junipero Serra Boulevard and Balboa Park station. Initial proposals released that September did not call for any changes at Broad and Plymouth. A revised proposal in May 2023 also proposed no changes to the stop.
