= Rick Laubscher =

Non-profit executive (b. 1949)

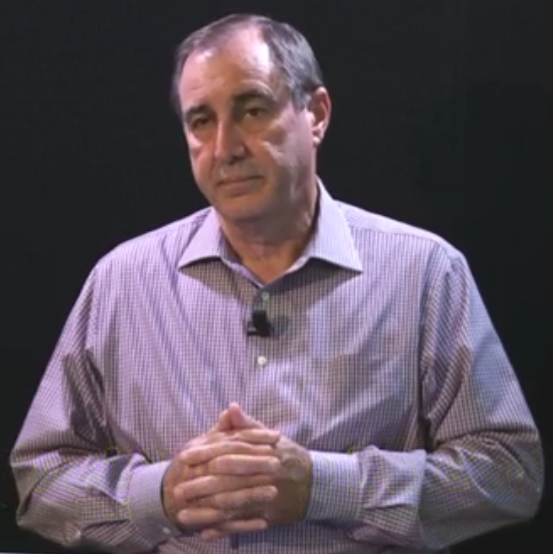
- Giving a talk at the San Francisco Public Library in 2014
- Born: 1949 (age 76–77); San Francisco, California, US
- Education: Columbia School of Journalism
- Occupations: Businessperson, journalist

Rick Laubscher (born 1949) is president and CEO of San Francisco non-profit Market Street Railway. Noted for his civic contributions to the city of San Francisco, Laubscher is a former reporter and public relations executive.

== Early life ==
Born in 1949 in San Francisco, Laubscher grew up working in his family's delicatessen, Laubscher Brothers Delicatessen, at Grant Market on Market Street. He attended college at UC Santa Cruz, where he created the university's first radio station.

== Career ==
Laubscher attended the Columbia School of Journalism to obtain his master's degree in journalism, where he graduated first in his class. He received the Pulitzer Fellowship; upon graduation, he used the fellowship to spend a year traveling and reporting from different locations around the world. When he returned to California, he began his career as a journalist. He took his first job at KGTV in San Diego, where he interviewed then-presidential candidate Ronald Reagan and received two "Golden Mike" awards for his work. In 1977, he returned to San Francisco to report for KRON-TV.

In 1978, Laubscher was one of the first reporters on the scene at the Moscone–Milk assassinations. Laubscher was acquainted with both victims as well as the killer, Dan White, and his coverage of the event earned an Emmy award. He also covered the Jonestown massacre the same year.

In 1981, Laubscher left reporting and transitioned to a public relations career as an executive with the Bechtel Group. After 18 years with the Bechtel Group, he left to found his own communications company, Messagesmith.

== Civic involvement ==
As Chair of the San Francisco Chamber of Commerce Transportation committee, Laubscher organized the inaugural Historic Trolley Festival in collaboration with then-Mayor Dianne Feinstein in 1982. In 1985, he established Market Street Railway as a non-profit organization. His work with Market Street Railway was instrumental in establishing the city's historic F Line, which opened in 1995 and is now the most popular transit line of its kind in the United States. He continues to serve as President and CEO of Market Street Railway.

In 1987, Laubscher was the founding Chairman of the City Club of San Francisco, one of the first fully operating business organizations in the San Francisco Financial District. In 2011, Laubscher received the Silver SPUR Award from the San Francisco Bay Area Planning and Urban Research Association for notable civic achievement.
