= Building 101 (San Francisco) =

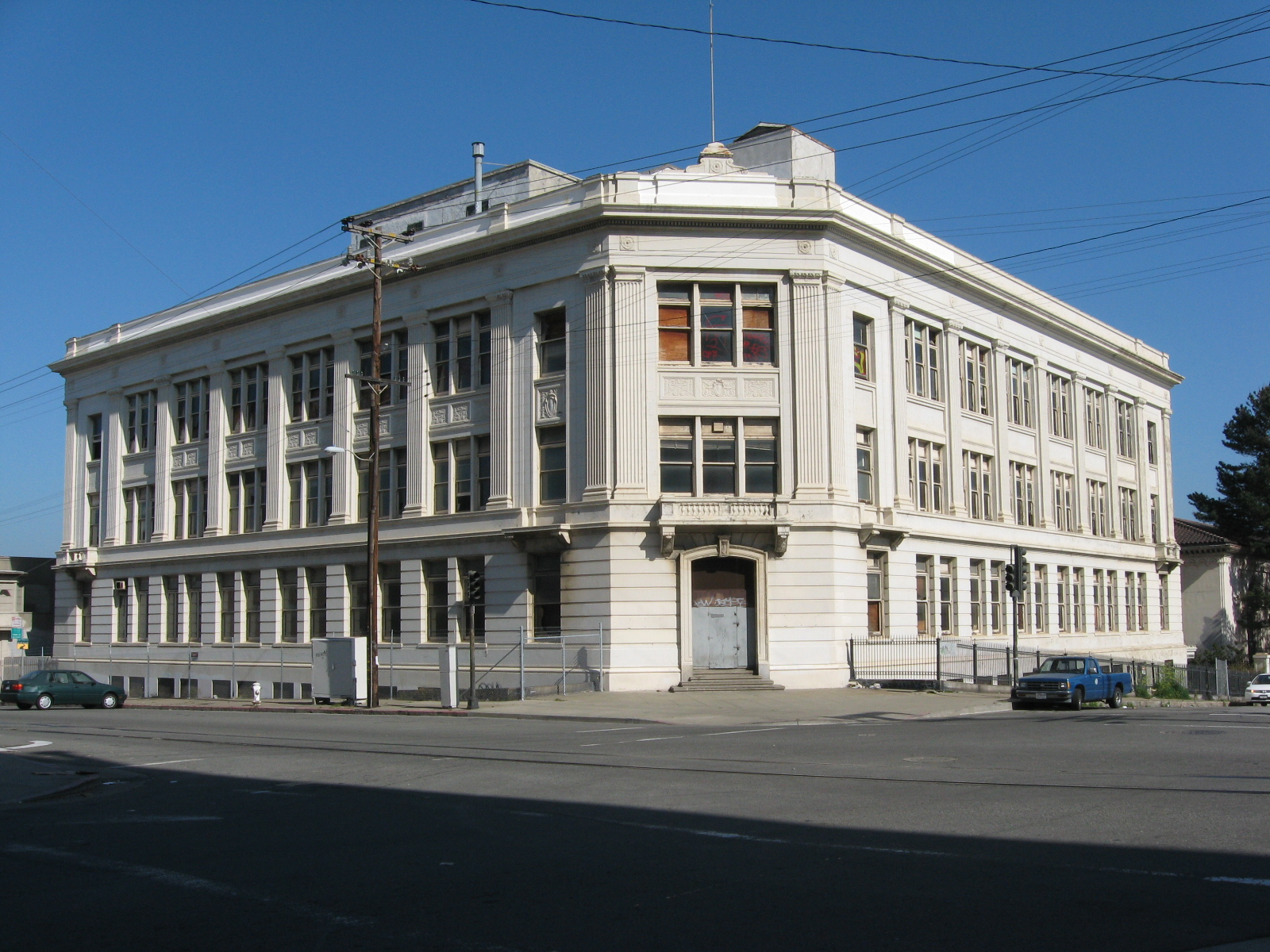
- Old Bethelem Steel Headquarters in San Francisco

- Location within Northern California

General information
- Location: Corner of 20th and Illinois Streets, 590 20th Street, San Francisco
- Coordinates: 37°45′39″N 122°23′14″W
- Completed: 1917

Design and construction
- Architect: Frederick H. Meyer

Website
- rh.com/us/en/sanfrancisco/

Building 101 is a United States neoclassical building located in San Francisco's Dogpatch neighborhood, designed by Frederick H. Meyer. It was the Bethlehem Shipbuilding Corporation headquarters and is a contributing property to the Union Iron Works historic district, listed on the National Register of Historic Places on April 17, 2014.

== History ==
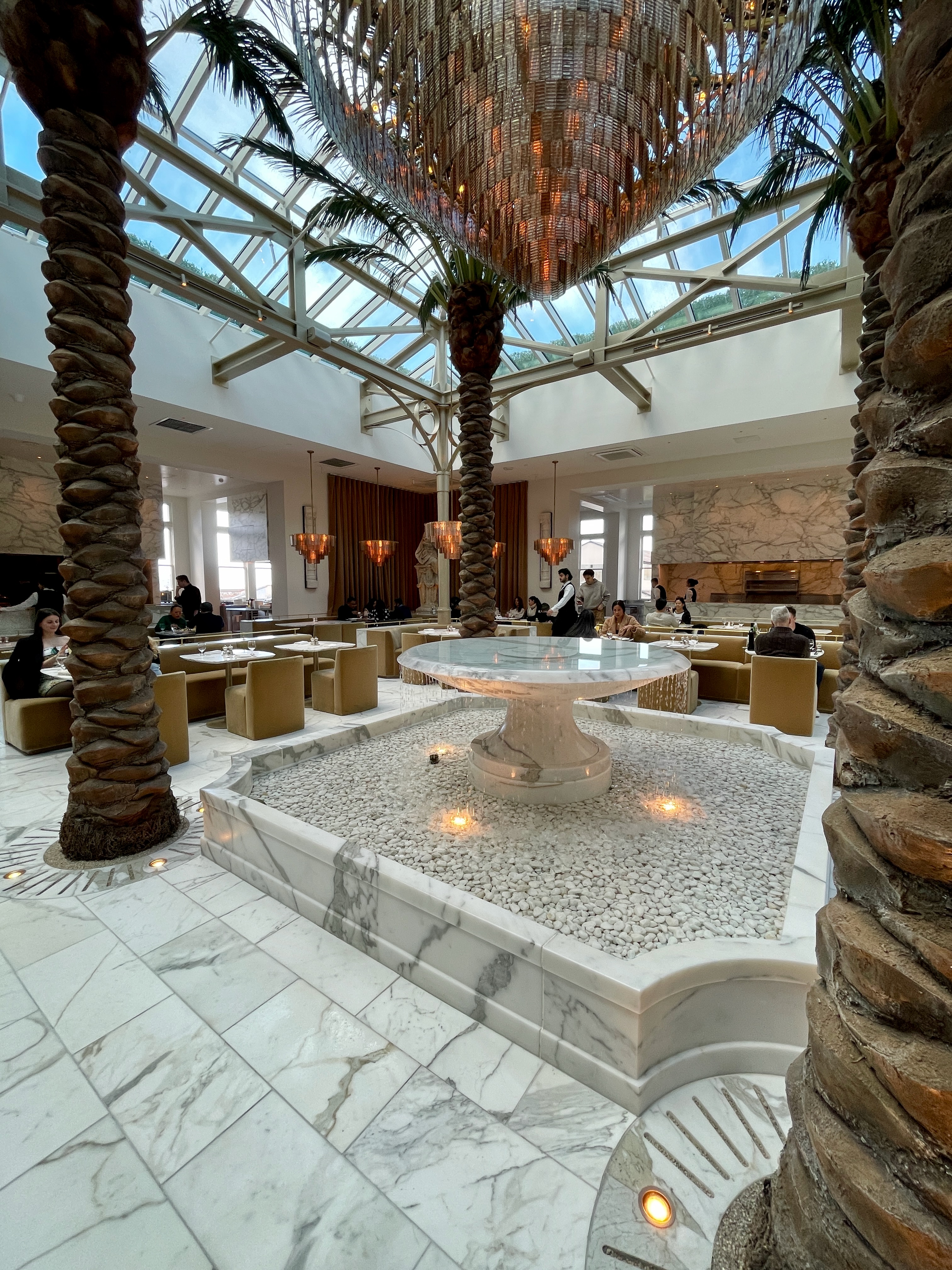
Palm Court Dining Room by RH

The building was built in 1917 for Bethlehem Steel Corporation, which used it as an administrative building while it owned the Bethlehem Shipbuilding Corporation operations on adjacent Pier 70.

Building 101 was originally intended to house offices for 350 people, including executives, draftsmen, and naval architects, and included blueprint facilities. By 1945, it also included a Navy cafeteria and a private branch exchange for telephone service.

The structure has five-stories and 80,000 square feet (7,400 m^{2}) of space. It was renovated and redesigned into a furniture gallery and restaurant by RH. It opened in 2022.
