= San Jose and Lakeview station =

Muni Metro light rail stop in San Francisco

San Jose and Lakeview
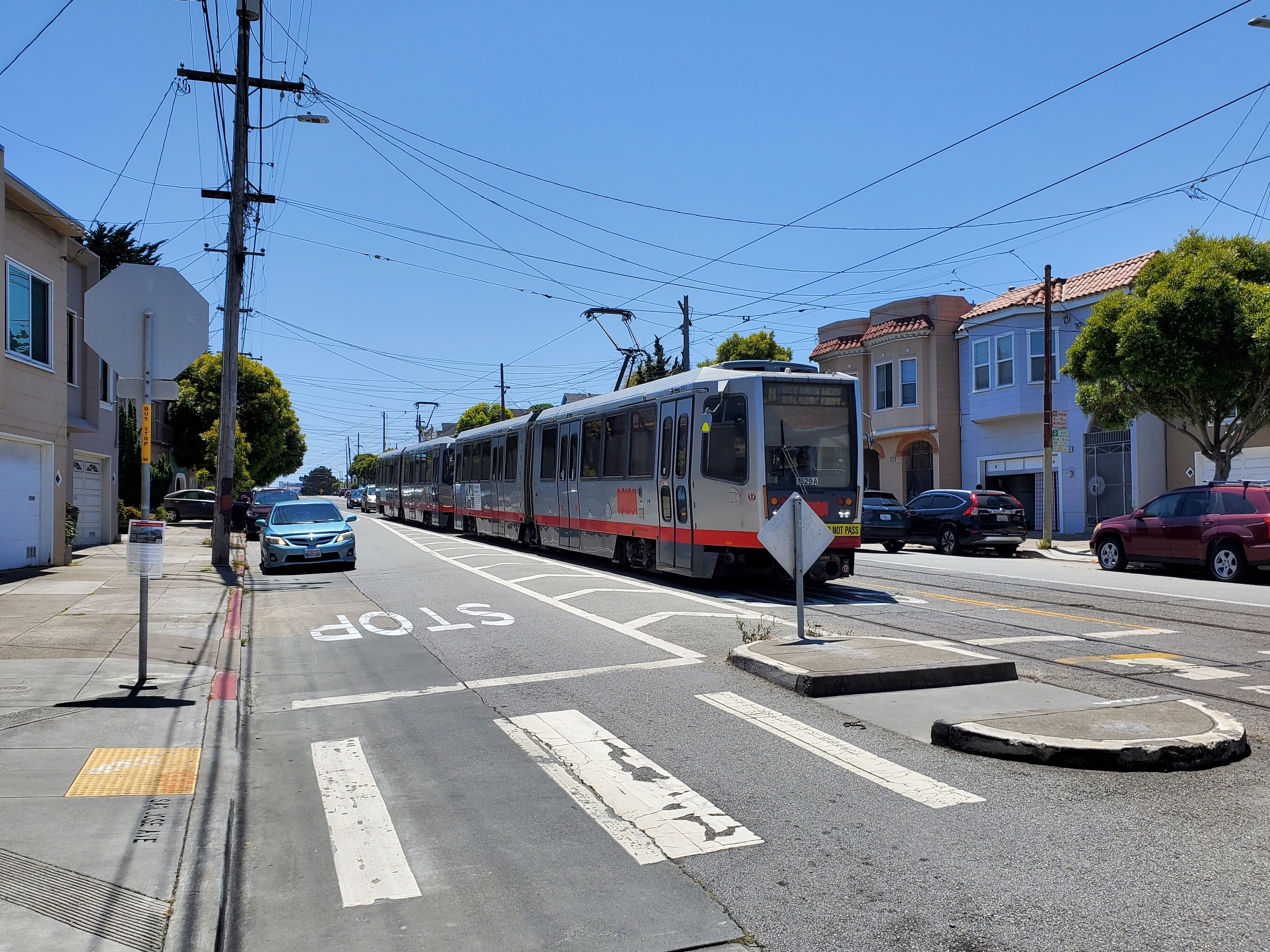
- An outbound train at San Jose and Lakeview in July 2023

General information
- Location: San Jose Avenue at Lakeview Avenue; San Francisco, California
- Coordinates: 37.71616°N 122.45040°W
- Platforms: 2 side platforms
- Tracks: 2

Construction
- Accessible: No

History
- Opened: August 30, 1980

Services
Preceding station	Muni	Following station
San Jose and Farallones toward Embarcadero	M Ocean View	San Jose and Geneva (Balboa Park) Terminus
Location

San Jose and Lakeview station is a light rail stop on the Muni Metro M Ocean View line, located in the Ingleside neighborhood of San Francisco, California. It has two side platform boarding islands on San Jose Avenue at Lakeview Avenue. The stop is not accessible. It opened with the extension of the line to Balboa Park station on August 30, 1980.

In 2022, the SFMTA begin planning the M Ocean View Transit and Safety Project, a MuniForward project intended to improve reliability of the segment between Junipero Serra Boulevard and Balboa Park station. Initial proposals released that September called for the platforms at Lakeview to be extended. A revised proposal in May 2023 called for the extended platforms to be long enough for two-car trains. The project was approved by the SFMTA Board in February 2024. The new boarding islands at San Jose and Lakeview were built in December 2025.
