= San Jose and Farallones station =

Muni Metro light rail stop in San Francisco

San Jose and Farallones
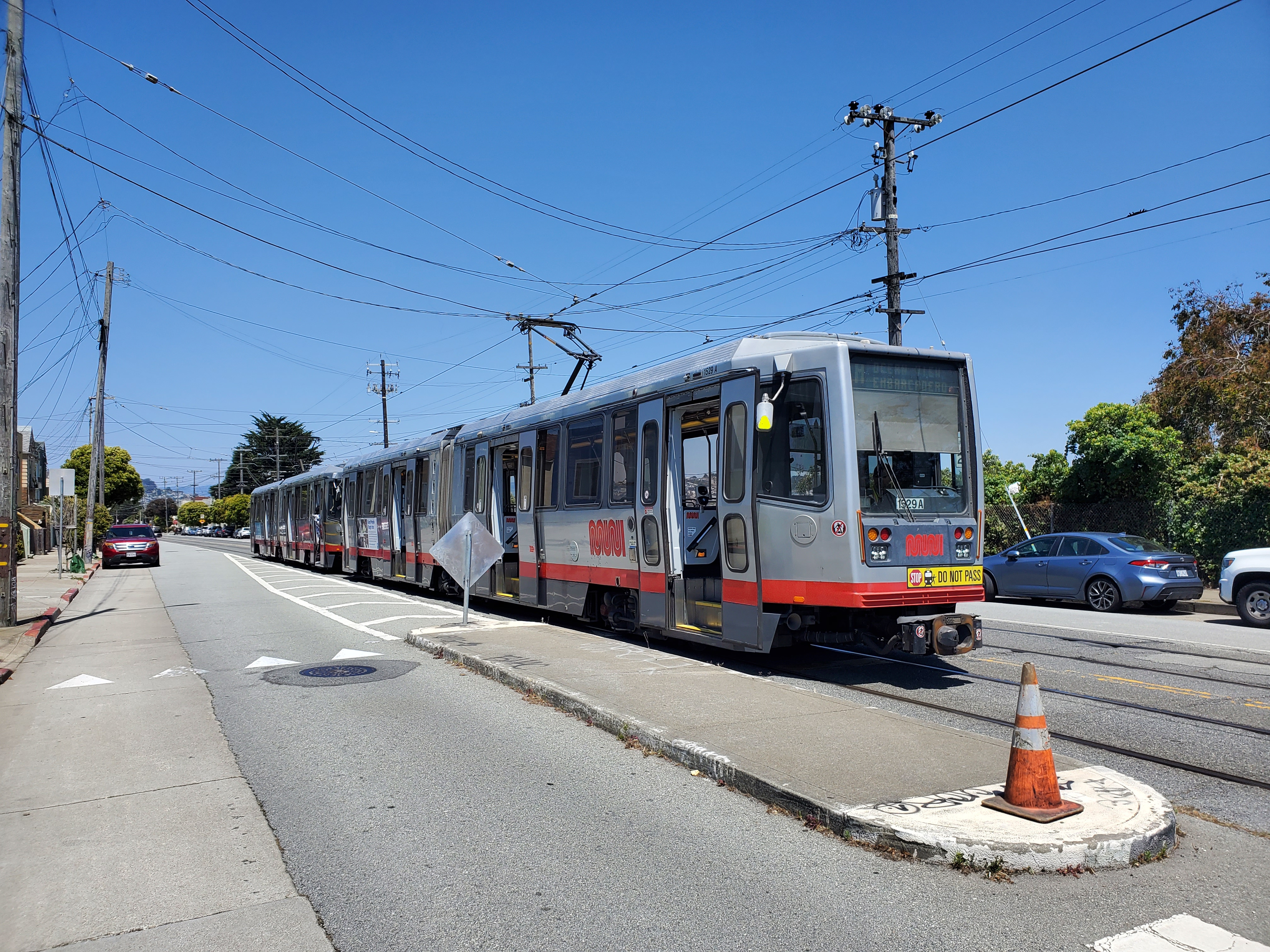
- An inbound train at San Jose and Farallones in July 2023

General information
- Location: San Jose Avenue at Farallones Street; San Francisco, California
- Coordinates: 37°42′51″N 122°27′08″W
- Platforms: 2 side platforms
- Tracks: 2

Construction
- Accessible: No

History
- Opened: August 30, 1980

Services
Preceding station	Muni	Following station
Broad and Plymouth toward Embarcadero	M Ocean View	San Jose and Lakeview toward San Jose and Geneva (Balboa Park)
Location

San Jose and Farallones station is a light rail stop on the Muni Metro M Ocean View line, located in the Oceanview neighborhood of San Francisco, California. The station has two side platforms (traffic islands) in the middle of San Jose Avenue. The platforms are not accessible. The station opened with the extension of the line to Balboa Park station on August 30, 1980.

In 2022, the SFMTA begin planning the M Ocean View Transit and Safety Project, a MuniForward project intended to improve reliability of the segment between Junipero Serra Boulevard and Balboa Park station. Initial proposals released that September called for the platforms at Farallones to be extended. A revised proposal in May 2023 also called for the outbound platform to be moved to the north side of the intersection. A further revision in August 2023 moved the platform slightly further north, with a crosswalk to the sidewalk at the north end of the platform. As of October 2023, "quick-build" implementation of some changes is expected to begin in late 2023, with main construction beginning in 2026.
