= Market Street Railway (nonprofit) =

Nonprofit that preserves historic transit vehicles

- Named after: Market Street Railway Company
- Founded: 1977; 49 years ago
- Type: Nonprofit
- Purpose: Preservation of historic transit vehicles
- Location: San Francisco, California
- Members: 1,000
- Key people: Rick Laubscher (President & CEO)
- Website: streetcar.org

Market Street Railway is San Francisco Municipal Railway's (Muni) 1,000-member non-profit preservation partner. It relies on private contributions to help support San Francisco’s fleet of historic streetcars in service on the F Market & Wharves lines. It also supports Muni's operation of the National Historic Landmark cable cars.

In 2006, Market Street Railway opened the San Francisco Railway Museum at the F-line Steuart Street stop, across from the Ferry Building, where it interprets and celebrates how public transit has fueled San Francisco's expansion since 1860.

Market Street Railway borrows the name of the Market Street Railway Company, a former commercial streetcar and bus operator in San Francisco.

== History ==
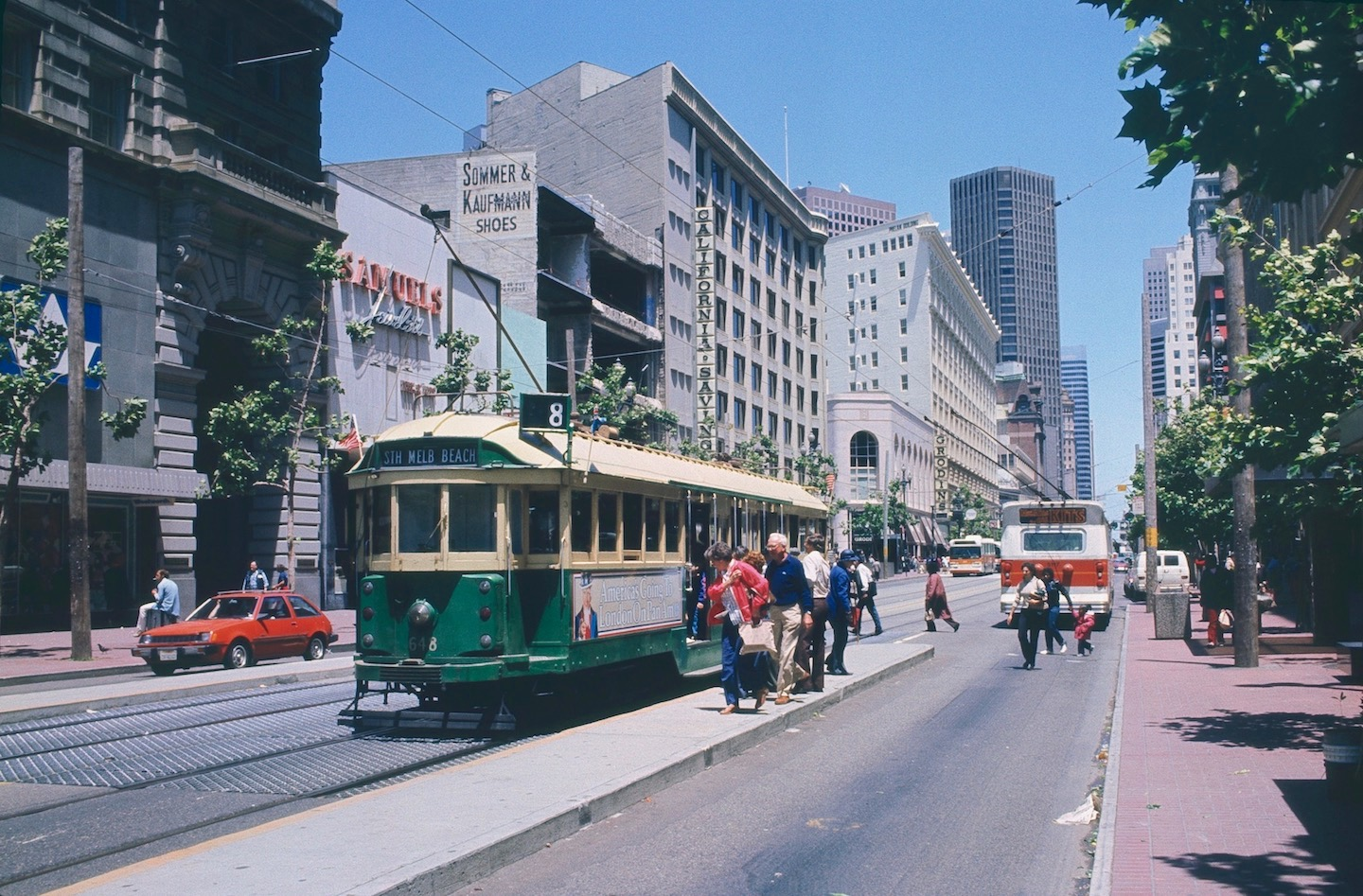
Melbourne tram 648 on Market Street during the first San Francisco Historic Trolley Festival

Founded in 1977, Market Street Railway members created the successful San Francisco Historic Trolley Festivals of the 1980s that resulted in the permanent return of historic streetcars to Market Street in the form of the F Market & Wharves line — the most popular service of its kind in all of North America.

Service on the line, then called F Market, commenced on September 1, 1995, replacing Muni's 8 Market trolleybus line. In 1996, one year after service began, F Market streetcars carried an average of 7,758 passengers per day, a 43% increase in ridership over the 8 Market trolleybus.

In the late 1990s, the Embarcadero was rebuilt as a tree-lined boulevard with streetcar tracks in the median. On March 4, 2000, the F Market line was extended to use the new tracks to travel between the Ferry Building and Fisherman's Wharf at the northern end of the waterfront. By 2008, F Market streetcars were carrying an average of 20,000 riders per day, and were so overcrowded that drivers were sometimes forced to skip stops. For comparison, the Muni Metro system carried an average of 130,000 passengers per day through the Market Street subway in 1999.

Service again expanded in 2015 with the E Embarcadero line which utilized the tracks on the Embarcadero south of the Ferry Building to Caltrain's 4th and King station. This second vintage streetcar line was suspended, along with all other Muni rail service, in April 2020 as a result of the COVID outbreak, and has yet to resume.

Since its inception, Market Street Railway has helped Muni to acquire and restore more than a dozen historic streetcars and cable cars for service, adding diversity to Muni’s large historic fleet. Market Street Railway's restoration corps performed some of this restoration work themselves. Its volunteers also clean the cars' interiors at the Castro Street Terminal to improve rider experience.

In 2023, Market Street Railway co-sponsored with Muni a series of civic events celebrating the 150th anniversary of the invention of the cable car in San Francisco by Andrew Hallidie. In 2024, it co-sponsored the dedication of Cable Car number 53 to the late singer Tony Bennett, in recognition of his love of the cable cars.

Since 2012, Muni's centennial year, Market Street Railway has co-sponsored with Muni an annual celebration of historic transit called Muni Heritage Weekend (not held during COVID years). Centered at the San Francisco Railway Museum, the public can ride rarely-operated vintage streetcars, trolleybuses, and motor buses in Muni's fleet, built between 1896 and 1999.
