= Pier 70 (San Francisco) =

Pier in southeast San Francisco, California

Coordinates: 37°45′35.34″N 122°23′0.87″W

Old shipyard building at Pier 70, San Francisco, California, US

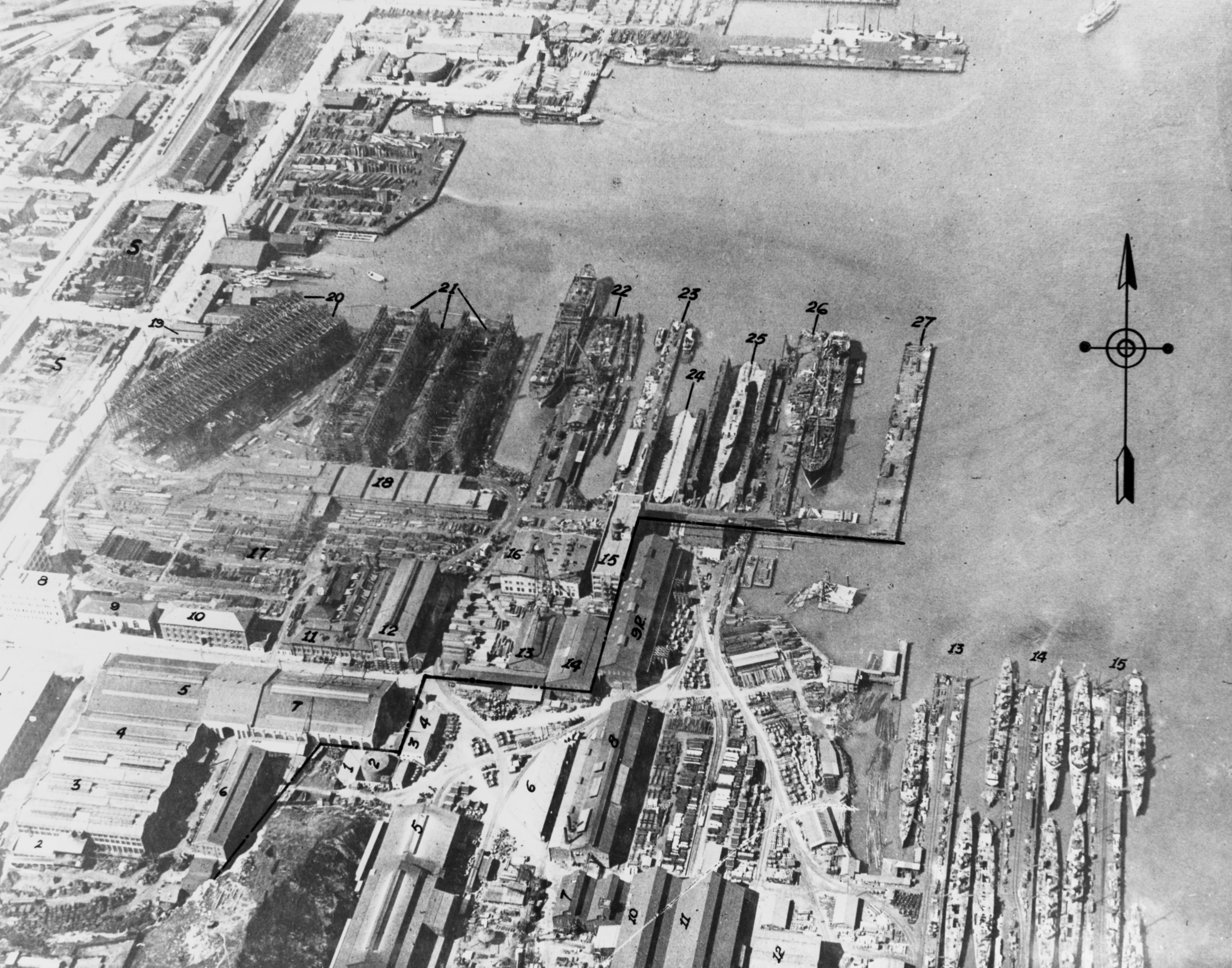
Pier area c. 1918, looking north to Union Iron Works.

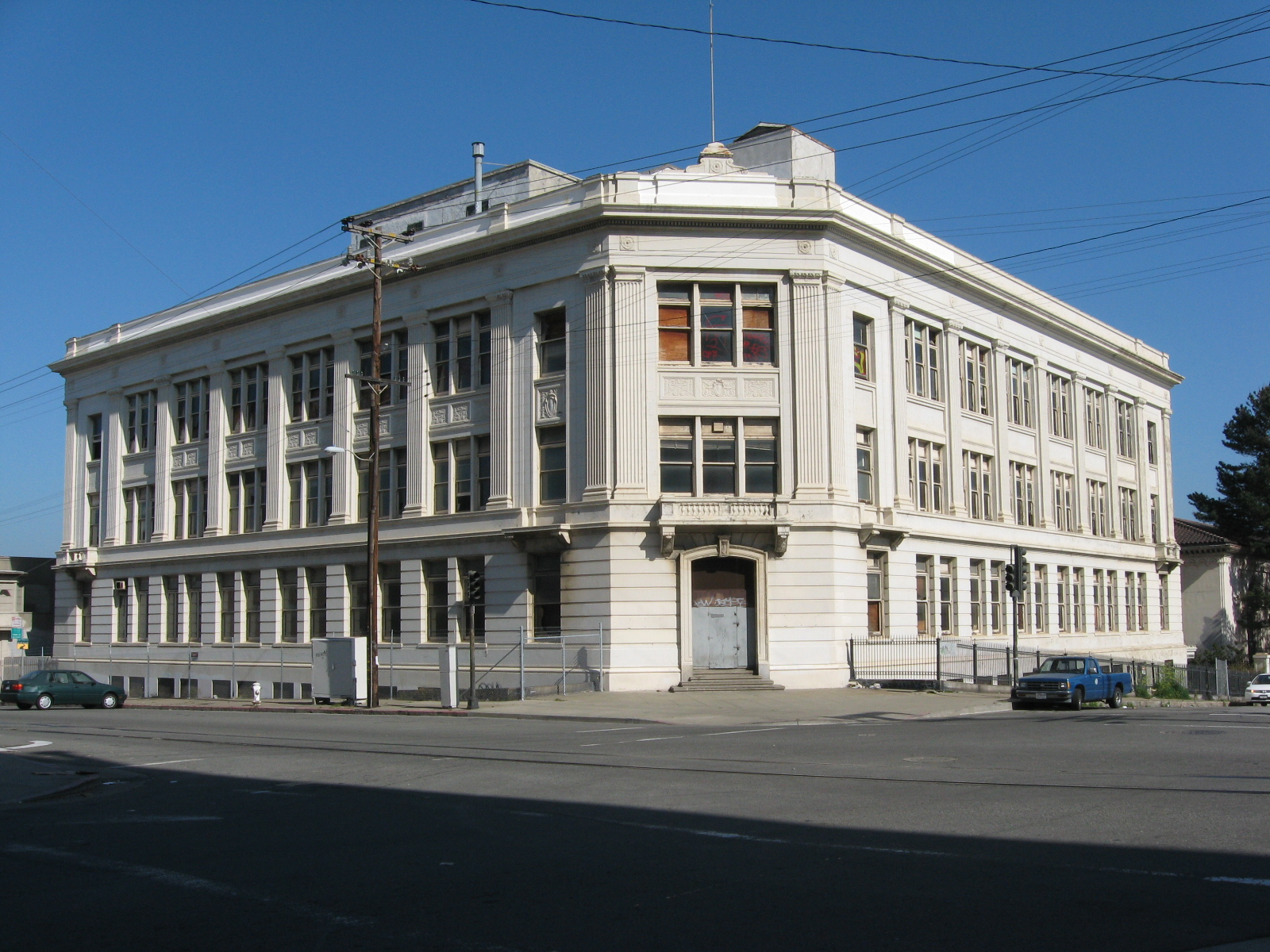
Bethlehem Steel's Administration building.

Pier 70 drydock, October 2020

Pier 70 in San Francisco, California, is a historic pier in San Francisco's Potrero Point neighborhood, home to the Union Iron Works and later to Bethlehem Shipbuilding. It was one of the largest industrial sites in San Francisco during the two World Wars. Today, it is among the best-preserved 19th century industrial complexes west of the Mississippi River.

== Physical plant ==
The pier is 65 acres (0.26 km^{2}) in size.

== History ==
The area around Pier 70 has been used for shipbuilding since the California Gold Rush. Since becoming home to the Union Iron Works in 1883, Pier 70 has been occupied by a variety of industrial concerns, including the Pacific Rolling Mills, Risdon Iron & Locomotive, Kneass Boat Works, Union Iron Works, Bethlehem Shipbuilding, and BAE Systems.

After Bethlehem acquired Union Iron Works in 1905, the pier also housed Bethlehem Shipbuilding Corporation's administrative offices in Building 101.

Bethlehem Steel sold their holdings in the area to the Port of San Francisco in 1980.

In the 1990s, the Eureka Dry Dock, former USS Steadfast (AFDM-14), was acquired by BAE Systems and is remains in use at the Pier.

=== Early beginnings and industrial boom ===
Pier 70, situated on San Francisco's eastern waterfront, has played a major role in the city's industrial evolution since its establishment in the mid-19th century. Originally developed during the California Gold Rush era to support San Francisco's growing population and economy, Pier 70 initially served as a shipbuilding hub. The Union Iron Works, founded in 1884 on the site that would become Pier 70, emerged as a leading industrial employer in the region.

=== The World Wars and industrial expansion ===
Pier 70's significance increased during World War II when it was acquired by Bethlehem Steel Corporation. It was then transformed into one of the West Coast's largest shipyards, producing numerous ships such as the Liberty ships crucial to the Allied war effort.

=== Post-War decline and redevelopment ===
Following World War II, Pier 70 experienced a decline in shipbuilding activity, mirroring broader shifts in the industrial landscape. By the 1970s, the area faced neglect and decay as heavy industrial operations dwindled. However, efforts to preserve Pier 70's historical significance gained traction, leading to collaborative initiatives between the Port of San Francisco and private developers to revitalize the site.

== Current state and development ==
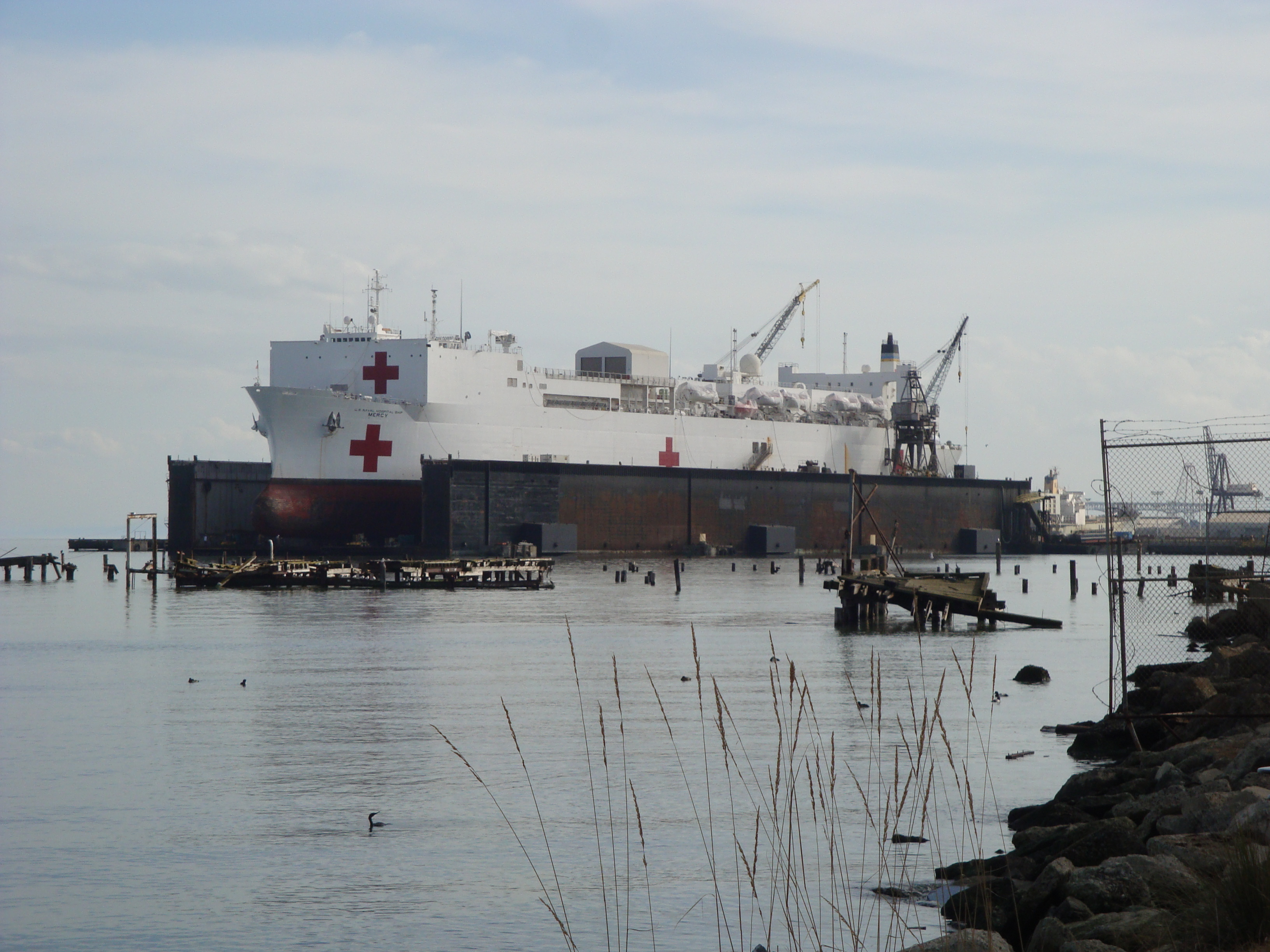
USNS Mercy at the Pier 70 BAE dry dock in 2010

As of Jan 3, 2017, the facility is operated by Puglia Engineering, Incorporated, who operate 2 other ship repair facilities in Washington State. Puglia Engineering purchased the facility from BAE Systems Ship Repair in January 2017. The two dry docks were formerly operated by BAE Systems San Francisco Ship Repair, employing approximately 200 people.

Most of the pier's buildings have been unoccupied since the decline of shipbuilding in the area. However, some of the pier's historic buildings are still used; one is used for artist studios.

In 2015, the Port of San Francisco started planning to redevelop the pier for mixed commercial and residential use in partnership with Orton Development, Incorporated and Forest City Development. The redevelopment was expected to include roughly a thousand housing units and two million square feet of office space. In 2013, plans included a "Crane Cove Park" that would feature the historic cranes in the northern part of the pier complex.

A $120 million restoration and rehabilitation effort for the eight buildings in the pier's historic core began in 2015 and is expected to complete in 2017.

Several of the buildings are used as a large-scale event venue operated by Pier 70 Partners.

=== Current developments and future plans ===
==== Neighborhood ====
Pier 70 is situated on the eastern corridor of San Francisco, in the heart of the Dogpatch neighborhood.

==== Current developments ====
In 2026, redevelopment work continued under a partnership between the Port of San Francisco and Brookfield Properties on 28-acres of Pier 70. The development plan includes mixed-use zoning for retail, office, and 1100 to 2150 residential units, alongside 6.5 acres of open space and preserved historic structures.

The project master plan designates specific parcels for new residential construction and office use. It also requires the rehabilitation of historic structures, including the Union Iron Works Machine Shop, and the creation of waterfront parks such as Crane Cove Park.

Furthermore, the 1.5-acre Parcel K North, located within the larger Pier 70, is in the process of redevelopment. It has been sold to TMG Partners and Presidio Bay Ventures and is expected to be developed for housing. The site is planned to "contain a 65-foot tall, 377,506 square foot mixed use building with 245 for-sale residential units over ground floor amenity and retail spaces [...including] a 20th Street/Illinois Street Plaza and improvements to Michigan Street."

==== Future prospects ====
Community groups, including the Dogpatch Neighborhood Association, have advocated for the inclusion of cultural spaces and local hiring requirements in the redevelopment plan.

== Historic buildings ==
Potrero Point is eligible for the National Register as a historic district for its contribution to three war efforts (Spanish–American War, World War I & World War II) and because of the 19th-century buildings that remain. Some of the buildings are individually eligible for landmarking for their architectural and historic merit. Worthy of historical landmark status is the 1917 Frederick Meyer Renaissance Revival Bethlehem office building, the Charles P. Weeks designed 1912 Power House #1, the 1896 Union Iron Works office designed by Percy & Hamilton, and the huge 1885 Machine shops.
