= J Train =

J Train is a name for two rapid transit lines:

- J/Z (New York City Subway service)
- J Church, San Francisco
