= 24th Street station =

24th Street station may refer to:

- 24th Street station (GRTC Pulse), an under-construction bus-rapid transit station in Richmond, Virginia
- 24th Street (PTC station), a former Subway–Surface Streetcar station in Philadelphia, Pennsylvania
- 24th Street station (Philadelphia), a former Baltimore and Ohio station in Philadelphia, Pennsylvania
- 24th Street/Jefferson and 24th Street/Washington stations, a METRO light rail station in Phoenix, Arizona
- 24th Street (San Diego Trolley station), a San Diego Trolley station in San Diego, California
- 24th Street Mission (BART station), a BART station in San Francisco, California
- Church and 24th Street, a Muni station in San Francisco, California
