= San Jose and Santa Ynez station =

Muni Metro light rail stop in San Francisco

San Jose and Santa Ynez
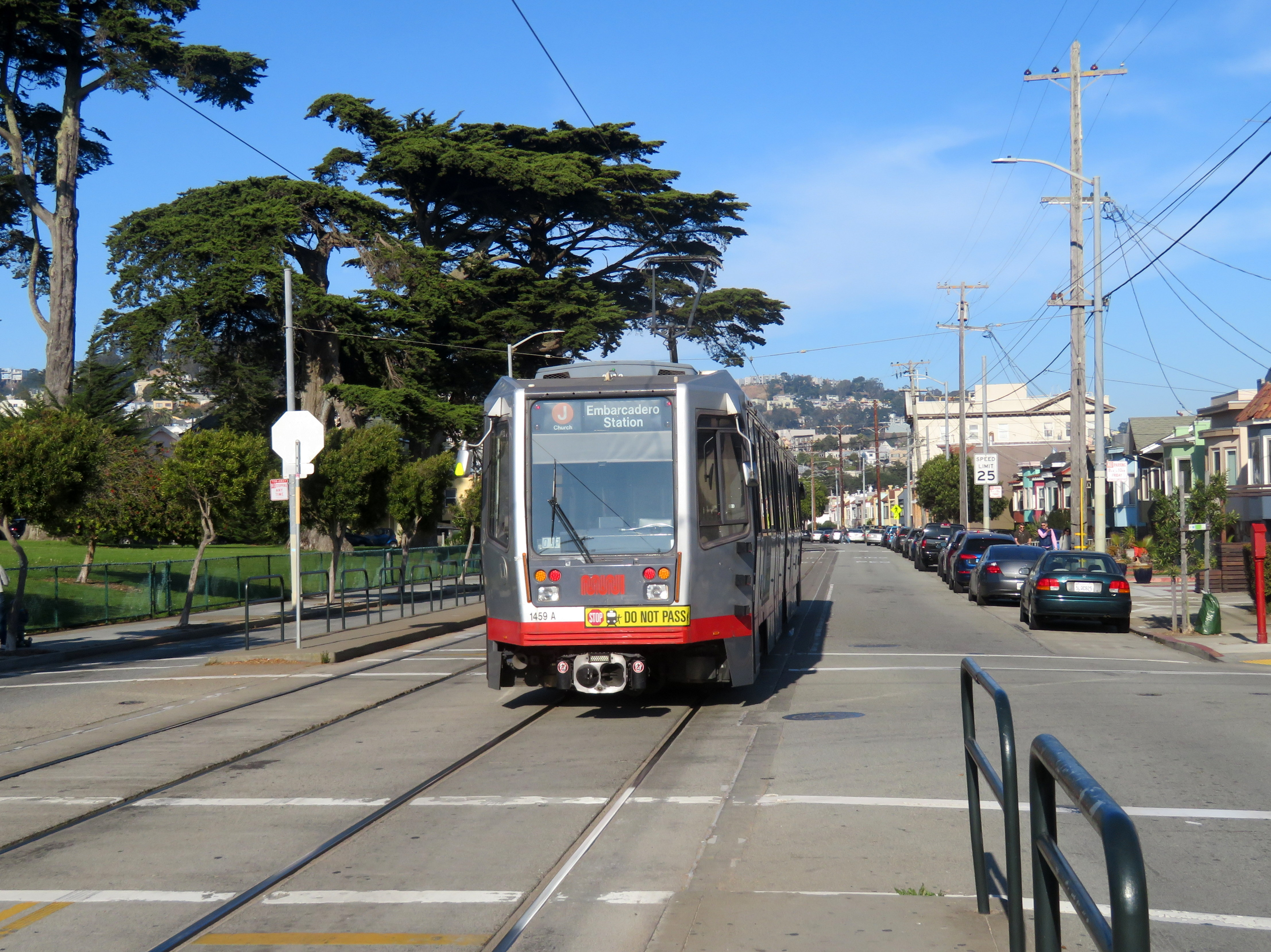
- Eastbound train leaving San Jose and Santa Ynez in November 2019

General information
- Location: San Jose Avenue at Santa Ynez Avenue; San Francisco, California
- Coordinates: 37.72578°N 122.44240°W
- Platforms: 2 side platforms
- Tracks: 2

Construction
- Accessible: No

History
- Opened: August 31, 1991

Services
Preceding station	Muni	Following station
San Jose and Ocean toward Balboa Park	J Church	San Jose and Santa Rosa toward Embarcadero
Location

San Jose and Santa Ynez station is a light rail stop on the Muni Metro J Church line, located in the Mission Terrace neighborhood of San Francisco, California adjacent to Balboa Park. The station has two short side platforms in the middle of San Jose Avenue (traffic islands) located before the intersection in each direction. The station is not accessible.

== History ==
J Church and N Judah trains began using the extension of the J Church line along San Jose Avenue for carhouse moves on August 31, 1991. Although these trips were open to passengers, the extension and its stops did not open for full-time J Church service until June 19, 1993.

In March 2014, Muni released details of the proposed implementation of their Transit Effectiveness Project (later rebranded MuniForward), which included a variety of stop changes for the J Church line. The inbound platform at Santa Ynez, currently less than the length of a single Muni Metro car, would be extended. In 2015, an SFMTA study recommended the addition of accessible "key stop" ramps between Santa Ynez and Santa Rosa, to be located at San Juan Avenue (inbound) and Nantucket Avenue (outbound). Planning for the J Church Safety and Accessibility Project began in 2022. The 2015-proposed key stop locations were deemed substandard, in part because they would be located separate from the regular platforms. Instead, the Santa Ynez boarding islands would be extended, with key stops at their outer end. The project was approved in October 2023, with most construction planned to take place in 2025–2027. The extended boarding islands were built in April–May 2026, with the ramps to be added later.
