= Mission Dolores Park =

City park in San Francisco, California

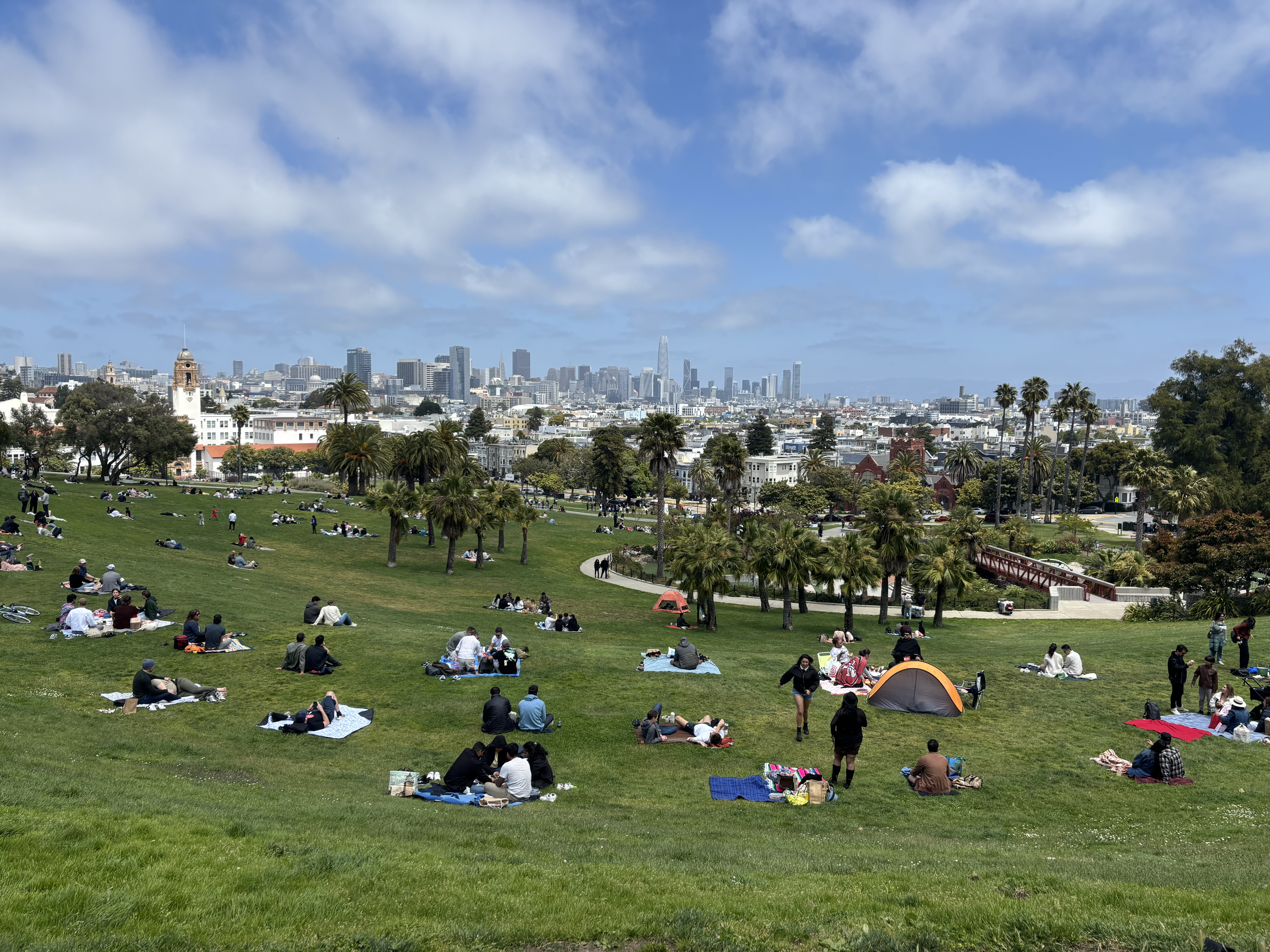
- View from the park in May 2025
- Interactive map of Mission Dolores Park
- Type: Municipal
- Location: San Francisco
- Coordinates: 37°45′35″N 122°25′34″W
- Area: 15.98 acres (6.47 ha)
- Established: 1906
- Operator: San Francisco Recreation & Parks Department
- Open: 6am to 10pm daily
- Public transit: Church and 18th Street and Right Of Way/20th St

Mission Dolores Park, often abbreviated to Dolores Park, is a city park in San Francisco, California. It is located two blocks south of Mission Dolores at the western edge of the Mission District.

Dolores Park is bounded by 18th Street on the north, 20th Street on the south, Dolores Street on the east and Church Street on the west. The northern end of Dolores Park is located directly across the street from Mission High School. On its eastern, southern and western sides, the park is surrounded by residential buildings of two to four stories, in various architectural styles. South of the park is a hillside area known as "Dolores Heights," while The Castro neighborhood is located a short distance to the west. The park's topography is characterized by a strong slope from the southwest down to the northeast, offering an unobstructed northeast-looking view of downtown San Francisco, in particular from the southwest corner.

Dolores Park offers several features including many tennis courts, a basketball court, a multi-purpose court, a soccer field, a pissoir, a children's playground, and a dog play area. The southern half of the park is also notable for its views of the Mission district, downtown, the San Francisco Bay and the East Bay. The Muni Metro J-Church streetcar line runs through the park along its western border.

The park lies east of Twin Peaks in the warm and sunny microclimate of the Mission neighborhood, which was named one of the coolest neighborhoods in the world in 2016. As of 2016, Dolores Park was attracting up to 7,000–10,000 people on a sunny weekend day.

== History ==
Native Americans of the Chutchui village of the Yelamu tribe inhabited the area prior to the arrival of Spanish missionaries, who founded nearby Mission Dolores in 1776.

The park site consists of two plots, Mission Blocks #86 and #87, formerly owned by Congregation Sherith Israel and Congregation Emanu-El and was used as a Jewish cemetery, which became inactive in 1894. The cemetery was moved to San Mateo County when San Francisco land became too valuable for the dead and burial within the city limits was prohibited. The graves were moved to Colma (via Southern Pacific railroad), where they still rest today at Hills of Eternity and Home of Peace Cemeteries.

San Francisco Jewish Cemetery

In 1903, over 1,000 property owners from the southern side of San Francisco formed the Mission Park Association, which introduced a ballot measure to buy the former Jewish cemetery area and turn it into a park. It passed by 73.9% later in the same year, initiating the creation of what was back then named "Mission Park". In 1905, the City of San Francisco bought the land for $291,350.

In 1906–07, the park served as a refugee camp for more than 1600 families made homeless by the 1906 San Francisco earthquake and fire. Camp life after the earthquake ended in the summer of 1908. Some people kept their temporary shacks as houses and a few still survive today scattered across western San Francisco. In 1917, the J-Church streetcar line, which runs along one side of the park, began service.

Until after World War II, the Mission District was largely inhabited by European Americans, which from the 1950s to the 1970s were replaced by an influx of Latino immigrants. Partly as a symbol of this transformation, on September 16, 1966, a replica of the “Mexican Liberty Bell”, presented by Mexican president Gustavo Díaz Ordaz, was installed in the park near a statue of Miguel Hidalgo, the father of Mexican independence, which had been erected four years earlier. The "Mexican Liberty Bell" (today located in the National Palace in Mexico City) is a church bell that Hidalgo rang in 1810 in the Mexican city of Dolores Hidalgo, in what became known as the "Cry of Dolores" (El Grito de Dolores) that launched the Mexican War of Independence. In 2014, the replica was relocated by around 25 feet during the renovations of Mission Dolores Park.

In subsequent decades, the park also became popular among LGBT residents from the nearby Castro district (an area near the park's south-west corner has been dubbed the "gay beach") and among young professionals who moved to the area to work at Internet tech companies. In 2009, the San Francisco Chronicle observed that "as the wide variety of park visitors indicates - from Latino families to young hipsters to Castro gays - it sits at the intersection of a number of San Francisco demographic groups. And it always has." Dolores Park has hosted political rallies, festivals, Aztec ceremonial dances, Cinco de Mayo celebrations, San Francisco Mime Troupe performances, and an annual "Hunky Jesus" competition on Easter by the Sisters of Perpetual Indulgence.

Dolores Park during the annual Dyke March

In March 2014, the San Francisco Recreation & Park Department began a two-stage $20.5 million renovation project made possible by the 2008 Clean & Safe Park Neighborhood Bond to upgrade the park. Community-driven meetings lead to the conceptual design of the improvement project. Input from local community members, neighbors, merchants, the San Francisco Recreation & Parks Department, the San Francisco Department of Public Works, and other major stakeholders shaped the final design. The park was fully reopened in January 2016 with a light-up event. To address trash issues in the park, a Leave No Trace campaign was also launched encouraging park users to "pack it in, pack it out." In the years up to 2016, according to a SF Rec & Parks spokesperson, "Dolores Park [had] seen an exponential increase in the number of visitors: On a sunny Saturday, it can host between 7,000 and 10,000 people."

According to a 2011 historical study commissioned by the city, "between 1967 and the present, Mission Park gradually acquired the vernacular name 'Dolores Park,' presumably in recognition of its association with both Mission Dolores and Dolores Street. Today, the name Mission Park has been completely superseded". The park's official name as of 2016, is "Mission Dolores Park".

In an informal annual tradition that has become known as the "Dolores Park Hill Bomb", hundreds of skateboarders gather on Dolores Street across from the park every July for an impromptu hill bombing event. There have been some injuries and at least one death associated with the event. The city has made repeated attempts to prevent the event from happening, e.g. by installing Botts dots in 2020, using kettling and mass arrests in 2023 and by blocking off streets and part of the park in 2024. However, skaters returned regardless.

== Facilities ==
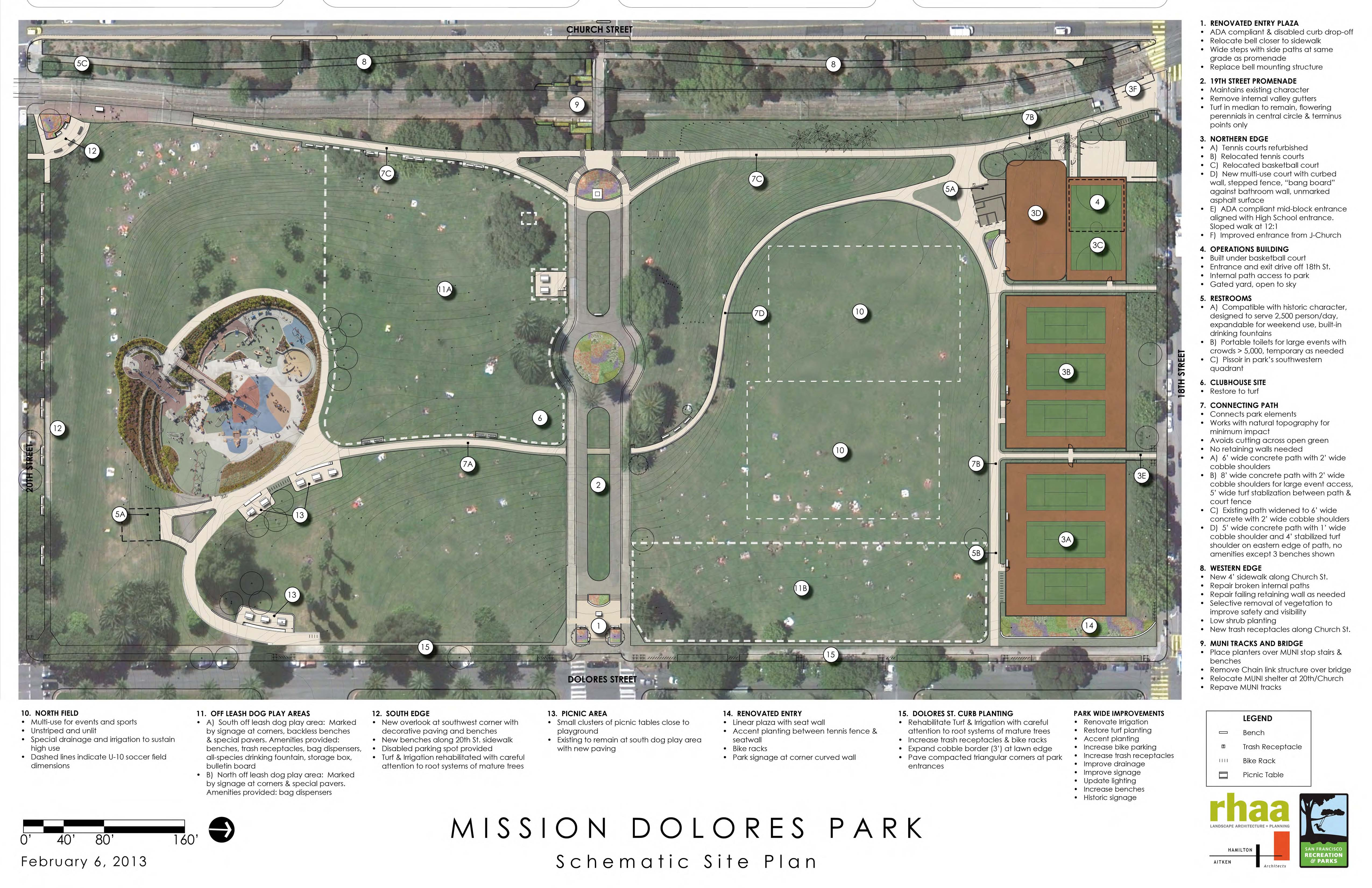
Mission Dolores Park Schematics

Dolores Park is served by the Church and 18th Street and Right Of Way/20th St stations of the J Church Muni Metro line, which operates in a private right-of-way on the park's west side. There are six tennis courts and one basketball court; two soccer fields, a playground, and a clubhouse with public restrooms. In 2010, it was announced that the park was to be closed throughout 2011 as part of massive renovations and a construction of a new playground. In spring 2012, the new Helen Diller Playground opened in the park, featuring two large slides, two swing sets, a granite climbing structure, a sand box and climbing nets. The playground is accessible to children with disabilities. As of 2014, there were plans for two off-leash dog play spaces in the park, but these plans were stalled by an environmental appeal from a local resident who felt that the space should be left open to allow more room for children to play, with the goal of reducing childhood obesity.

Up to 2016, more than $20 million were spent on the park's first upgrades in six decades, including the installation of additional toilets to address problems with public urination. Following the renovations, the park contains six tennis courts, a multi-use court, a basketball court, a sports field, the Helen Diller Playground, a pissoir, two off-leash dog areas, improved irrigation, and two public restroom areas.

== Gallery ==
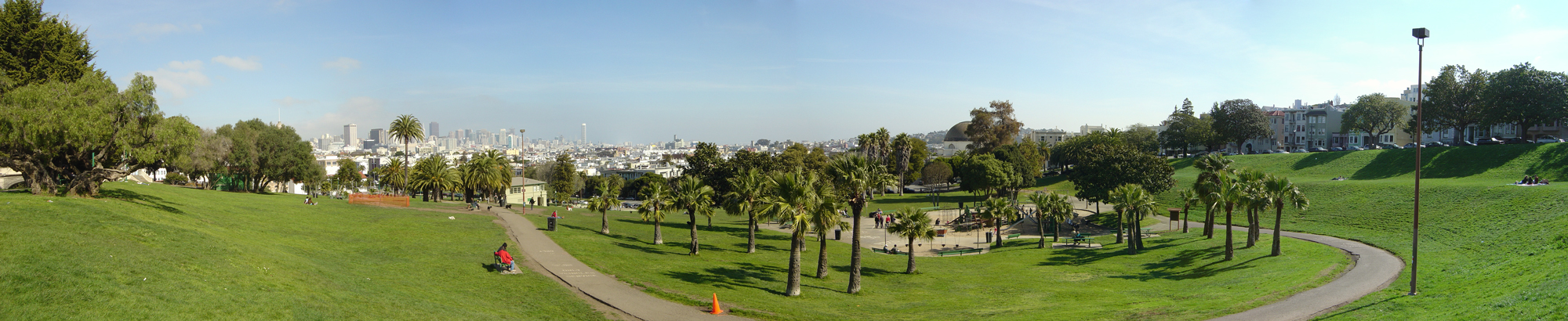
A panoramic view of Dolores Park, from the Muni stop near Twentieth and Church streets, with the San Francisco skyline in the distance

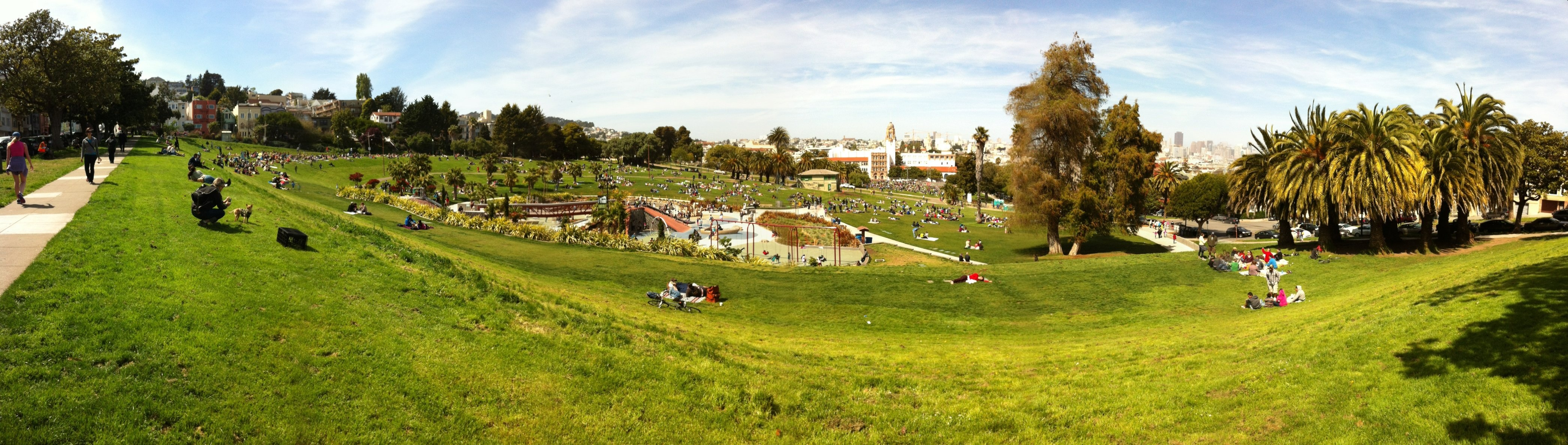
a panorama of the park

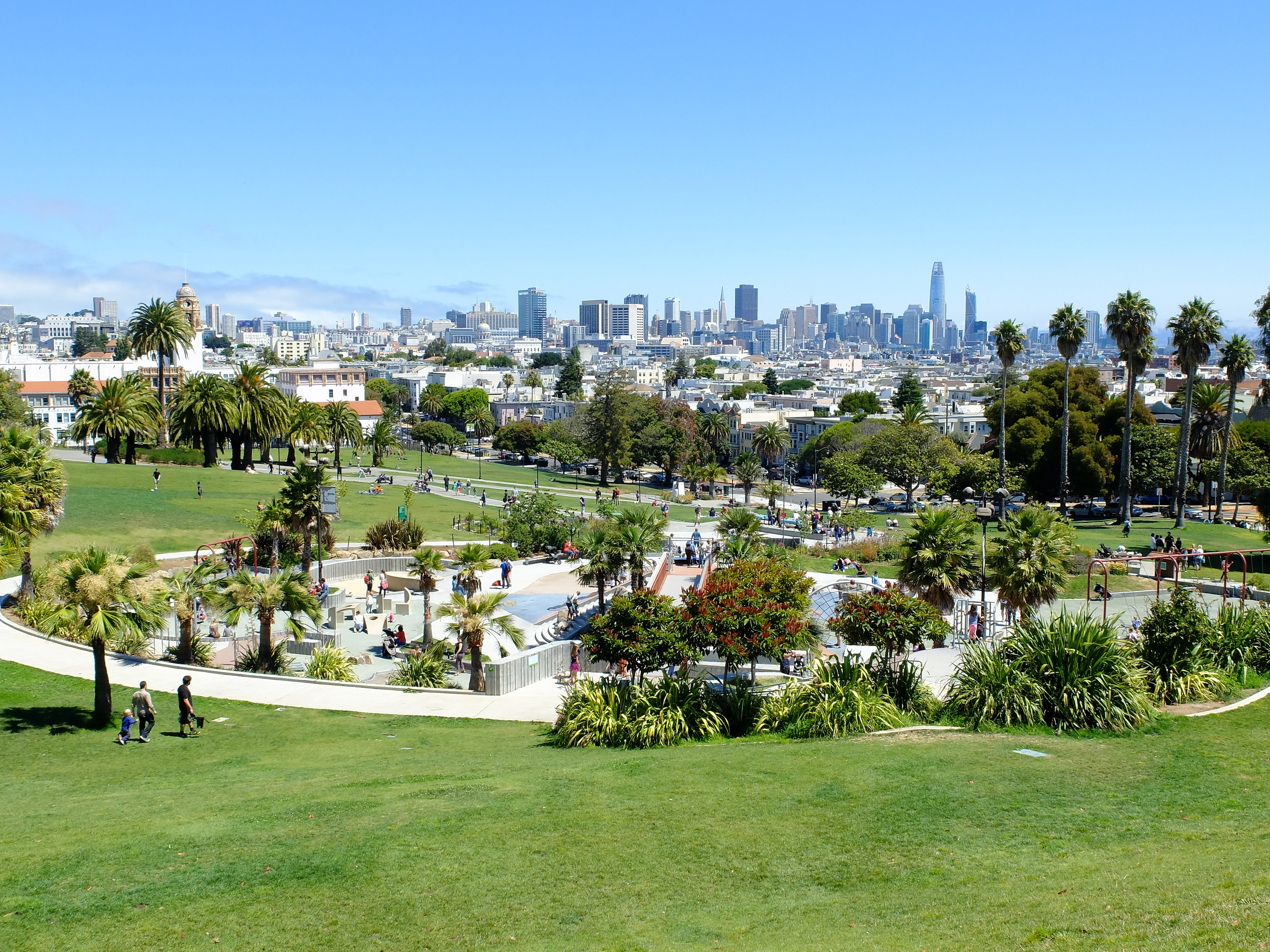
View of Dolores Park from the top, 2017

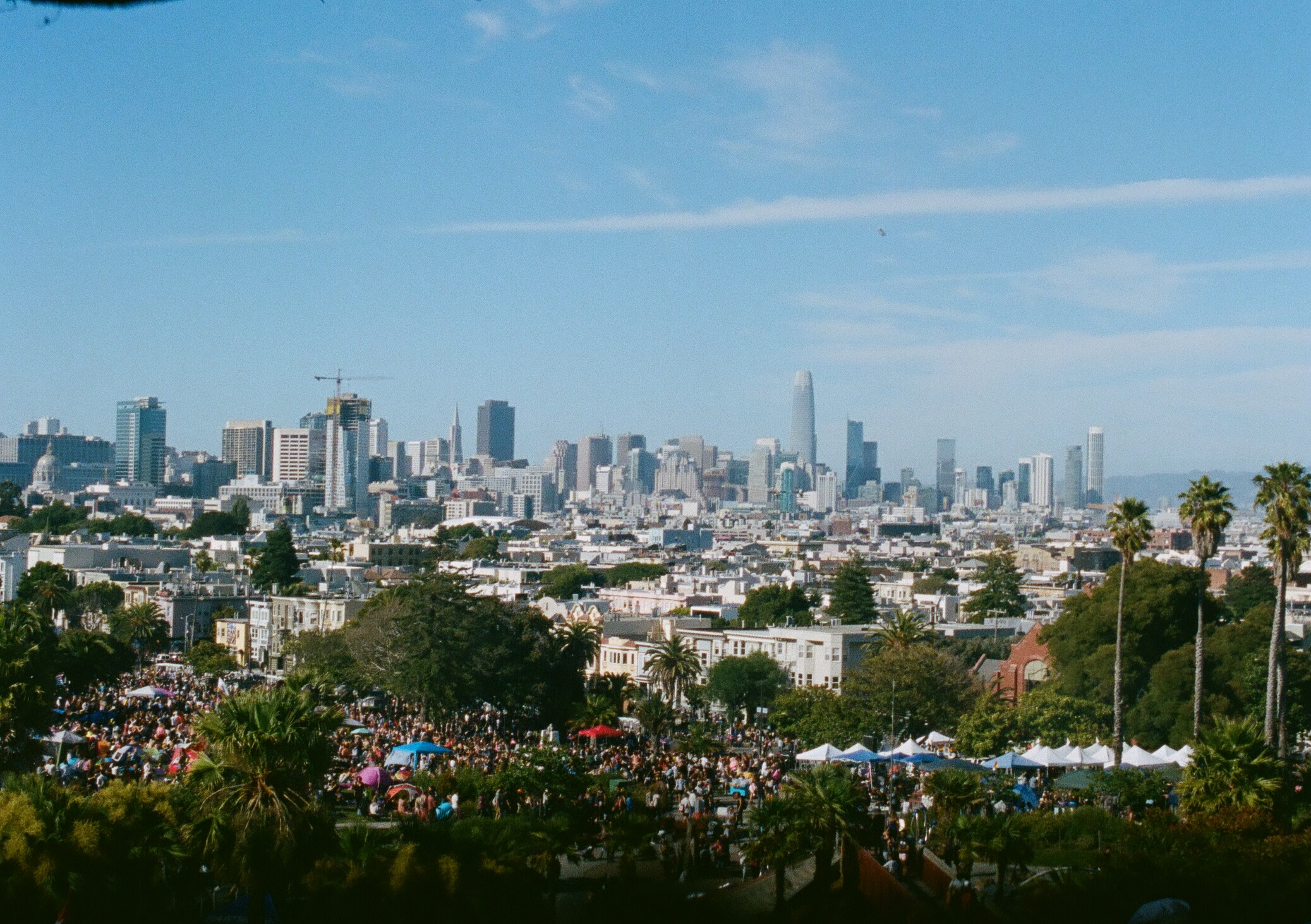
Downtown San Francisco skyline from Dolores Park, June 2019

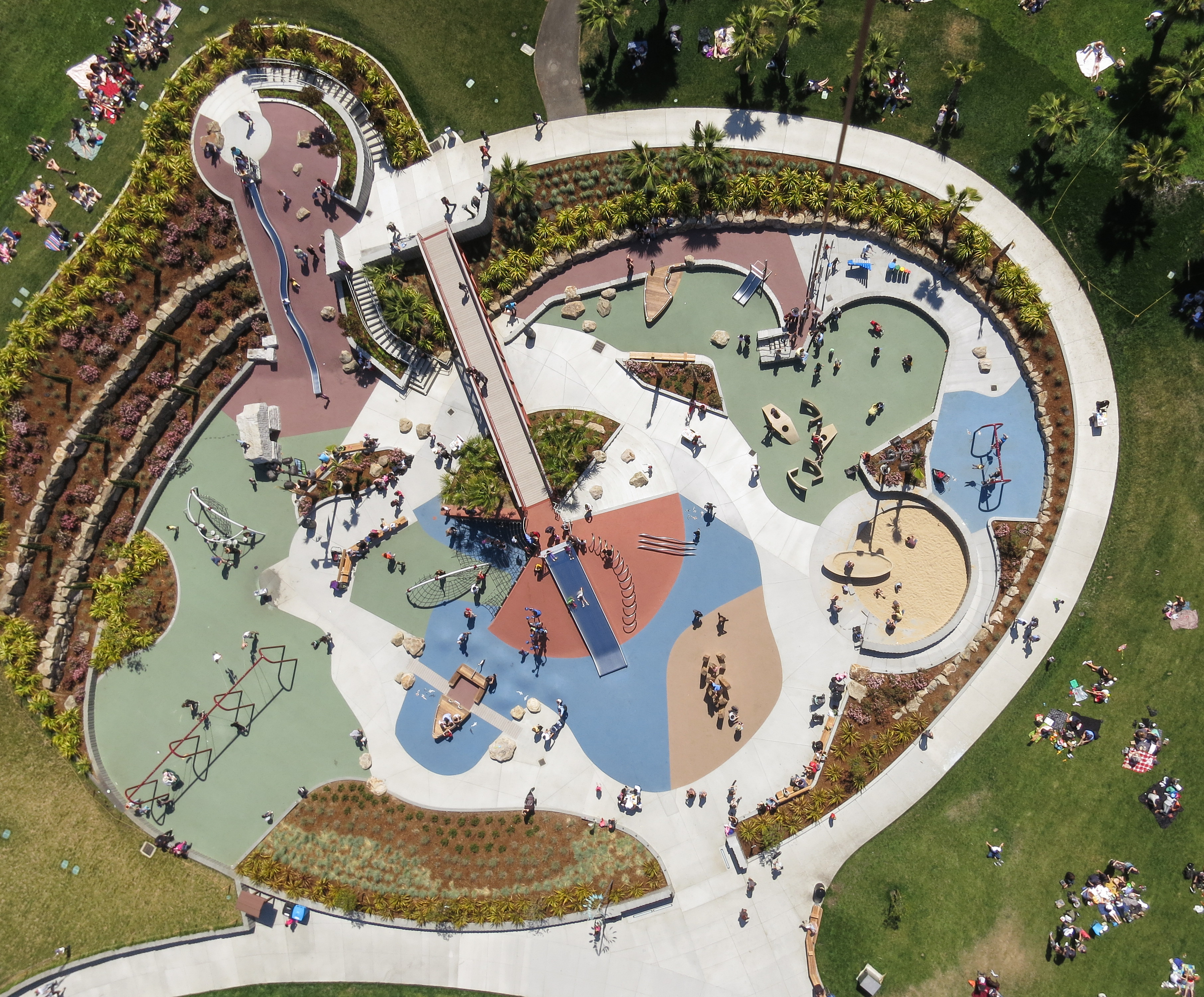
Aerial view of Dolores Park playground, 2012

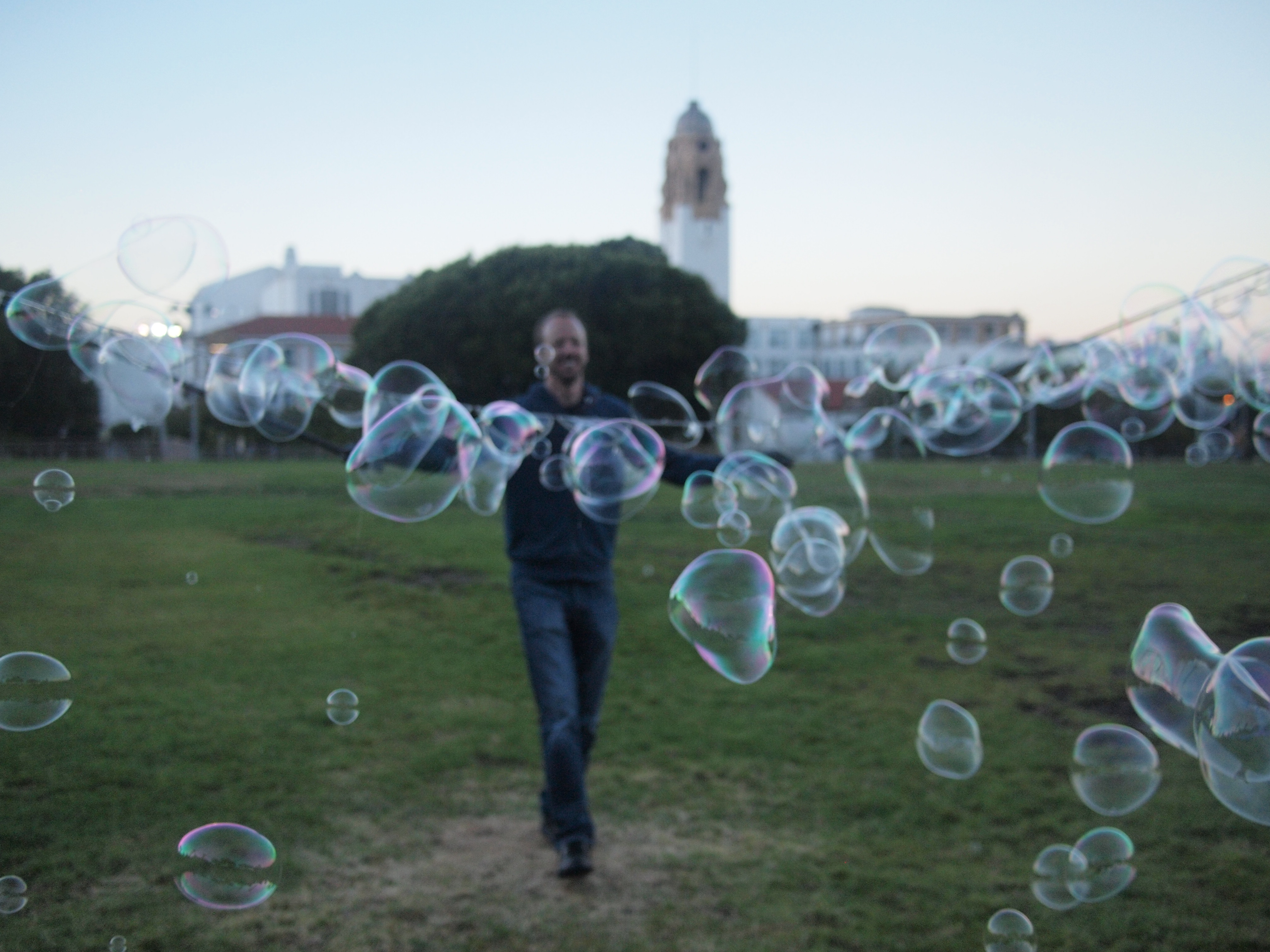
Man making large bubbles in Dolores Park. View of Mission High School in background

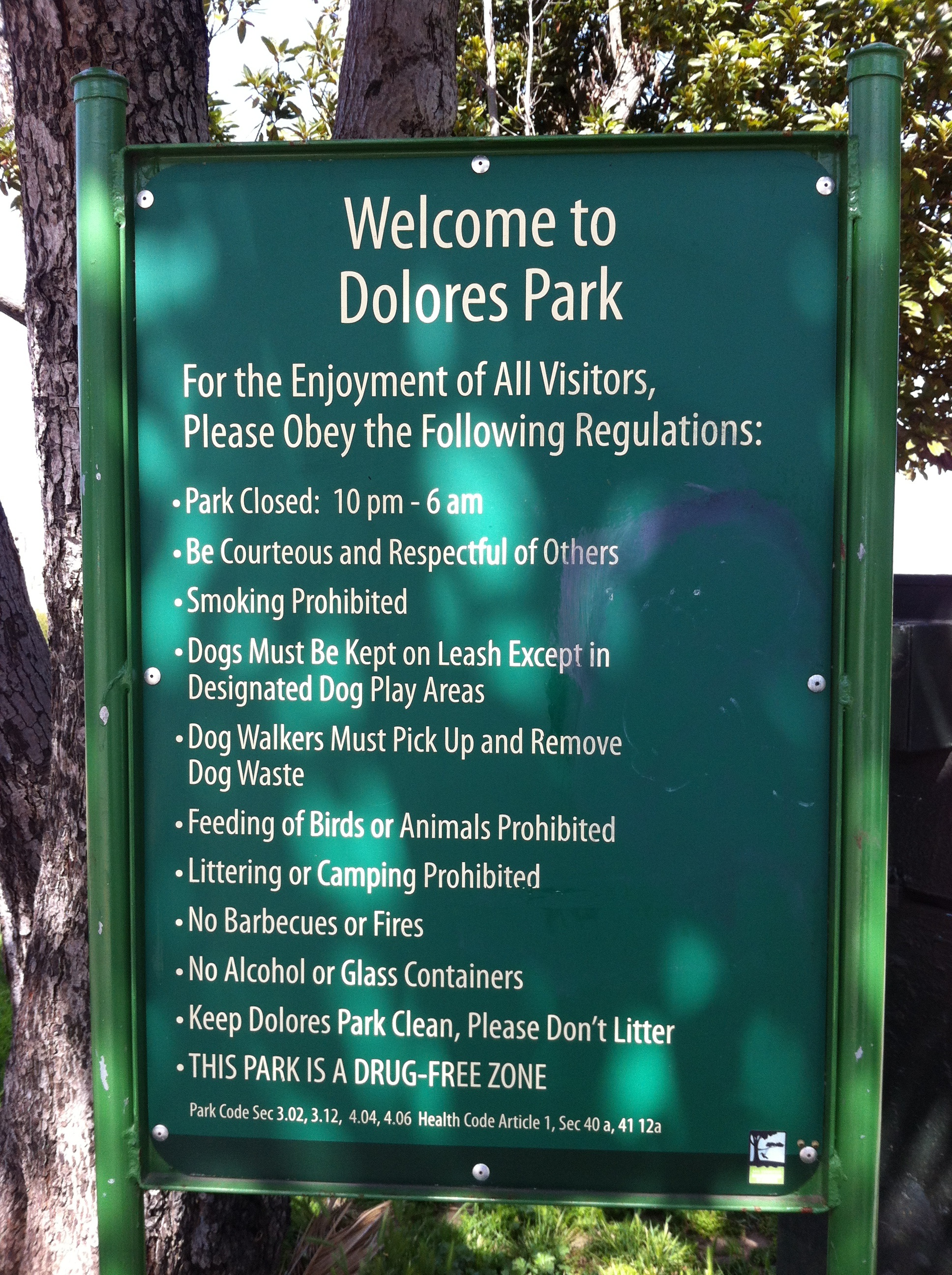
A sign denoting the rules of the park

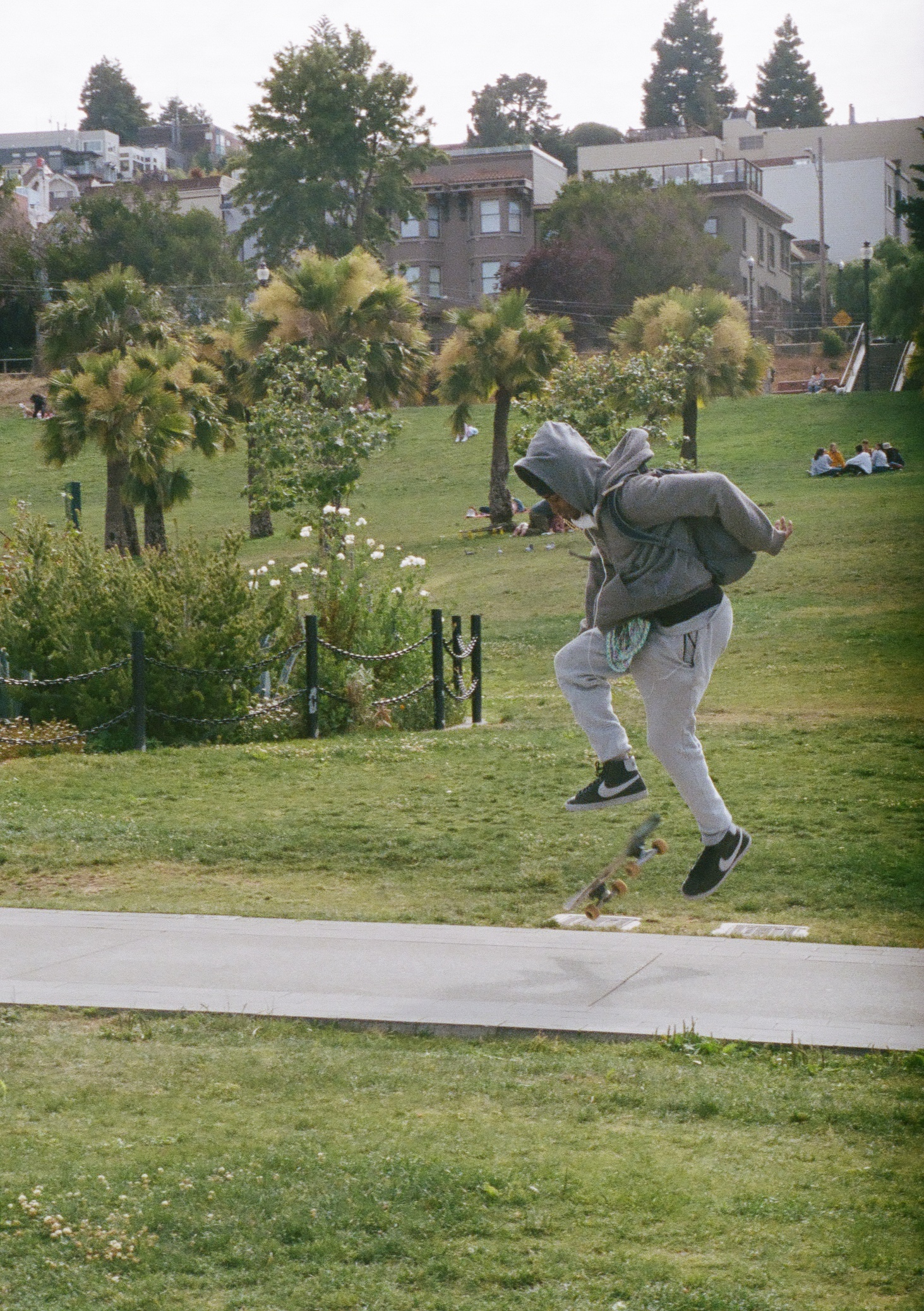
Skateboarder in Dolores Park, June 2019

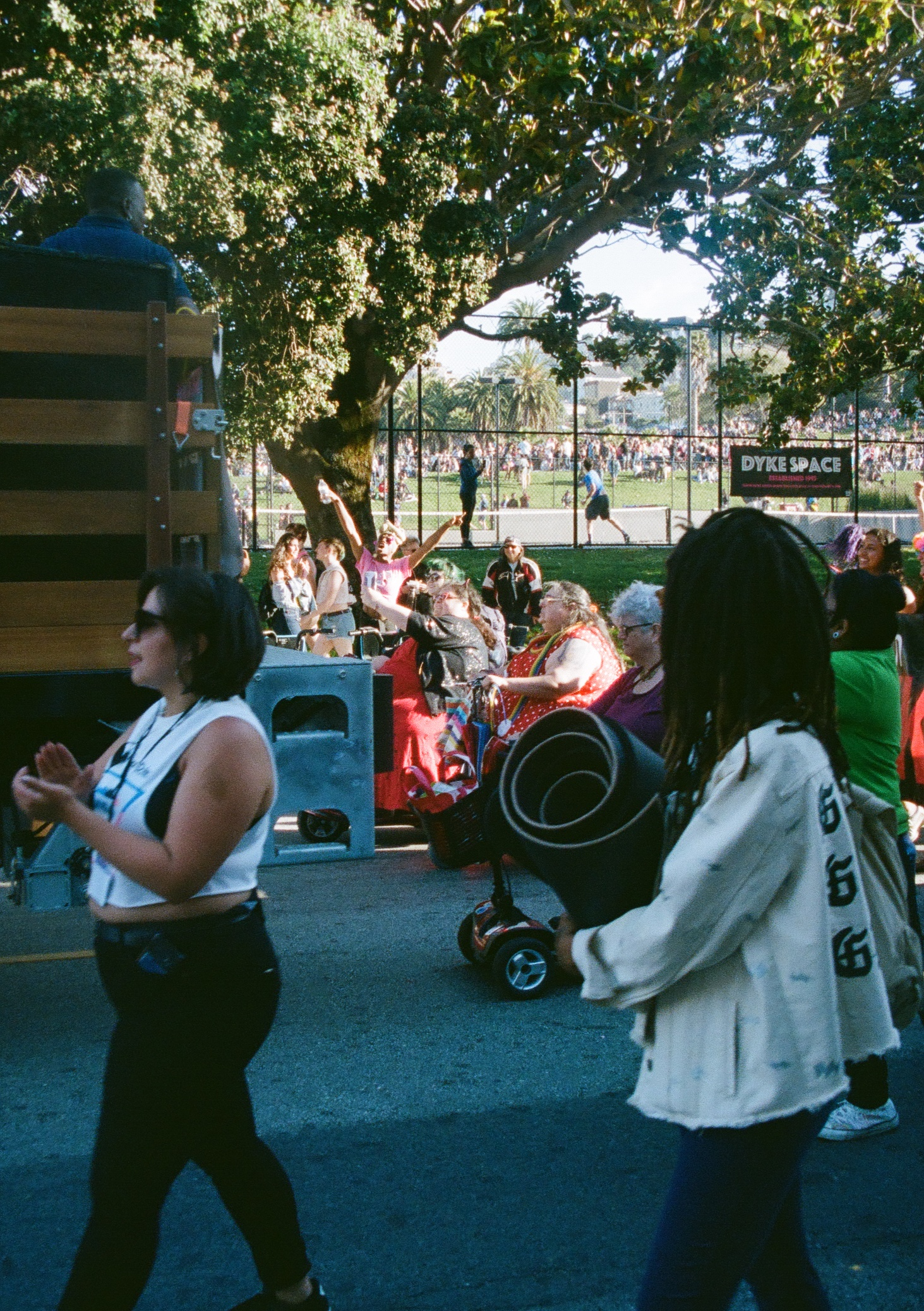
Dyke March parade, 2019

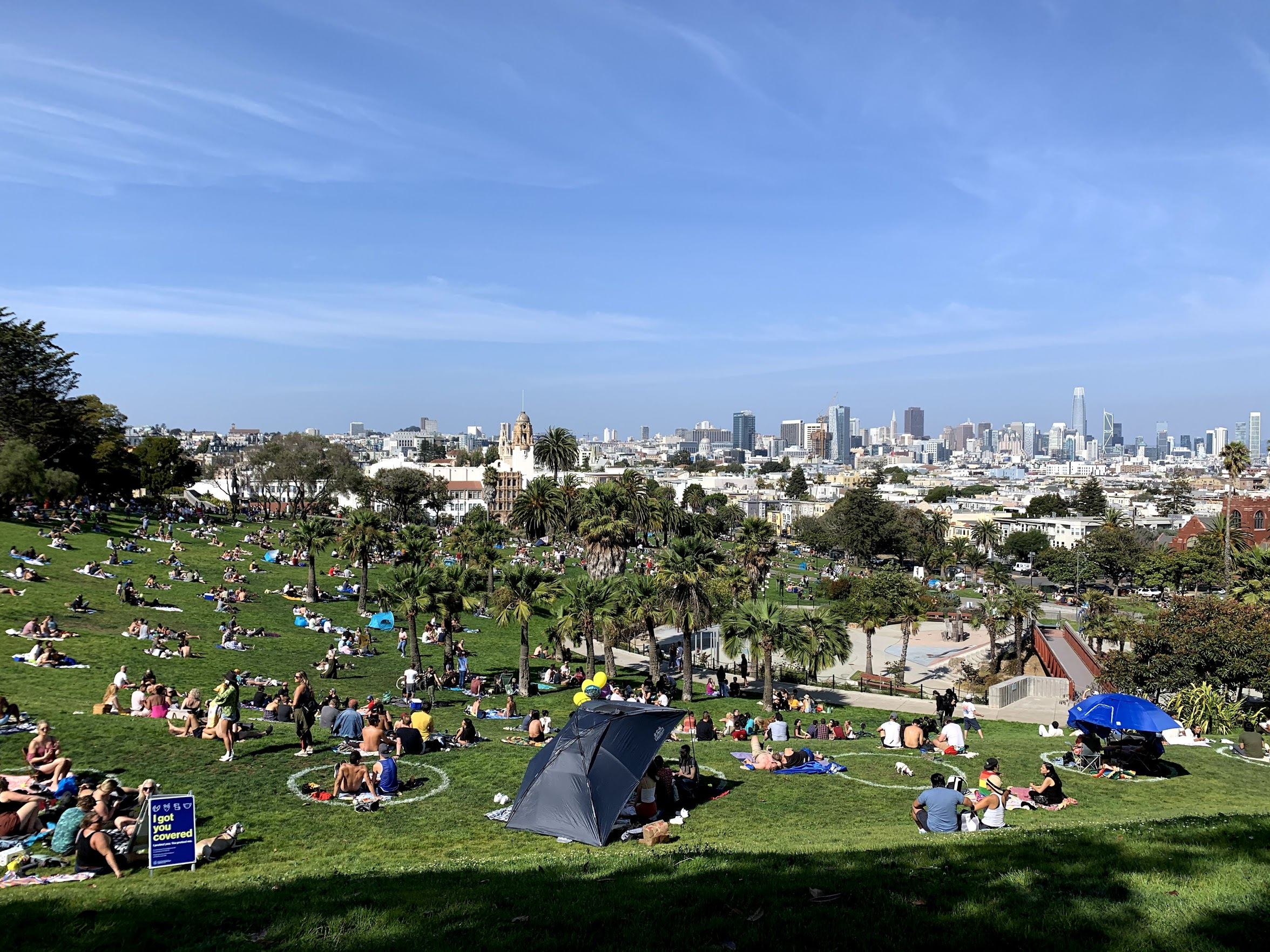
Dolores Park in September 2020 during the COVID-19 pandemic with circles for social distancing

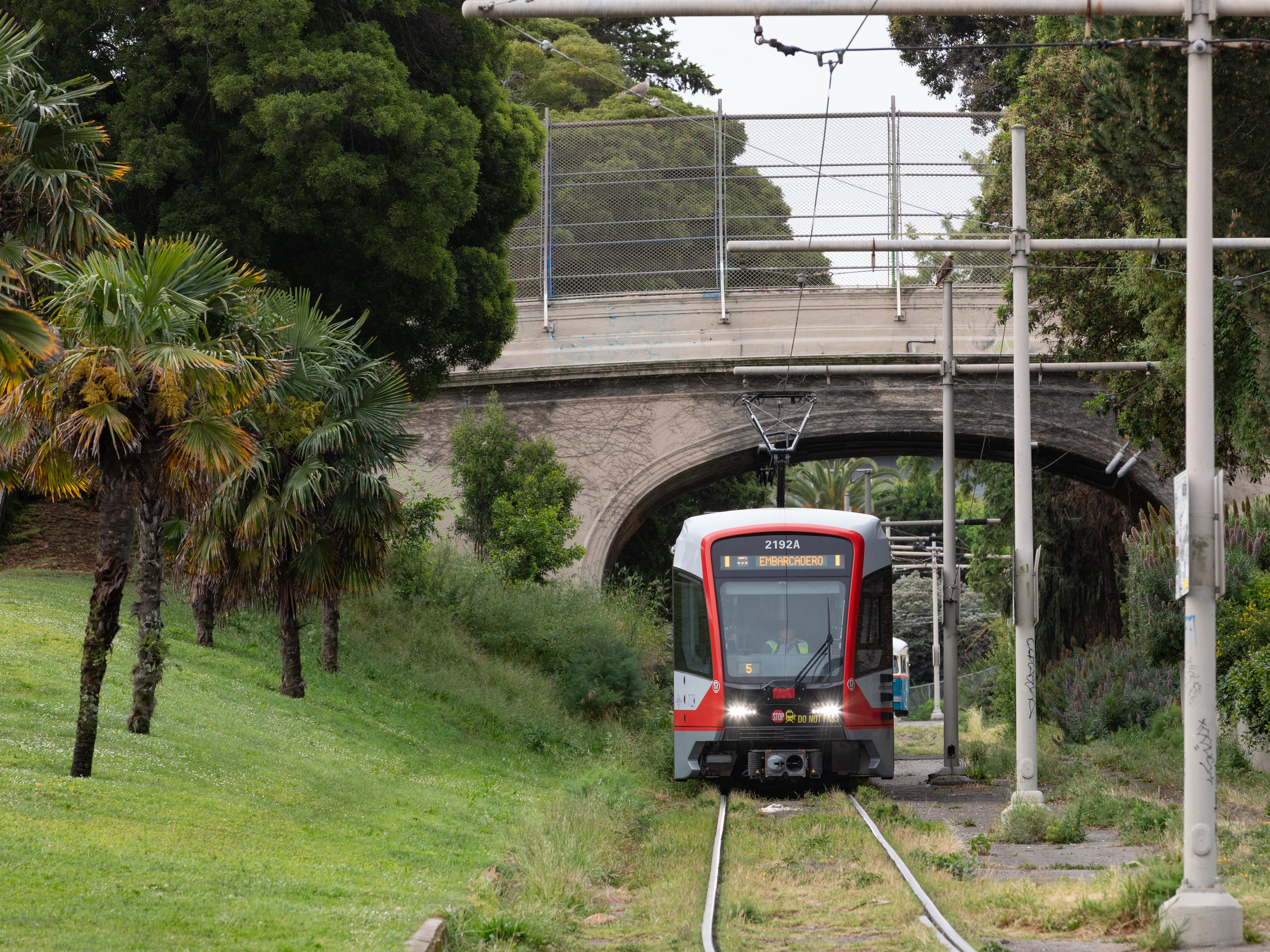
MUNI's J Church line runs through Mission Dolores Park.

== See also ==
- San Francisco City Parks
