= Right Of Way/Liberty station =

Light rail stop in San Francisco, California, US

Right Of Way/Liberty
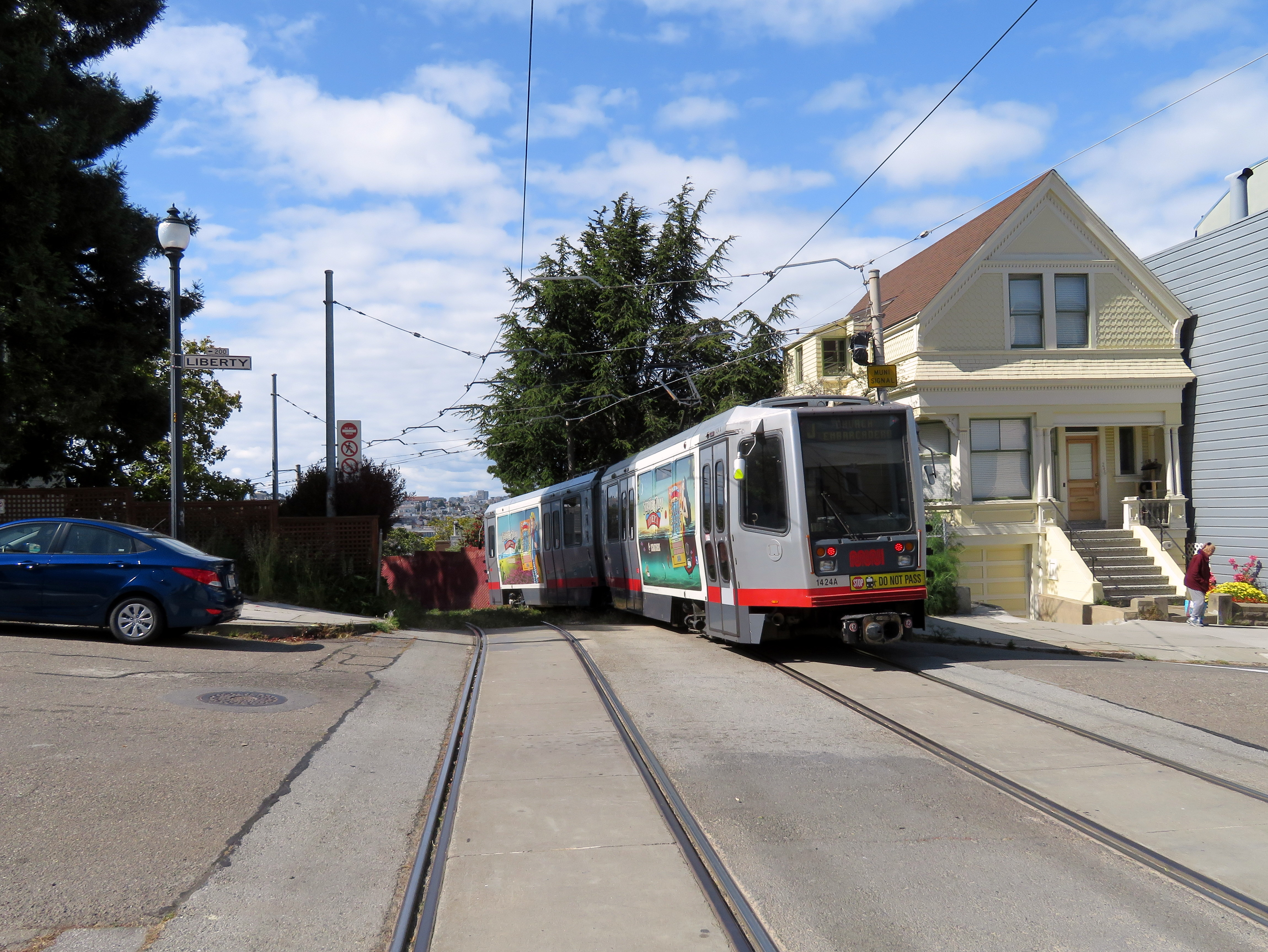
- Eastbound train at the right of way and Liberty in May 2018

General information
- Location: Liberty Street between Church and Dolores Streets; San Francisco, California
- Coordinates: 37°45′26″N 122°25′37″W
- Platforms: None, passengers wait on sidewalk
- Tracks: 2

Construction
- Accessible: No

History
- Opened: August 11, 1917

Services
Preceding station	Muni	Following station
Right Of Way/21st Street toward Balboa Park	J Church	Right Of Way/20th Street toward Embarcadero
Location

Right Of Way/Liberty station is a light rail stop on the Muni Metro J Church line, located in the Dolores Heights neighborhood of San Francisco, California. The stop, which opened with the line on August 11, 1917, is located on a short rail-only right of way that allows the line to avoid the steep hill on Church Street to the west. Due to the limited width of the right of way, the stop does not have platforms, trains stop in the middle of Liberty Street allowing passengers to step on or off trains. The stop is not accessible to people with disabilities.

In March 2014, Muni released details of the proposed implementation of their Transit Effectiveness Project (later rebranded MuniForward), which included a variety of stop changes for the J Church line. The stop at Liberty Street would be closed due to its proximity to the 20th Street and 21st Street stops. A more limited preliminary project announced in November 2019 will not close the stop due to the steep walk to nearby stops, but it may be closed later by the Rapid Project.
