= Church and 18th Street station =

Light rail stop in San Francisco, California, US

Church and 18th Street
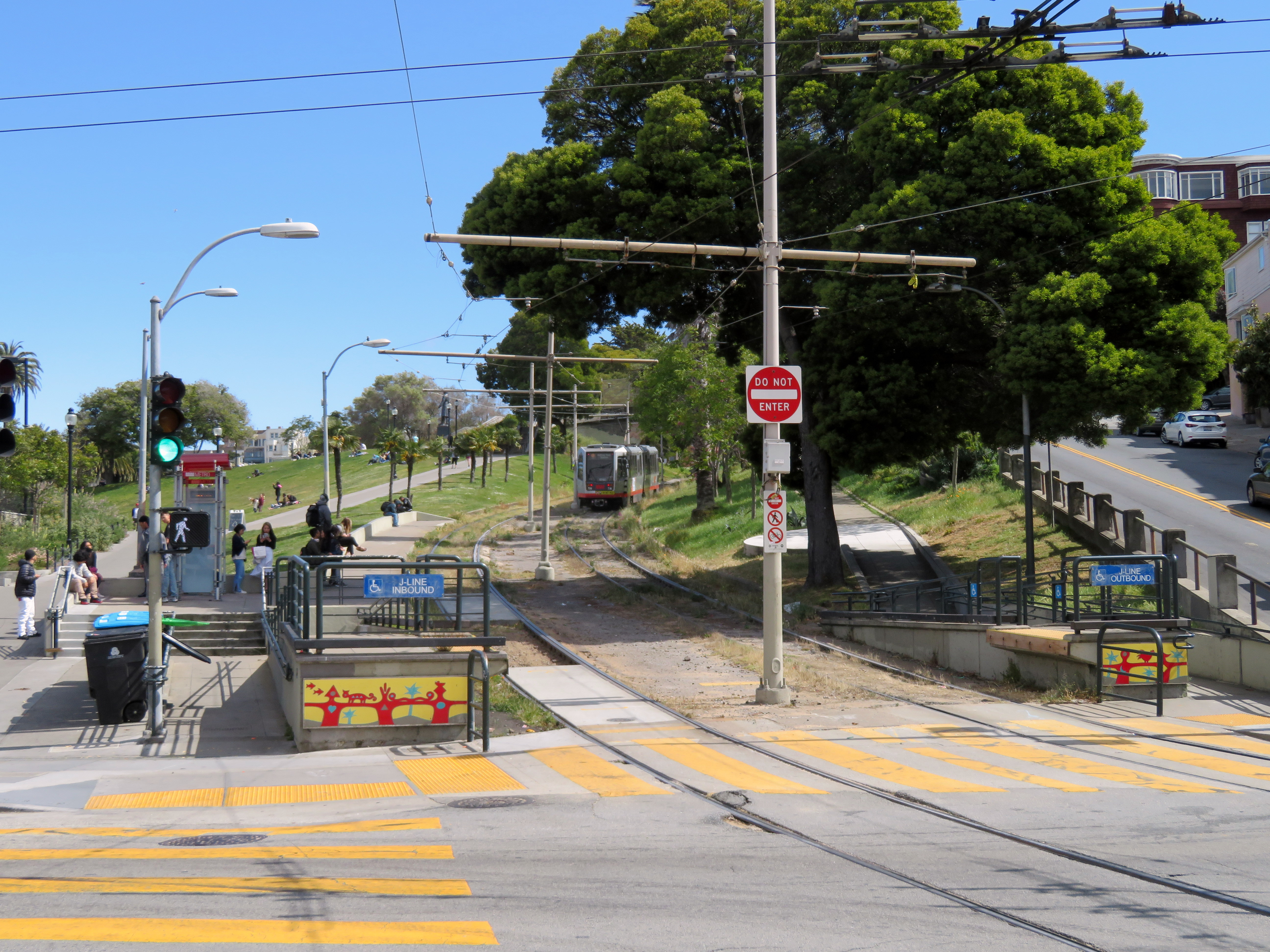
- Church and 18th Street station in May 2018

General information
- Location: Church Street at 18th Street; San Francisco, California
- Coordinates: 37°45′41″N 122°25′42″W
- Platforms: 2 side platforms
- Tracks: 2
- Connections: Muni: 33

Construction
- Accessible: Yes

History
- Opened: August 11, 1917
- Rebuilt: c. 1982

Services
Preceding station	Muni	Following station
Right Of Way/20th Street toward Balboa Park	J Church	Church and 16th Street toward Embarcadero
Location

Church and 18th Street station (also known as Right Of Way/18th Street) is a light rail stop on the Muni Metro J Church line, located in the northwest corner of Dolores Park in San Francisco, California. The stop opened with the line on August 11, 1917. The eastbound (inbound) platform is located inside Dolores Park on Muni's right of way; the westbound (outbound) platform is a traffic island on Church Street. Mini-high platforms providing access to people with disabilities are located inside the park next to 18th Street.

The stop is also served by bus route 33 plus the J Bus which provides service along the J Church line during the early morning when trains do not operate.

In March 2014, Muni released details of the proposed implementation of their Transit Effectiveness Project (later rebranded MuniForward), which included a variety of stop changes for the J Church line. Under that proposal, the westbound platform would be moved inside Dolores Park opposite the eastbound platform.
