= Church station (Muni Metro) =

Underground light rail station in San Francisco

Church
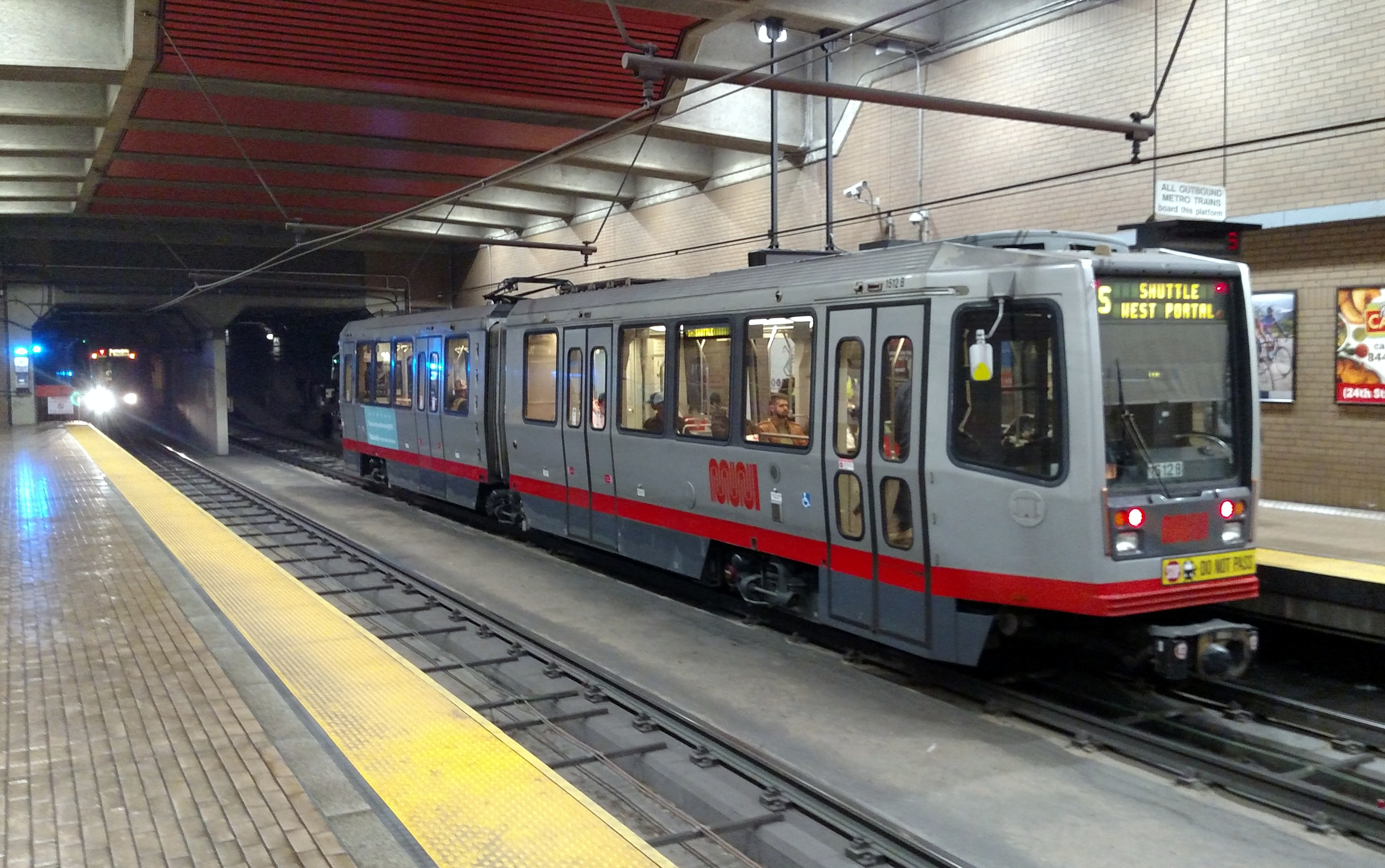
- S Shuttle train at Church station in December 2017

General information
- Location: Market Street at Church Street and 14th Street; San Francisco, California
- Coordinates: 37°46′4.13″N 122°25′44.64″W
- Owner: San Francisco Municipal Transportation Agency
- Line: Market Street subway
- Platforms: 2 side platforms (underground); 4 side platforms (surface)
- Tracks: 2 (Muni Metro, underground); 2 (Muni Metro, surface); 2 (historic streetcar, surface)
- Connections: Muni: 22, 37

Construction
- Structure type: Underground
- Accessible: Yes
- Architect: Reid & Tarics Associates

History
- Opened: June 11, 1980

Services
Preceding station	Muni	Following station
Castro toward Balboa Park	K Ingleside	Van Ness toward Embarcadero
Castro toward SF Zoo	L Taraval	Van Ness toward Embarcadero
Castro toward San Jose and Geneva (Balboa Park)	M Ocean View	Van Ness toward Embarcadero
Castro toward West Portal	S Shuttle	Van Ness toward Embarcadero
At surface stops
Market and Sanchez toward 17th Street and Castro	F Market & Wharves	Market and Dolores / Market and Buchanan toward Jones and Beach
Church and 16th Street toward Balboa Park	J Church	Church and Duboce toward Embarcadero
Location

Church station or Church Street station is a Muni Metro light rail station in San Francisco, California. It is located at the six-way intersection of Market Street, Church Street and 14th Street in the Duboce Triangle neighborhood.

== Station layout ==
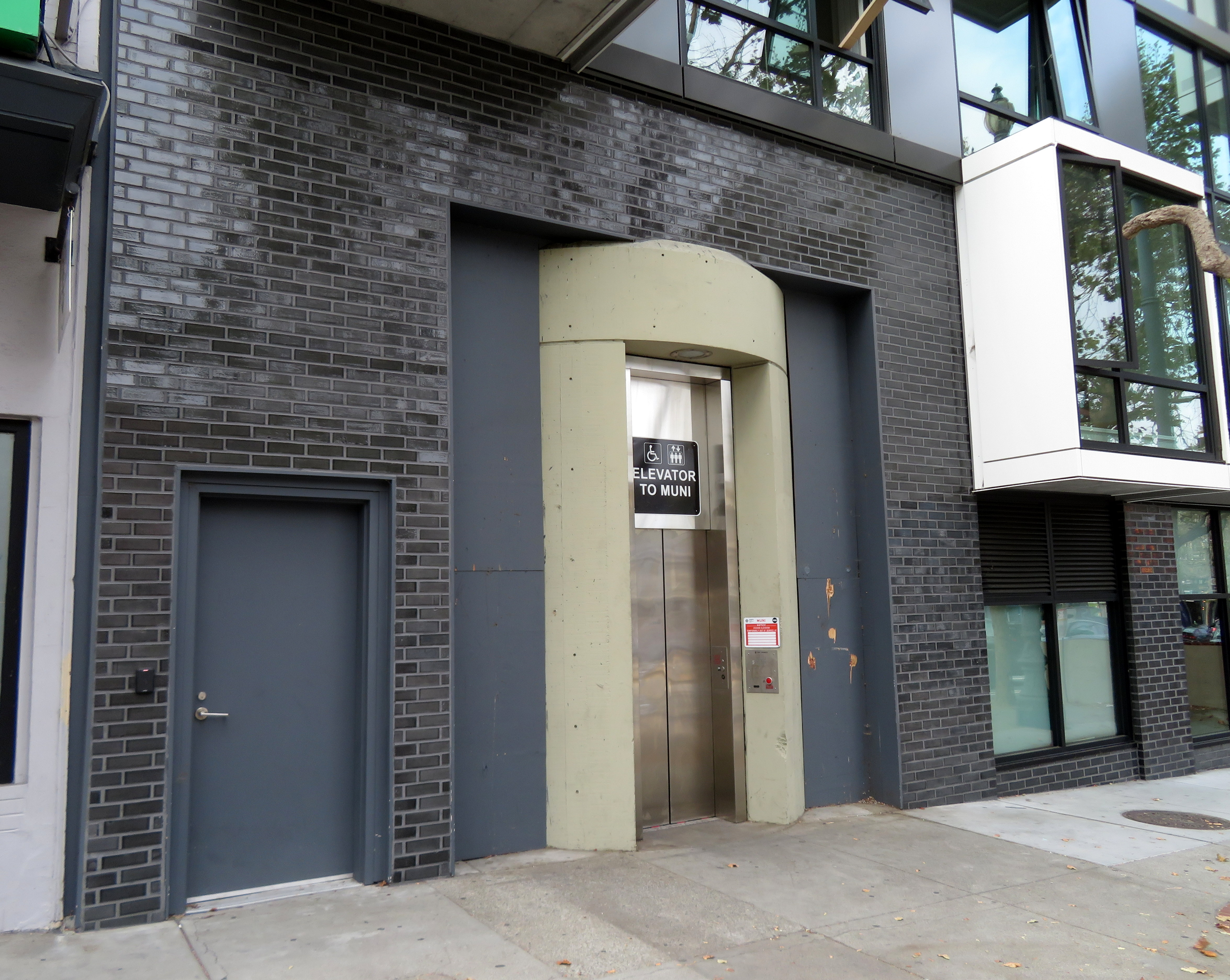
The street-level elevator entrance

The station consists of two side platforms next to the tracks on the second level down with the concourse mezzanine level overlooking it. At both Church Street station and Castro Street station, there is only one stairway on each side of Market Street leading into the station. (All other stations on the Market Street subway have entrances spread out along the length of the station.) One of these entrances is located on the northwest corner of Market and 14th Street, and the other is on the southwest corner of Market and Church Street. The street elevator is on the north side of Market Street west of 14th Street. Originally freestanding, it was incorporated in the façade of an apartment building constructed in 2017–2020.

The J Church line, which enters and exits the Market Street subway tunnel in a portal near the station, connects to this station at two surface-level platforms. The inbound stop is near the corner of Church and Market Streets, while the outbound stop is near the corner of Church and 14th Streets. The F Market & Wharves streetcar line, running along Market Street, also has stops at the intersection. The N Judah line also exits the Market Street tunnel before reaching the Church Street station and stops one block away at Church and Duboce Avenue.

== History ==
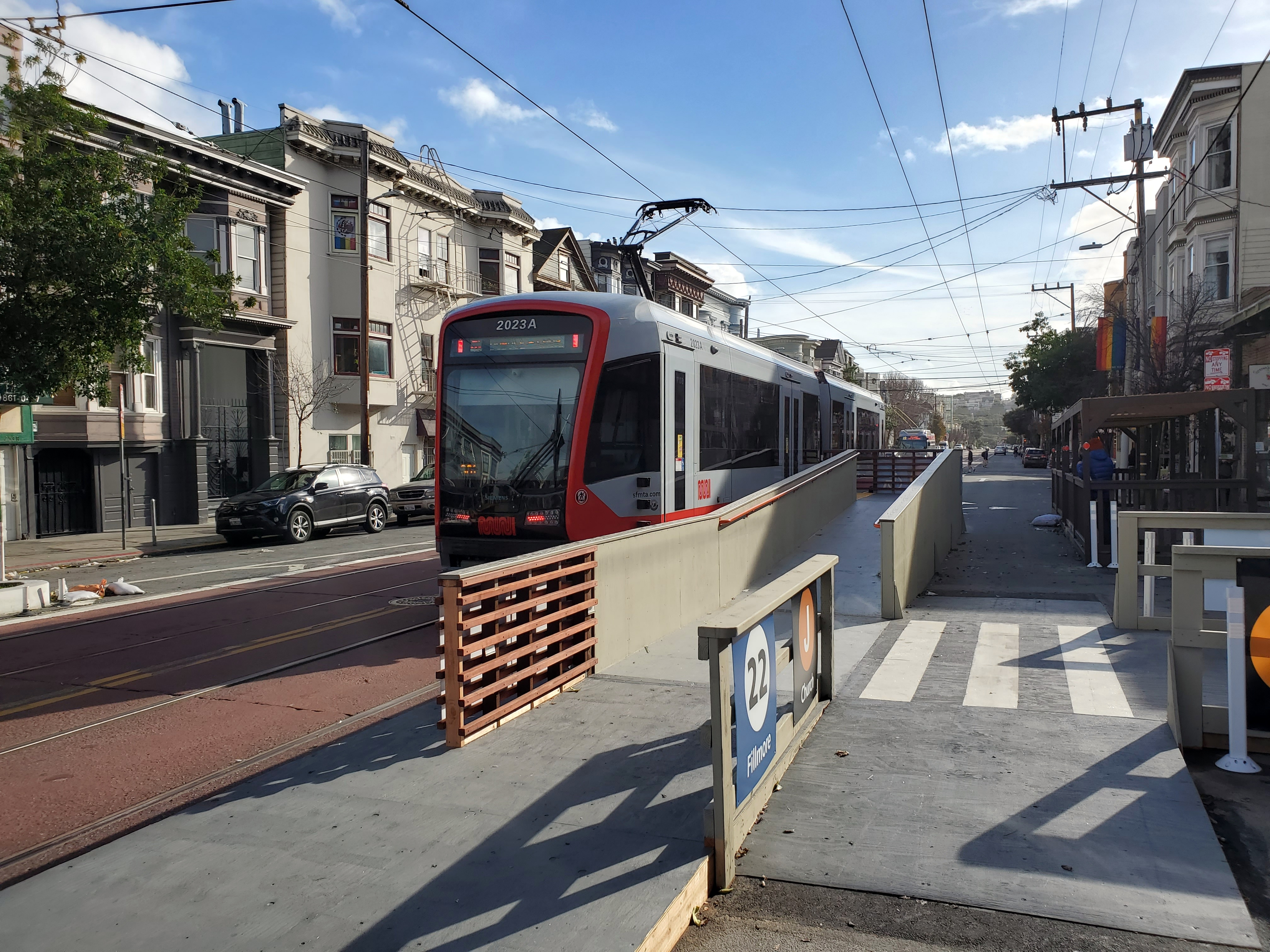
An outbound J Church train at Market Street in December 2020

The station was constructed by BART as part of the Market Street subway. The BART Board approved the name "Church Street" in December 1965. Service at the station began in June 1980. The station was featured in the 1982 Nick Nolte and Eddie Murphy film 48 Hrs. Seismic retrofitting of the station took place in the first half of 2009.

As part of August 2020 changes to Muni Metro, the J became an all-surface line. The J terminated at the inbound platform on Church Street, providing an accessible transfer between the J and subway trains. A mini-high platform was to be constructed on the inbound platform at Church and Duboce, and an outbound mini-high platform was to be built on Church Street south of Market Street, allowing the J to be re-extended slightly to Duboce Street in October 2020. The forced transfer at Church station – which requires J Church riders to cross two streets and use two elevators to transfer – was criticized by disability advocates.

However, on August 25, 2020 – just days after the changes – all Muni Metro service was again replaced by buses. J Church rail service resumed on December 19, 2020, with both new mini-high platforms in use and Duboce as the new terminus. The platforms were painted with a mural, Them (Ramp) by Simon Malvaez, in early 2021.

In 2022, new decorative railings were added on both Market Street boarding islands as part of the Upper Market Street Safety Project. They feature a quote from Harvey Milk's 1977 "You've Got to Have Hope" speech, as well as an illustration of streetcar #1051, which is dedicated in Milk's honor.
