= Church and 22nd Street station =

Light rail stop in San Francisco, California, US

Church and 22nd Street
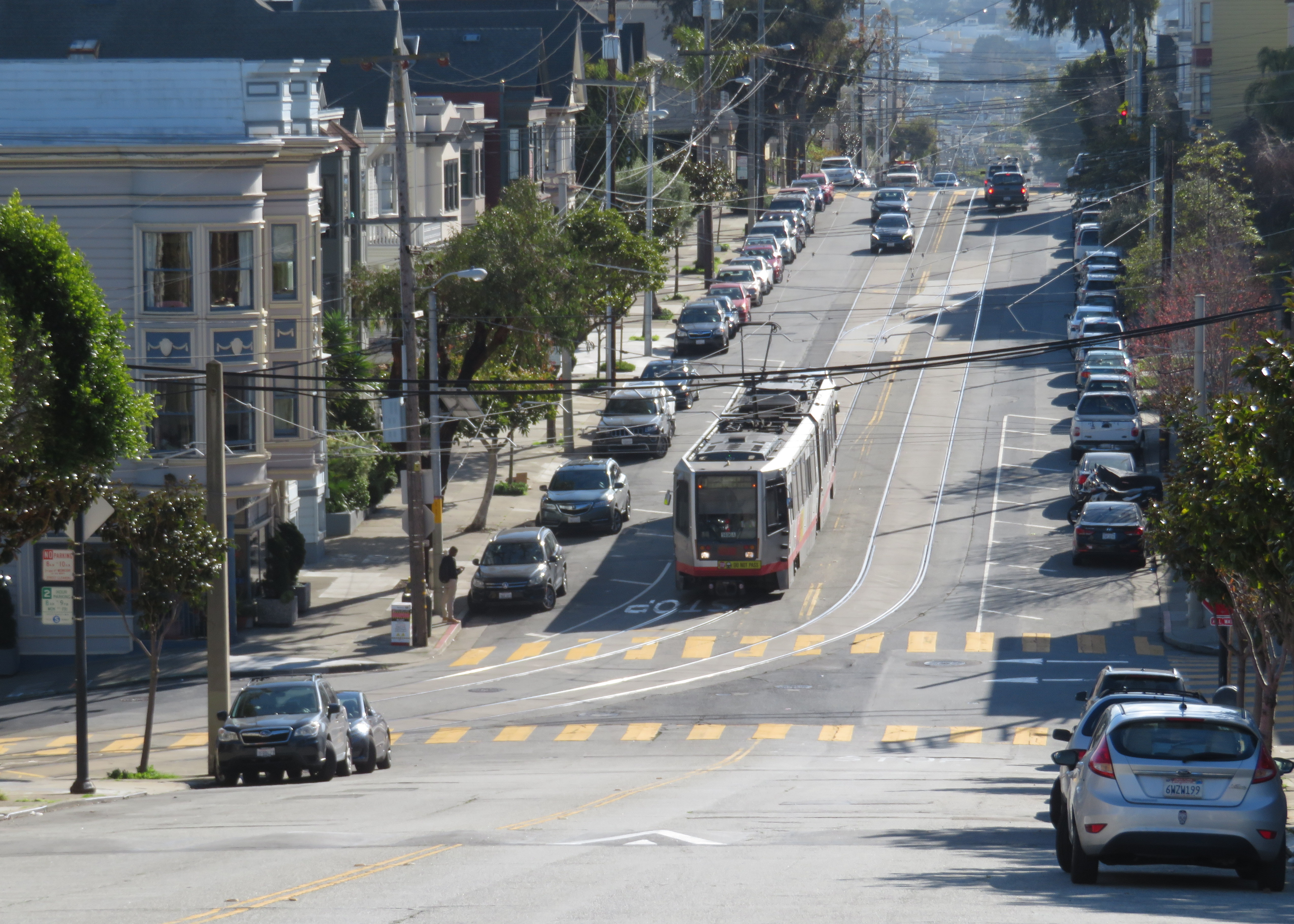
- Eastbound train at Church and 22nd Street in January 2019

General information
- Location: Church Street at 22nd Street; San Francisco, California
- Coordinates: 37°45′18″N 122°25′40″W
- Platforms: None, passengers wait on sidewalk
- Tracks: 2

Construction
- Accessible: No

History
- Opened: August 11, 1917

Services
Preceding station	Muni	Following station
Church and 24th Street toward Balboa Park	J Church	Right Of Way/21st Street toward Embarcadero
Location

Church and 22nd Street station is a light rail stop on the Muni Metro J Church line, located in the Noe Valley neighborhood of San Francisco, California. The stop, which opened with the line on August 11, 1917, is located on Church Street just south of a short rail-only right of way that allows the line to avoid a steep hill on Church Street near 21st Street. The stop has no platforms, trains stop at marked poles just south of 22nd Street and passengers cross a parking lane on Church Street to board trains. The stop is not accessible to people with disabilities.

The stop is also served by the J Bus route which provides service along the J Church line during the early morning when trains do not operate.

In March 2014, Muni released details of the proposed implementation of their Transit Effectiveness Project (later rebranded MuniForward), which included a variety of stop changes for the J Church line. A new outbound platform would be built on the private right of way north of 22nd Street, while a transit bulb would be built for the inbound stop.
