= Right Of Way/20th Street station =

Light rail stop in San Francisco, California, US

Right Of Way/20th Street
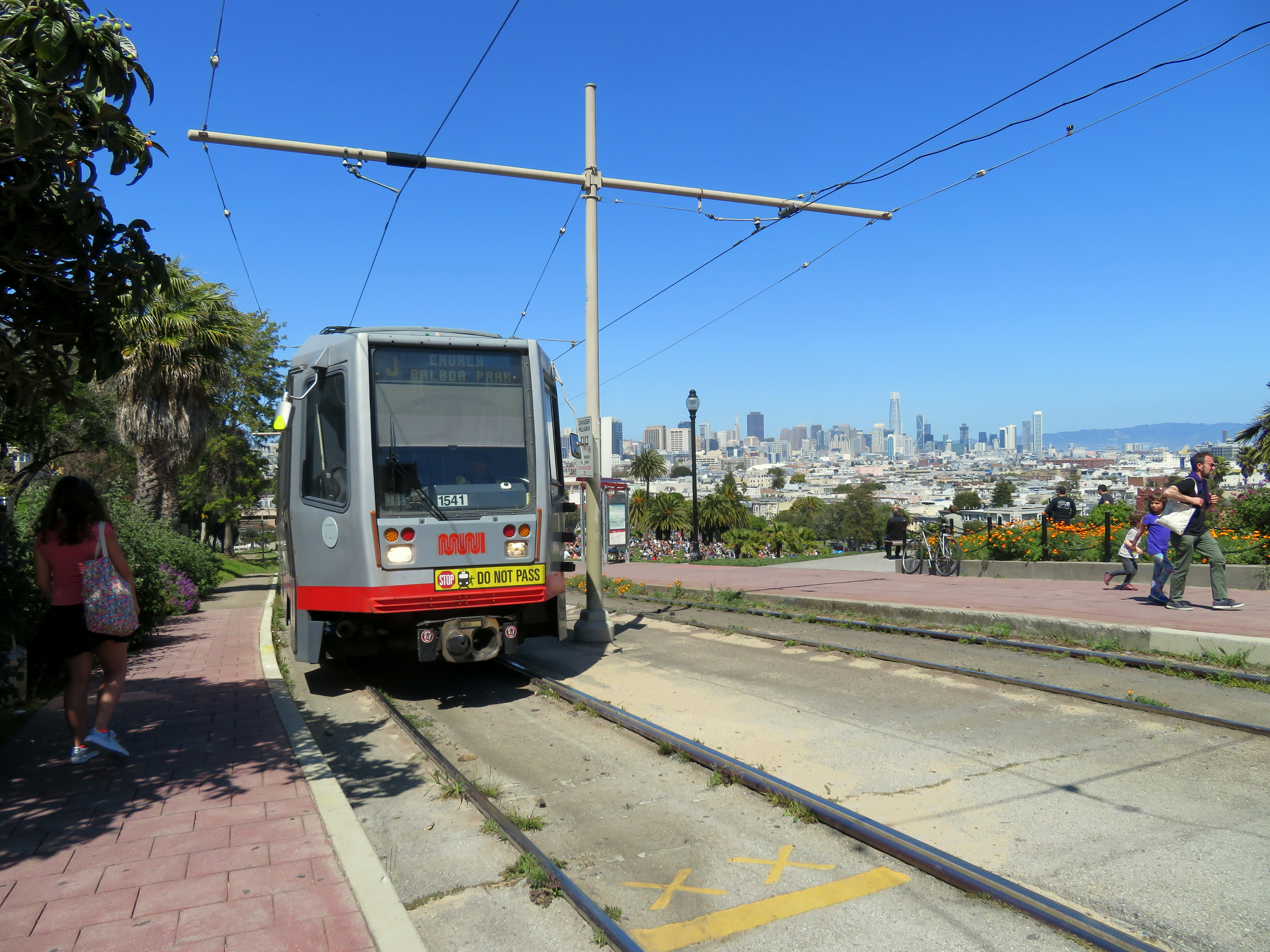
- Westbound train at the station in April 2018

General information
- Location: 20th Street and Church Street; San Francisco, California
- Coordinates: 37°45′30″N 122°25′40″W
- Platforms: 2 side platforms
- Tracks: 2

Construction
- Accessible: No

History
- Opened: August 11, 1917
- Rebuilt: c. 1980

Services
Preceding station	Muni	Following station
Right Of Way/Liberty toward Balboa Park	J Church	Church and 18th Street toward Embarcadero
Location

Right Of Way/20th Street station is a light rail stop on the Muni Metro J Church line, located on a rail-only right of way in the southwest corner of Dolores Park near the intersection of 20th Street and Church Street in San Francisco, California. The stop opened with the line on August 11, 1917. The station has two side platforms where passengers board or depart from trains. The stop is not accessible to people with disabilities.

The stop is also served by the J Bus route which provides service along the J Church line during the early morning when trains do not operate.

In March 2014, Muni released details of the proposed implementation of their Transit Effectiveness Project (later rebranded MuniForward), which included a variety of stop changes for the J Church line. No changes were proposed for the stop at 20th Street.
