= Right Of Way/21st Street station =

Light rail stop in San Francisco, California, US

Right Of Way/21st Street
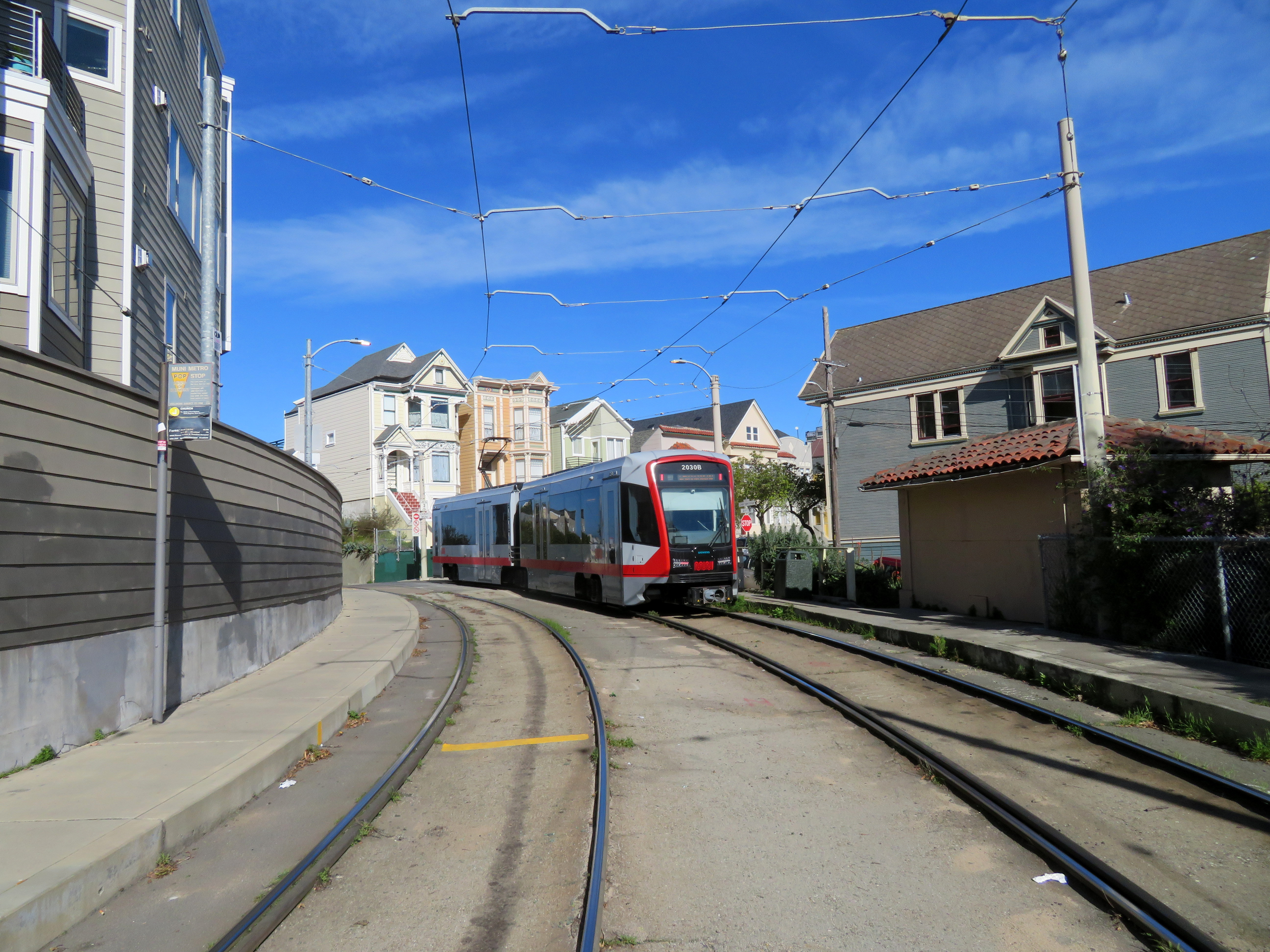
- Eastbound train at 21st Street in January 2019

General information
- Location: 21st Street and Chattanooga Street; San Francisco, California
- Coordinates: 37°45′24″N 122°25′37″W
- Platforms: 2 side platforms
- Tracks: 2

Construction
- Accessible: No

History
- Opened: August 11, 1917

Services
Preceding station	Muni	Following station
Church and 22nd Street toward Balboa Park	J Church	Right Of Way/Liberty toward Embarcadero
Location

Right Of Way/21st Street station is a light rail stop on the Muni Metro J Church line, located in the Dolores Heights neighborhood of San Francisco, California. The stop, which opened with the line on August 11, 1917, is located on a short rail-only right of way that allows the line to avoid the steep hill on Church Street to the west. The stop has a pair of side platforms located south of 21st Street on a sharp curve. The stop is not accessible to people with disabilities.

A shelter on the eastbound platform, a stucco structure with tile roof, was boarded up around 2010.

In March 2014, Muni released details of the proposed implementation of their Transit Effectiveness Project (later rebranded MuniForward), which included a variety of stop changes for the J Church line. No changes were proposed to the 21st Street stop.
