= Church and 16th Street station =

Light rail stop in San Francisco, California, US

Church and 16th Street
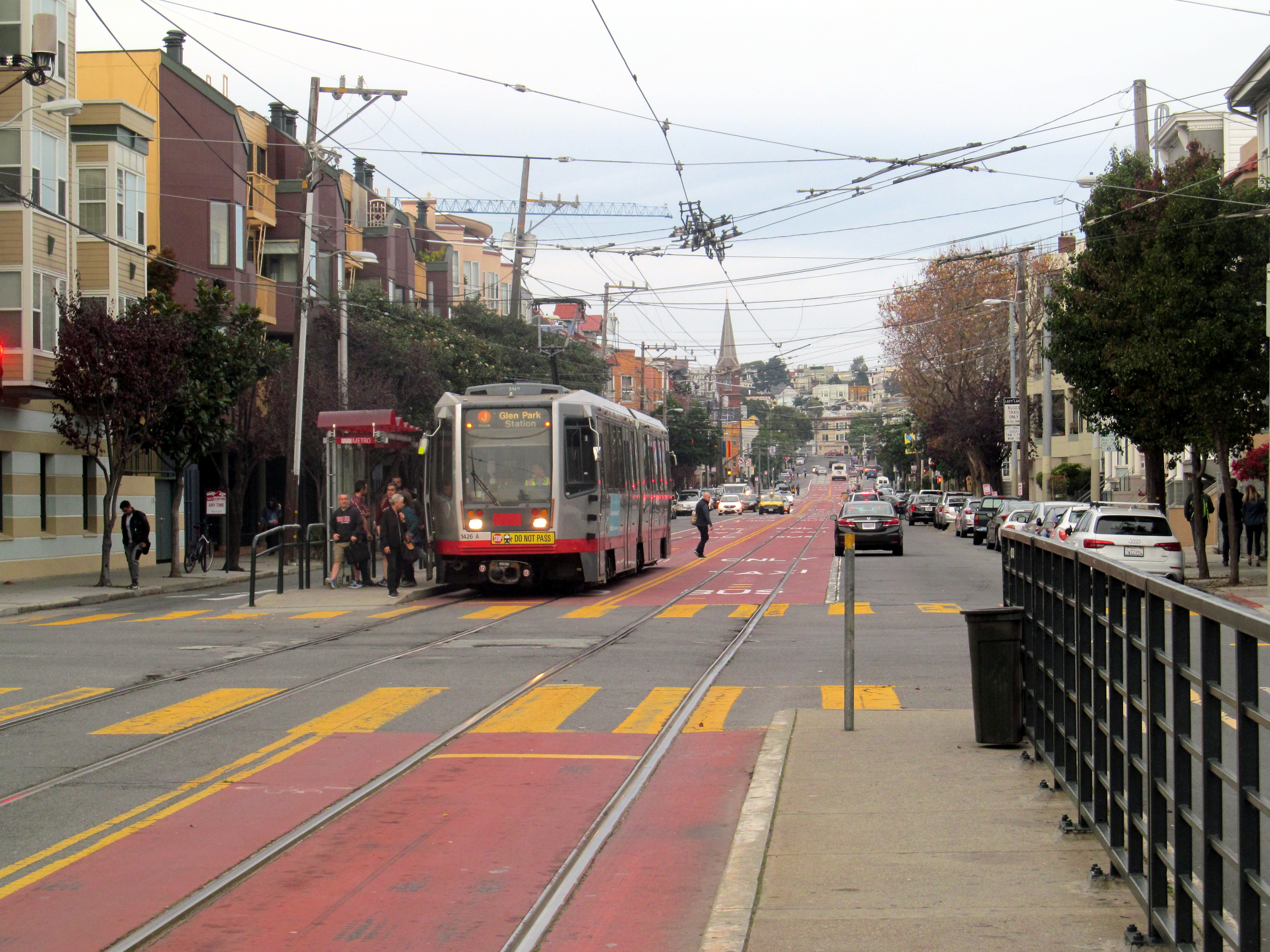
- Westbound train at Church and 16th Street in December 2017

General information
- Location: Church Street at 16th Street; San Francisco, California
- Coordinates: 37°45′52″N 122°25′43″W
- Platforms: 2 side platforms
- Tracks: 2
- Connections: Muni: 22

Construction
- Accessible: No

History
- Opened: August 11, 1917

Services
Preceding station	Muni	Following station
Church and 18th Street toward Balboa Park	J Church	Church and Market toward Embarcadero
Location

Church and 16th Street station is a light rail stop on the Muni Metro J Church line, located in the Castro neighborhood of San Francisco, California. The station opened with the line on August 11, 1917. The station has two side platforms in the middle of Church Street (traffic islands) where passengers board or depart from trains. The stop is not accessible to people with disabilities.

The stop is also served by bus route 22 plus the J Bus which provides service along the J Church line during the early morning when trains do not operate.

In March 2014, Muni released details of the proposed implementation of their Transit Effectiveness Project (later rebranded MuniForward), which included a variety of stop changes for the J Church line. No changes were proposed for the 16th Street stop. One early-implementation item – red transit-only lanes from the 16th Street platforms northwards – was installed in March 2013 while the rest of the project was still in planning.
