= Church and 26th Street station =

Light rail stop in San Francisco, California, US

Church and 26th Street
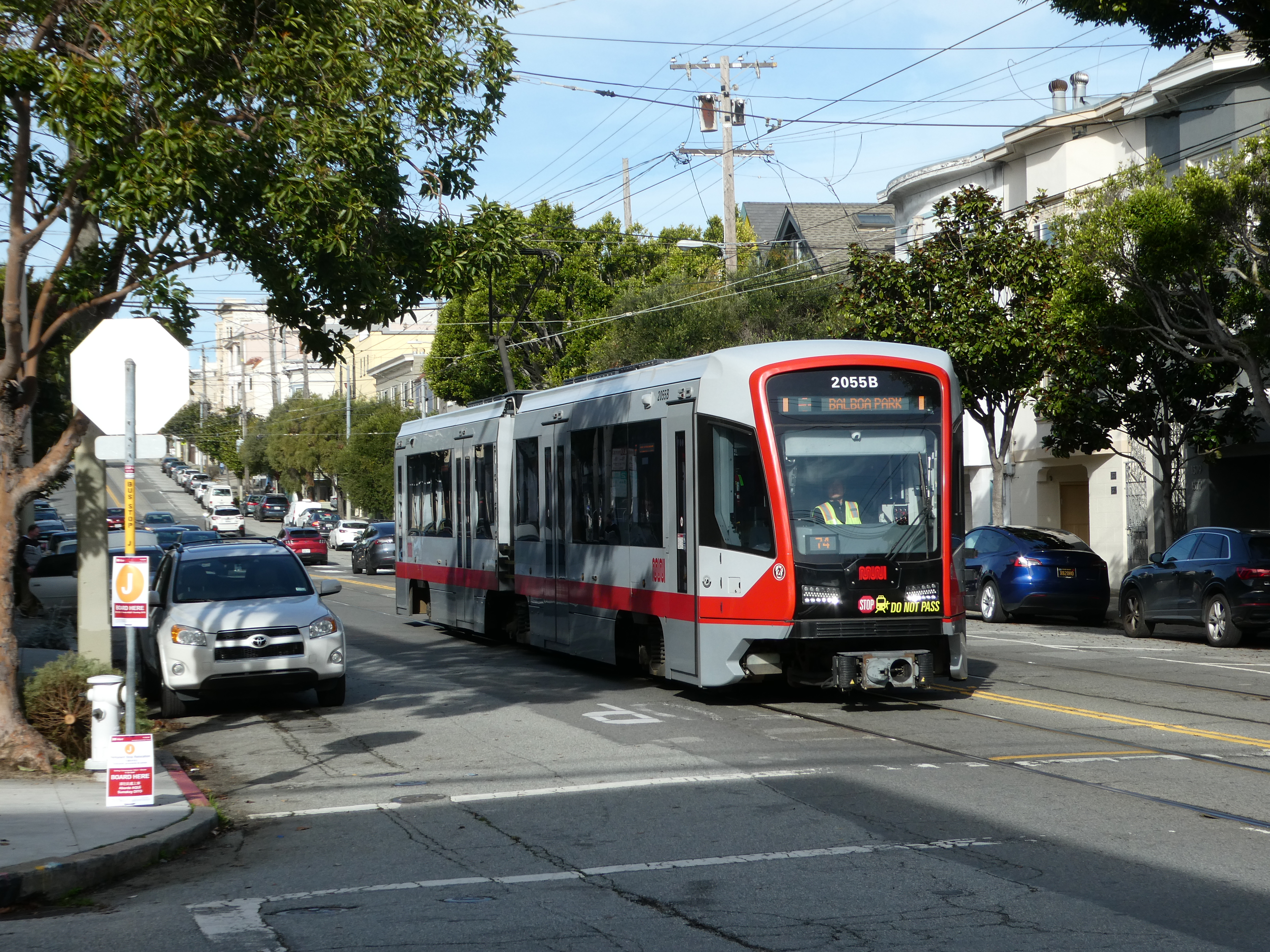
- An outbound train at the stop in 2025

General information
- Location: Church Street at Clipper Street; San Francisco, California
- Coordinates: 37.74851°N 122.42717°W
- Platforms: None; passengers wait on sidewalk
- Tracks: 2

Construction
- Accessible: No

History
- Opened: August 11, 1917
- Rebuilt: November 25, 2024

Services
Preceding station	Muni	Following station
Church and 28th Street toward Balboa Park	J Church	Church and 24th Street toward Embarcadero
Location

Church and 26th Street is a light rail stop on the Muni Metro J Church line, located in the Noe Valley neighborhood of San Francisco, California. The stop has no platforms, trains stop at marked poles before crossing 26th Street and passengers cross a parking lane on Church Street to board trains. The stop is not accessible.

== History ==
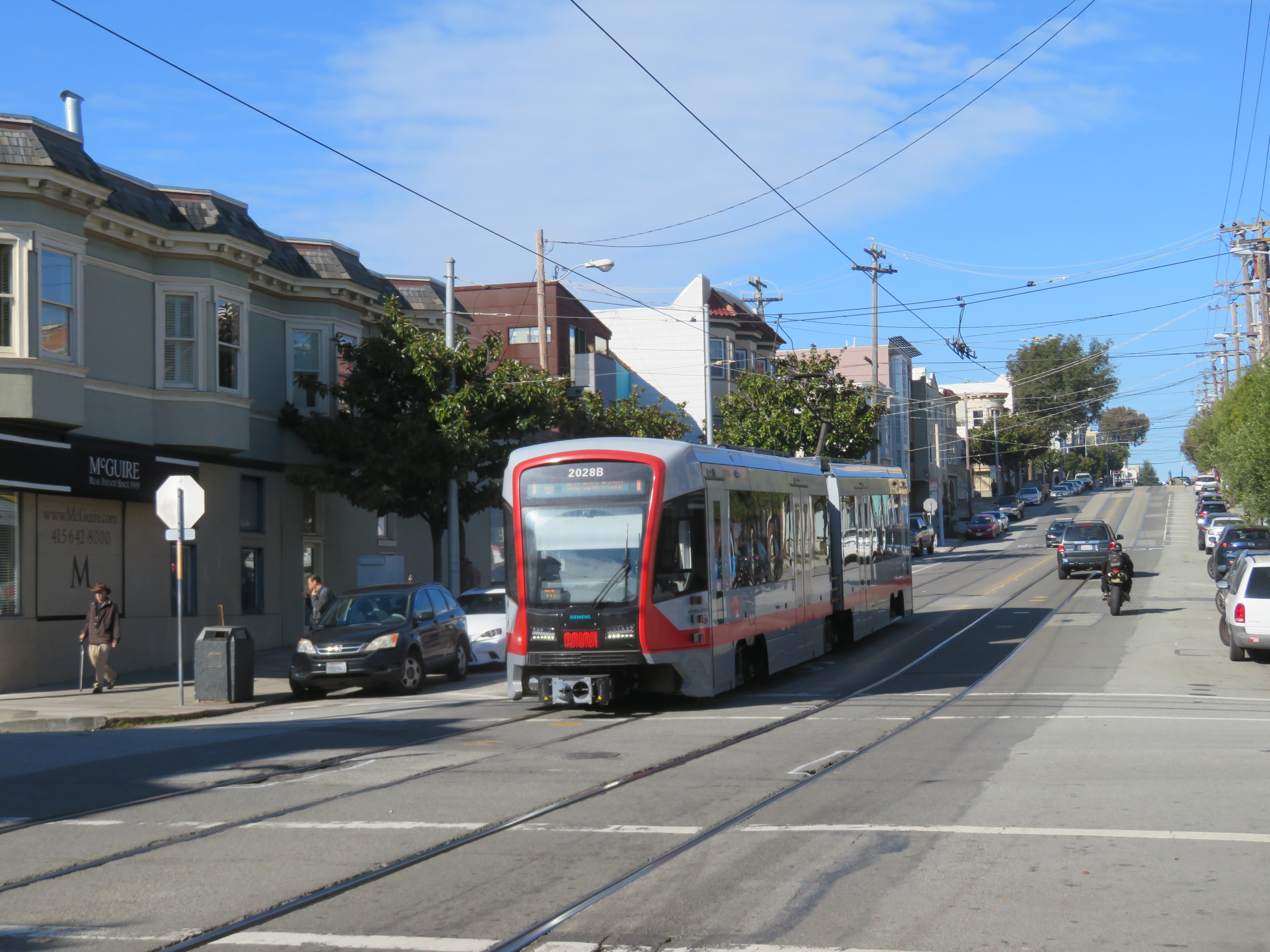
An outbound train at Clipper Street in 2019

The J Church line opened on August 11, 1917. By the early 2010s, trains stopped at Church and Clipper. In March 2014, Muni released details of the proposed implementation of their Transit Effectiveness Project (later rebranded MuniForward), which included a variety of stop changes for the J Church line. Under that plan, bulb-outs were to be built to serve as platforms for the Clipper stop. A more limited preliminary project announced in November 2019 was to include some modifications to the stop.

In October 2024, the SFMTA board approved plans to relocate the stop one half-block south to 26th Avenue. The stop was planned to be moved – along with the stop at 27th Street moving to 28th – by the end of 2024. The stop was moved effective November 25, 2024.
