= Church and 24th Street station =

Light rail stop in San Francisco, California, US

Church and 24th Street
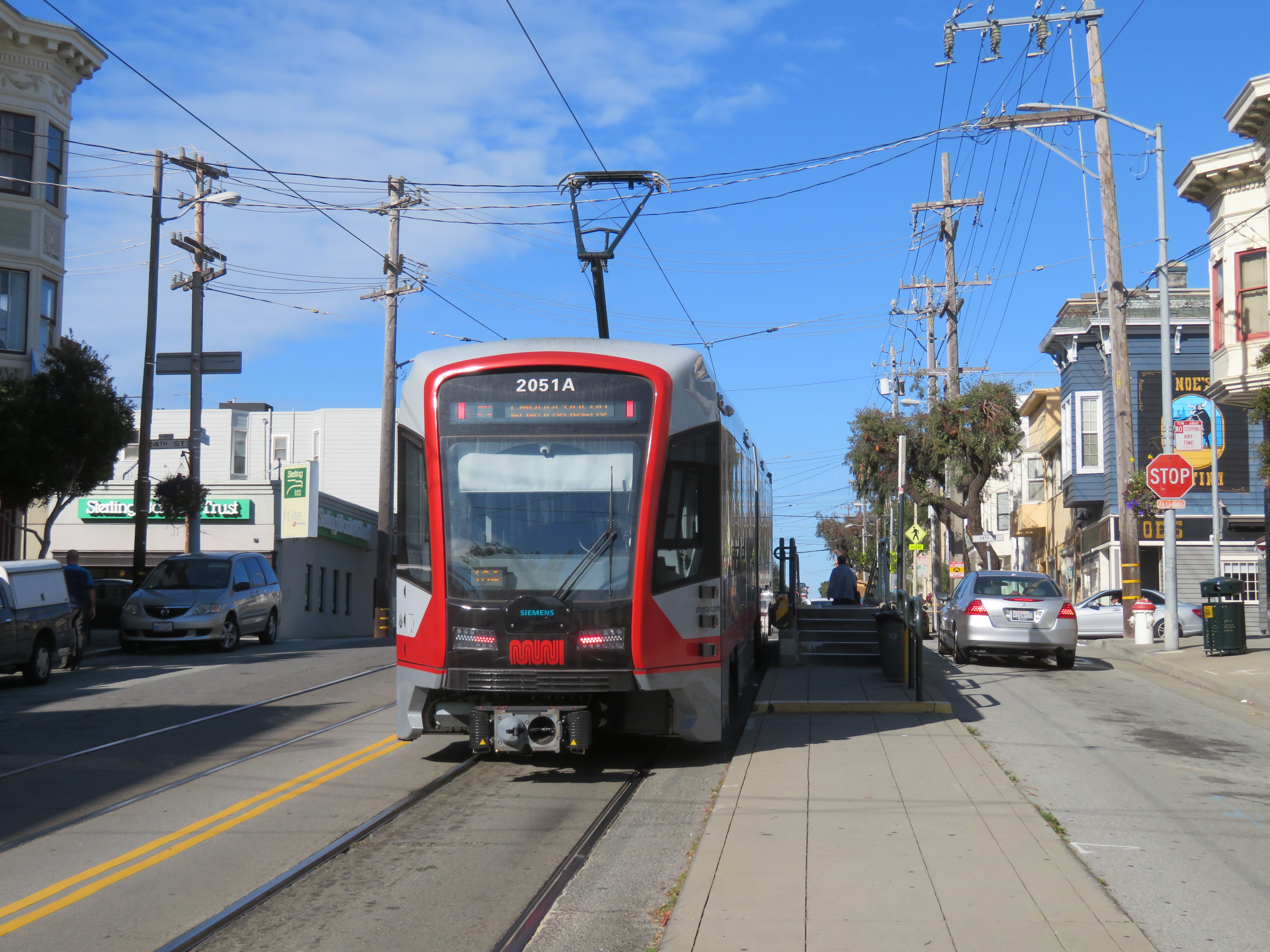
- Eastbound train at Church and 24th Street in January 2019

General information
- Location: Church Street at 24th Street; San Francisco, California
- Coordinates: 37°45′06″N 122°25′39″W
- Platforms: 2 side platforms
- Tracks: 2
- Connections: Muni: 48

Construction
- Accessible: Yes

History
- Opened: August 11, 1917

Services
Preceding station	Muni	Following station
Church and 26th Street toward Balboa Park	J Church	Church and 22nd Street toward Embarcadero
Location

Church and 24th Street is a light rail stop on the Muni Metro J Church line, located in the Noe Valley neighborhood of San Francisco, California. The stop opened with the line on August 11, 1917. The station has two side platforms in the middle of Church Street (traffic islands) where passengers board or depart from trains. The station also has mini-high platforms providing access to people with disabilities.

The stop is also served by bus route 48 plus the J Bus which provides service along the J Church line during the early morning when trains do not operate.

In March 2014, Muni released details of the proposed implementation of their Transit Effectiveness Project (later rebranded MuniForward), which included a variety of stop changes for the J Church line. Under that plan, a traffic light would replace the stop signs at the intersection of Church Street and 24th Street; the platforms would be moved to the far side of the intersection in each direction, allowing trains to pass through the signal without stopping.
