= J Church =

Light rail line in San Francisco, California

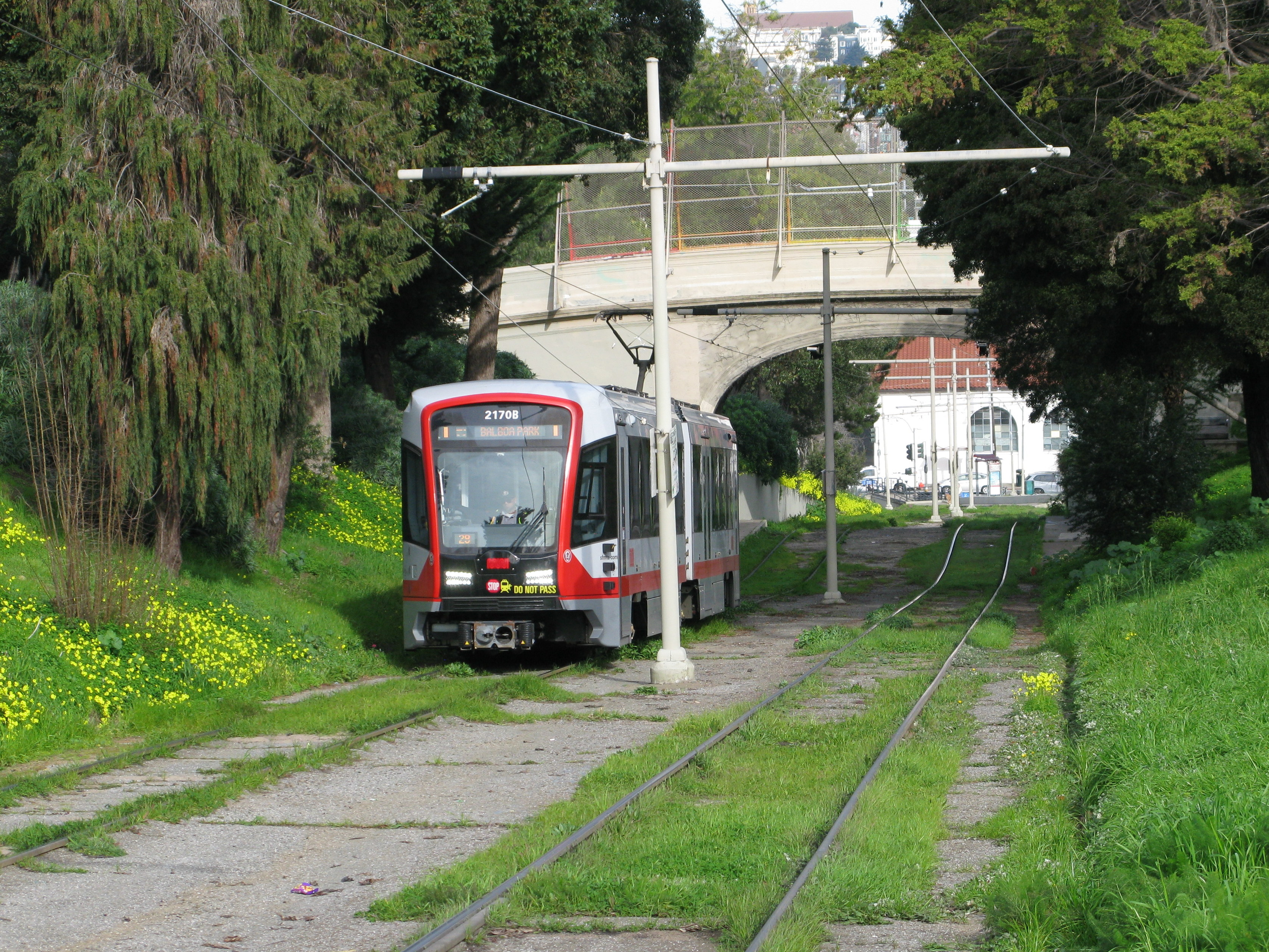
- An outbound J Church train in Dolores Park in 2026

Overview
- Owner: San Francisco Municipal Transportation Agency
- Locale: San Francisco, California
- Termini: Embarcadero station; Balboa Park station
- Stations: 26

Service
- Type: Light rail/streetcar
- System: Muni Metro
- Operator: San Francisco Municipal Railway
- Rolling stock: Siemens LRV4
- Daily ridership: 8,100 (June 2026)

History
- Opened: August 11, 1917

Technical
- Track gauge: 4 ft 8 1/2 in (1,435 mm) standard gauge
- Electrification: Overhead line, 600 V DC
Route diagram
J Church highlighted in yellow
Key

The J Church is an urban rail transit line of the Muni Metro system in San Francisco, California. It has both light rail and streetcar segments. The line runs between Embarcadero station and Balboa Park station through Noe Valley. Opened on August 11, 1917, it is the oldest and has the lowest ridership of all of the Muni Metro lines.

== Route description ==
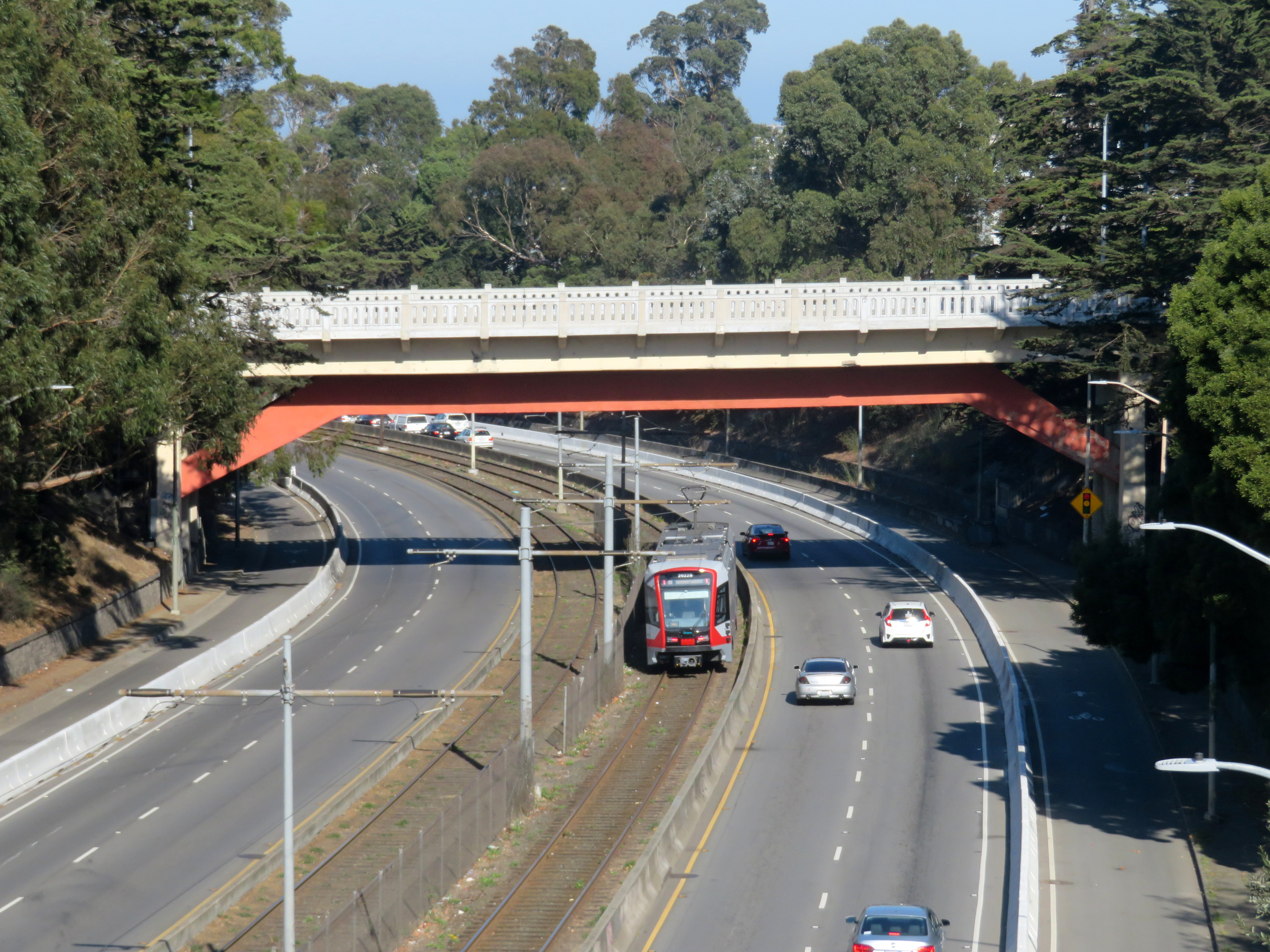
A train on the private right-of-way in the median of San Jose Avenue

The inbound terminal is at Embarcadero station. The line runs west through the Market Street subway to a portal on Duboce Avenue, before turning onto Church Street. The line continues south on Church Street to 18th Street. Between 18th and 20th Street, the line cuts through Dolores Park in a private right-of-way featuring a 9% grade, the steepest section of the Muni Metro system. After crossing 20th Street, it cuts across the blocks east of Church, around a steep hill and returns to Church Street at 22nd Street in Noe Valley. The J then follows Church to 30th Street, then to San Jose Avenue and Geneva. Between Randall and Cotter Streets, there is a right-of-way in the middle of San Jose Avenue. At the end of the line, the J loops around the Metro yard at San Jose and Geneva, alongside Balboa Park station.

=== Operation ===
The J Church begins service at 5 am on weekdays and 6 am on weekends, and runs until midnight. Daytime headways are every 15 minutes; nights and weekend mornings are every 20 minutes. Unlike the other Muni Metro lines, there is not a corresponding overnight Owl bus during the hours that rail service is not running.

== History ==
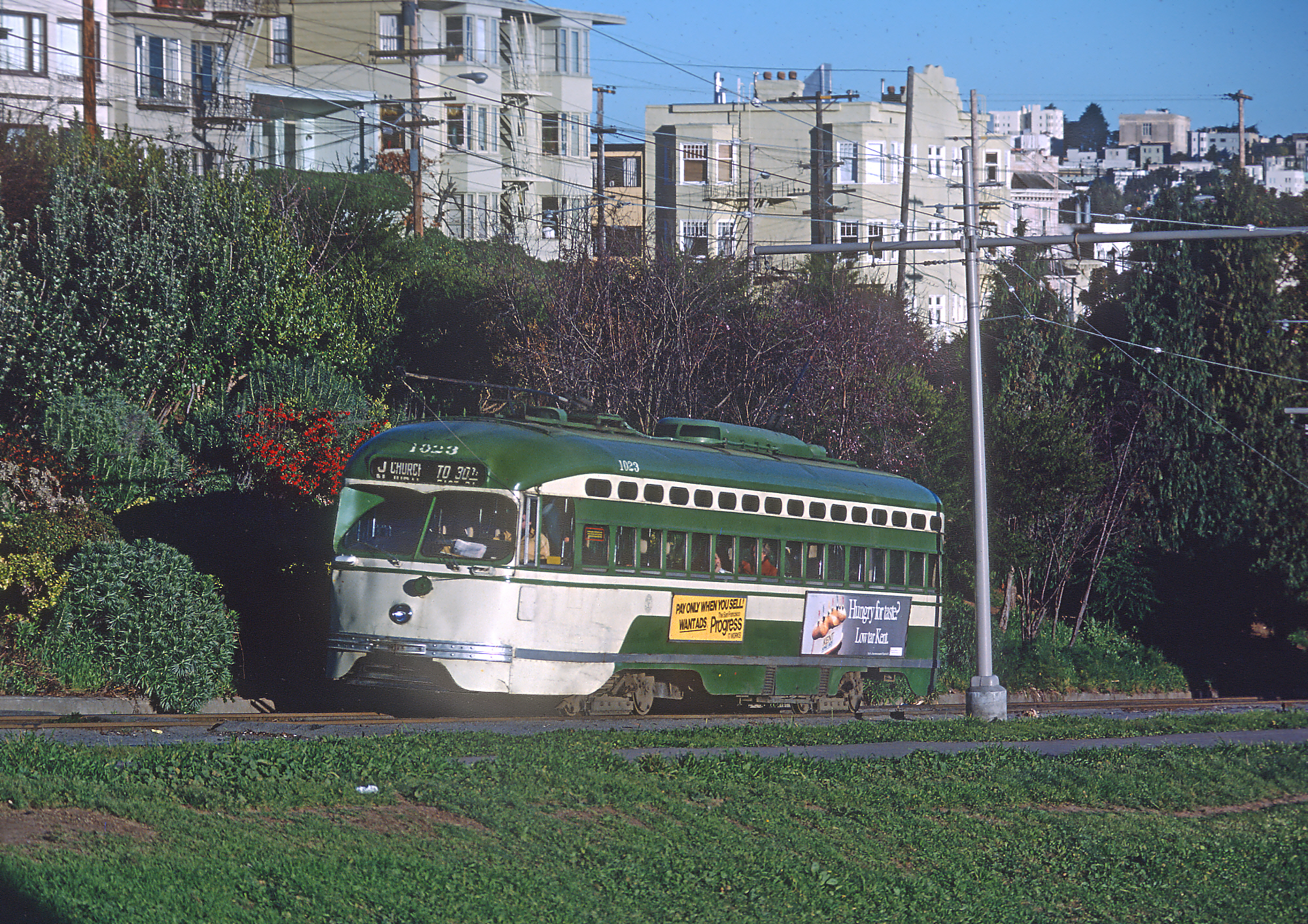
An outbound J Church PCC streetcar running through Dolores Park in February 1980

Track work on the J Church line was largely completed in 1916, and service from Church and 30th Street station to Market Street and Van Ness Avenue on August 11, 1917. Service was extended along Van Ness Avenue to Pine Street on August 29, 1917; this extension was discontinued on May 31, 1918, with service extended along Market Street to the Ferry Building the next day. The new Transbay Terminal became the inner terminus for every other streetcar on January 15, 1939, with all service routed there after January 1, 1941.

As part of the creation of the Muni Metro system, it was partially converted to modern light rail operation in 1981 — the last line to do so. While many streetcar lines were converted to bus lines after World War II, the J Church avoided this due to the private right-of-way it uses to climb the steepest grades on Church Street, between 18th Street and 22nd Street.

=== Extension to Balboa Park ===
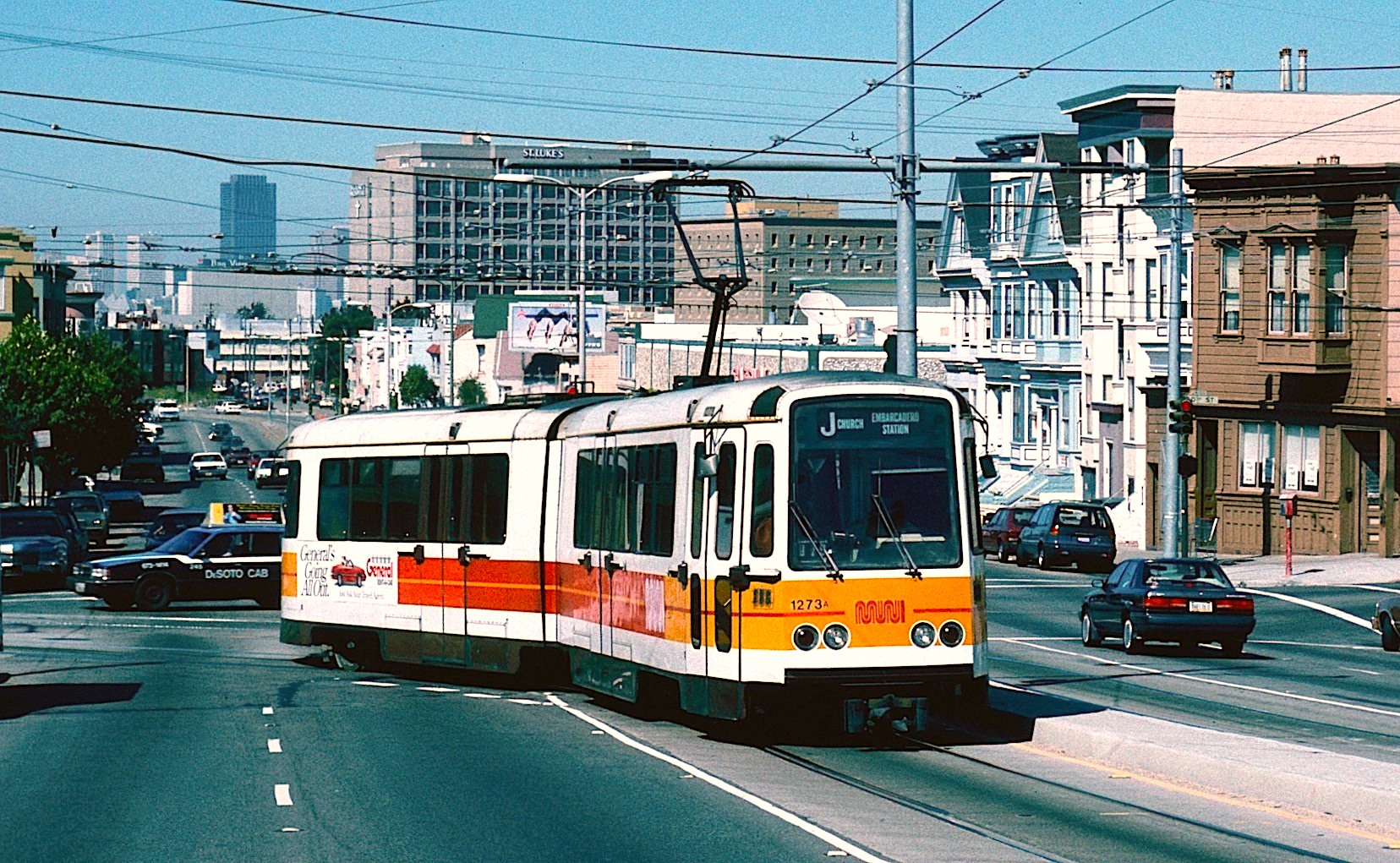
An outbound J Church car turns from 30th Street onto San Jose Avenue in 1993, two months after the start of all-day service on the extension south of 30th.

The outer end of the line was originally at Church and 30th Streets, where streetcars used a wye to turn around. Studies to extend the line from its southern terminus had been made in the 1920s and 1970's. In 1990–91, the tracks were extended to the Balboa Park BART station and the Metro Center (Muni light-rail maintenance and operations base), giving J-line cars a much shorter connection to the yard than previously. The extension opened on August 31, 1991, but the 2.3-mile (3.7 km) new section was initially used only by light rail cars starting or ending their runs; all-day J-line service was not extended along the new tracks until June 19, 1993.

This trackage was laid along the Bernal Cut, the former right-of-way of the San Francisco & San Jose Railroad.

This extension of the J-line to the Metro Center now also provides vintage F Market cars a connection to the adjacent Cameron Beach Yard, where they are stored when not in service. Occasionally J-Church streetcars use the siding at 30th and Church as a terminus during rush hours, or during irregular operations.

The 19th Avenue Platform & Trackway Improvement Project originally included pocket tracks to allow J Church trains to continue past Balboa Park with service to Stonestown. Due to community backlash, the compromise plan did not include the facilities necessary to run joint J-M service.

=== Later changes ===
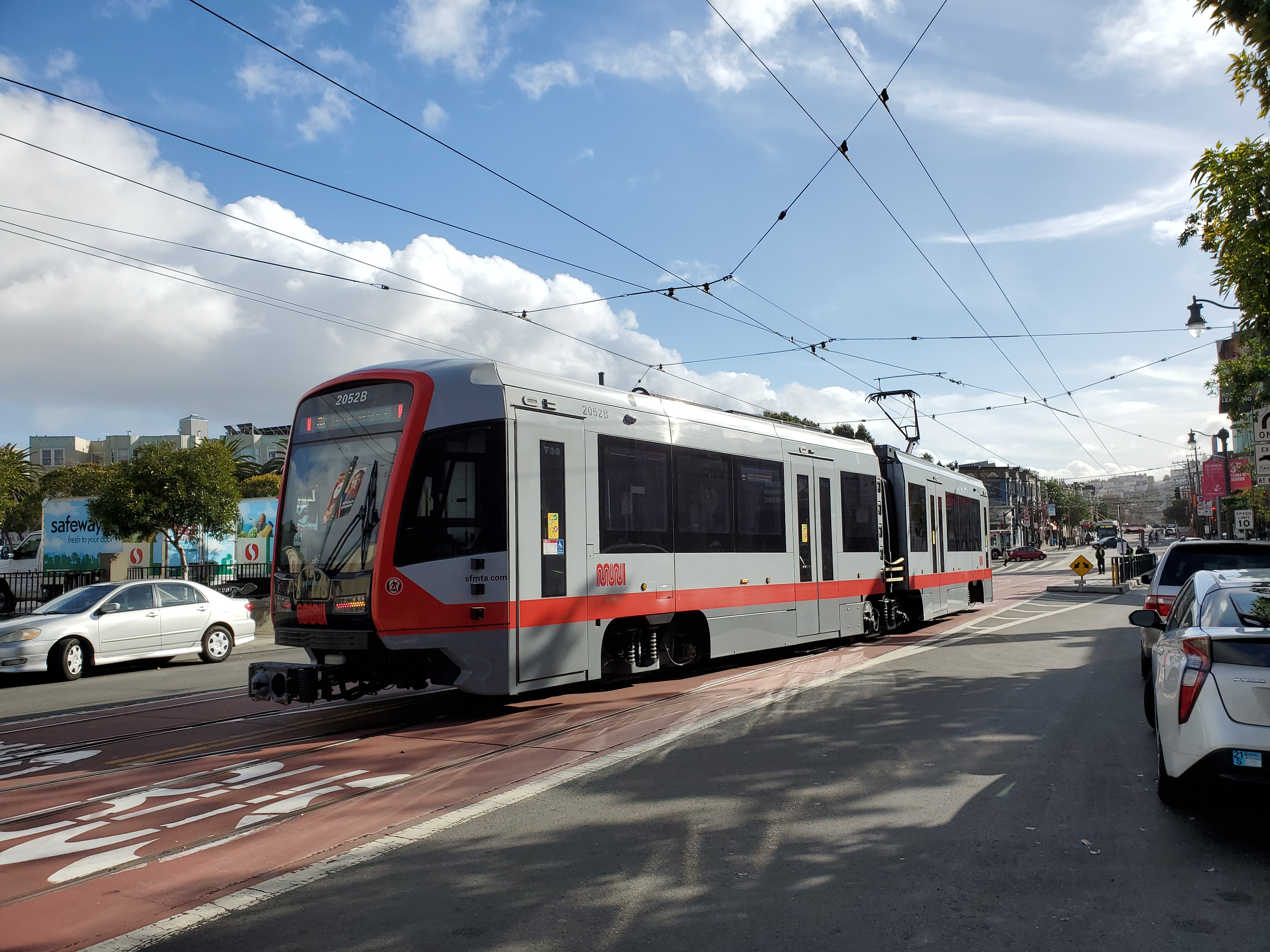
An outbound train switching back towards Balboa Park Station from the Duboce terminal in December 2020

In March 2014, Muni released details of the proposed implementation of their Transit Effectiveness Project (later rebranded MuniForward), which included a variety of changes for the J Church line intended to improve reliability and decrease travel times. The proposed changes included the removal of two stops (Liberty and Church and 30th Street), minor relocations of several other stops, construction of boarding islands and transit bulbs, and transit-only lanes on three blocks of Church Street, plus an increase in frequency from 9.5-minute headways to 8-minute headways during the morning peak. One element – dedicated transit/taxi lanes and left turn restrictions on Church Street between Duboce Avenue and 16th Street – was chosen for implementation as a pilot project to test its effectiveness. The red-painted dedicated center lanes (for use also by the 22-Fillmore bus) and turn restrictions were added in March 2013. The project proved to reduce travel time and improve reliability on both rail and bus, while not significantly increasing travel time in private automobiles. The SFMTA Board made the changes permanent in June 2015.

The line was temporarily through-routed with the surface section of the K Ingleside line from June 25 to August 24, 2018, due to the Twin Peaks Tunnel shutdown. In November 2019, the SFMTA announced plans for near-term changes, including the closure of the Church and 30th Street stop and the addition of a traffic signal at Cesar Chavez Street. A pilot program was also to use a surface turnback on The Embarcadero in an effort to reduce terminal delays at Embarcadero station.

On March 30, 2020, Muni Metro service was replaced with buses due to the COVID-19 pandemic. Rail service returned on August 22, 2020, with the routes reconfigured to improve reliability in the subway. J Church service ran only on the surface. The J initially terminated at the inbound platform on Church Street at Market Street, requiring passengers to transfer between the J and subway trains. A mini-high platform was to be constructed on the inbound platform at Church and Duboce, and an outbound mini-high platform will be built on Church Street south of Market Street, which was to allow the J to be re-extended slightly to Duboce Street (with additional transfer to the N Judah) in October 2020. The forced transfer at Church station, which required J Church riders to cross two streets and use two elevators to transfer, was criticized by disability advocates and others.

Rail service was again replaced with buses on August 25 due to issues with malfunctioning overhead wire splices and the need to quarantine control center staff after a COVID-19 case. J Church service on the surface-only Balboa Park–Church and Duboce routing resumed on December 19, 2020, while full service to Embarcadero station was restored on February 19, 2022.

=== Future plans ===
The SFMTA resumed planning for the Muni Forward project, the J Church Safety and Accessibility Project, in 2022. Changes on the San Jose Avenue portion of the line were approved in October 2023. These include transit-only lanes between Ocean Avenue and Cotter Street, platform extensions and accessible mini-high platforms at two stops, and pedestrian safety changes at several intersections. Some changes will be implemented in a "quick-build" phase in late 2023 and early 2024, while most construction will take place in 2025–2027.

In December 2021, the SFMTA indicated a possible use of historic street cars to provide a one-seat service on the J Church to Embarcadero using existing surface tracks on Market Street as a future alternative to running the J Church in the subway tunnel.

In May 2024, the Federal Transit Administration awarded the SFMTA $4.7 million to construct accessible platforms at eight Muni Metro stops, including five J Church stops.

== Station listing ==
Some stops have concrete boarding islands, while others require passengers to board from the street. Some stops have raised platforms for accessibility. While most other lines in the rail system can be run in two-car configurations, the J line is almost always run with a single car in order to accommodate the stops in the right-of-way, which are not long enough to have two light rail cars with open doors simultaneously.

Station/Stop	Neighborhood	Muni Metro lines	Notes and major connections
Embarcadero	Financial District	K Ingleside L Taraval M Ocean View N Judah S Shuttle	BART: Market & Wharves; SF Ferry Terminal; Muni: 1, 2, 6, 7X, 9, 9R, 12, 14, 14R, 14X, 21, 30X, 31, 41, 81X, 82X; Regional bus services: Golden Gate Transit, Presidio Go Shuttle, SamTrans
Montgomery	Financial District	K Ingleside L Taraval M Ocean View N Judah S Shuttle	BART: Market & Wharves; Muni: 2, 3, 5, 5R, 6, 7, 7X, 8, 8AX, 8BX, 9, 9R, 10, 15, 21, 30, 31, 45, 76X, 81X, Geary BRT (38, 38R); AC Transit, Golden Gate Transit, SamTrans
Powell	Civic Center, Mid-Market, Tenderloin	(at Union Sq/Market St)	BART: Market & Wharves; Muni: 5, 5R, 6, 7, 7X, 8, 8AX, 8BX, 9, 9R, 15, 21, 27, 30, 31, 45, 81X; AC Transit, SamTrans
Civic Center/UN Plaza	Civic Center, Mid-Market, Tenderloin	K Ingleside L Taraval M Ocean View N Judah S Shuttle	BART: Market & Wharves; Muni: 5, 5R, 6, 7, 9, 9R, 19, 21, 83X; AC Transit, Golden Gate Transit, SamTrans
Van Ness	Civic Center, Mid-Market, Tenderloin	K Ingleside L Taraval M Ocean View N Judah S Shuttle	Market & Wharves; Muni: 6, 7, 9, 9R, Van Ness BRT (47, 49, 79X); AC Transit, SamTrans
Church and Duboce	Duboce Triangle	(at separate platform)	Muni: 22
Church and Market	Duboce Triangle	K Ingleside L Taraval M Ocean View S Shuttle	Market & Wharves; Muni: 22, 37; (Surface stop located above Church station)
Church and 16th Street	Castro		Muni: 22
Church and 18th Street	Castro		Muni: 33
Right Of Way/20th Street	Mission District		(Located on Muni’s private right-of-way in Dolores Park)
Right Of Way/Liberty	Mission District		(Located on Muni's private right-of-way)
Right Of Way/21st Street	Noe Valley		(Located on Muni's private right-of-way)
Church and 22nd Street	Noe Valley		
Church and 24th Street	Noe Valley		Muni: 48
Church and 26th Street	Noe Valley		
Church and 28th Street	Noe Valley		
Church and 29th Street (inbound); Church and Day (outbound)	Noe Valley		
Church and 30th Street (inbound)	Noe Valley		Muni: 24
30th Street and Dolores	Bernal Heights		Muni: 24, 36
San Jose and Randall	Bernal Heights		Muni: 14, 49
San Jose/Glen Park	Glen Park		BART: (at Glen Park); Muni: 23, 35, 36, 44, 52, 714
San Jose and Santa Rosa	Balboa Park		
San Jose and Santa Ynez	Balboa Park		
San Jose and Ocean	Balboa Park		Muni: 29, 49
Balboa Park	Balboa Park	K Ingleside M Ocean View	BART: Muni: 8, 8BX, 28R, 29, 43, 49, 54, 88; Commute.org, Daly City Bayshore Shuttle, Sierra Point Shuttle
