= 30th Cavalry =

30th Cavalry may refer to:

== Divisions ==
- 30th Cavalry Division (Soviet Union)

== Regiments ==
- 30th Lancers (Gordon's Horse)
- 30th Virginia Volunteer Regiment, later renamed the 2nd Virginia Cavalry Regiment
- 30th Texas Cavalry Regiment

== Squadrons ==
- 30th Cavalry Squadron, Queen's Guard, Thailand

== See also ==
- 30th Division (disambiguation)
- 30th Brigade (disambiguation)
- 30th Regiment (disambiguation)
- 30th (disambiguation)
