= 30th =

30th is the ordinal form of the number 30. 30th or Thirtieth may also refer to:

- A fraction, 1/30, equal to one of 30 equal parts
- 30th of the month, a recurring calendar date

== Geography ==
- 30th meridian east, a line of longitude
- 30th meridian west, a line of longitude
- 30th parallel north, a circle of latitude
- 30th parallel south, a circle of latitude
- 30th Street (disambiguation)
- 30th Street station (disambiguation)

== Military ==
- 30th Army (disambiguation)
- 30th Battalion (disambiguation)
- 30th Brigade (disambiguation)
- 30th Division (disambiguation)
- 30th Regiment (disambiguation)
- 30th Squadron (disambiguation)

== Other ==
- "The 30th", 2022 song by American singer-songwriter Billie Eilish on the album Guitar Songs
- Thirtieth Amendment
- 30th century
- 30th century BC

== See also ==
- 30 (disambiguation)
- The Thirtieth Piece of Silver, lost 1920 American silent drama film
