= XXX Corps =

30th Corps, Thirtieth Corps, or XXX Corps may refer to:

== Russia and Soviet Union ==
=== Russian Empire ===
- 30th Army Corps (Russian Empire)

=== Soviet Union ===
- 30th Guards Army Corps
- 30th Mechanized Corps
- 30th Tank Corps

== United Kingdom ==
- XXX Corps (United Kingdom)
- 30th (1st Central) Lanarkshire Rifle Volunteer Corps
- 30th (Fishwick) Lancashire Rifle Volunteer Corps

== Other countries ==
- XXX Army Corps (Wehrmacht), Germany
- XXX Army Corps (Italy)
- XXX Corps (Pakistan)
- 30th Marine Corps, Ukraine

== See also ==
- List of military corps by number
- 30th Army (disambiguation)
- 30th Battalion (disambiguation)
- 30th Brigade (disambiguation)
- 30th Division (disambiguation)
- 30th Regiment (disambiguation)
- 30th Squadron (disambiguation)
- 30th (disambiguation)
- XXX (disambiguation)
