= 30th Army =

30th Army may refer to:

- 30th Army (People's Republic of China)
- Thirtieth Army (Japan), Imperial Japanese Army
- 30th Army (Soviet Union)
- 30th Air Army, Soviet Union

== See also ==
- List of armies by number
- XXX Corps (disambiguation)
- 30th Division (disambiguation)
- 30th Brigade (disambiguation)
- 30th Regiment (disambiguation)
- 30th Battalion (disambiguation)
- 30th Squadron (disambiguation)
- 30th (disambiguation)
