= 30th Brigade =

30th Brigade or 30th Infantry Brigade may refer to:

== Australia ==
- 30th Brigade (Australia)

== Greece ==
- 30th Mechanized Infantry Brigade (Greece)

== India ==
- 30th Indian Brigade of the British Indian Army in the First World War
- 30th Indian Infantry Brigade of the British Indian Army in the Second World War

== Romania ==
- Michael the Brave 30th Guards Brigade

== Russia ==
- 30th Separate Guards Motor Rifle Brigade, a unit of the Russian Ground Forces

== South Korea ==
- 30th Armored Brigade (South Korea)

== Spain ==
- 30th Mixed Brigade, a unit of the Spanish Republican Army in the Spanish Civil War

== Ukraine ==
- 30th Mechanized Brigade (Ukraine), a unit of the Ukrainian Ground Forces

== United Kingdom ==
- 30th (Northumbrian) Anti-Aircraft Brigade
- 30th Armoured Brigade (United Kingdom)
- 30th Brigade (United Kingdom), 1914–1918
- 30th Infantry Brigade (United Kingdom)
- 30th (Howitzer) Brigade Royal Field Artillery

== United States ==
- 30th Air Defense Artillery Brigade
- 30th Armored Brigade Combat Team, a unit of the United States Army
- 30th Medical Brigade

== See also ==
- 30th Army (disambiguation)
- 30th Battalion (disambiguation)
- XXX Corps (disambiguation)
- 30th Division (disambiguation)
- 30th Regiment (disambiguation)
- 30th Squadron (disambiguation)
