= 30th Division =

30th Division may refer to:

== Infantry units ==
- 30th Division (1st Formation) (People's Republic of China), 1949–1952
- 30th Infantry Division (2nd Formation) (People's Republic of China)
- 30th Army Division (3rd Formation) (People's Republic of China)
- 30th Division (German Empire)
- 30th Bavarian Reserve Division, Germany
- 30th Infantry Division (Wehrmacht), Germany
- 30th Waffen Grenadier Division of the SS, Germany
- 30th Infantry Division "Sabauda", Kingdom of Italy
- 30th Division (Imperial Japanese Army)
- 30th Infantry Division (Poland)
- 30th Infantry Division (Russian Empire)
- 30th Guards Mechanized Division, Soviet Union
- 30th Guards Motor Rifle Division, Soviet Union
- 30th Guards Rifle Division, Soviet Union
- 30th Rifle Division, Soviet Union
- 30th Division (Syria), established 2017
- Division 30, a 2015 Syrian rebel group
- 30th Division (United Kingdom)
- 30th Infantry Division (United States)
- 30th Division (Yugoslav Partisans), 1943–1945

== Cavalry divisions ==
- 30th Cavalry Division, Soviet Union

== Armoured units ==
- 30th Guards Tank Division, Soviet Union
- 30th Tank Division (Soviet Union)
- 30th Armored Division (United States)

== Aviation divisions ==
- 30th Fighter Division, Luftwaffe, Germany
- 30th Air Division, United States

== Navy divisions ==
- 30th Naval Surface Ships Division, Ukraine

== See also ==
- List of military divisions by number
- 30th Army (disambiguation)
- XXX Corps (disambiguation)
- 30th Brigade (disambiguation)
- 30th Regiment (disambiguation)
- 30th Battalion (disambiguation)
- 30th Squadron (disambiguation)
