= Church and 29th Street / Church and Day stations =

Light rail stops in San Francisco, California, US

Church and 29th Street Church and Day Street
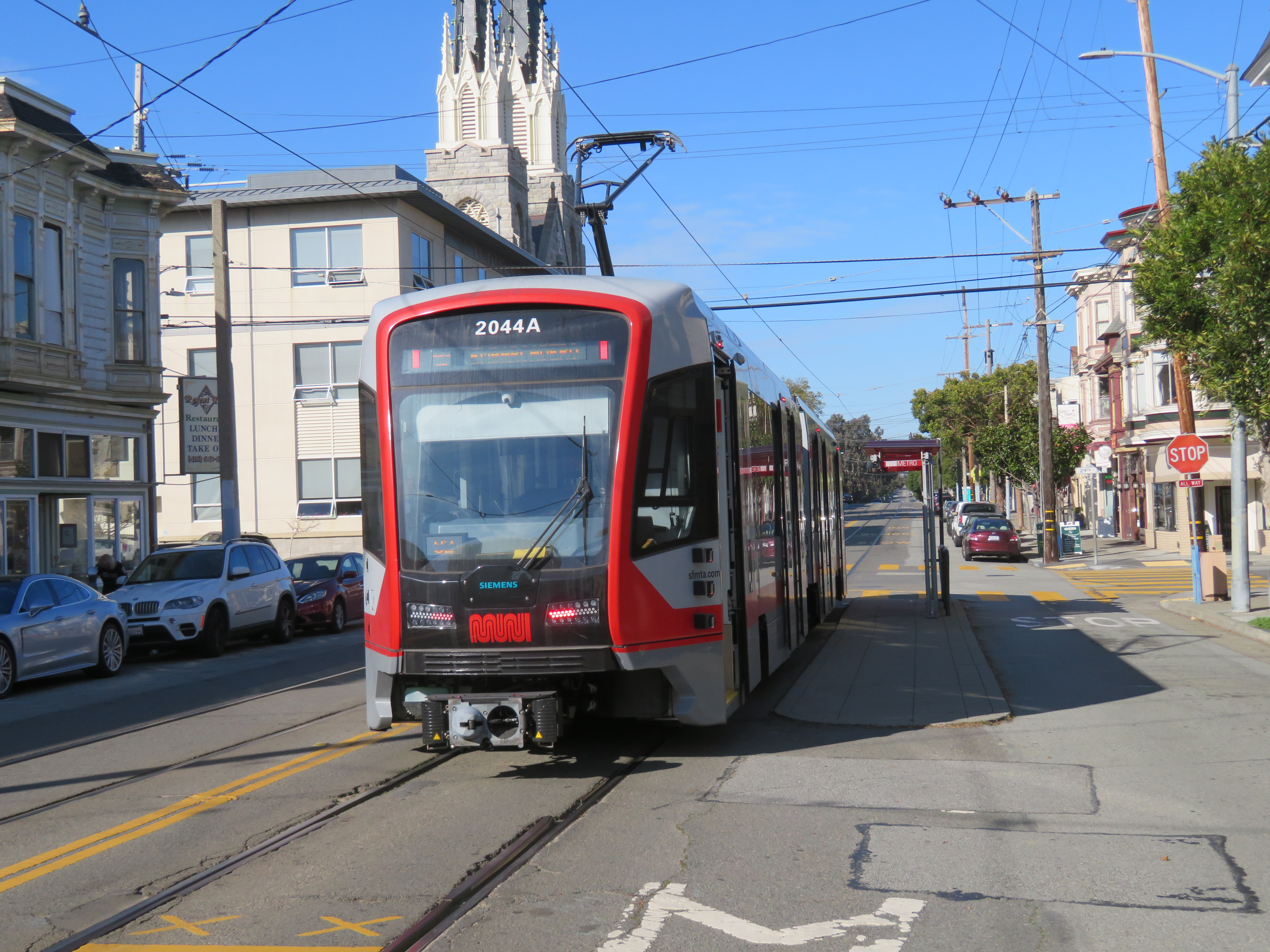
- Eastbound train at Church and 29th Street in January 2019

General information
- Location: Church Street at 29th Street and Day Street; San Francisco, California
- Coordinates: 37.74403°N 122.42669°W
- Platforms: 2 side platforms
- Tracks: 2

Construction
- Accessible: Yes

History
- Opened: August 11, 1917
- Rebuilt: 1997

Services
| Preceding station | Muni | Following station |
|---|---|---|
| 30th Street and Dolores toward Balboa Park | J Church | Church and 28th Street toward Embarcadero |
| Church and 30th Street One-way operation | J Church | Church and 28th Street toward Embarcadero |
Location

Church and 29th Street / Church and Day stations are a pair of light rail stops on the Muni Metro J Church line, located in the Noe Valley neighborhood of San Francisco, California. The eastbound (inbound) stop is located on Church Street at 29th Street, while westbound trains stop on Church Street at Day Street. The stops opened with the line on August 11, 1917. Until the 1991 extension to Balboa Park station, the line's outer terminus was just to the south at 30th Street. The station has two side platforms in the middle of Church Street (traffic islands) where passengers board or depart from trains. The station also has mini-high platforms providing access to people with disabilities.

== History ==
In March 2014, Muni released details of the proposed implementation of their Transit Effectiveness Project (later rebranded MuniForward), which included a variety of stop changes for the J Church line. No changes were proposed for the stops at 29th Avenue and Day. In 2020, Muni proposed to close the inbound stop at 29th Street in favor of the stop at 30th Street.

== Bus service ==
The stop is also served by the J Bus route which provides service along the J Church line during the early morning when trains do not operate.
