= San Jose and Randall station =

Muni Metro light rail stop in San Francisco

San Jose and Randall
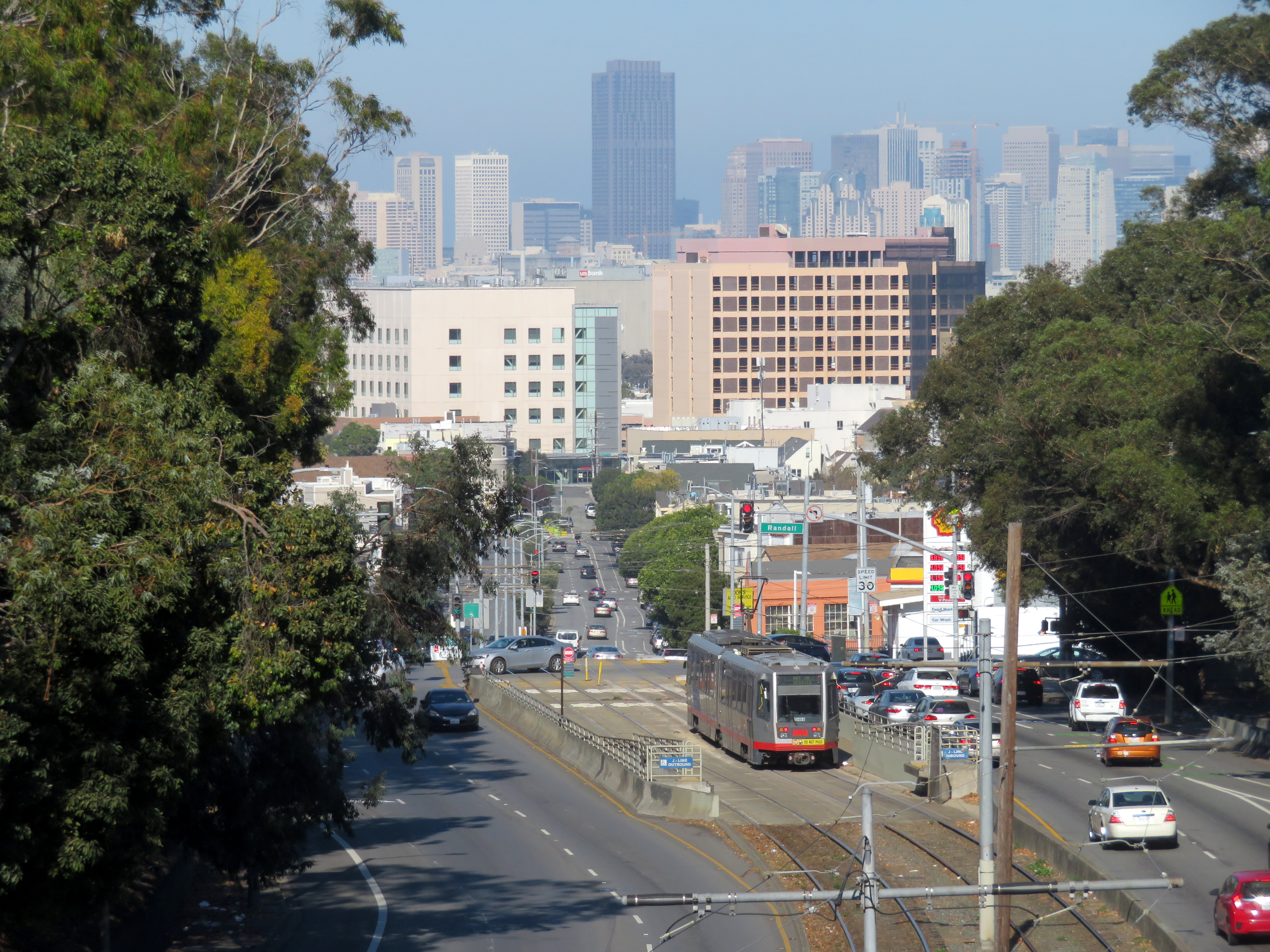
- Eastbound train at San Jose and Randall in November 2019

General information
- Location: San Jose Avenue at Randall Street; San Francisco, California
- Coordinates: 37°44′23″N 122°25′27″W
- Platforms: 2 side platforms
- Tracks: 2
- Connections: Muni: 14, 49

Construction
- Accessible: Yes

History
- Opened: August 31, 1991

Services
Preceding station	Muni	Following station
San Jose/Glen Park toward Balboa Park	J Church	30th Street and Dolores toward Embarcadero
Location

San Jose and Randall station is a light rail stop on the Muni Metro J Church line, located in the median of San Jose Avenue at the north end of the Bernal Cut in the Bernal Heights neighborhood of San Francisco, California. The stop has two side platforms, each with an accessible mini-high platform.

== Background ==
The stop is also served by bus routes 14 and 49 plus the J Bus route which provides service along the J Church line during the early morning when trains do not operate.

J Church and N Judah trains began using the extension of the J Church line along San Jose Avenue for carhouse moves on August 31, 1991. Although these trips were open to passengers, the extension and its stops did not open for full-time service until June 19, 1993.

In March 2014, Muni released details of the proposed implementation of their Transit Effectiveness Project (later rebranded MuniForward), which included a variety of stop changes for the J Church line. No changes were proposed for San Jose and Randall.
