= Church and 28th Street station =

Light rail stop in San Francisco, California

Church and 28th Street
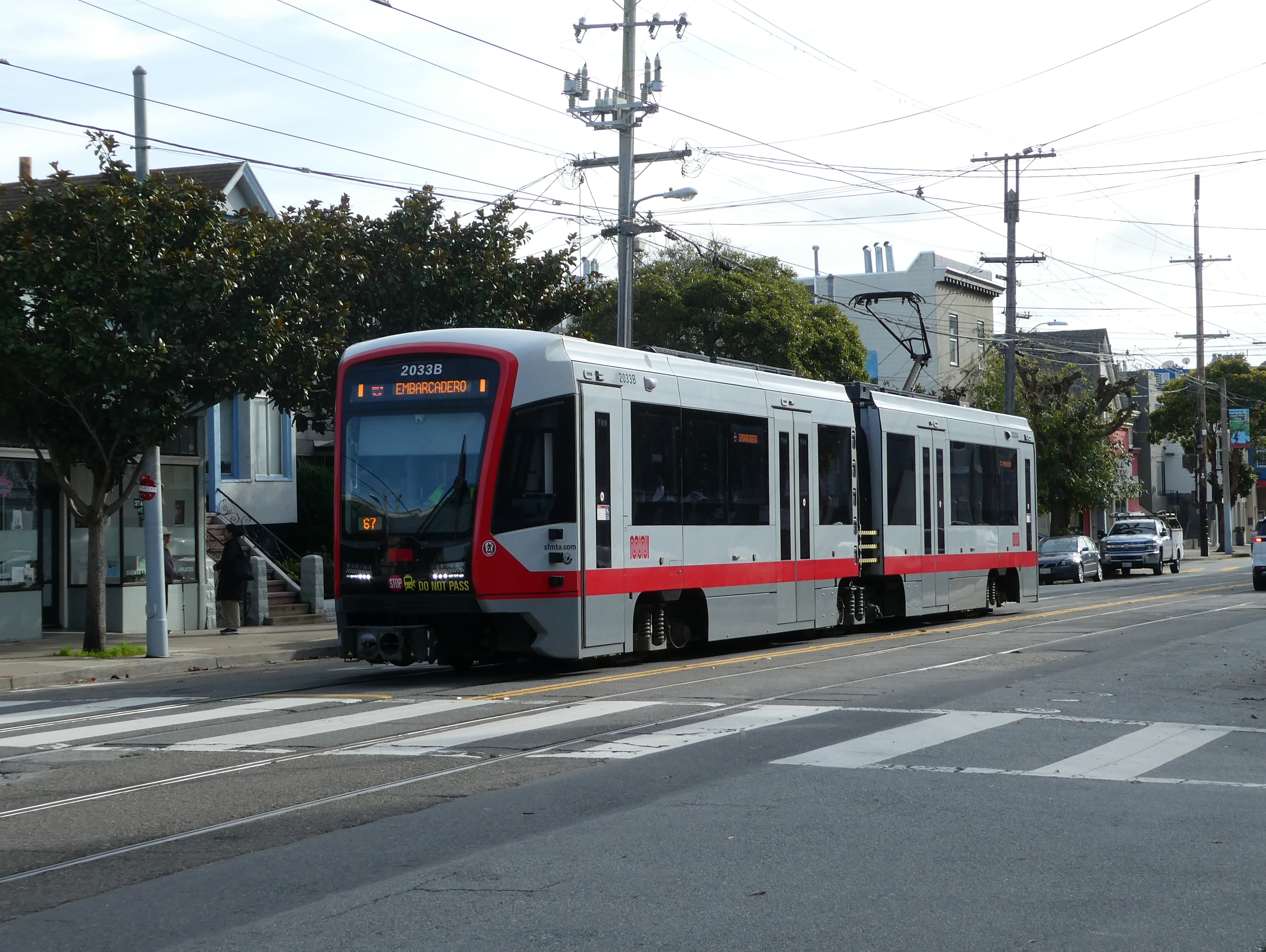
- An inbound train at the stop in 2025

General information
- Location: Church Street at 28th Street; San Francisco, California
- Coordinates: 37.74531°N 122.42685°W
- Platforms: None; passengers wait on sidewalk
- Tracks: 2

Construction
- Accessible: No

History
- Opened: August 11, 1917
- Rebuilt: November 25, 2024

Services
Preceding station	Muni	Following station
Church and 29th/Day Streets toward Balboa Park	J Church	Church and 26th Street toward Embarcadero
Location

Church and 28th Street is a light rail stop on the Muni Metro J Church line, located in the Noe Valley neighborhood of San Francisco, California. The stop has no platforms, trains stop at marked poles before crossing 28th Street and passengers cross a parking lane on Church Street to board trains. The stop is not accessible.

== History ==
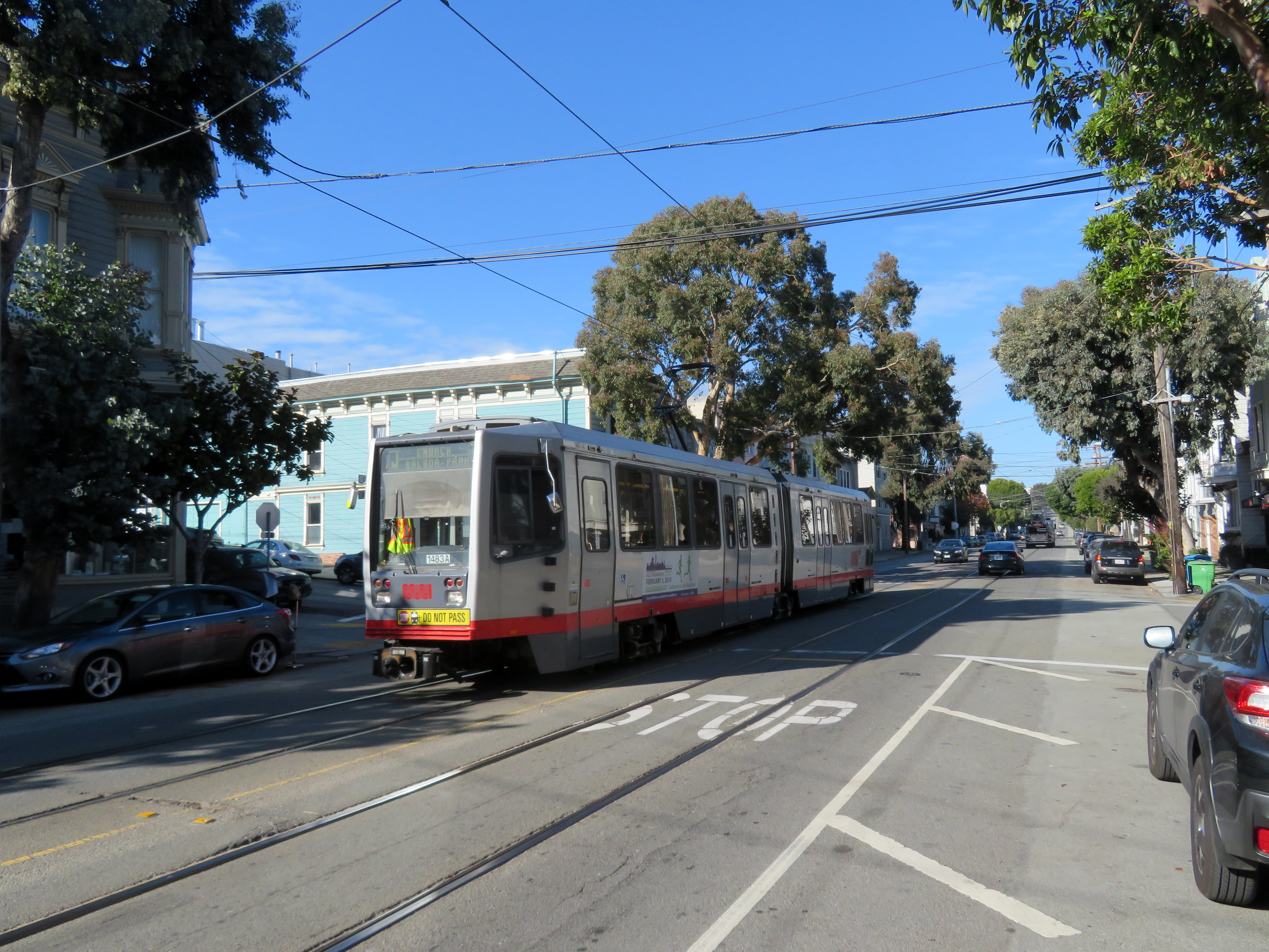
An outbound train at 27th Street in 2019

The J Church line opened on August 11, 1917. By the early 2010s, trains stopped at Church and 27th Street. In March 2014, Muni released details of the proposed implementation of their Transit Effectiveness Project (later rebranded MuniForward), which included a variety of stop changes for the J Church line. Under that plan, bulb-outs were to be built to serve as platforms for the 27th Street stop. A more limited preliminary project announced in November 2019 was to include some modifications to the stop.

In October 2024, the SFMTA board approved plans to relocate the stop one block south to 28th Avenue in conjunction with the addition of stop signs there. The stop was planned to be moved – along with the stop at Clipper moving to 26th – by the end of 2024. The stop was moved effective November 25, 2024.
