= San Jose/Glen Park station =

Muni Metro light rail stop in San Francisco

San Jose/Glen Park
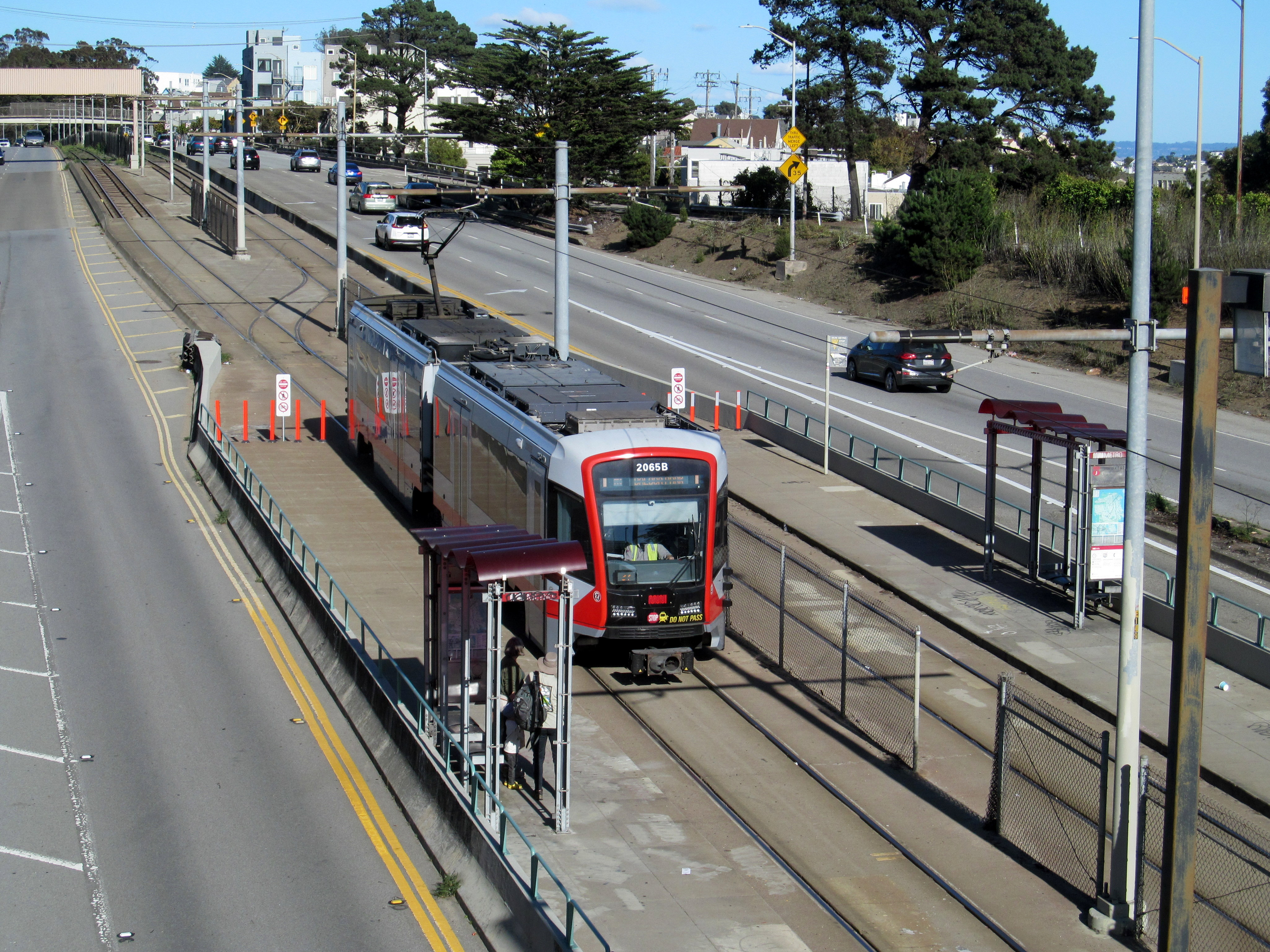
- An outbound train at the station in October 2025

General information
- Location: San Jose Avenue at Diamond Street; San Francisco, California
- Coordinates: 37.7324°N 122.4338°W
- Platforms: 2 side platforms
- Tracks: 2
- Connections: At Glen Park station: BART; Muni: 23, 36, 44, 52, 714, J Bus

Construction
- Accessible: No

History
- Opened: August 31, 1991

Services
Preceding station	Muni	Following station
San Jose and Santa Rosa toward Balboa Park	J Church	San Jose and Randall toward Embarcadero
Location

San Jose/Glen Park station is a light rail stop on the Muni Metro J Church line, located in the Glen Park neighborhood of San Francisco, California. The station is located in the median of the freeway section of San Jose Avenue. A footbridge connects the two side platforms to surface streets and Glen Park station.

== Background ==
Glen Park station is also served by BART trains, along with bus routes 23, 36, 44, 52, BART Early Bird Express route 714 and the J Bus which provides service along the J Church line during the early morning when trains do not operate.

J Church and N Judah trains began using the extension of the J Church line along San Jose Avenue for carhouse moves on August 31, 1991. Although these trips were open to passengers, the extension and its stops did not open for full-time service until June 19, 1993.

In March 2014, Muni released details of the proposed implementation of their Transit Effectiveness Project (later rebranded MuniForward), which included a variety of stop changes for the J Church line. No changes were proposed for San Jose/Glen Park.
