= 30th Street and Dolores station =

Muni Metro light rail stop in San Francisco

30th Street and Dolores
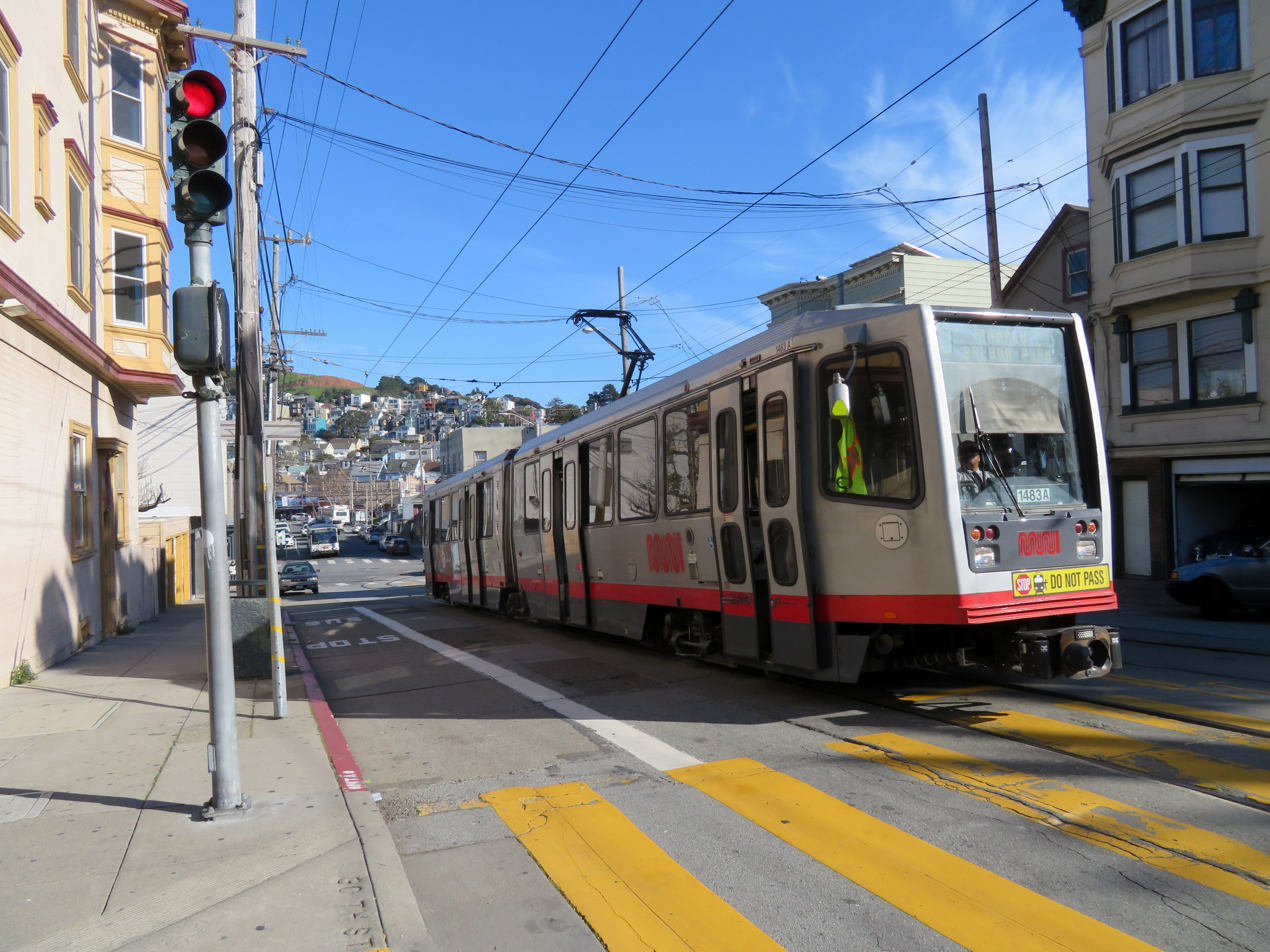
- Eastbound train at 30th Street and Dolores in January 2019

General information
- Location: 30th Street at Dolores Street; San Francisco, California
- Coordinates: 37°44′32″N 122°25′27″W
- Platforms: None, passengers wait on sidewalk
- Tracks: 2
- Connections: Muni: 24

Construction
- Accessible: No

History
- Opened: August 31, 1991

Services
Preceding station	Muni	Following station
San Jose and Randall toward Balboa Park	J Church	Church and 30th Street toward Embarcadero
San Jose and Randall toward Balboa Park	J Church	Church and Day One-way operation
Location

30th Street and Dolores station is a light rail stop on the Muni Metro J Church line, located in the Bernal Heights neighborhood of San Francisco, California. The stop has no platforms, trains stop at marked poles before the crossing Dolores Street and passengers cross a vehicle travel lanes on 30th Street to board trains. The stop is not accessible to people with disabilities.

The stop is also served by bus route 24 plus the J Bus which provides service along the J Church line during the early morning when trains do not operate.

== History ==
The San Francisco and San Mateo Electric Railway (SF&SM), later part of the Market Street Railway system, began operation on April 27, 1892. The line ran on 30th Street between Guerrero Street and Chenery Street. After the 1906 San Francisco earthquake, the URR rerouted the San Mateo line to Mission Street; Embarcadero–Daly City route 26 and Embarcadero–Sunnyside route 10 continued to operate on the ex-SF&SM on Church Street. Service on Church over the former SF&SM route ended on January 27, 1940, when route 10 was discontinued.

J Church and N Judah trains began using an extension of the J Church line along 30th Street and San Jose Avenue for carhouse moves on August 31, 1991. Although these trips were open to passengers, the extension and its stops did not open for full-time service until June 19, 1993.

In March 2014, Muni released details of the proposed implementation of their Transit Effectiveness Project (later rebranded MuniForward), which included a variety of stop changes for the J Church line. Transit bulbs would be added at 30th Street and Dolores so that passengers would no longer have to cross a lane of traffic to board trains. A more limited preliminary project announced in November 2019 will include some modifications to the stop.
