= Glen Park station =

Rapid transit station in San Francisco

Glen Park
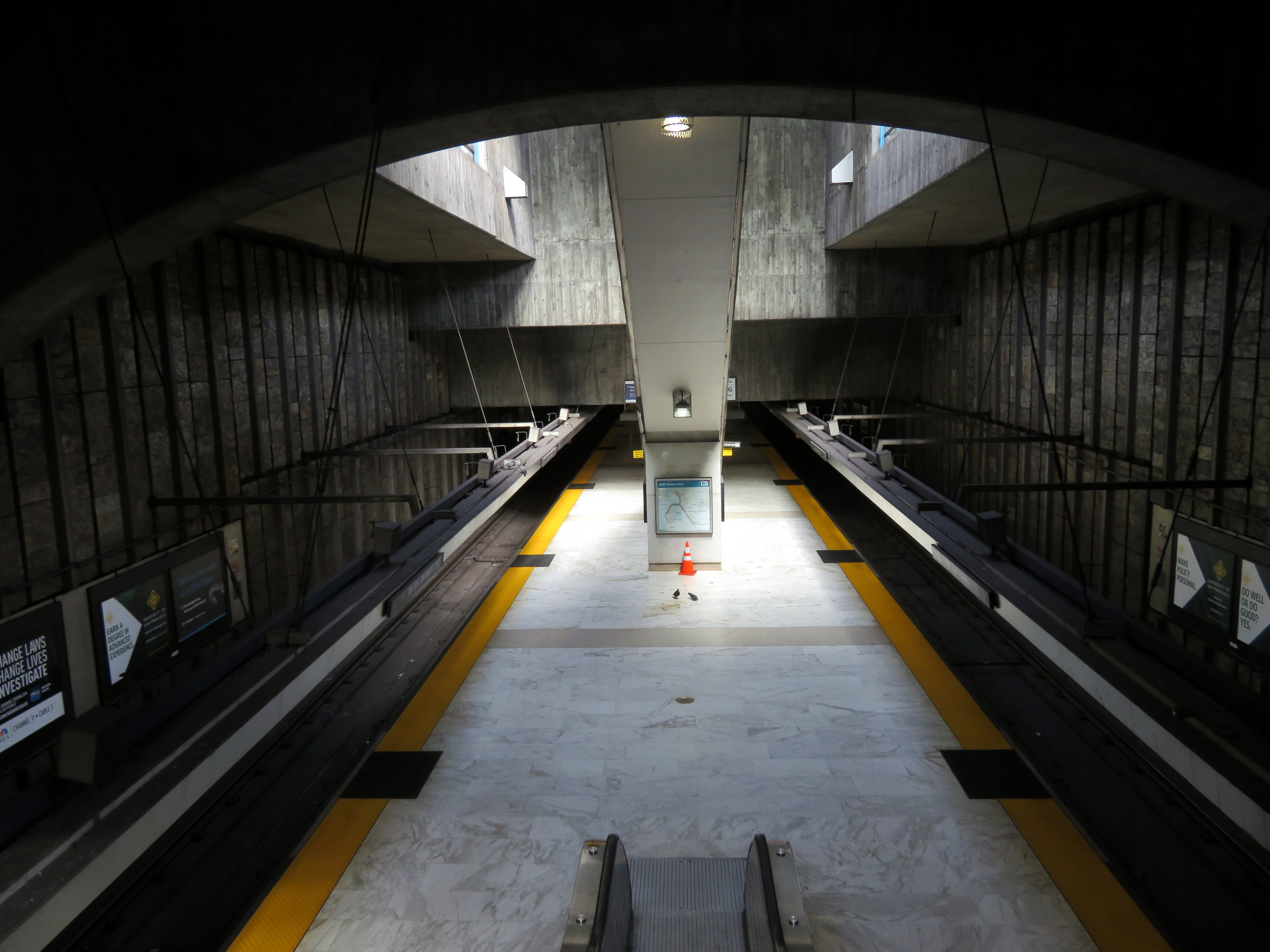
- Glen Park station platform in March 2018

General information
- Location: 2901 Diamond Street; San Francisco, California
- Coordinates: 37.733118°N 122.433808°W
- Line: BART M-Line
- Platforms: 1 island platform
- Tracks: 2
- Connections: Muni: 23, 35, 36, 44, 52, 714; at San Jose/Glen Park

Construction
- Structure type: Underground
- Parking: 53 spaces
- Cycle facilities: 12 lockers
- Accessible: Yes
- Architect: Ernest Born; Corlett & Spackman

Other information
- Station code: BART: GLEN

History
- Opened: November 5, 1973

Passengers
- 2026: 3,778 (weekday average)

Services
Preceding station	Bay Area Rapid Transit	Following station
Balboa Park toward Daly City	Blue Line	24th Street Mission toward Dublin/Pleasanton
Balboa Park toward Daly City	Green Line	24th Street Mission toward Berryessa
Balboa Park toward Millbrae	Red Line	24th Street Mission toward Richmond
Balboa Park toward SFO or Millbrae	Yellow Line	24th Street Mission toward Antioch via Pittsburg/Bay Point
- Glen Park BART Station
- U.S. National Register of Historic Places
- Area: 1.31 acres (0.53 ha)
- NRHP reference No.: 100004531
- Added to NRHP: October 21, 2019
Location

Glen Park station is an underground Bay Area Rapid Transit (BART) station located in the Glen Park neighborhood of San Francisco, California. The station is adjacent to San Jose Avenue and Interstate 280. The station is served by the Red, Yellow, Green, and Blue lines.

San Jose/Glen Park station on the Muni Metro J Church line is located nearby in the median of San Jose Avenue.

== Design ==
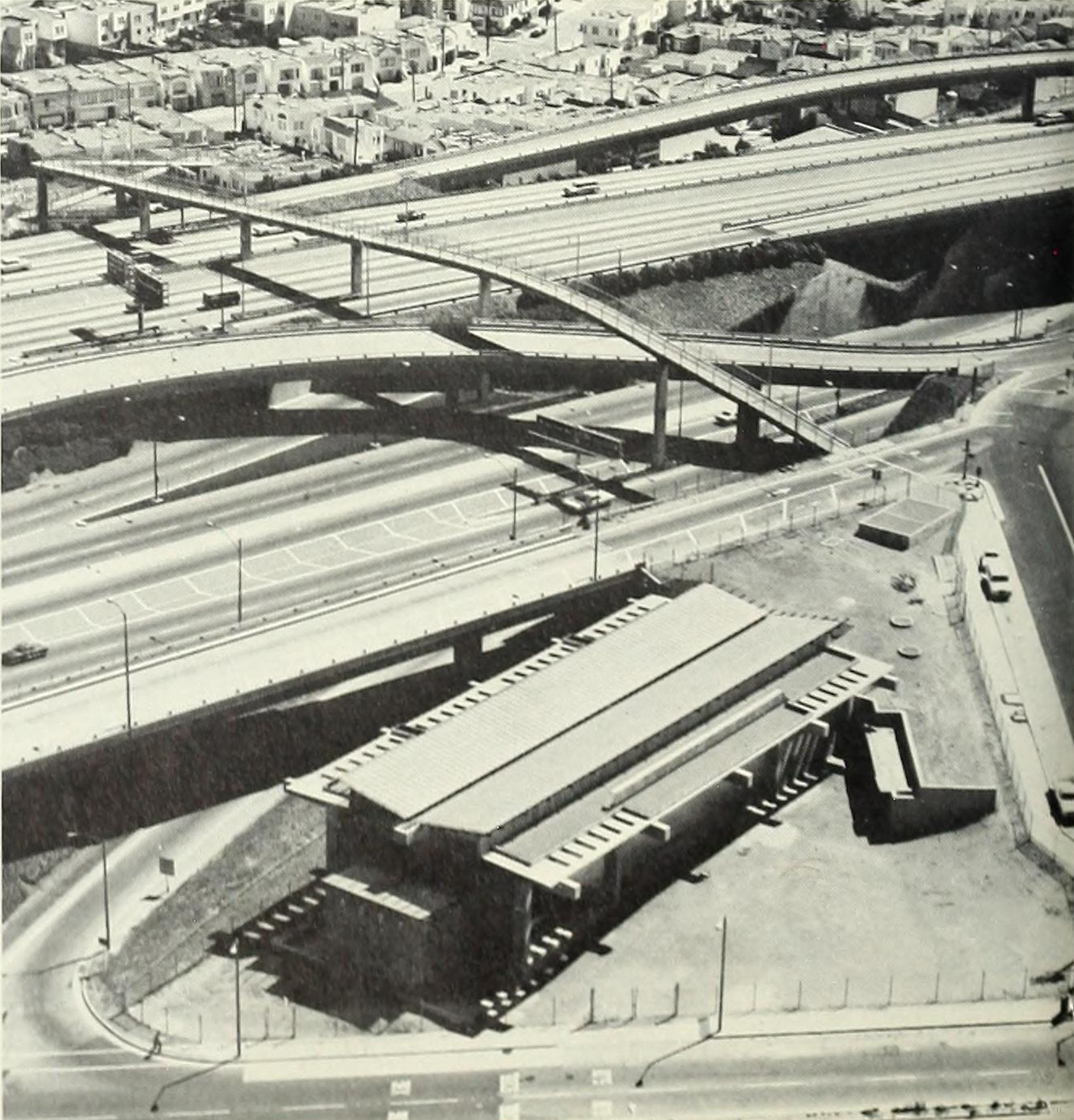
Glen Park station under construction in 1970

The station was designed by the firm of Corlett & Spackman and architect Ernest Born in the brutalist style. Born also designed the graphics for the entire BART system. The BART Board approved the name "Glen Park" in December 1965. Service began on November 5, 1973. The November 1974 Architectural Record wrote of the station:

The dramatic volume of the station–one of the deepest in the system–unfolds at the escalator wells, where the full height (60 feet or 18 m) of the structure is visible. During the day, daylight from the skylights, one over the mezzanine, the other over the end escalator, pours in to the lower platform, an extraordinary sight in a subway.

Born designed a marble mural at the west end of the mezzanine. "100 pieces, few of which are cut at right angles, in warm brown and red-brown tones, make it up". The mural is prominently featured in a scene of the 2006 Will Smith film The Pursuit of Happyness.

The station was nominated in 2019 to be listed on the National Register of Historic Places. The Glen Park Association submitted the application, funded by a grant from San Francisco Heritage, whose president called the station "the best example of Brutalism in San Francisco, if not the entire Bay Area."

As of 2024, BART indicates "significant market, local support, and/or implementation barriers" that must be overcome to allow transit-oriented development on the surface parking lot at the station. Such development would not begin until at least the mid-2030s.

== See also ==
- List of Bay Area Rapid Transit stations
