= Thirtieth of the month =

Recurring ordinal calendar date

The thirtieth of the month or thirtieth day of the month is the recurring calendar date position corresponding to the day numbered 30 of each month. In the Gregorian calendar (and other calendars that number days sequentially within a month), this day occurs in every month of the year except February, and therefore occurs eleven times per year. In four months of the year—April, June, September, and November—it is the last day of the month.

- Thirtieth of January
- Thirtieth of February, found rarely on nonstandard calendars
- Thirtieth of March
- Thirtieth of April
- Thirtieth of May
- Thirtieth of June
- Thirtieth of July
- Thirtieth of August
- Thirtieth of September
- Thirtieth of October
- Thirtieth of November
- Thirtieth of December

In addition to these dates, this date occurs in months of many other calendars, such as the Bengali calendar and the Hebrew calendar.

== See also ==
- 30th (disambiguation)
