= 30th Street station (disambiguation) =

30th Street Station is an Amtrak, SEPTA Regional Rail, and NJ Transit railroad station in Philadelphia, Pennsylvania.

30th Street station may also refer to:

- Drexel Station at 30th Street, an underground transit station in Philadelphia, Pennsylvania
- 30th Street Station District, a proposed urban development in West Philadelphia, Pennsylvania
- 30th Street station (IRT Ninth Avenue Line), a former subway station in New York City, New York
- 30th Street and Dolores station, a light rail stop in San Francisco, California
- Church and 30th Street station, a light rail stop in San Francisco, California
