= 30th Street =

30th Street may refer to:

- 30th Street (San Diego), California
- 30th Street (Manhattan)
- 30th Street Station, Philadelphia
- 30th Street station (disambiguation), stations with the name 30th Street
