= San Jose and Ocean station =

Muni Metro light rail stop in San Francisco

San Jose and Ocean
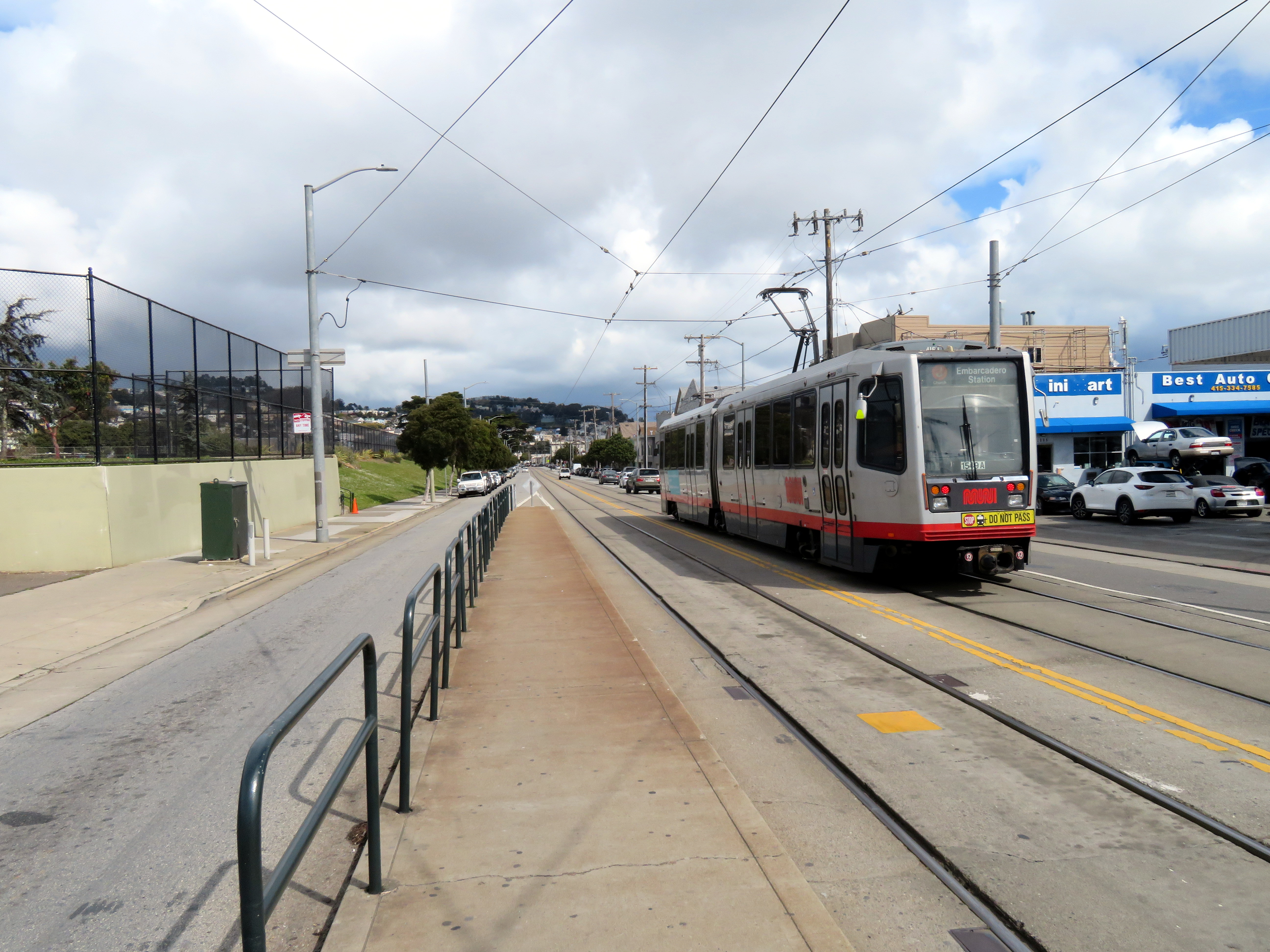
- Eastbound train passing the westbound platform in March 2018

General information
- Location: San Jose Avenue at Ocean Avenue; San Francisco, California
- Coordinates: 37.72293°N 122.44481°W
- Platforms: 2 side platforms
- Tracks: 2
- Connections: Muni: 29, 49

Construction
- Accessible: No

History
- Opened: August 31, 1991

Services
Preceding station	Muni	Following station
Balboa Park Terminus	J Church	San Jose and Santa Ynez toward Embarcadero
Former services
Preceding station	Muni	Following station
Balboa Park Terminus	K Ingleside (stop closed 2015)	Ocean Avenue/CCSF Pedestrian Bridge toward Sunnydale
Location

San Jose and Ocean station is a light rail stop on the Muni Metro J Church line, located in the Mission Terrace neighborhood of San Francisco, California adjacent to the Balboa Park neighborhood and the Balboa Park station complex. The station has two side platforms in the middle of San Jose Avenue (traffic islands) located before the intersection in each direction. The station is not accessible.

== History ==
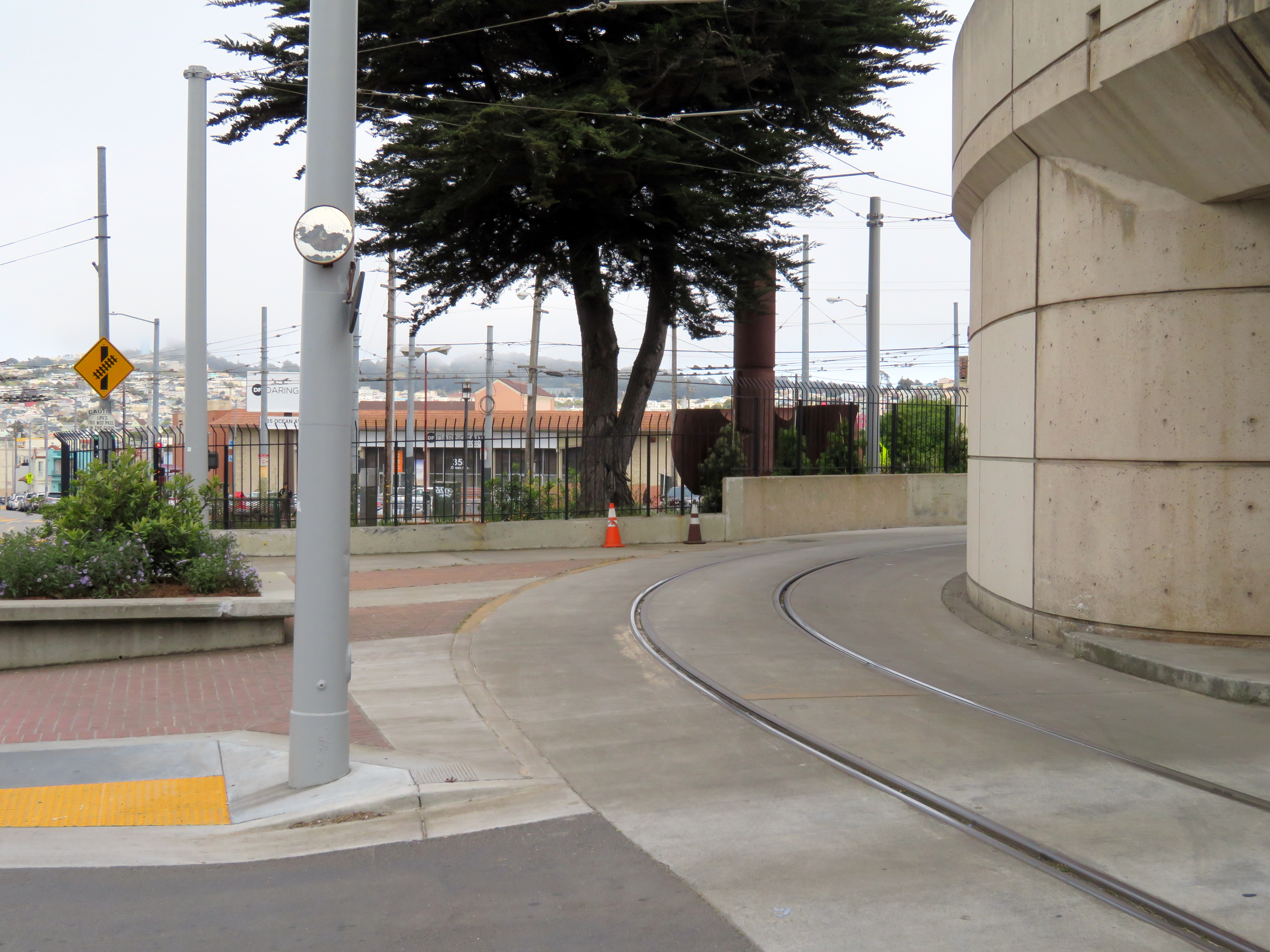
Former stop for the K Ingleside near San Jose and Ocean

J Church and N Judah trains began using the extension of the line along San Jose Avenue for carhouse moves on August 31, 1991. Although these trips were open to passengers, the extension and its stops did not open for full-time J Church service until June 19, 1993. K Ingleside trains formerly stopped inside the yard loop at San Jose and Ocean. The stop was discontinued on April 25, 2015, due to the opening of the new accessible boarding platform at Balboa Park two days later.

In March 2014, Muni released details of the proposed implementation of their Transit Effectiveness Project (later rebranded MuniForward), which included a variety of stop changes for the J Church line. No changes were proposed for San Jose and Ocean. J Church Safety and Accessibility Project work approved in October 2023 likewise does not call for any changes to the stop, though transit-only lanes will be installed from Ocean Avenue northward.
