= 30th Troop Carrier Squadron =

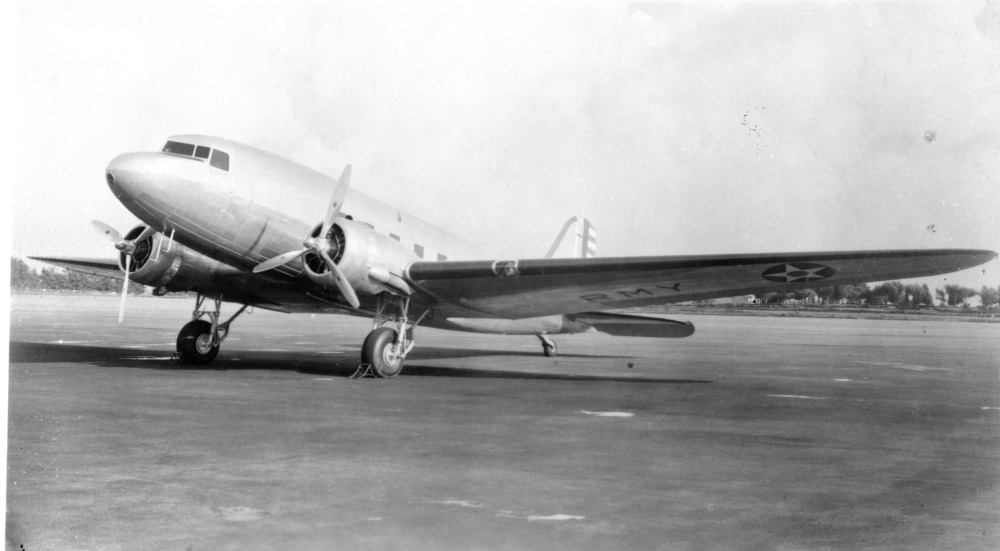
- Douglas C-49
- Active: 1942–1944; 1949–1951
- Country: United States
- Branch: United States Air Force
- Role: Airlift

Insignia
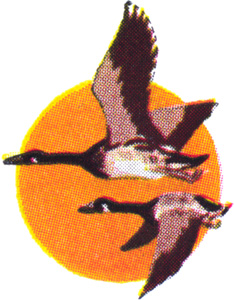
- 30th Troop Carrier Squadron emblem (Note: Approved 9 January 1943.)

The 30th Troop Carrier Squadron is an inactive United States Air Force unit. It was established in January 1942 as the 30th Transport Squadron and served as a training unit for I Troop Carrier Command until disbanding in a general reorganization of Army Air Forces training units in 1944. The squadron was reconstituted in the reserves in 1949 and served until May 1951, when it was called to active duty for the Korean War. It was then inactivated, and its personnel were assigned to other units.

== History ==
=== World War II ===
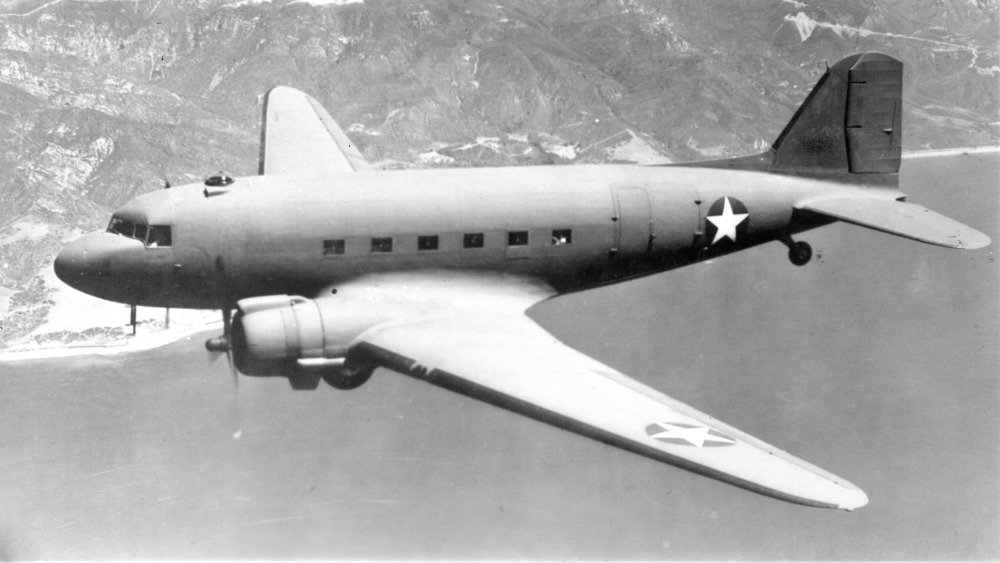
Douglas C-47 Skytrain

The squadron was first activated at Drew Field, Florida on 2 March 1942, as one of the three original squadrons of the 314th Transport Group. In June 1942, the squadron moved to Camp Williams Army Air Field, Wisconsin. Shortly after its arrival, it was assigned to the 89th Transport Group, which moved to Camp Williams from Harding Field, Louisiana. It was equipped with a variety of Douglas DC-3 airliners that had been impressed into military service and designated C-49 or C-50 and with Douglas C-53 Skytroopers.

The squadron's initial mission was transition training for qualified pilots who had not flown the Douglas transports. In July 1942, the squadron was redesignated the 30th Troop Carrier Squadron, but its mission remained the same. The squadron moved its operations to Sedalia Army Air Field, Missouri in September 1942 and to Del Valle Airfield, Texas in December. In 1943, it standardized its equipment with the Douglas C-47 Skytrain replacing its previous mixture of Douglas transports.

By February 1944 most combat units had been activated and almost three-quarters of them had deployed overseas. With the exception of special programs, like forming Boeing B-29 Superfortress units, training "fillers" for existing units became more important. Reflecting this change, the squadron mission changed in March 1944, when it became a Replacement Training Unit (RTU). The RTU program used oversized units to train individual pilots and aircrews.

However, the Army Air Forces (AAF) was finding that standard military units like the 30th, whose manning was based on relatively inflexible tables of organization were not well adapted to the training mission, even more so to the replacement mission. Accordingly, the AAF adopted a more functional system in which each base was organized into a separate numbered unit. The 89th Group, along with its operational squadrons and support units at what was now Bergstrom Field were disbanded and their personnel and equipment were transferred to the new 807th AAF Base Unit (Combat Crew Training School, Troop Carrier).

=== Reserve operations ===
The squadron was reconstituted in 1949 and activated in the reserves at Hanscom Airport on 27 July 1949, as Continental Air Command reorganized its operational units under the Wing Base Organization. The squadron was again assigned to the 89th Group, which under the new organization, formed part of the 89th Troop Carrier Wing, which assumed the assets of the inactivating 310th Bombardment Group.

At Hanscom, squadron training was supervised by the 2234th Air Force Reserve Training Center and the squadron was only manned at 25% of normal strength. All reserve combat and corollary units were mobilized for the Korean War. The 30th was called up on 1 May 1951. Squadron personnel were used as fillers to bring other units up to strength and unit aircraft were distributed to other organizations as well. The squadron was inactivated on 10 May.

== Lineage ==
- Constituted as the 30th Transport Squadron on 28 January 1942

Activated on 2 March 1942
Redesignated 30th Troop Carrier Squadron on 4 July 1942
Disbanded on 14 April 1944

- Reconstituted as the 30th Troop Carrier Squadron, Medium on 10 May 1949

Activated in the reserve on 27 June 1949.
Ordered into active service on 1 May 1951
Inactivated on 10 May 1951

=== Assignments ===
- 314th Transport Group, 2 March 1942
- 89th Transport Group (later 89th Troop Carrier Group), 15 June 1942 – 14 April 1944
- 89th Troop Carrier Group, 27 June 1949 – 10 May 1951

=== Stations ===
- Drew Field, Florida, 2 March 1942
- Camp Williams Army Air Field, Wisconsin, c. 10 June 1942
- Sedalia Army Air Field, Missouri, 10 September 1942
- Del Valle Airfield (later Bergstrom Field), 16 December 1942 – 14 April 1944
- Hanscom Airport (later Bedford Air Field, Hanscom Field), Massachusetts, 27 June 1949 – 10 May 1951

=== Aircraft ===
- Douglas DC-3 (as C-49, C-50 and C-53), 1942–1943
- Douglas C-47 Skytrain, 1943–1944

=== Campaign ===
Campaign Streamer	Campaign	Dates	Notes
	American Theater without inscription	1 February 1942 – 14 April 1944	30th Transport Squadron (later 30th Troop Carrier Squadron)
