= 30th Division (1st Formation) (People's Republic of China) =

30th Division (1949–1952)
- Active: 1949.6 - 1952.4
- Country: People's Republic of China
- Branch: People's Liberation Army
- Type: Division
- Role: Infantry
- Part of: 10th Corps
- Engagements: Chinese Civil War

The 30th Division (Chinese: 第30师) was created in June 1949 under the Regulation of the Redesignations of All Organizations and Units of the Army, issued by the Central Military Commission on November 1, 1948, basing on Independent Division of Wanbei Military District. Its history could be traced to the Independent Brigade of Wanbei Military District formed in June 1948.

The division was a part of PLA 10th Corps, under the flag of 30th Division it took part in the Chinese Civil War.

In April 1950 the division was detached and moved to Jinxi for coast defense missions.

In April 1952 the division was disbanded and transferred to the Navy.

As of its disbandment, the division was composed of:

- 88th Regiment;
- 89th Regiment (latter as 1st Regiment, Marine Corps);
- 90th Regiment (latter as 1st Regiment, 1st Naval Aviation Division).
