= Church and 30th Street station =

Light rail stop in San Francisco, California, US

Church and 30th Street
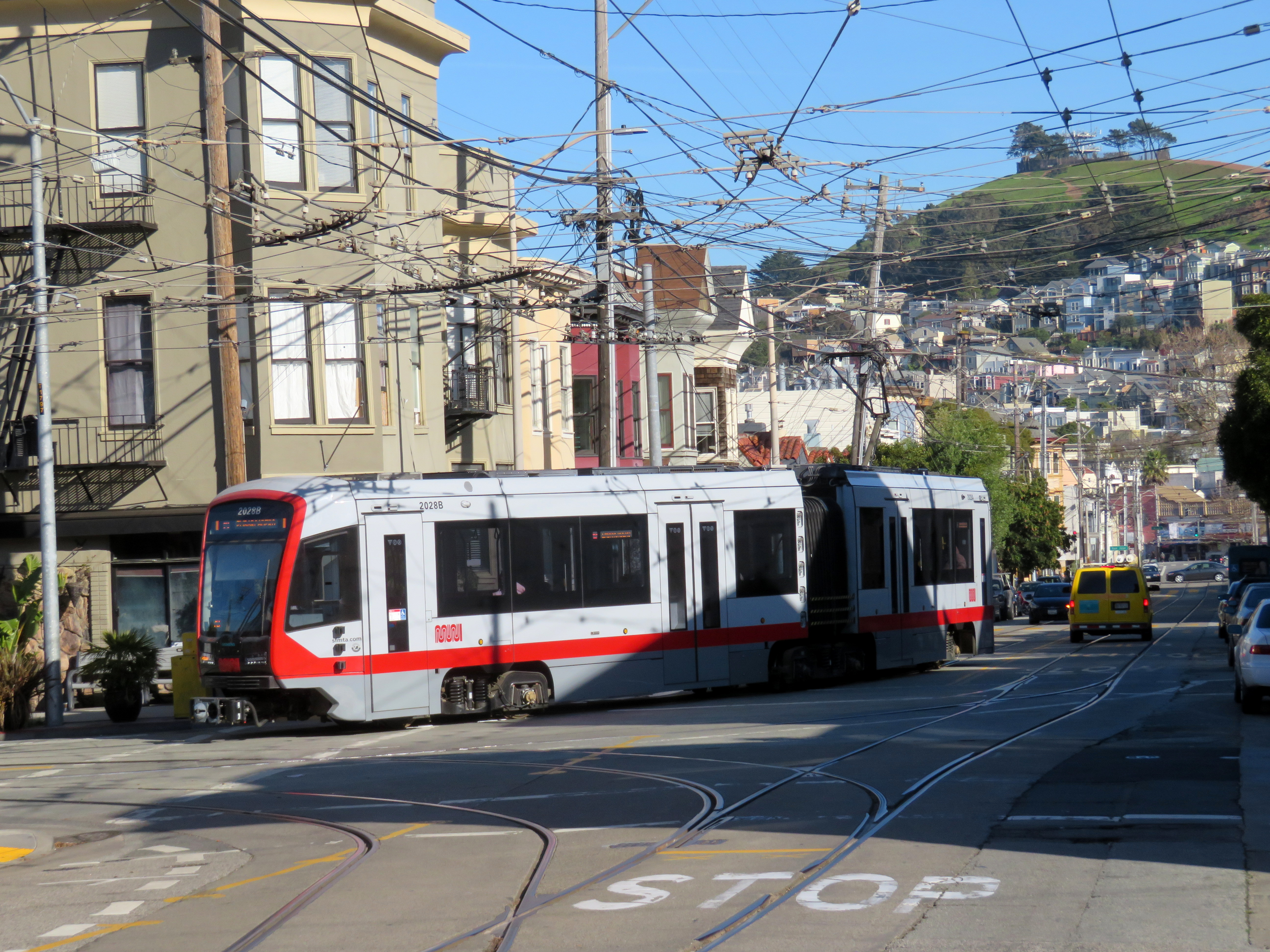
- Eastbound train turning onto Church from 30th Street in January 2019

General information
- Location: Church Street at 30th Street; San Francisco, California
- Coordinates: 37°44′32″N 122°25′35″W
- Platforms: None, passengers wait on sidewalk
- Tracks: 2
- Connections: Muni: 24

Construction
- Accessible: No

History
- Opened: August 11, 1917

Services
Preceding station	Muni	Following station
30th Street and Dolores One-way operation	J Church (inbound)	Church and 29th Street toward Embarcadero
Location

Church and 30th Street station is a one-way light rail stop on the Muni Metro J Church line, located in the Noe Valley neighborhood of San Francisco, California. The stop is only served by inbound trains; outbound trains stop further north at Day Street. The stop has no platforms, trains stop at marked poles and passengers cross a vehicle travel lanes to board trains. The stop is not accessible to people with disabilities.

The stop is also served by bus route 24 plus the J Bus which provides service along the J Church line during the early morning when trains do not operate.

== History ==
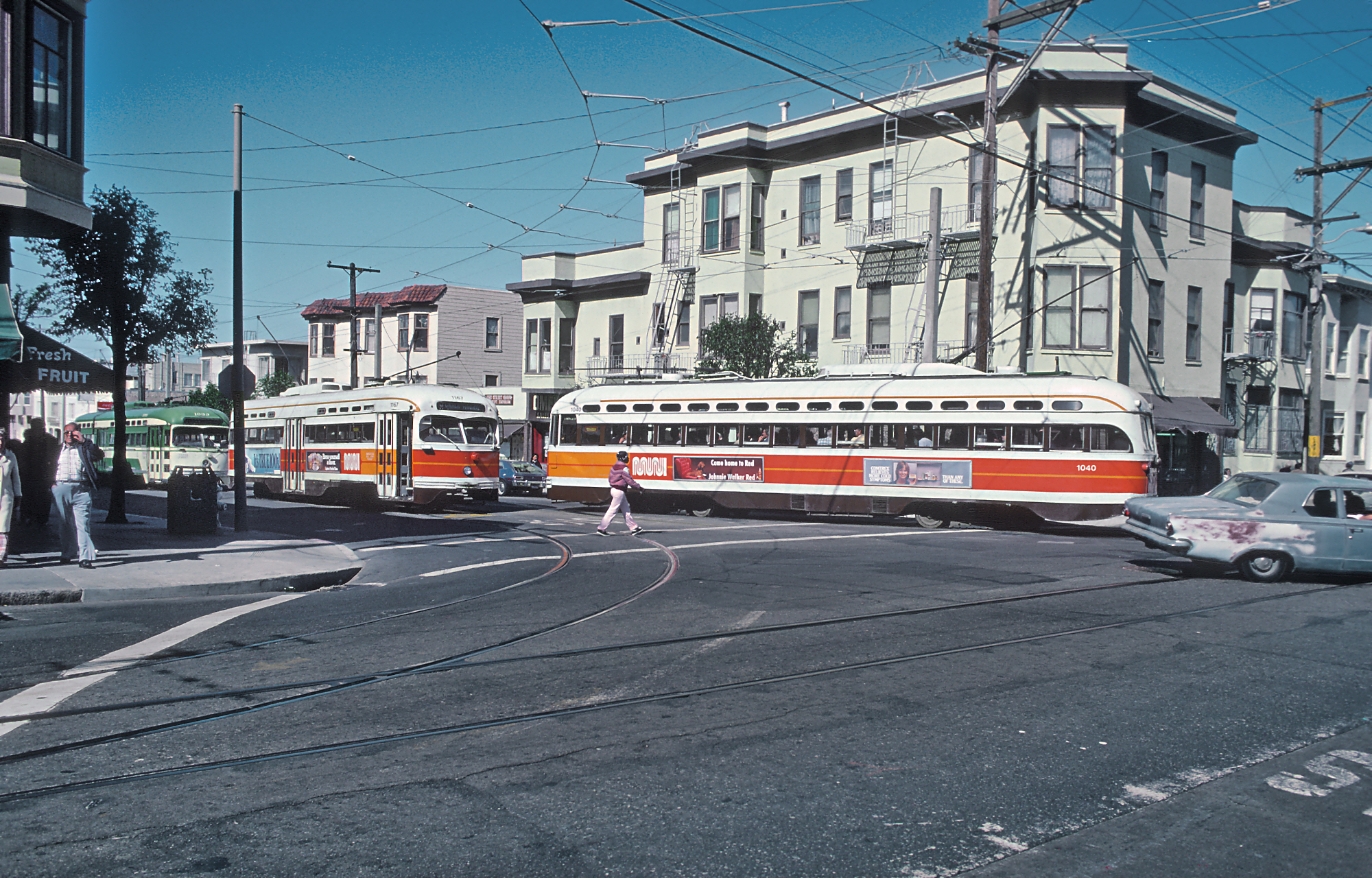
Streetcars at 30th Street in 1981

The San Francisco and San Mateo Electric Railway (SF&SM), later part of the Market Street Railway system, began operation on April 27, 1892. The line ran on 30th Street between Guerrero Street and Chenery Street, just east of Church Street. After the 1906 San Francisco earthquake, the URR rerouted the San Mateo line to Mission Street; Embarcadero–Daly City route 26 and Embarcadero–Sunnyside route 10 continued to operate on the ex-SF&SM on Church Street. The San Francisco Municipal Railway opened its J Church line on August 11, 1917. The outer terminus of the line was at 30th Street, where a crossover was located to allow streetcars to reverse direction. Service on 30th Street over the former SF&SM route ended on January 27, 1940, when route 10 was discontinued.

In 1951–52, Muni acquired a fleet of new PCC streetcars – the first Muni streetcars with a cab at only one end. These single-ended cars required a loop or wye to turn around at terminals, as they could not simply reverse direction. A wye was constructed at Church and 30th Street; it was put in service on December 22, 1957, allowing PCC streetcars to enter J Church service.

J Church and N Judah trains began using the extension of the J Church line along 30th Street and San Jose Avenue for carhouse moves on August 31, 1991. Although these trips were open to passengers, the extension and its stops did not open for full-time service until June 19, 1993, at which time 30th Street ceased to be a terminal except for occasional short turns. Accessible platforms were built several years later at 29th Street and Day Street slightly to the north, as the tight turn at 30th Street would have limited the space available.

In March 2014, Muni released details of the proposed implementation of their Transit Effectiveness Project (later rebranded MuniForward), which included a variety of stop changes for the J Church line. Under that plan, the stop at Church and 30th Street would be closed to reduce travel time on the line. A more limited preliminary project announced in November 2019 also included the stop closure. However, plans released in 2020 called for the inbound stop at 29th Street to be closed instead; the 30th Street stop would be moved around the corner onto 30th Street.
