= 30th Regiment =

In military terms, 30th regiment may refer to:

== Infantry regiments ==
- 30th (Cambridgeshire) Regiment of Foot, British Army
- 30th Light Dragoons, British Army
- 30th Infantry Regiment (United States)

=== Regiments in the American Civil War ===
==== Confederate States Army ====
- 30th Arkansas Infantry Regiment
- 30th Georgia Infantry Regiment

==== Union Army ====
- 30th Connecticut Infantry Regiment (Colored)
- 30th Indiana Infantry Regiment
- 30th Illinois Infantry Regiment
- 30th Iowa Infantry Regiment
- 30th Kentucky Mounted Infantry Regiment
- 30th Massachusetts Infantry Regiment
- 30th Maine Infantry Regiment
- 30th Michigan Infantry Regiment
- 30th New York Infantry Regiment
- 30th Wisconsin Infantry Regiment

== Artillery regiments ==
- 30th Field Artillery Regiment (Canada)
- 30th Field Artillery Regiment (United States)

== See also ==
- 30th Army (disambiguation)
- XXX Corps (disambiguation)
- 30th Battalion (disambiguation)
- 30th Division (disambiguation)
- 30 Squadron (disambiguation)
