= 30th Reconnaissance Squadron (disambiguation) =

The 30th Reconnaissance Squadron is an active United States Air Force Unit, originally constituted as the '30th Photographic Reconnaissance Squadron' in February 1943. It has held this designation since September 2005.

30th Reconnaissance Squadron may also refer to:

- 920th Air Refueling Squadron, constituted as the '30th Reconnaissance Squadron (Heavy)' but redesignated '420th Bombardment Squadron (Heavy)' before being activated in June 1942
- 30th Tactical Reconnaissance Squadron active as the '30th Reconnaissance Squadron (Fighter)' from April 1943 to August 1943

== See also ==
- 30th Photographic Reconnaissance Squadron
- 30th Strategic Reconnaissance Squadron
- 30th Tactical Reconnaissance Squadron, active from August 1943 to May 1944
- 30th Tactical Reconnaissance Squadron, active from November 1952 to April 1976
- 30th Weather Reconnaissance Squadron
