= 30th Army Division (3rd Formation) (People's Republic of China) =

Independent Division of Shanxi Provincial Military District (1966-69) Independent Division of Inner Mongolian Military District (1969–83) 30th Army Division (1983-85)
- Active: 1966.7 - 1985.9
- Country: People's Republic of China
- Branch: People's Liberation Army
- Type: Division
- Role: Infantry

Independent Division of Shanxi Provincial Military District (Chinese: 山西省军区独立师)(1st Formation) was formed in July 1966 from the Public Security Contingent of Shanxi province. The division was composed of six regiments (1st to 6th).

In March 1969 6th Infantry Regiment was detached. The division with 5 of its regiments moved to Inner Mongolia and renamed as Independent Division of Inner Mongolian Military District(Chinese: 内蒙古军区独立师).

The division HQ stationed in Huhhot.

The division was then a "behind the enemy line" formation, composing of 5 lightly armed infantry regiments, without any artillery pieces.

In 1971 5th Regiment was disbanded. All regiments received support weapons, i.e. mortars and recoilless rifles.

From April 1976 the division was converted to a "field army" formation. Its 4th Regiment became Artillery Regiment, composing of 1 160-mm mortar battalion, 1 122-mm howitzer battalion, 1 107-mm rocket artillery battalion and 1 85-mm AT gun battalion.

In May 1983 the division was renamed as 30th Army Division(Chinese: 陆军第30师). All its regiments were re-designated as follows:

- 88th Infantry Regiment;
- 89th Infantry Regiment;
- 90th Infantry Regiment;
- Artillery Regiment.

In September 1985 the division was disbanded. 2 of its regiments were transferred to People's Armed Police, and the other 2 were transferred to 6th Garrison Division of Beijing Military Region.
