= 30th Cavalry Squadron, King's Guard =

Special operations force of the Royal Thai Army

30th Cavalry Squadron 2nd Infantry Division, King's Guard
- กองพันทหารม้าที่ 30 กองพลทหารราบที่ 2 รักษาพระองค์
- Unit insignia
- Active: November 10th 1989–present
- Country: Thailand
- Branch: Royal Thai Army
- Type: Armoured cavalry
- Size: Squadron
- Part of: 2nd Infantry Division
- Garrison/HQ: Ban Phra, Mueang Prachinburi, Prachinburi, Thailand
- Nickname: 30th Cavalry Squadron(ม.พัน 30)
- Engagements: Cold War; Communist insurgency in Thailand; Vietnamese border raids in Thailand; Thai–Laotian Border War; Southern Insurgency; Cambodian–Thai border dispute; 2008–2011 Cambodia–Thailand border crisis; 2025 Cambodia–Thailand conflict
- Website: http://cavalry30.com/web/(in Thai)

Commanders
- Ceremonial chief: Khattiya Sawasdipol

The 30th Cavalry Squadron, 2nd Infantry Division, King's Guard (Thai: กองพันทหารม้าที่ 30 กองพลทหารราบที่ 2 รักษาพระองค์) (ม.พัน.๓๐.พล.ร.๒ รอ.) is a King's Guard Armoured Cavalry Squadron of the Royal Thai Army (RTA), it is currently a part of the 2nd Infantry Division, King's Guard.

== History ==
In 1978 the 30th Cavalry Squadron is 5th Armoured Reconnaissance Company. In 1983 the unit transitioned from the 5th Armoured Reconnaissance Company to the Cavalry Reconnaissance Squadron. In 1989 Royal Thai Army established the 30th Cavalry Squadron, Queen's Guard.

== Mission ==
Patrol and support infantry unit.

== Weapons ==
- FV101 Scorpion - Reconnaissance vehicle
- M113 - Armoured personnel carrier
- M106 mortar carrier - Mortar carrier
- Humvee - Military light utility vehicle

== See also ==
- 1st Division (Thailand)
- 2nd Infantry Division (Thailand)
- 7th Infantry Division (Thailand)
- 9th Infantry Division (Thailand)
- 4th Tank Battalion, King's Guard (Thailand)
- King's Guard (Thailand)
- Royal Thai Army
- Thai Royal Guards parade
