= 30 Squadron =

30 Squadron or 30th Squadron may refer to:

- No. 30 Squadron RAAF, a unit of the Royal Australian Air Force
- No. 30 Squadron (Finland), a unit of the Finnish Air Force
- No. 30 Squadron RNZAF, a unit of the New Zealand Royal Air Force
- No. 30 Squadron RAF, a unit of the United Kingdom Royal Air Force
- 30th Cavalry Squadron, King's Guard, a unit of the Royal Thai Army
- 30th Aircraft Carrier Squadron, a unit of the United Kingdom Royal Navy
- 30th Air Defense Missile Squadron, a unit of the United States Air Force
- 30th Airlift Squadron, a unit of the United States Air Force
- 30th Bombardment Squadron, a unit of the United States Air Force
- 30th Fighter-Bomber Squadron, a unit of the United States Air Force
- 30th Intelligence Squadron, a unit of the United States Air Force
- 30th Reconnaissance Squadron (disambiguation), units of the United States Air Force
- 30th Space Communications Squadron, a unit of the United States Space Force
- 30th Troop Carrier Squadron, a unit of the United States Army Air Forces / United States Air Force
- 30th Weather Squadron, a unit of the United States Air Force
- VP-30 (Patrol Squadron 30), a unit of the United States Navy
- VRC-30 (Fleet Logistics Support Squadron 30), a unit of the United States Navy
- VRM-30 (Fleet Logistics Multi-Mission Squadron 30), a unit of the United States Navy
- VX-30 (Air Test and Evaluation Squadron 30), a unit of the United States Navy
