= 30th Battalion =

30th Battalion may refer to:

- 30th Battalion (Australia), a unit of the Australian Army raised for service during World War I
- 2/30th Battalion (Australia), a unit of the Australian Army raised for service during World War II
- 30th Battalion, CEF, a unit of the Canadian Expeditionary Force raised for service during World War I
- 30th Battalion, Bengal Native Infantry, an infantry unit of the British Indian Army
- 30th Battalion (New Zealand), a World War II infantry battalion

== See also ==
- 30th Division (disambiguation)
- 30 Squadron (disambiguation)
