= Balboa Park station =

Transit station in San Francisco, California, US

Balboa Park
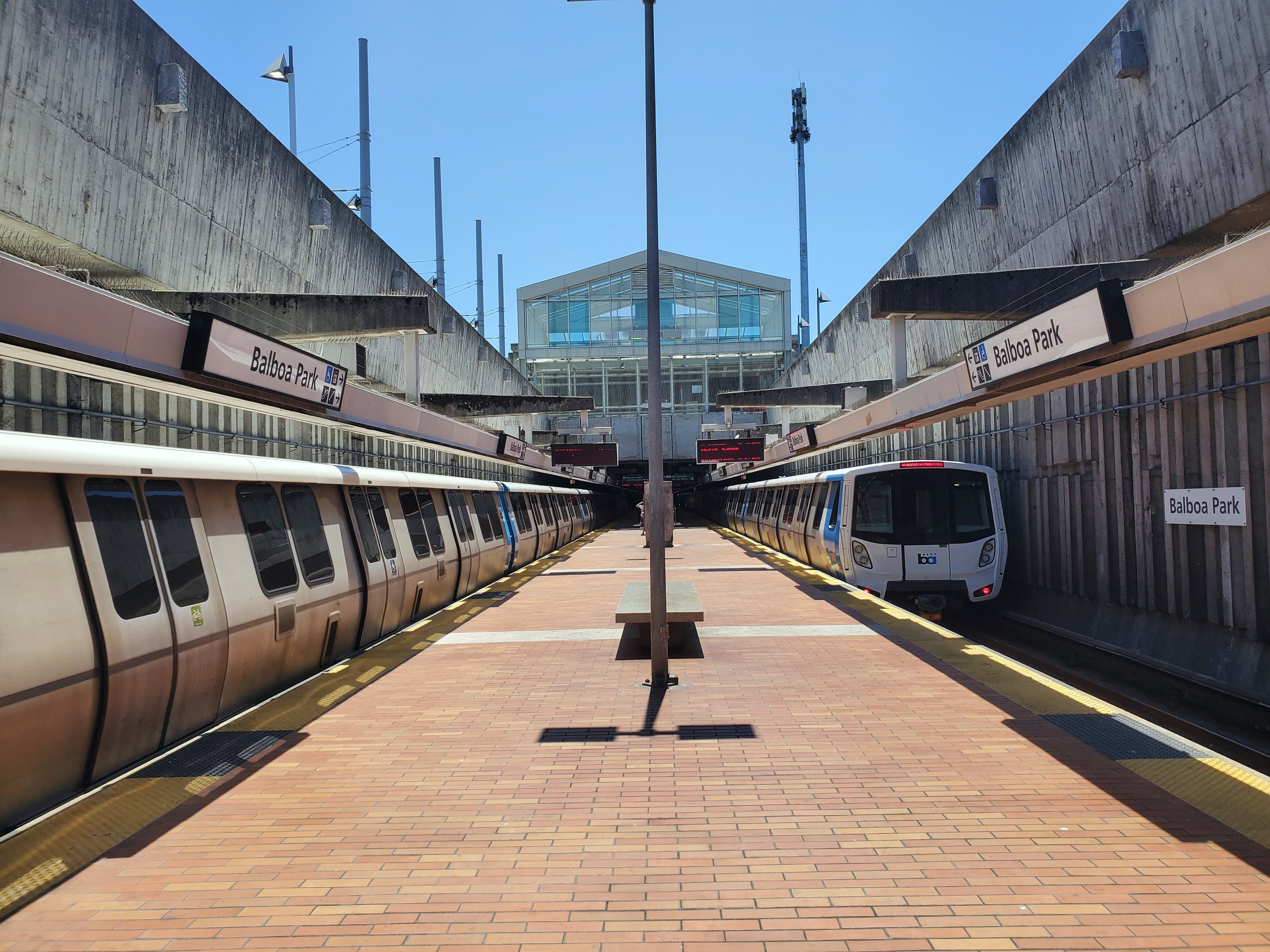
- BART trains at Balboa Park station in July 2023

General information
- Location: 401 Geneva Avenue; San Francisco, California
- Coordinates: 37°43′18″N 122°26′51″W
- Owner: Bay Area Rapid Transit District
- Line: BART M-Line
- Platforms: 1 island platform (BART); 2 side platforms (J & K); 1 side platform (M)
- Tracks: 2 (BART), 1 loop (J & K), 1 loop (M)
- Connections: Muni: 8, 8BX, 29, 43, 49, 54, 88, 91 Owl, 714, J Bus, K Bus, K Owl, M Bus; Commute.org Brisbane-Crocker Park BART Shuttle; Daly City Bayshore Shuttle

Construction
- Structure type: Street level (Muni Metro); Open-cut (BART)
- Cycle facilities: Racks, 12 lockers
- Accessible: Yes
- Architect: Ernest Born; Corlett & Spackman

Other information
- Station code: BART: BALB

History
- Opened: November 5, 1973 (BART); April 23, 1979 (Muni)

Passengers
- 2026: 4,948 (weekday average) (BART)
- 2008: 2,760 daily boardings (Muni Metro)
Services
Preceding station	Bay Area Rapid Transit	Following station
Daly City Terminus	Blue Line	Glen Park toward Dublin/Pleasanton
Daly City Terminus	Green Line	Glen Park toward Berryessa
Daly City toward Millbrae	Red Line	Glen Park toward Richmond
Daly City toward SFO or Millbrae	Yellow Line	Glen Park toward Antioch via Pittsburg/Bay Point
Preceding station	Muni	Following station
Terminus	J Church	San Jose and Ocean toward Embarcadero
City College toward Embarcadero	K Ingleside	Terminus
San Jose and Lakeview toward Embarcadero	M Ocean View (at San Jose and Geneva)	Terminus
Location

Balboa Park station is a Bay Area Rapid Transit (BART) station and Muni Metro complex in the Mission Terrace neighborhood of San Francisco, California, located near the eponymous Balboa Park. It is an intermodal hub served by four BART routes, three Muni Metro lines, and a number of Muni bus routes. The station complex also includes two rail yards, Cameron Beach Yard and Green Light Rail Center, where Muni maintains Muni Metro trains and heritage streetcars. BART uses a below-grade island platform on the west side of the complex; Muni Metro routes use several smaller side platforms located on surface-level rail loops around the yards.

The San Francisco and San Jose Railroad opened in 1863, with Elkton station located near the modern site. Passenger service on the line (later the Southern Pacific Railroad Ocean View Branch) ran until about 1922. Electric streetcar service at Balboa Park began in 1892 with the San Francisco and San Mateo Electric Railway, which built a still-standing office building designed by Reid & Reid there in 1901. The United Railroads conglomerate built its Elkton shops on an adjacent parcel in 1907. In the 1960s, BART decided to use the Ocean View Branch right-of-way for part of a rapid transit system. The San Francisco portion of BART, including Balboa Park station, opened on November 5, 1973.

Both streetcar facilities were replaced by modern yards in the 1970s and 1980s. Muni Metro service to the Balboa Park complex began with the K Ingleside line in 1979, followed by the M Ocean View line in 1980 and the J Church line in 1991. In the early 2000s, BART and Muni began planning renovations to improve the accessibility of the station and its connections to the surrounding neighborhoods. A new BART entrance was completed in 2011, followed by new Muni platforms in 2015 and 2017 and an additional footbridge in 2018. Additional improvements like more elevators and modernized headhouses are proposed. The 1901-built office building and an adjacent powerhouse, were abandoned after the 1989 Loma Prieta earthquake. They were added to the National Register of Historic Places in 2010; a renovation of the powerhouse for community use was completed in 2020, while a renovation of the office building is planned but unfunded.

== Station layout and services ==
Map of the Balboa Park station complex prior to development of the Upper Yard parcel

The Balboa Park station complex is centered around an irregular quadrilateral bounded by Ocean Avenue to the north, the Interstate 280 (I-280) cut to the west, Geneva Avenue to the south, and San Jose Avenue to the east. The BART platform—a 700-foot-long (210 m) island platform—is located below grade on the west side of the complex. It stretches from Ocean Avenue to slightly south of Geneva Avenue. The northern third of the platform, plus a small section at the southern end, is in an open trench; the remainder is under Geneva Avenue and the headhouse structure. The main entrance, located on the north side of Geneva Avenue, leads to a below-street-level fare control area in a mezzanine over the middle of the BART platform. Additional entrances from the south side of Geneva Avenue (via an underpass) and from San Jose Avenue at Geneva Avenue (the Muni entrance) also lead to the fare control area. From the two paid areas in the mezzanine, stairs and escalators connect to the platform. An accessible ramp from Ocean Avenue runs along the west side of the station to a secondary fare control area at the north end of the north paid area. An elevator on the north side of Geneva Avenue connects to the south paid area and the platform.

A Muni Metro rail yard, the Curtis E. Green Light Rail Center, takes up the rest of the block. The east half is occupied by a maintenance building and the west half by open storage tracks, with an administrative building at the south end. Muni J Church and K Ingleside trains loop around the outer edge of the yard. Trains enter from Ocean Avenue and drop off passengers at a high-level platform (which is connected to the BART fare mezzanine and the path top San Jose Avenue with a ramp) on the west side of the yard. They lay over on a pair of tracks on the south side of the yard, then pick up passengers at a high-level platform on the east side of the yard adjacent to San Jose Avenue. J Church trains exit the yard there onto tracks on San Jose Avenue (with a separate stop at Ocean Avenue), while K Ingleside trains continue around the loop and exit where they entered.

A second Muni rail yard, the Cameron Beach Yard, is located south of Geneva Avenue and east of San Jose Avenue. It includes a maintenance building, a storage shelter for historic streetcars, open storage tracks, and a currently-abandoned office building and powerhouse. M Ocean View trains loop around Cameron Beach Yard; the last stop for outbound trains is at San Jose and Niagara, one block to the south of Geneva Avenue. The stop does not have a platform; if a passenger needs an accessible platform to alight, the train will proceed across Geneva Avenue to a mini-high platform located at Seneca Avenue. Inbound trains pick up passengers at San Jose and Geneva, which has a concrete platform with a wayside lift for accessibility, after proceeding around the yard loop. A housing development is located on the west side of San Jose Avenue on a parcel that formerly housed storage tracks called the Upper Yard.

Balboa Park is a major transfer point for Muni buses, with over 13,000 daily boardings by a 2008 survey. Routes 8, 8BX, 43, 54, 88, 91 Owl, and 714 stop on Geneva Avenue next to the BART station entrances. Routes 29 and 49 stop on Ocean Avenue at I-280 and at San Jose Avenue. Routes 714 and K Bus stop on San Jose Avenue. The Commute.org Brisbane-Crocker Park Shuttle and the SamTrans Daly City Bayshore Shuttle also stop on Geneva Avenue.

== History ==
=== Southern Pacific Railroad ===
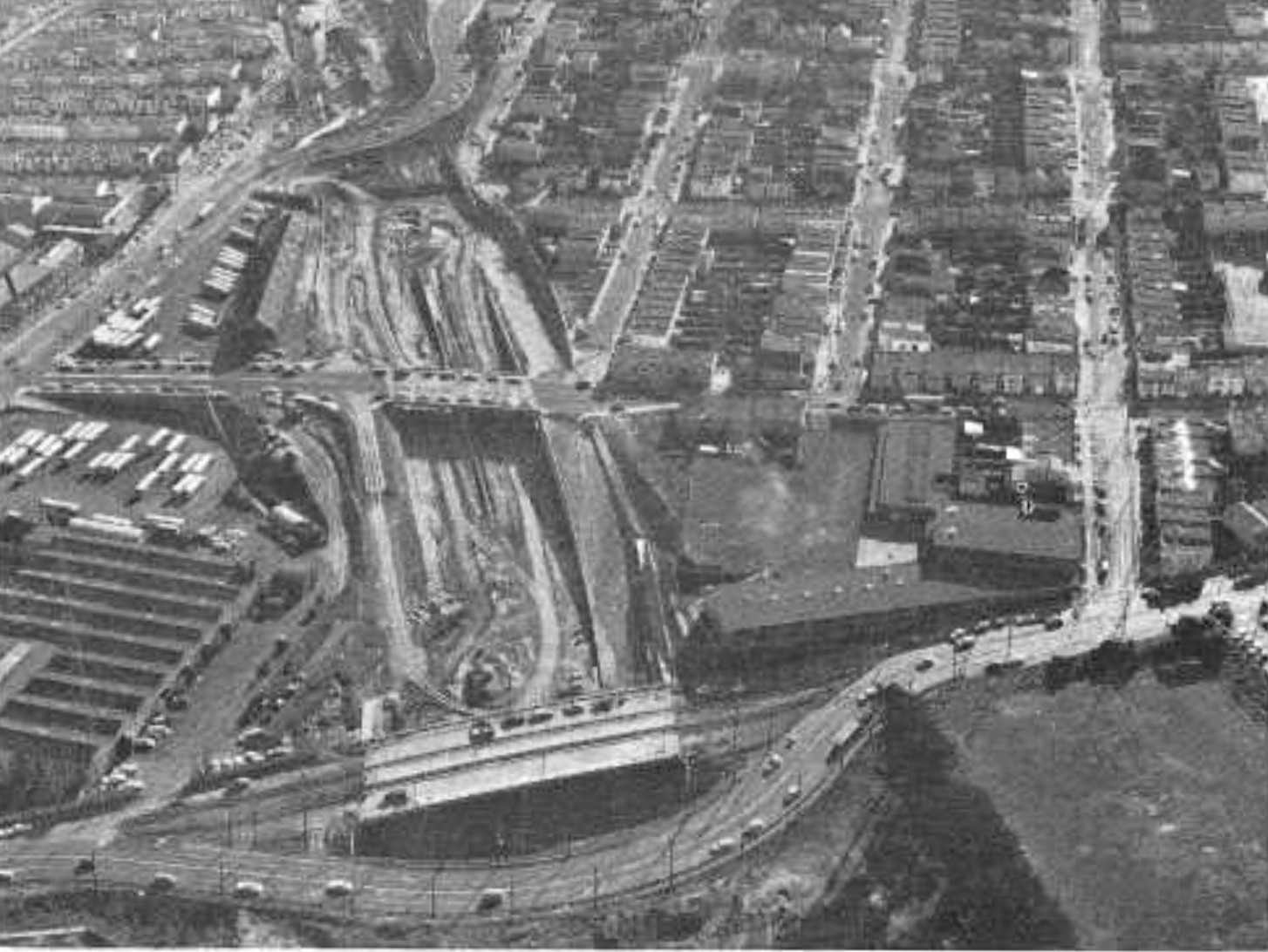
Freeway construction on the former Southern Pacific right-of-way in 1964. The Elkton shops are at left, with Ocean Avenue in the foreground.

The San Francisco and San Jose Railroad (SF&SJ) opened through San Francisco on October 16, 1863, and was merged into the Southern Pacific Railroad (SP) in 1868. The line had several stops within San Francisco, including Elkton, located on the east side of the tracks 300 feet (90 m) south of Ocean Avenue. It was primarily a freight station for nearby farms, though it also served the nearby Industrial School as well as residential neighborhoods that were laid out in the 1860s. However, the railroad was not very useful to local residents: high fares discouraged both passengers and freight, and on-street running in the Mission District made the ride slow. After the SP opened the faster Bayshore Cutoff in 1907, the original mainline through San Francisco was reduced to a minor freight branch (the Ocean View Branch) with minimal passenger service.

SP passenger service on the Ocean View Branch was limited to a few daily locals after 1907, and just one daily round trip after June 1919. The SP was allowed to temporarily discontinue passenger service on the branch in November 1928 during a construction project. This became permanent in March 1930; freight service on the line continued. The tracks were abandoned north of Ocean Avenue (up to 23rd Street) on August 10, 1942, and south of Ocean Avenue (to Daly City) after a 1956 excursion train. The Southern Freeway was constructed partially on the abandoned right-of-way in the 1960s; the section through Balboa Park was completed in 1964. As part of the highway, pedestrian ramps were built at Ocean Avenue to allow passengers on highway express buses to transfer to local transit.

=== Streetcars ===
Electric streetcar service began with the San Francisco and San Mateo Electric Railway (SF&SM) on San Jose Avenue on April 27, 1892. It was followed in December 1895 by a Market Street Railway spur on Ocean Avenue, branching off their Mission Street line. In 1900, the SF&SM bought land on the southeast corner of San Jose Avenue and Geneva Avenue to construct its main facilities. Construction began on July 14, 1900. An office building along San Jose Avenue—designed by Reid & Reid—opened on April 22, 1901, followed by an adjacent powerhouse in 1903. The SF&SM and the Market Street Railway were both absorbed into the United Railroads (URR) conglomerate in 1902. After the 1906 San Francisco earthquake, the URR rerouted the San Mateo line to Mission Street; Embarcadero–Daly City route 26 continued to operate on San Jose Avenue.

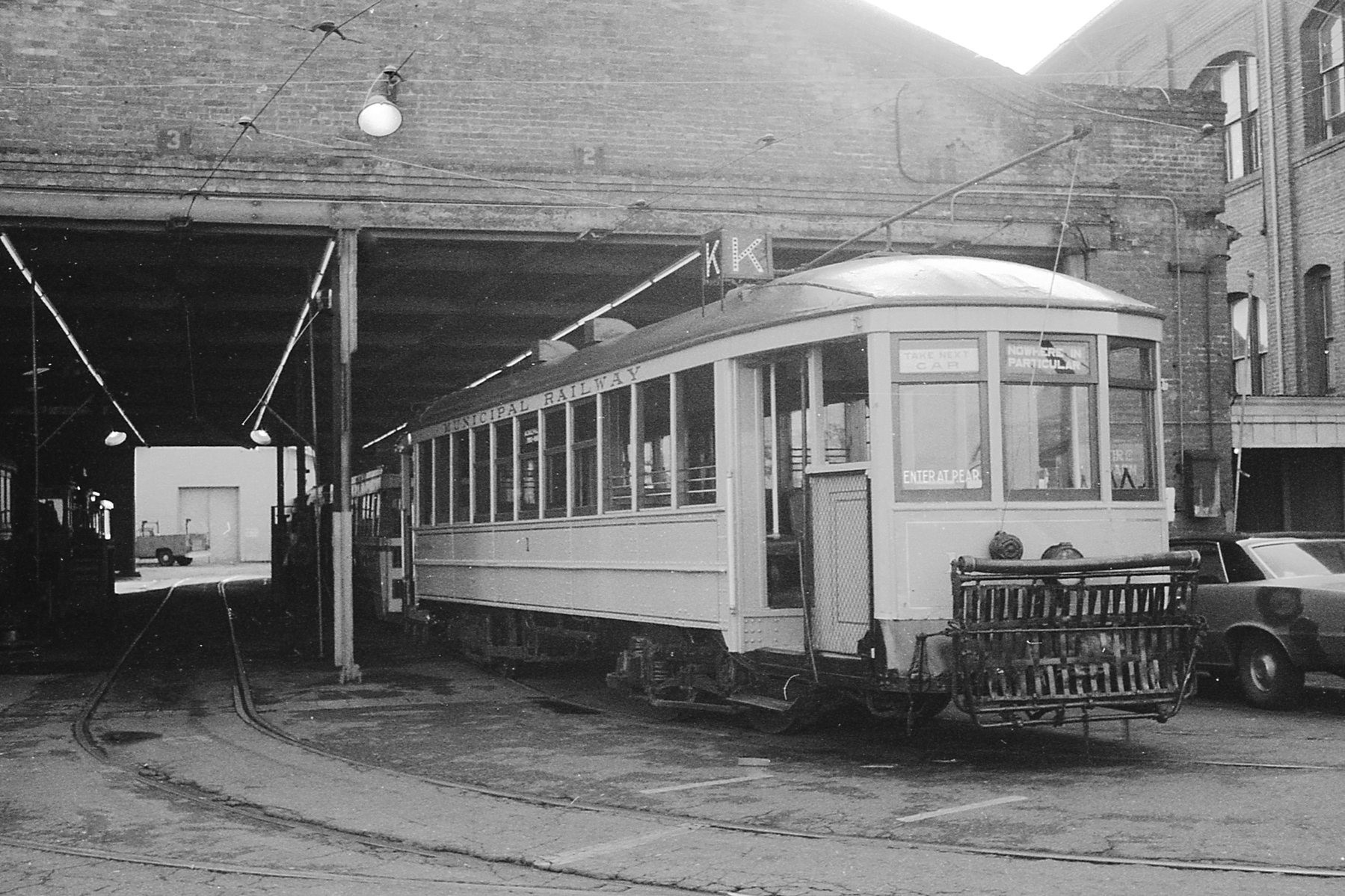
Elkton Shops in 1974

In 1907, while expanding its streetcar network after the earthquake, the URR hurriedly opened its Elkton shops next to the SP's Elkton station. The shops occupied a parcel bounded by San Jose Avenue to the east, the SP line to the west, Ocean Avenue to the north, and Geneva Avenue to the south. The SP line was used to deliver materials to the yard. On September 16, 1909, the SF&SM yard was renamed Geneva Yard. The powerhouse, damaged in the earthquake, was rebuilt in 1910. In 1917, during a violent strike of URR operators, strike-brakers were temporarily housed in the office building. A wooden staircase was constructed from the second floor directly to the carbarn.

The URR was renamed as the Market Street Railway in 1921, and purchased by the city-owned San Francisco Municipal Railway (Muni) in 1944. The merger and the impending end of World War II (which had limited the availability of rubber tires) prompted the conversion of many streetcar routes to bus or trolleybus. Route 26 had previously been discontinued in 1938 and soon replaced by a branch (itself closed on November 5, 1939) of the route 9 streetcar. Route 26 service resumed on September 23, 1944, but was replaced by buses on February 4, 1945, ending streetcar service on San Jose Avenue. Muni's K Ingleside line was extended on Ocean Avenue and Onondaga Street to Mission Street on April 8, 1945, as the ex-MSR line on Ocean Avenue was converted to bus. K Ingleside service was cut back to Phelan Loop on October 10, 1952; however, Geneva Yard was retained as the yard for the remaining streetcar system. The southern portion of the Elkton lot, as well as the parcel across Geneva Avenue to the south, were used for bus storage.

=== BART station ===
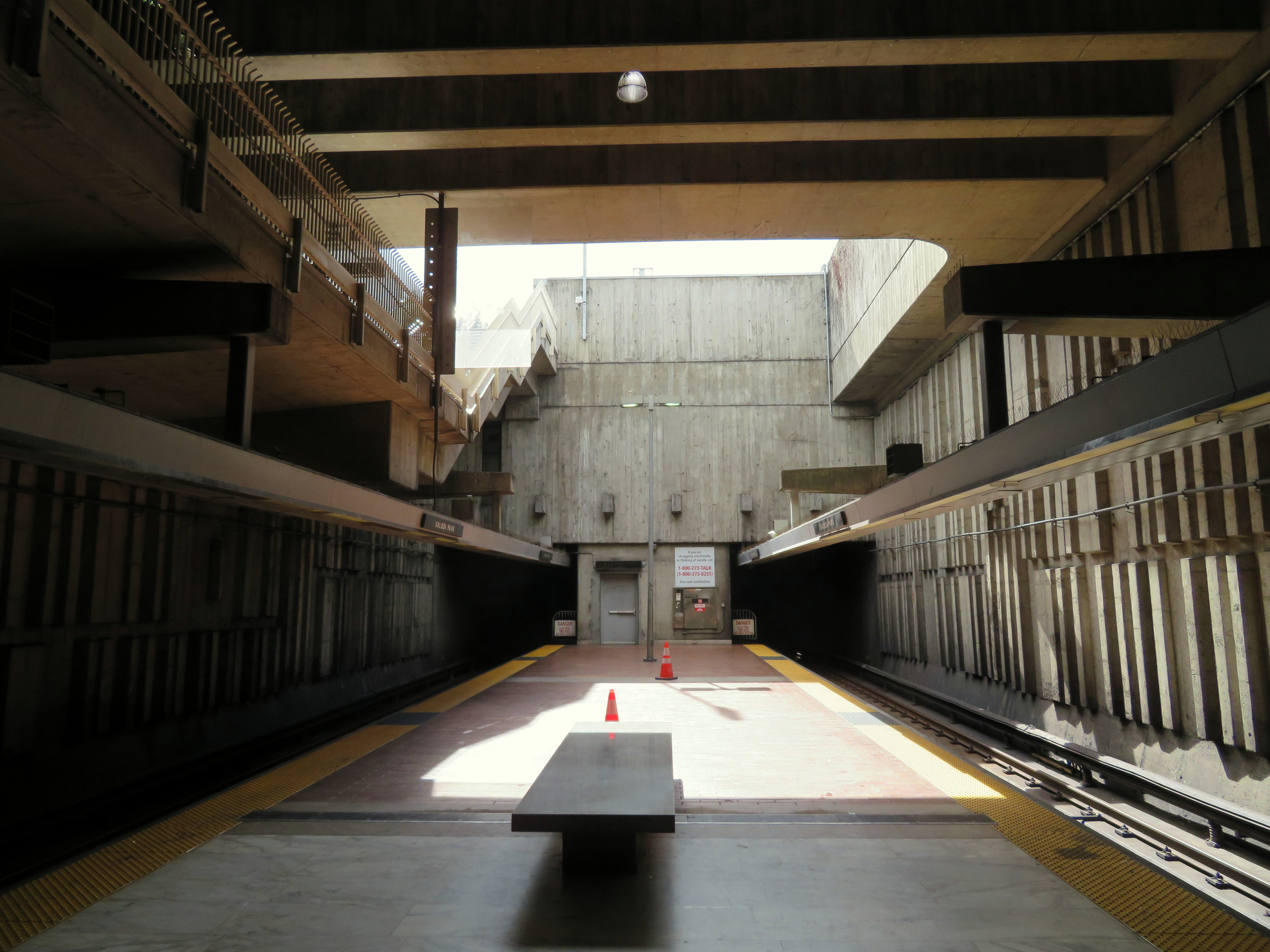
South end of the station platform showing the natural lighting, textured walls, and overhead conduit design praised by critics

Even before the Ocean View Branch was abandoned, several proposals for rapid transit aimed to use the Ocean View Branch route (usually in conjunction with a Mission Street subway) and its Bernal Cut to avoid expensive tunneling through San Francisco's hills. Early plans for BART around 1960 considered several different routings for the Peninsula Line (then planned to extend to Palo Alto): the Bayshore Cutoff, the existing Twin Peaks Tunnel, a new bored tunnel crossing diagonally under the Mission District, and a Mission Street tunnel continuing via Alemany Boulevard. By 1961, the Mission Street tunnel and reuse of the Ocean View Branch was favored, with a station at Ocean Avenue. The plan was approved by voters in 1962.

Early BART plans referred to many stations by the cross street, but most stations were ultimately named for the surrounding neighborhood or city. The BART Board approved the name "Balboa Park" (after the nearby municipal park) for the station at Ocean Avenue in December 1965. The station was sandwiched between I-280 and Elkton shops, a sliver of which was taken for construction. Construction of the station was 60% complete by mid-1970, with work expected to be finished the next year. The San Francisco portion of BART, including Balboa Park station, opened on November 5, 1973.

Rather than having a single architecture firm design every station, BART had a number of architects (mostly local) design one or several stations each "so that each station will achieve a character of its own, suitable to its own unique environment". Balboa Park and Glen Park were designed by Ernest Born (who also designed the systemwide station signage) and Corlett & Spackman, with landscape work by Douglas Baylis. Both stations were designed in the brutalist style, with Balboa Park the "smaller and more intimate". It has headhouses on each side of Geneva Avenue, sized to be appropriate to the surrounding residential neighborhoods. Original plans called for a bus parking deck over the platform, but a late decision to omit it (Woods Division in the Dogpatch neighborhood was built instead) allowed for the north and south ends of the platform to be in open air. The walls of the platform area are covered with linear precast concrete forms, with five patterns repeated eightfold to generate "an apparently infinite variety". Other elements praised by architectural critics included overhead power conduits on the platform level, and the interplay of light and shadow among the geometric forms of the mezzanine.

=== Muni service ===
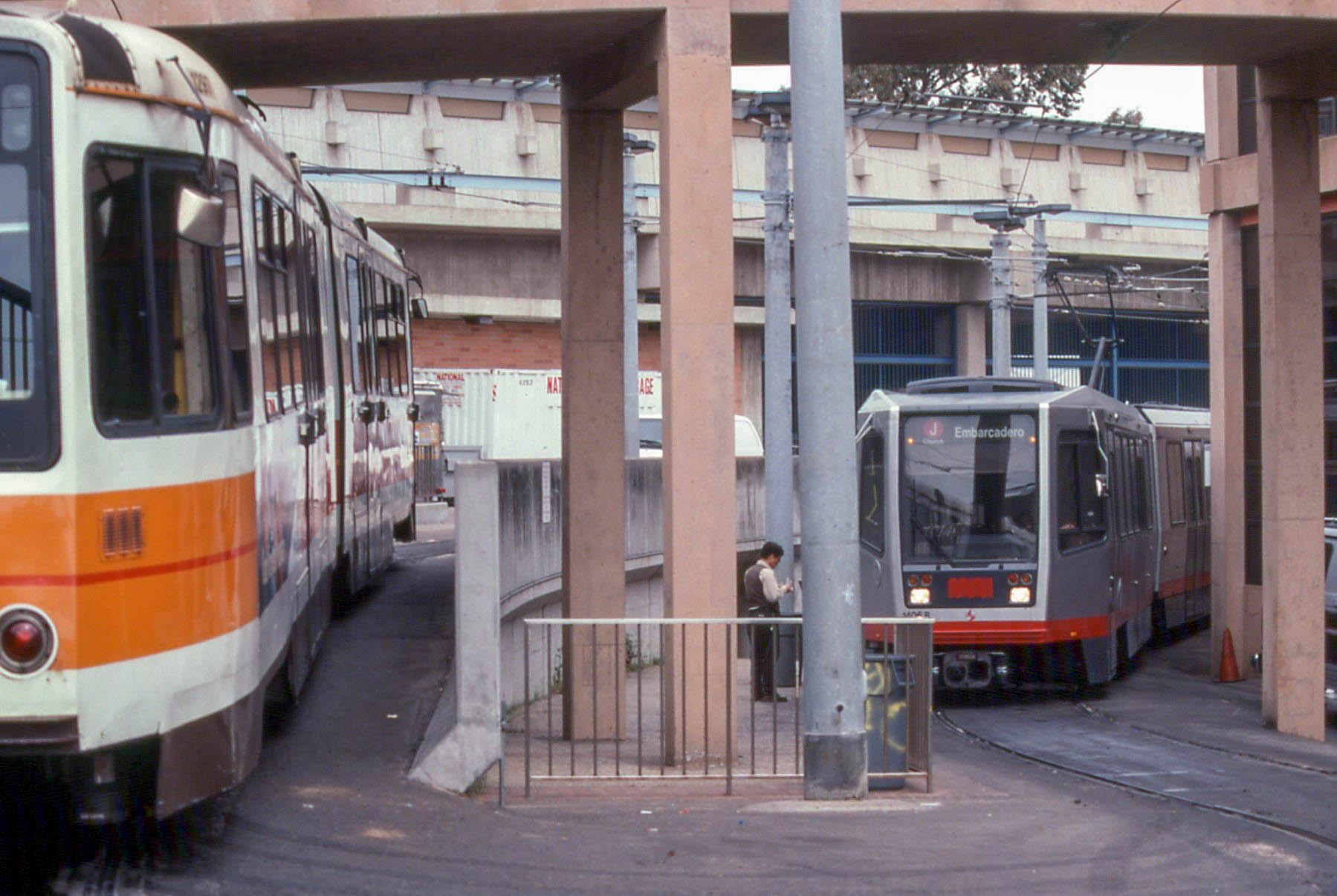
K (left) and J streetcars laying over at Balboa Park in 1997

As Muni began transitioning from aging PCC streetcars to the Boeing USLRV in the 1970s, Elkton shops and the old car barn in Geneva Yard (which had been Muni's only rail yard since 1956) required modernization. Elkton Shops was closed on May 30, 1977, and replaced with a new facility. This Metro Rail Center included a loop track around its periphery, with an alighting area adjacent to the BART fare mezzanine in the southwest corner and a boarding area near San Jose Avenue in the southeast corner, plus a stop in the northeast corner of the yard. Some K Ingleside shuttle service was extended to Balboa Park on April 23, 1979, and all weekday service ran to Balboa Park after the line was converted to Muni Metro light rail operation on December 17, 1980. The Metro Rail Center was named the Curtis E. Green Light Rail Center in 1987. Green had become after Muni's general manager in 1974 – the first African-American to lead a major transit system in the US – and retired in 1982. A second Muni Metro line, the M Ocean View, was extended to the station complex on August 30, 1980; it usually looped around Green Yard, but used the Geneva Yard loop at times. For some time beginning in 1982, the K and M lines were through-routed to avoid the yard loop. The Geneva Yard car barns were demolished in January 1983.

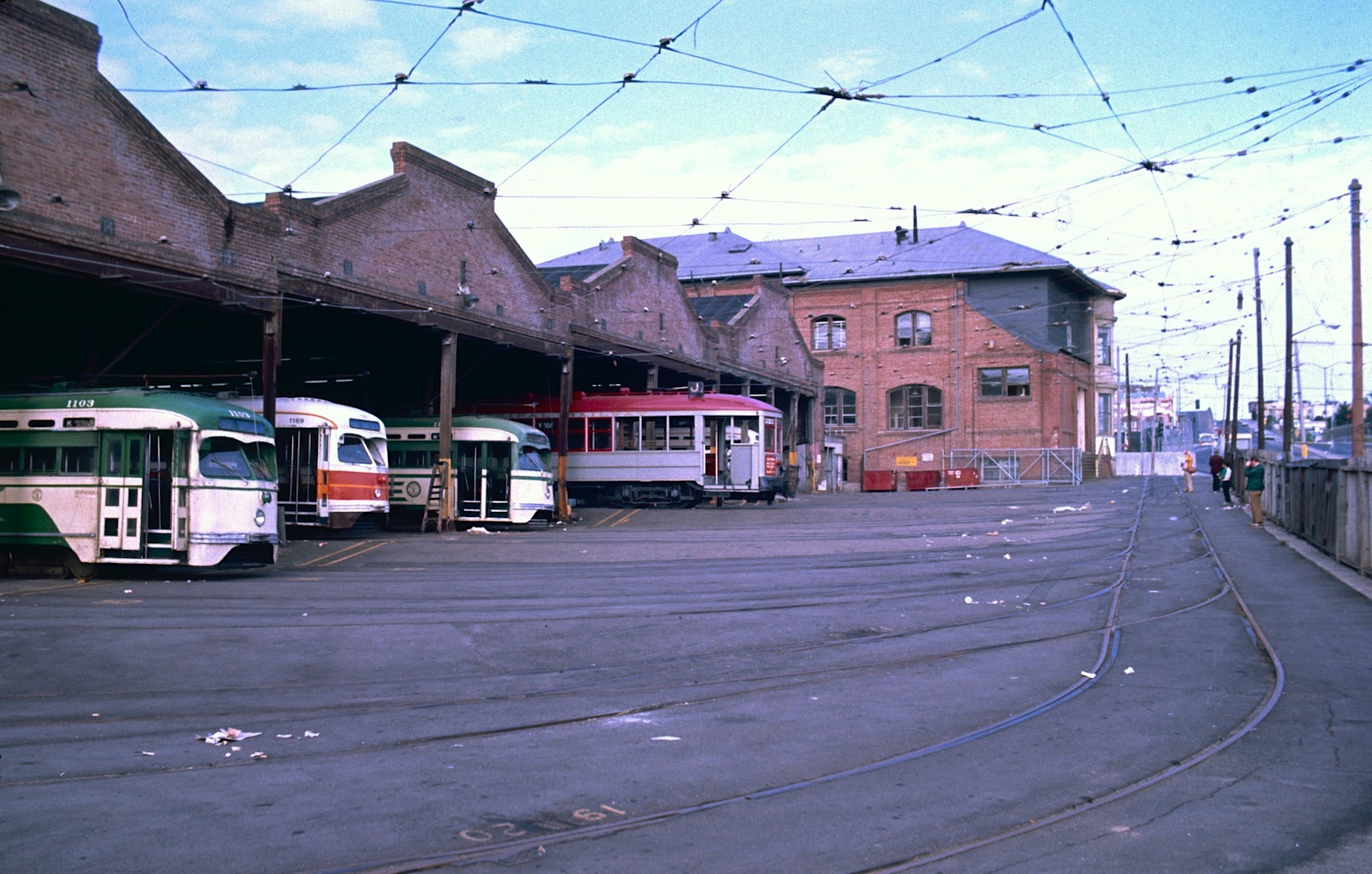
The old Geneva Car Barn on its final day of operation: September 19, 1982

In 1972, Muni began planning a long-proposed extension of the J Church line along San Jose Avenue (a section of which was built along the former Ocean View Branch through the Bernal Cut) to Balboa Park. The extension was intended to provide transit service to the Outer Mission, allow J Church and N Judah trains to access the carhouses via San Jose Avenue rather than a roundabout route via the K Ingleside line, and allow future through-routing of the J and M lines. Construction on the extension began in January 1989, but was delayed by the earthquake later that year. On August 31, 1991, J and N streetcars began using the extension to access the yards, thus providing revenue J service to Balboa at limited hours. Full-time revenue service began June 19, 1993.

The extension included a new stop for the J line at San Jose and Ocean; inbound K trains also stopped at a plaza near that intersection. A small accessible platform was built east of Green Yard, next to the northbound track on San Jose at Seneca, to allow the planned through-routing. (Southbound trains were to use the existing alighting and boarding area on the Green Yard loop; a small accessible platform was available on the west side of the yard loop, north of the main alighting area.) However, although some weekday J and M service was through-routed from 1995 to 1998, full through-routing was never implemented. Instead, J trains shared the revenue loop around Green Yard with K trains, using the same boarding and alighting areas. J trains were diverted onto an inner track between the accessible platform and the boarding area; an underpass under the K track connected the J alighting area to the fare mezzanine. This allowed J and K trains to lay over separately so that irregular operations on one line would not impact the other.

=== Modern renovations ===
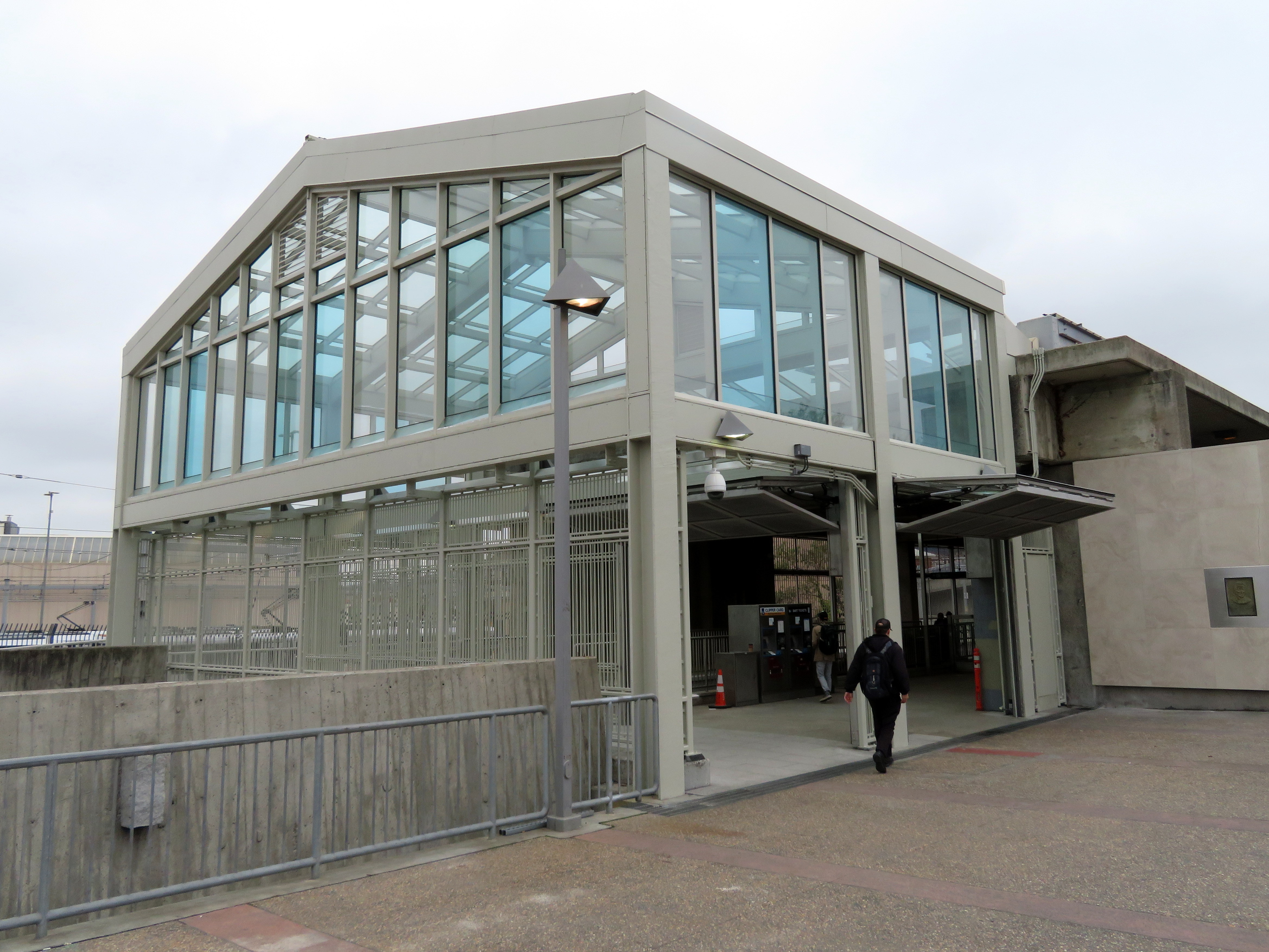
The completed Eastside Connector in December 2018

In 2002, BART released the Comprehensive Station Plan, which indicated a need for improved entrances and access at the station. The San Francisco Board of Supervisors approved the Balboa Park Area Plan in May 2009, setting the stage for a number of transit and pedestrian improvements to the station complex. Three projects – the Westside Walkway, the Eastside Connector, and new Muni boarding and alighting platforms – were prioritized and funded.

As constructed, the BART station only had direct access from Geneva Avenue; a non-accessible pathway on the west side of the station was the only official route from Ocean Avenue, though many passengers took a shorter but dangerous route through the Muni yard instead. The Westside Walkway replaced the northern half of the path with a concrete ramp that leads to a new set of faregates at the north end of the headhouse, thus providing a shorter and fully accessible entrance from Ocean Avenue and the nearby City College of San Francisco (for which the station is the main transit access).) The walkway was opened on April 15, 2011.

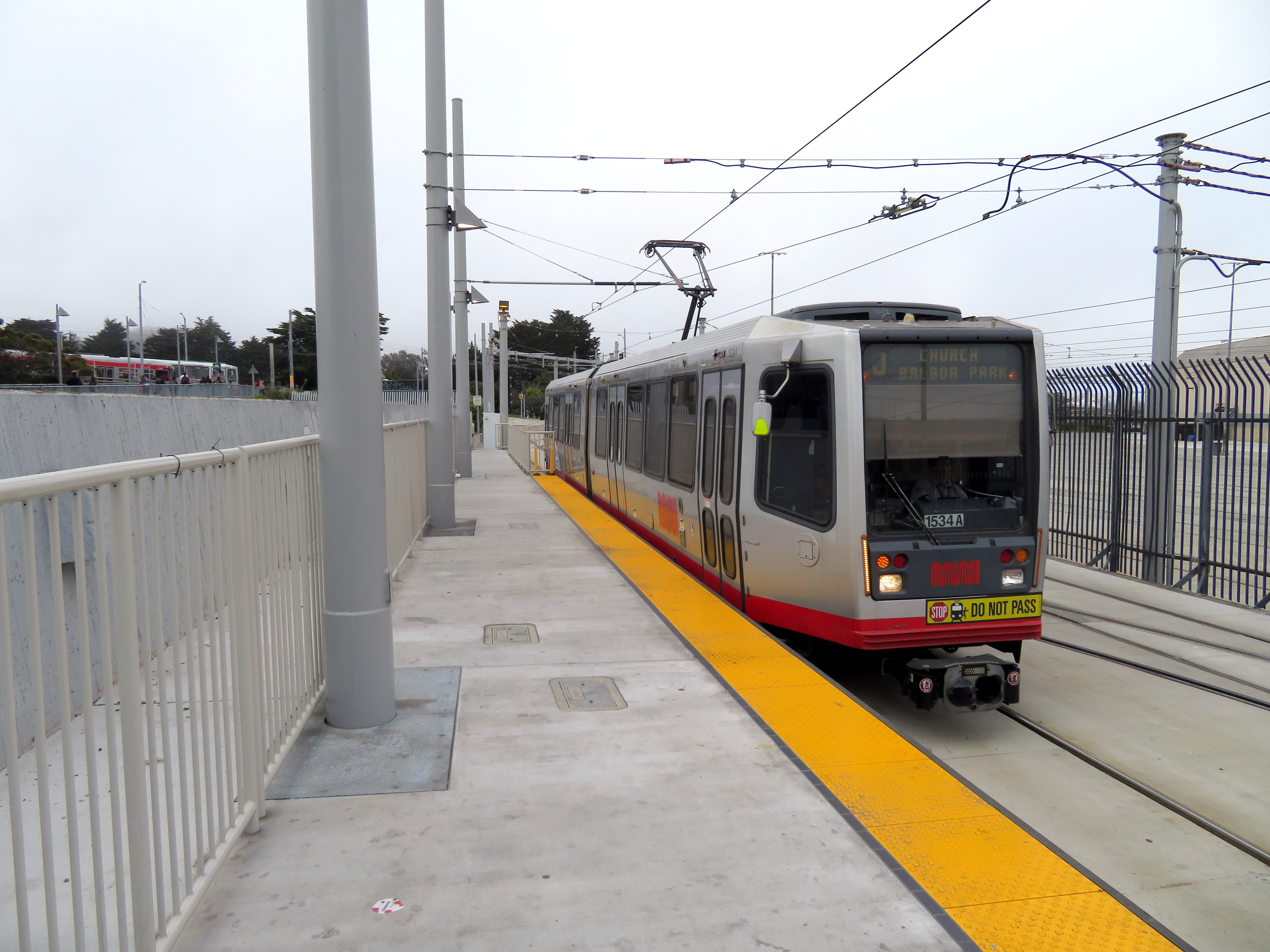
J Church train at the deboarding platform in 2018

In September 2014, Muni began construction of an accessible 1-car-length high-level platform on the east side of the yard, adjacent to San Jose Avenue, to allow level boarding for all inbound J and K riders. This platform replaced a narrow, non-accessible boarding area on the south end of the yard loop. The J and K lines were rerouted onto San Jose Avenue during construction. The new platform was opened on April 27, 2015, with both lines immediately rerouted back to the loop around the yard. The K stop at the northeast corner of the yard was permanently closed on April 25. Red-painted bus lanes were added on westbound Geneva Avenue between Delano Avenue and I-280 in March 2016.

On May 31, 2016, BART began construction of the Eastside Connector project, a northward expansion of the headhouse over the open BART platform with improved connections between Muni and BART. In September 2016, Muni began construction of its section of the project—a longer high-level deboarding platform to replace the mini-high platform on the west side of the yard. This work was coordinated with rail replacement in the yard and widening the pedestrian walkway to San Jose Avenue. The J Church line was rerouted onto San Jose Avenue, while the K Ingleside was cut back to City College Pedestrian Bridge. The K was returned to the loop on May 20, 2017, while the J remained on San Jose Avenue until November 18. The steel deck beams were lifted into place on July 16, 2017. The renovations were completed with the opening of the Eastside Connector on November 30, 2018.

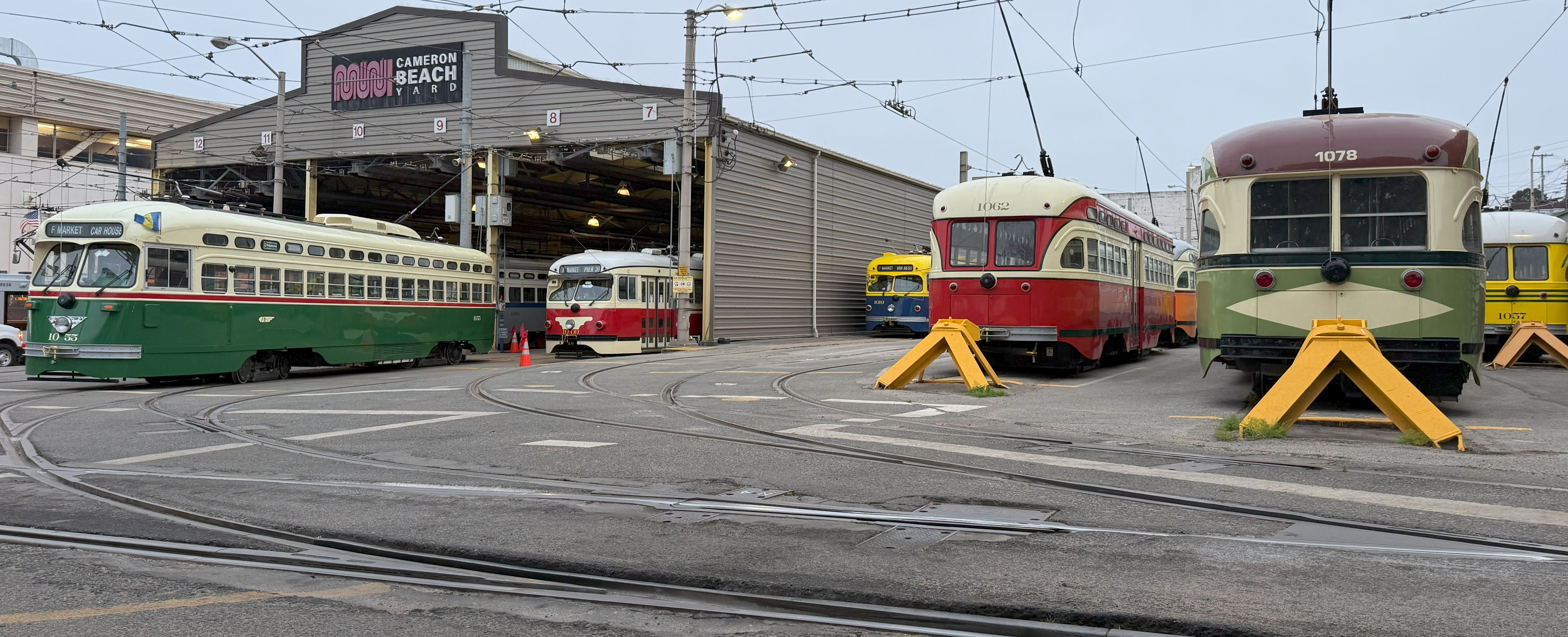
Historic streetcars at Cameron Beach Yard in 2025

The opening of the Muni Metro East facility on the T Third Street line in 2008 reduced storage needs at Geneva Yard. The Upper Yard was closed, and the main yard increasingly dedicated to Muni's historic streetcar fleet. On December 2, 2010, Muni and the Market Street Railway nonprofit organization opened a 6-track shelter at the yard to house 24 historic streetcars. The $10.1 million structure forms the primary storage and maintenance area for the historic fleet. On October 25, 2011, the yard was renamed Cameron Beach Yard after a recently deceased member of the SFMTA Board of Directors. From June 21, 2014, to June 16, 2018, the historic streetcar fleet was stored at Muni Metro East rather than Cameron Beach Yard, as the latter was needed for LRVs displaced by Green Yard rail replacement work. Construction of a 131-unit affordable housing development on the Upper Yard plot began in October 2020 and was completed in September 2023.

The north BART entrances were closed from April 13, 2020, to May 15, 2021, due to low ridership during the COVID-19 pandemic. Thirteen BART stations, including Balboa Park, did not originally have faregates for passengers using the elevator. In 2020, BART started a project to add faregates to elevators at these stations. The new faregate on the BART platform at Balboa Park was installed in August 2021. Construction began in June 2024 on an offboarding platform for the M Ocean View, located south of Niagara Avenue. It opened in December 2024.

=== Proposed renovations ===
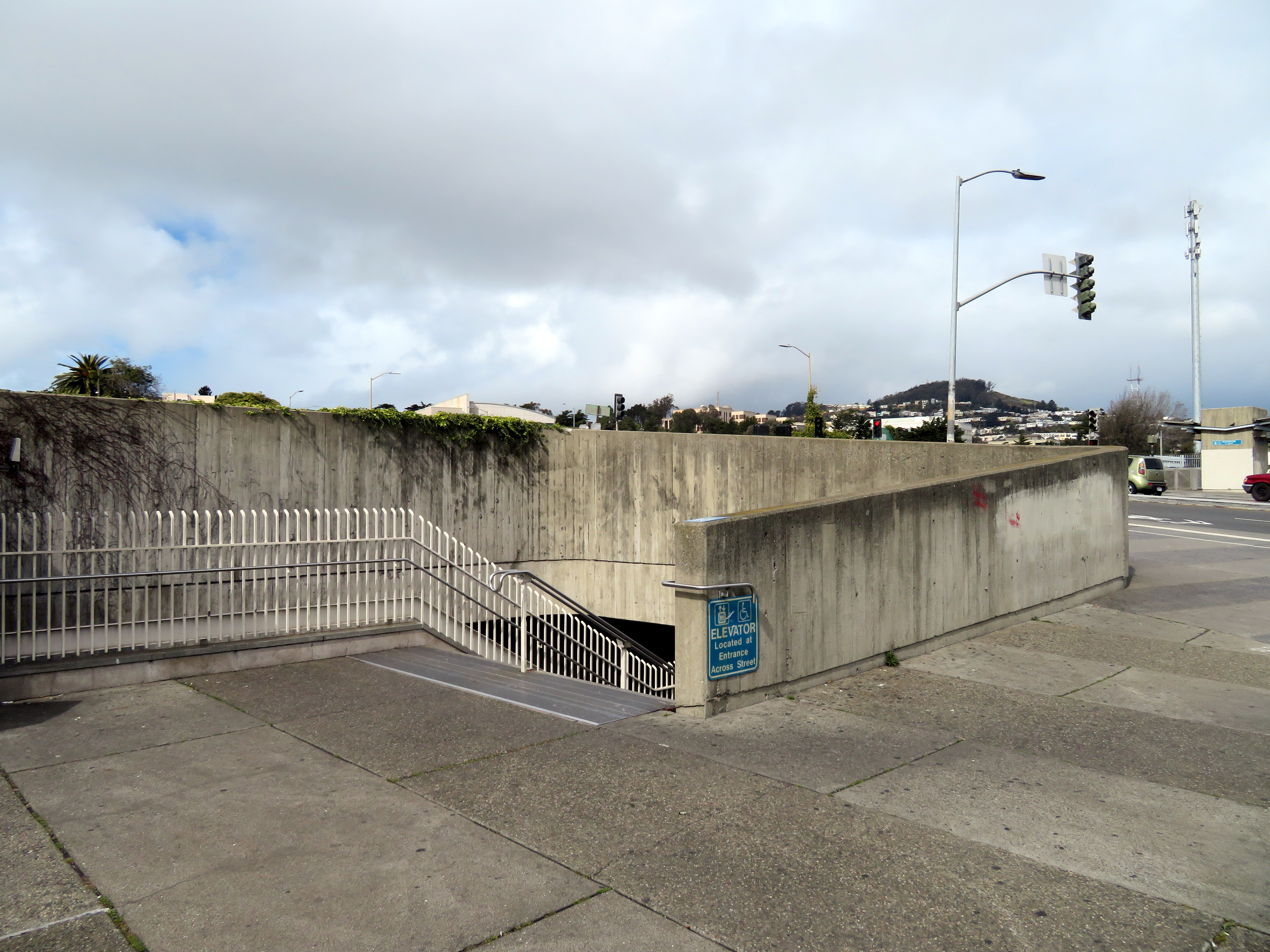
The existing entrance on the south side of Geneva Avenue, which is proposed to be modernized with an elevator and a glass headhouse

In 2012, Muni released the Balboa Park Station Capacity and Conceptual Engineering Study, which analyzed a number of possible improvements to the station area to guide future project choices. Projects recommended by the report (along with those discussed above) included:

- Improvements to wayfinding signage, lighting, real-time information screens, and bus shelters
- An additional elevator on the south side of Geneva Avenue
- Extension of the J line along San Jose Avenue, taking over M service east of 19th Avenue. A new K-only platform would be built at the southern end of the yard, with new retail space above. Previous proposals for a stub-end or loop terminal over I-280 for the J and K lines were deemed infeasible.
- Full-length high-level platforms for the M or extended J in the median of San Jose Avenue at Geneva Avenue. The report recommended farside platforms (served after trains pass the intersection), rather than having both platforms north of Geneva Avenue.
- Creation of a kiss-and-ride cul-de-sac on the existing access road on the west side of the Upper Yard
- New westbound transit-only lane and bus stop island on Ocean Avenue north of the station
- A deck over I-280 (estimated to cost between $1.3 and $2 billion), including a possible single-point urban interchange

The 2011 plan for a rerouting of the M Ocean View through Parkmerced assumed that the M would continue to terminate at Balboa Park. Initial plans in 2014 for a 19th Avenue subway had the M divide into two branches, one terminating at Parkmerced and the other at Balboa Park. A 2016 update to the plan called for the J Church to continue on San Jose Avenue at Balboa Park and take over existing M service as far as San Francisco State University station.

In March 2018, BART released preliminary plans for the next round of modifications to the station. The project would include modern headhouses on both sides of Geneva Avenue, an elevator connecting the south side of Geneva Avenue to the pedestrian underpass and the platform, an elevator connecting the north side of Geneva Avenue to the Muni platform level and fare mezzanine, platform canopies and seating, and new interior finishes and public art.

In 2022, the SFMTA begin planning the M Ocean View Transit and Safety Project, a MuniForward project intended to improve reliability of the segment between Junipero Serra Boulevard and Balboa Park station. Initial proposals released that September did not call for substantial changes at Balboa Park. A series of revised proposals were released in May 2023, August 2023, November 2023, and January 2024, all with changes at Balboa Park. The final proposal was approved by the SFMTA Board in February 2024, with construction expected to begin in 2026. The inbound boarding island to be rebuilt and lengthened near its current location, with an accessible mini-high platform added at the south end; pedestrian access will be via a crosswalk from the west sidewalk. A new outbound mini-high platform will be added north of Niagara.

=== Geneva Yard buildings restoration ===
- Geneva Office Building and Power House
- U.S. National Register of Historic Places
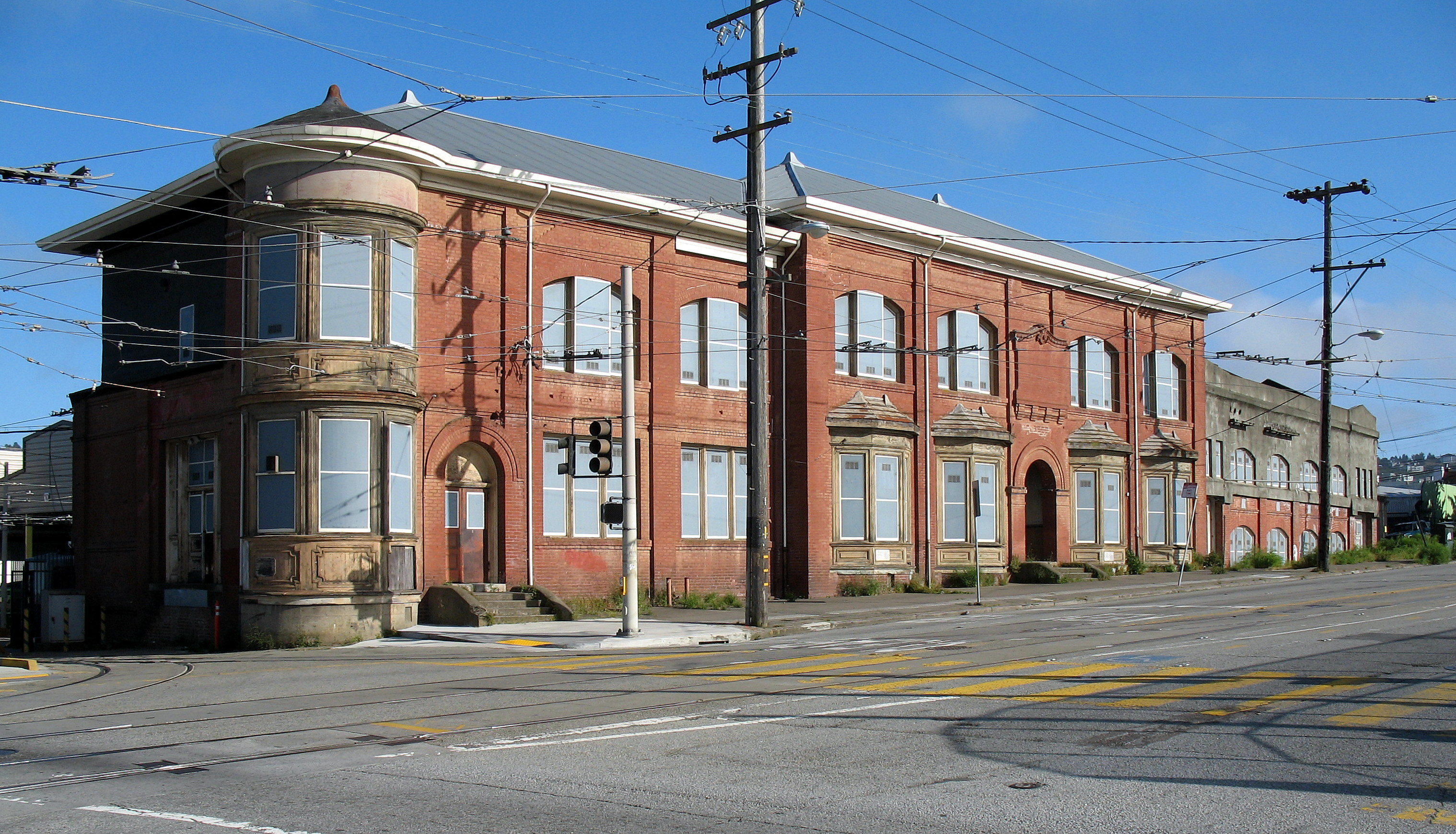
- The office building and powerhouse in 2011
- Location: 2301 San Jose Avenue; San Francisco, California
- Built: 1901
- Architect: Reid & Reid
- Architectural style: Queen Anne, Romanesque
- NRHP reference No.: 10000111
- Added to NRHP: March 31, 2010

The office building at Geneva Yard was designated a San Francisco Landmark by the San Francisco Board of Supervisors in 1985. After being damaged in the 1989 Loma Prieta earthquake, the office building and powerhouse were red-tagged and abandoned. In 1998, Muni planned to demolish the structures to create a parking lot; the agency dropped the plans the next year due to community opposition and the intervention of mayor Willie Brown. The nonprofit group Friends of the Geneva Office Building (later Friends of the Geneva Car Barn and Powerhouse) was formed with the intention of instead renovating the buildings for community use.

Muni completed initial stabilization of the structures in 1999. In March 2004, control of the buildings was transferred to the San Francisco Recreation and Park Department. Over the next 11 years, the department and the Friends spent $3.98 million on repairs, design, and other work related to the buildings. Additional stabilization and seismic refit of the structures was begun in 2004 and completed in 2006. The buildings were added to the National Register of Historic Places on March 31, 2010, as the Geneva Office Building and Power House.

The city gave the Friends of the Geneva Car Barn control of the building in 2014, but reclaimed it in 2015 when the group had difficulties raising funds. In June 2017, the Department budgeted $3 million from a 2012 parks bond, bringing available funding to $11 million. The next month, the city announced that it would receive $3.5 million in state funds for the project — enough to complete renovations of the powerhouse. The city accepted the grant in December. A groundbreaking ceremony for the $14 million powerhouse renovation was held in March 2018. The powerhouse restoration was completed in July 2020. The office building restoration is estimated to cost $38.5 million; as of 2020, funding has not been obtained.
