= Warfield Theatre =

Music venue in San Francisco, California

- Loews Warfield; Fox Warfield
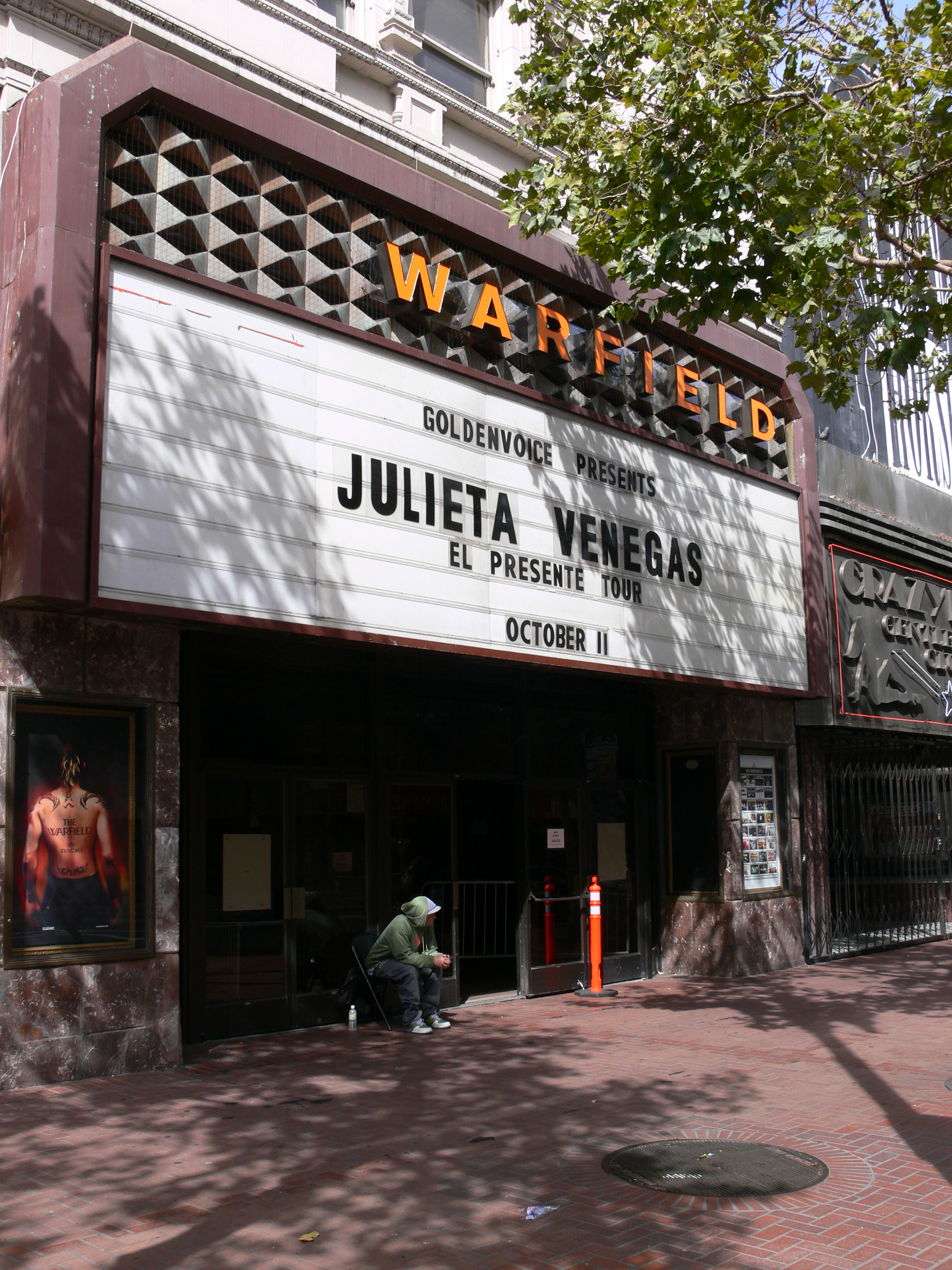
- Warfield Theatre in October 2008
- Interactive map of Warfield Theatre
- Address: 982 Market Street; San Francisco, California; U.S.
- Coordinates: 37.782667°N 122.410268°W
- Owner: A&C Ventures
- Operator: Goldenvoice
- Capacity: 2,454
- Current use: music venue
- Public transit: Powell; Civic Center; Market and 6th Street / Market and Taylor Street

Construction
- Opened: May 13, 1922

Website
- thewarfieldtheatre.com

The Warfield Theatre, colloquially called The Warfield, is a 2,454 capacity event venue located in the Theatre District in downtown San Francisco, California, United States. It was built as a vaudeville theater and opened as the Loews Warfield on May 13, 1922.

== History ==
In the 1920s, The Warfield was a popular location that featured vaudeville and other major performances, such as Al Jolson, Louis Armstrong, and Charlie Chaplin. The theater opened as the Loews Warfield, named after David Warfield. It later became known as the Fox Warfield.

New life came to the Warfield in 1979 when Bob Dylan played 14 shows at the start of his first Gospel Tour in November 1979, and again 12 shows in November 1980 during his "A Musical Retrospective Tour". The Warfield had an appeal as a rock concert venue because it has more intimacy and better sound quality than an arena, yet has an occupancy of over 2,000 persons.

Like many historic theaters, its main floor had the seats removed in the 1980s for general admission and dancing. Prior to the removal of the seats, Joe Strummer of The Clash once refused to play unless the first two rows of seats were removed to allow for dancing. It is a favorite venue for performance among many entertainers.

In 1980, the Grateful Dead played 15 sold-out shows there, featuring both an acoustic and two electric sets. The shows were a celebration of the band's 15th anniversary and done as a show of appreciation for their loyal fans. These, along with a sold-out eight-night run at New York's Radio City Music Hall were recorded for release as two double albums; one, all acoustic called Reckoning, the other, electric, called Dead Set.

Jerry Garcia also made the Warfield a second home, performing a record 88 times there with his various side bands, when not touring with the Dead.

On May 9, 1991, Guns N' Roses performed the first of a few "secret warm-up theatre gigs" prior to the official opening of their Use Your Illusion Tour.

== Current use as music venue ==
In 2001, thrash metal band Slayer recorded the concert film War at the Warfield (2003) there.

On November 12, 2003, hard rock band Korn performed during a small club tour, which is a rarity for the band.

In May 2008, The Warfield changed management.

The final show with Bill Graham Presents performance by Phil Lesh ran until 3:30 a.m., May 19, 2008.

The venue was closed pending renovations by new lessee, Goldenvoice/AEG Live. It was reopened in September 2008, with George Lopez giving the first performance.

In September 2011, Dream Theater played their first U.S. show with Mike Mangini on the Dramatic Turn of Events Tour at the Warfield. This was their first show in the U.S. without founding drummer Mike Portnoy.

On July 2 2017, Swedish metal band Ghost performed at the Warfield as part of their Popestar Tour. The concert was the basis for their 2017 live album Ceremony and Devotion.

== Warfield Commons ==
In September 2026, Warfield Commons opened in the nine-story space above the Warfield Theatre, with 11 arts and media tenants, including Community Arts Stabilization Trust, KALW, and San Francisco Public Press
