= Van Ness station =

Metro station in San Francisco, California

Van Ness
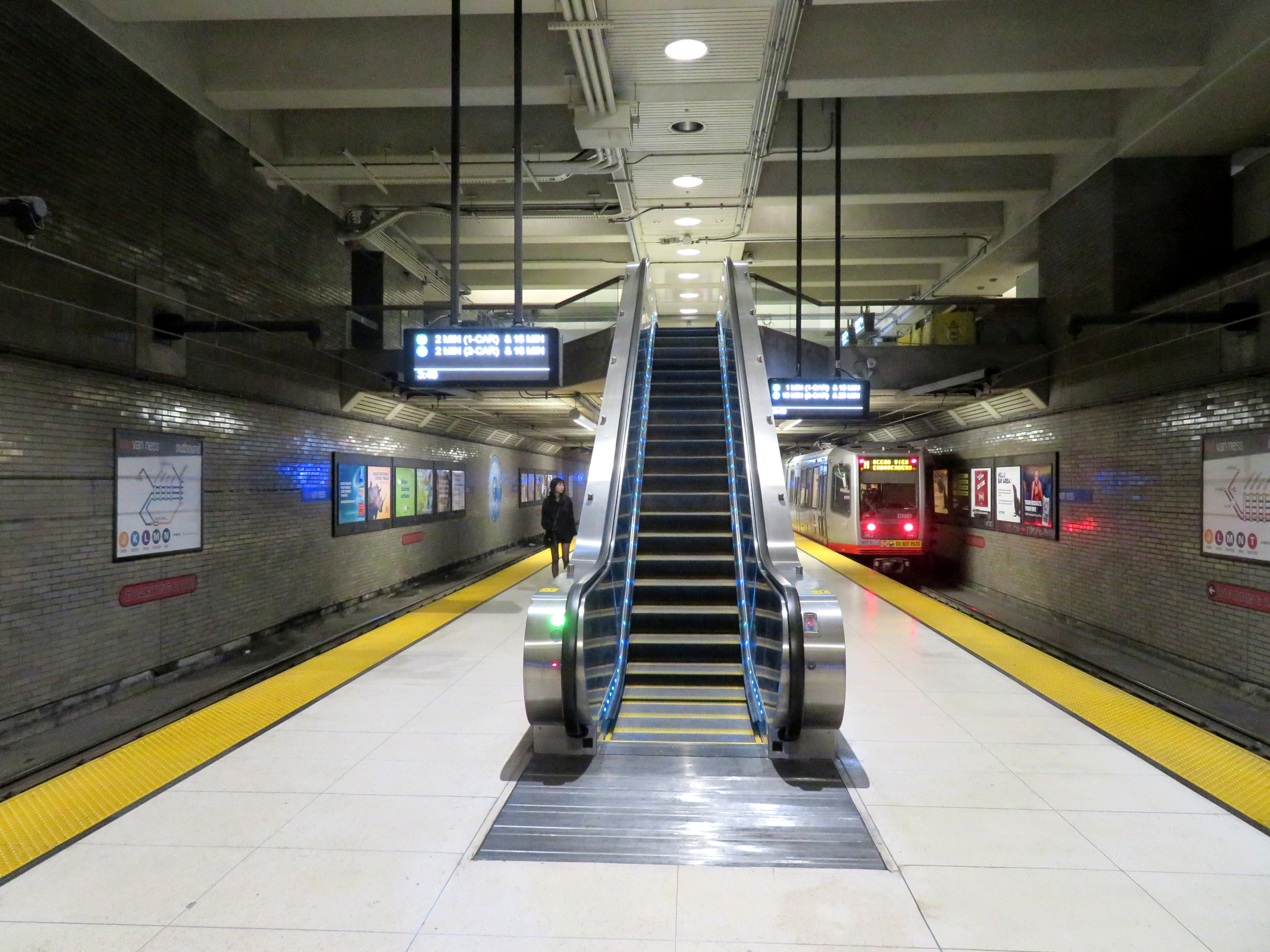
- Van Ness station with an inbound train in March 2019

General information
- Location: 1500 Market Street; San Francisco, California
- Coordinates: 37.775°N 122.419°W
- Owner: San Francisco Municipal Transportation Agency
- Line: Market Street subway
- Platforms: 1 high level island platform (Muni Metro); 2 low level side platforms (Muni surface)
- Tracks: 2 (Muni Metro); 2 (Muni surface)
- Connections: Muni: 6, 7, 9, 9R, Van Ness BRT (47, 49, 79X)

Construction
- Structure type: Underground
- Accessible: Yes
- Architect: Reid & Tarics Associates

History
- Opened: February 18, 1980

Services
Preceding station	Muni	Following station
Church and Duboce toward Balboa Park	J Church	Civic Center toward Embarcadero
Church toward Balboa Park	K Ingleside	Civic Center toward Embarcadero
Church toward SF Zoo	L Taraval	Civic Center toward Embarcadero
Church toward San Jose and Geneva (Balboa Park)	M Ocean View	Civic Center toward Embarcadero
Church and Duboce toward Ocean Beach	N Judah	Civic Center toward 4th and King
Church toward West Portal	S Shuttle	Civic Center toward Embarcadero
At surface stops
Market and Gough toward 17th Street and Castro	F Market & Wharves	Market and 9th Street / Market and Larkin toward Jones and Beach
through to Mission Street or 11th Street	Van Ness BRT	McAllister toward Union
Location

Van Ness station is an underground Muni Metro station on the Market Street subway at the intersection of Market Street and Van Ness Avenue (U.S. Route 101) in San Francisco, California. The station consists of a concourse mezzanine on the first floor down, and a single island platform on the second level down.

== History ==
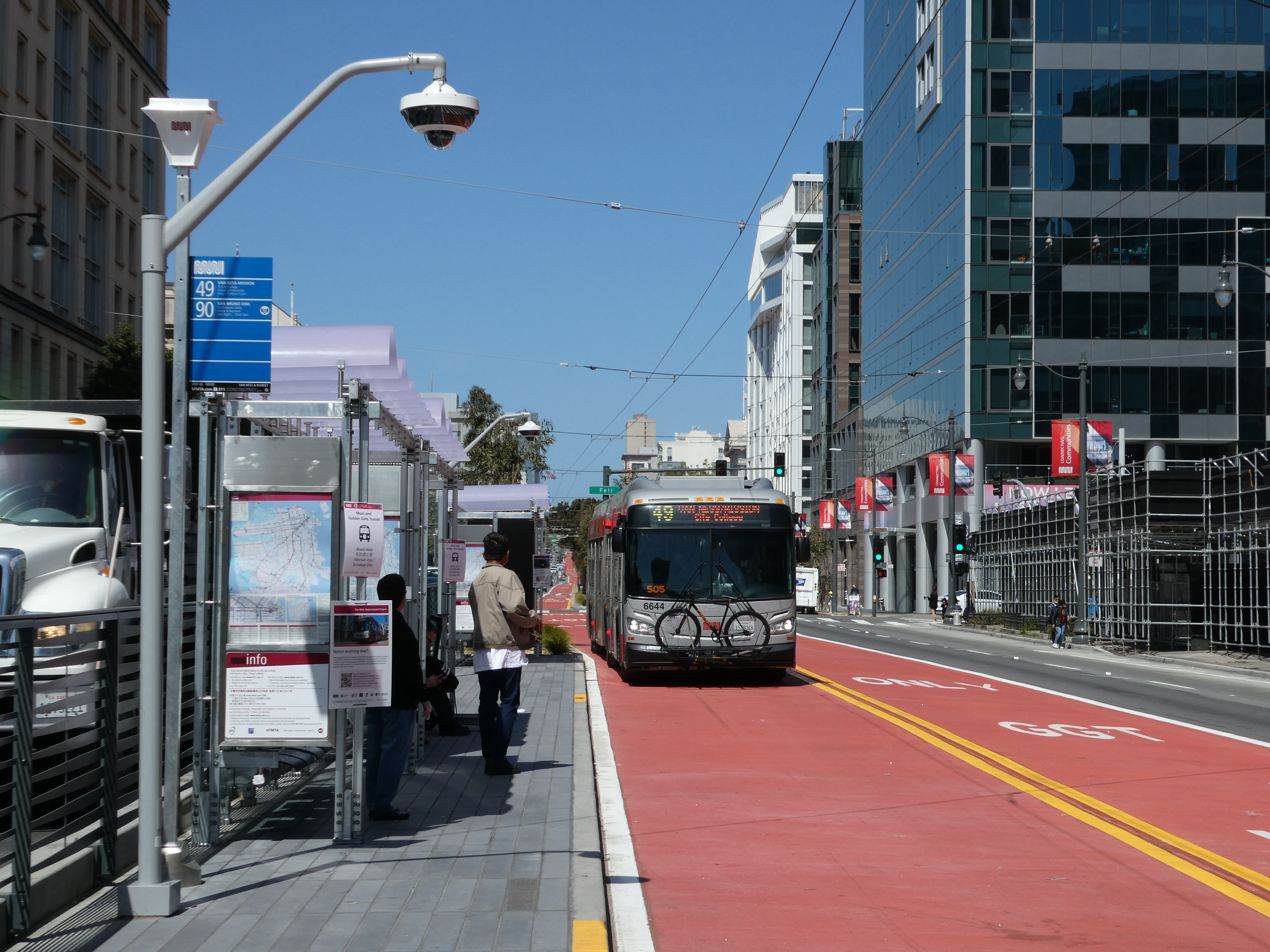
A southbound bus at the 2022-opened Van Ness Bus Rapid Transit stop

The station was constructed by BART as part of the Market Street subway. The BART Board approved the name "Van Ness" in December 1965. Service at the station began in February 1980.

The station has suffered flooding during heavy rainstorms, including one in October 2009, and another in December 2014 which damaged an electrical equipment room. In February 2017, the SFMTA signed a $1.9 million contract to repair water-damaged wiring in the room. Surface stops on Van Ness Avenue at Market Street are the southern end of the Van Ness Bus Rapid Transit route, which began service on April 1, 2022. The northeast headhouse was closed on March 11, 2023, for an estimated six months during construction of an adjacent building.

Under the proposed western variant of the planned Better Market Street project, the outbound F stop would be moved across the intersection.
