= Duboce and Church station =

Muni Metro light rail stop in San Francisco

Duboce and Church Church and Duboce
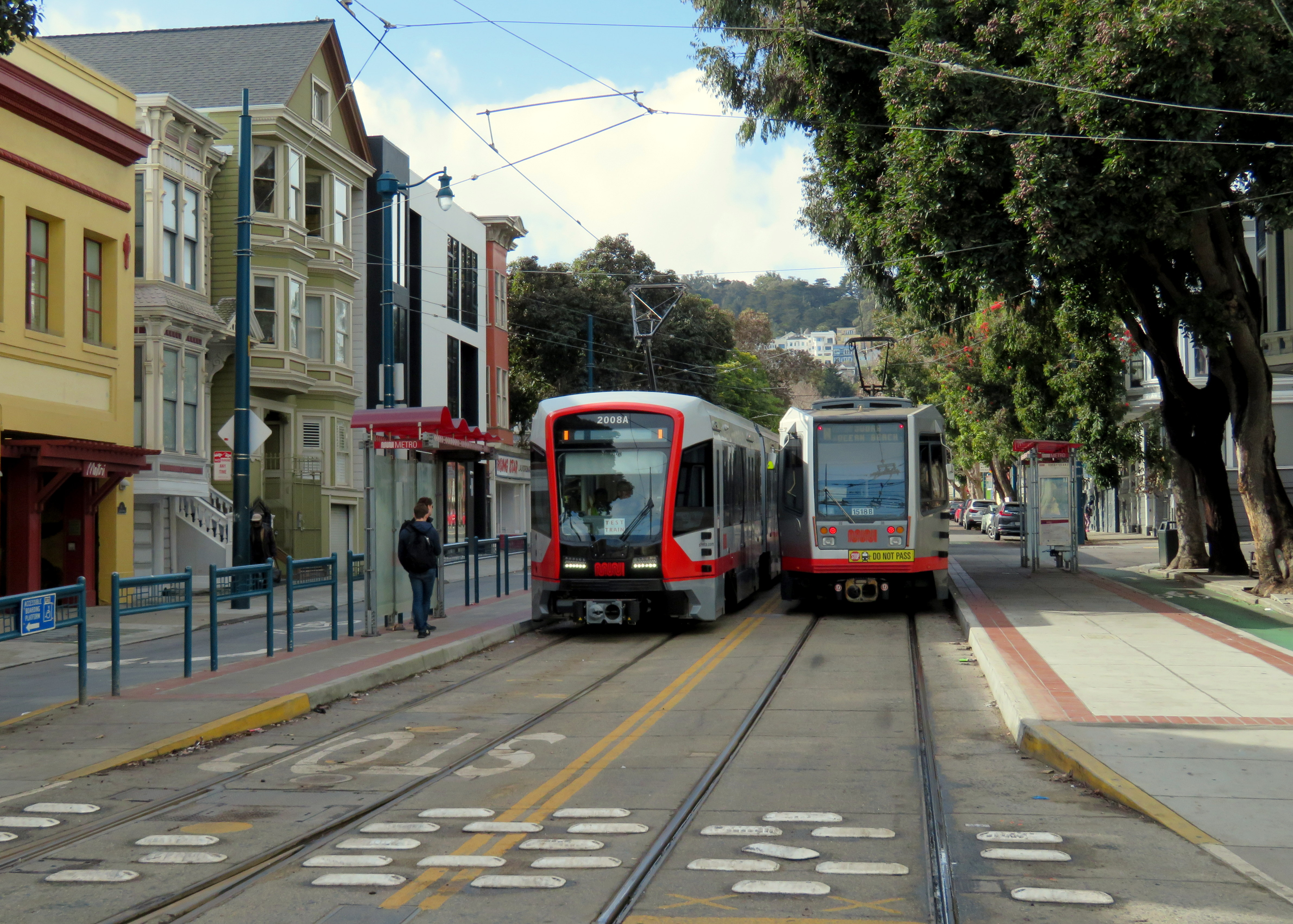
- N Judah trains at Duboce and Church in 2018

General information
- Location: Duboce Avenue and Church Street; San Francisco, California
- Coordinates: 37.76946°N 122.42912°W
- Platforms: 3 side platforms
- Tracks: 4
- Connections: Muni: 22, N Bus, N Owl

Construction
- Cycle facilities: Bay Wheels station
- Accessible: Yes

History
- Opened: 1895
- Rebuilt: October 21, 1928 c. 1972

Services
Preceding station	Muni	Following station
Church and Market / Church and 14th Street toward Balboa Park	J Church	Van Ness toward Embarcadero
Duboce and Noe toward Ocean Beach	N Judah	Van Ness toward 4th and King
Former services (1972–1982)
Preceding station	Muni	Following station
Church and Market toward Phelan Loop	K Ingleside	Market and Dolores / Market and Buchanan toward East Bay Terminal
Church and Market toward SF Zoo	L Taraval	Market and Dolores / Market and Buchanan toward East Bay Terminal
Church and Market toward Broad and Plymouth	M Ocean View	Market and Dolores / Market and Buchanan toward East Bay Terminal
Location

Duboce and Church (Church and Duboce for the J Church line) is a light rail stop on the Muni Metro J Church and N Judah lines, located in the Duboce Triangle neighborhood of San Francisco, California. Just east of the station, the two lines enter the Market Street subway. The stop originally opened with the 22 Fillmore line (now a trolleybus line) in 1895. The station has complex layout with two side platforms in the middle of Duboce Avenue (traffic islands) for the N Judah, one side platform in the middle of Church Street for northbound J Church trains entering the Market Street subway, and two mini-high platforms at the subway portal which provides access to both lines for people with disabilities.

The stop is also served by bus route 22, plus the N Bus and N Owl bus routes, which provide service along the N Judah line during the early morning and late night hours respectively when trains do not operate.

== History ==
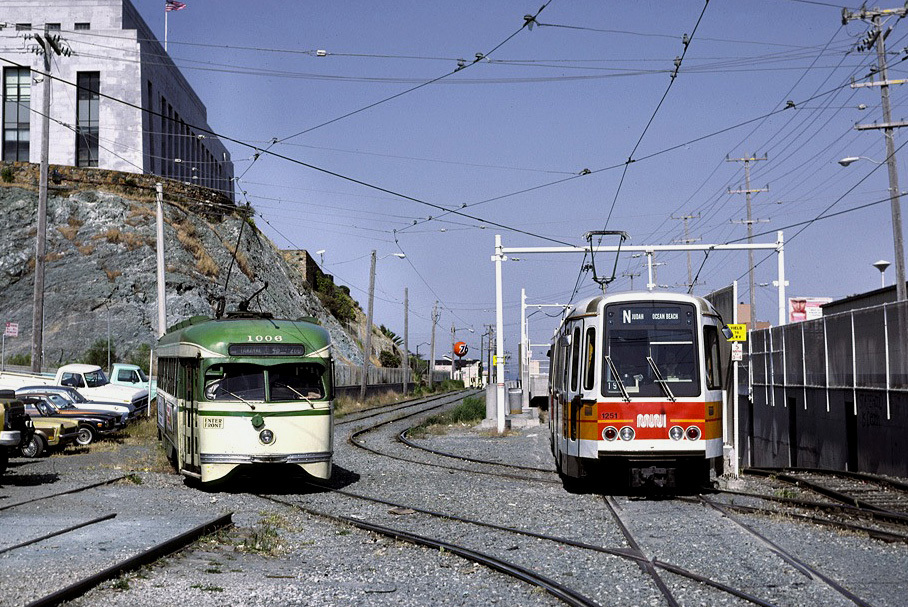
Duboce Portal flanked by the Duboce Yard, seen in 1980.

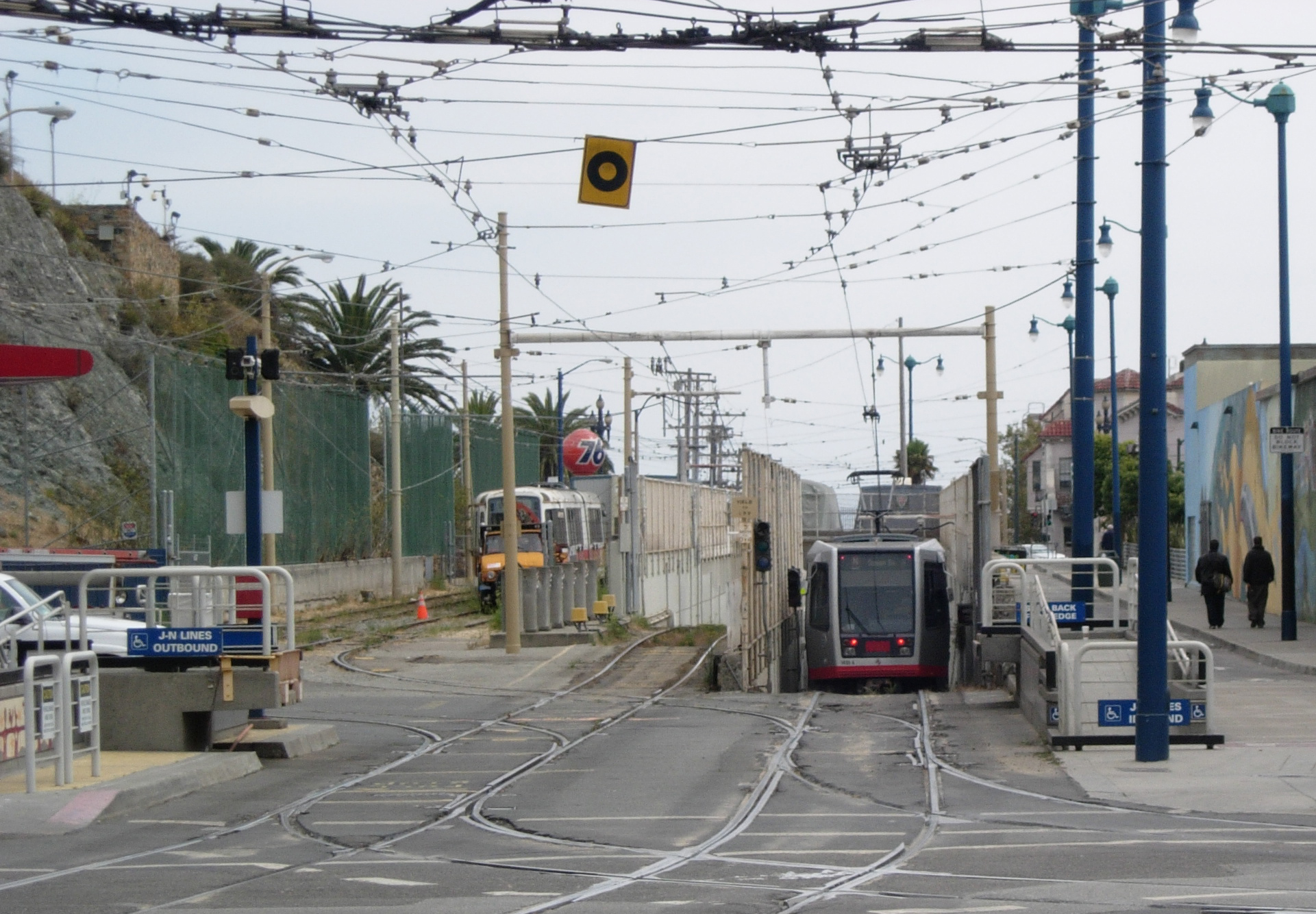
Duboce Portal in 2006 with accessible platforms.

The Market Street Railway opened its 22 Fillmore streetcar line in 1895; it jogged from Church Street to Fillmore Street on a short section of Duboce Avenue. On October 21, 1928, the San Francisco Municipal Railway (Muni) N Judah streetcar line opened. It ran on Duboce Avenue between Market Street and the Sunset Tunnel, and shared track and overhead wires with the 22 for one block. Muni took over the ex-Market Street Railway system in September 1944. Muni converted a number of streetcar lines, including the 22, to trolleybus on July 31, 1948; it was rerouted via Hermann Street one block to the north to avoid conflicts between the overhead wires for trolleybuses and streetcars.

Beginning in the late 1960s, construction of the Market Street subway required diversions of Muni's five remaining streetcar lines, which ran on Market Street. The largest diversion routed K, L, and M cars from the Twin Peaks Tunnel onto new tracks on 17th Avenue, joining the J Church on Church Street, and continuing past Market Street on new tracks to join the N Judah tracks on Duboce. An inbound concrete boarding platform was built on Church Street at Duboce Avenue; outbound cars stopped further south on Church Street at Market Street. (Boarding platforms were also built on Duboce Avenue for the N.) Streetcars on the J, K, L, and M lines were routed onto the diversion route on December 2, 1972, though only outbound cars used the diversion north of Market Street until 1973. The new Duboce Portal was constructed on Duboce Avenue east of Church, parallel to the operating surface streetcar line.

N Judah trains began using the new portal on weekdays on February 18, 1980 – the first Muni Metro service. On December 17, 1980, the K, L, and M lines began Muni Metro service (and ceased using the diversion route) on weekdays. J Church trains began using the new portal on June 17, 1981. Finally, on September 19, 1982, weekend service was replaced by buses (and converted to Muni Metro trains on November 20), leaving only the inbound J Church stopping on Church at Duboce. This station will be the northern terminus for the J Church service starting in August 2020, when Muni service is projected to return after the COVID-19 pandemic.

Accessible sections of high-level platforms were later built east of Church Street, near the entrance to the portal. These accessible platforms serve both lines; because the J Church stop at Market Street is not accessible, outbound J Church trains serve Duboce and Church if required by a passenger (but otherwise do not stop). Since the diversion in 1972, Duboce Avenue between Church Street and Market Street is not open to automobiles. A sidewalk and bike lanes run along the south side of the portal, and a 2-track Muni yard (the pre-1982 route to Market Street) sits on the north side. A Muni operator facility is located next to the yard.

Failures of the interlocking between the J and N lines can cause significant cascading delays in the Market Street subway. Eight such failures occurred between 2017 and early 2019. As part of August 2020 changes to Muni Metro, the J became an all-surface line to avoid this issue. The J initially terminated at the inbound platform on Church Street at Market Street, providing an accessible transfer between the J and subway trains. A mini-high platform was to be constructed on the inbound platform at Church and Duboce, and an outbound mini-high platform built on Church Street south of Market Street, allowing the J to be re-extended slightly to Duboce Street in October 2020.

However, on August 25, 2020 – just days after the changes – all Muni Metro service was again replaced by buses. J Church rail service resumed on December 19, 2020, with both new mini-high platforms in use and Duboce as the new terminus. It remained as the terminus until February 19, 2022, when J Church service was extended back to Embarcadero.
