= Carl and Hillway station =

Light rail stop in San Francisco, California

Carl and Hillway
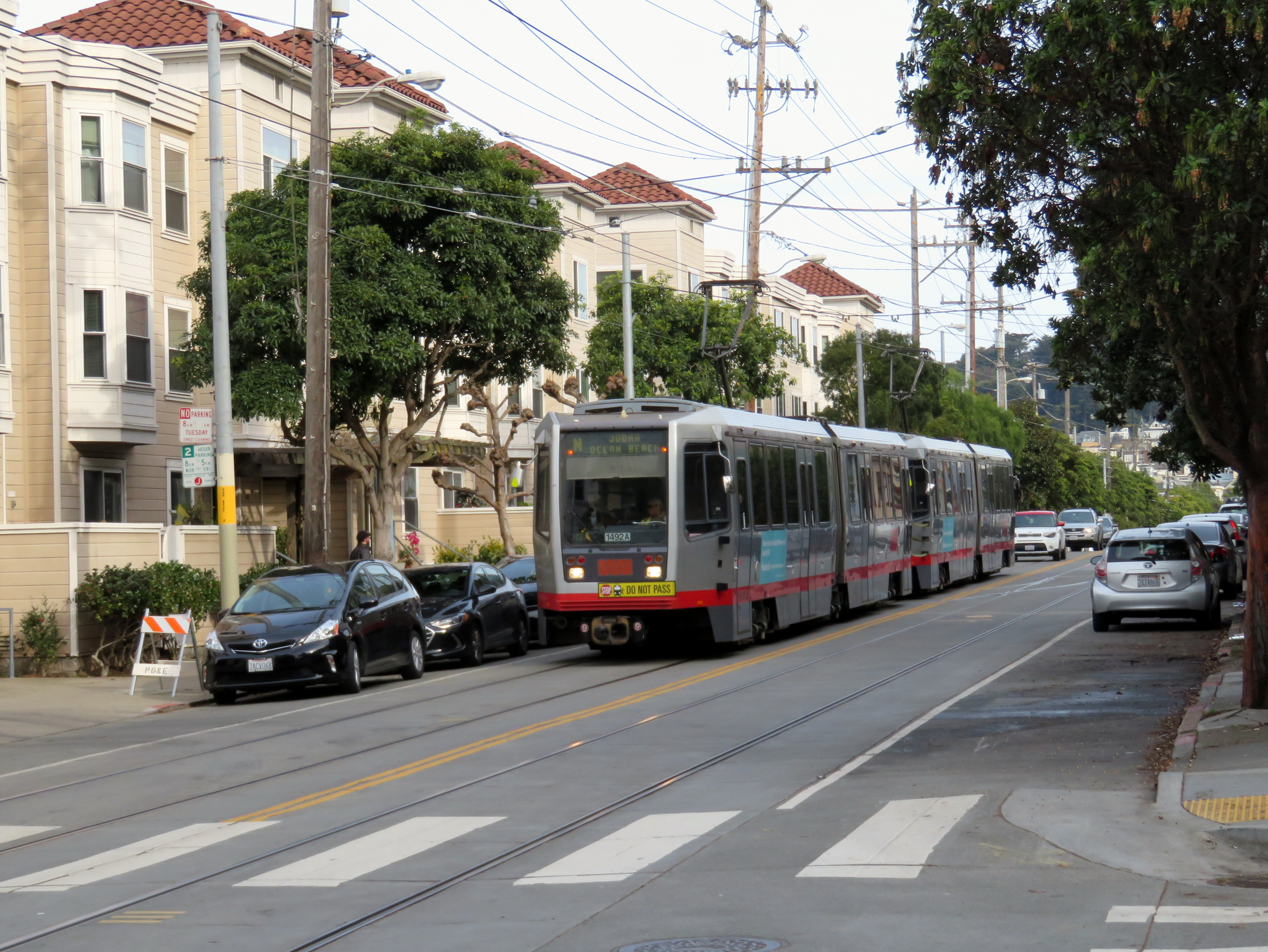
- An outbound train at Carl and Hillway in January 2018

General information
- Location: Carl Street at Hillway Avenue; San Francisco, California
- Coordinates: 37°45′54″N 122°27′24″W
- Platforms: None, passengers wait on sidewalk
- Tracks: 2

Construction
- Accessible: No

History
- Opened: October 21, 1928

Services
Preceding station	Muni	Following station
UCSF Parnassus toward Ocean Beach	N Judah	Carl and Stanyan toward 4th and King
Location

Carl and Hillway station is a light rail stop on the Muni Metro N Judah line, located in the Inner Sunset neighborhood of San Francisco, California. The station opened with the N Judah line on October 21, 1928. Trains stop at marked poles; there are no platforms or shelters. The stop is not accessible to people with disabilities.

The stop is also served by the N Bus and N Owl bus routes, which provide service along the N Judah line during the early morning and late night hours respectively when trains do not operate.

A crossover is located at the stop, allowing outbound trains to be switched back inbound. In September 2016, Muni began running a pair of one-car shuttles between Embarcadero station and Carl and Hillway during morning rush hour to reduce crowding on the inner section of the line. A study after one month showed the shuttles had increased capacity on the inner part of the line by 18% and reduced the number of passengers unable to board overcrowded trains by 63%.
