= Montgomery Street station =

Rapid transit station in San Francisco, California, US

Montgomery
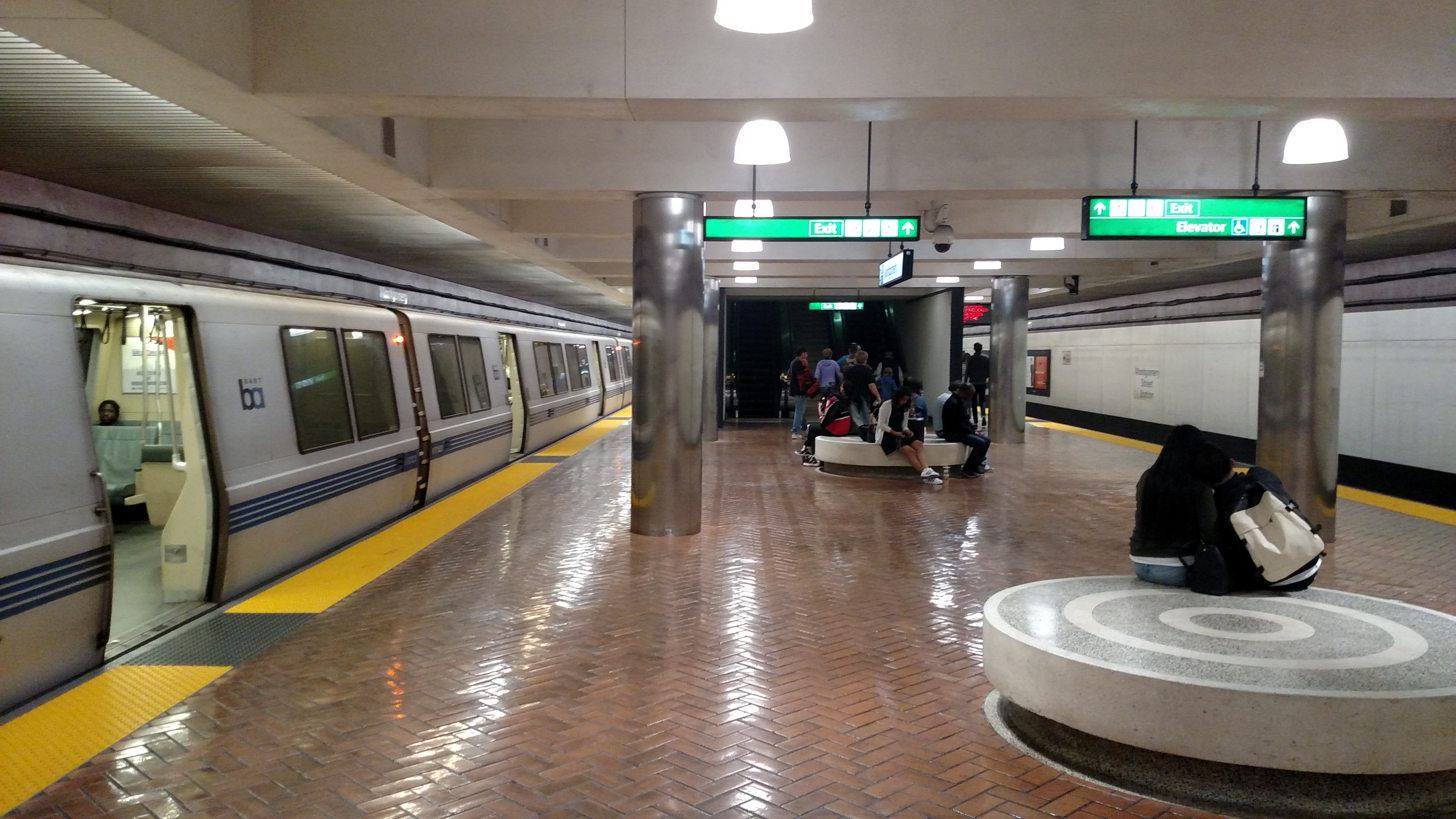
- BART train at Montgomery Street station in 2017

General information
- Location: 598 Market Street; San Francisco, California
- Coordinates: 37.789355°N 122.401942°W
- Owner: Bay Area Rapid Transit District
- Lines: Market Street subway BART M-Line
- Platforms: 1 island platform (BART); 1 island platform (Muni Metro); 2 side platforms (Muni surface)
- Tracks: 2 wide gauge (BART); 2 standard gauge (Muni Metro); 2 standard gauge (Muni surface)
- Connections: Muni, Golden Gate Transit, SamTrans

Construction
- Structure type: Underground
- Accessible: Yes
- Architect: Skidmore, Owings & Merrill

Other information
- Station code: BART: MONT

History
- Opened: November 5, 1973 (BART); February 18, 1980 (Muni Metro)

Passengers
- 2025: 14,087 (weekday average) (BART)
Services
Preceding station	Bay Area Rapid Transit	Following station
Powell toward Daly City	Blue Line	Embarcadero toward Dublin/Pleasanton
Powell toward Daly City	Green Line	Embarcadero toward Berryessa
Powell toward Millbrae	Red Line	Embarcadero toward Richmond
Powell toward SFO or Millbrae	Yellow Line	Embarcadero toward Antioch via Pittsburg/Bay Point
Preceding station	Muni	Following station
Powell toward Balboa Park	J Church	Embarcadero Terminus
Powell toward Balboa Park	K Ingleside	Embarcadero Terminus
Powell toward SF Zoo	L Taraval	Embarcadero Terminus
Powell toward San Jose and Geneva (Balboa Park)	M Ocean View	Embarcadero Terminus
Powell toward Ocean Beach	N Judah	Embarcadero toward 4th and King
Powell toward West Portal	S Shuttle	Embarcadero Terminus
At Market and 2nd Street / Market and New Montgomery
Market and 3rd Street / Market and Kearny toward 17th Street and Castro	F Market & Wharves	Market and 1st Street / Market and Battery toward Jones and Beach
Location

Montgomery Street station (often called Montgomery station) is a combined BART and Muni Metro rapid transit subway station in the Market Street subway in downtown San Francisco. Located under Market Street between Montgomery Street and Sansome Street, it serves the Financial District neighborhood and surrounding areas. The three-level station has a large fare mezzanine level, with separate platform levels for Muni Metro and BART below. Montgomery Street and Embarcadero station to the north are typically the two busiest stations in the BART system.

The station is served by the BART Red, Yellow, Green, and Blue lines, and the Muni Metro J Church, K Ingleside, L Taraval, M Ocean View, N Judah, and S Shuttle lines.

== Station layout ==
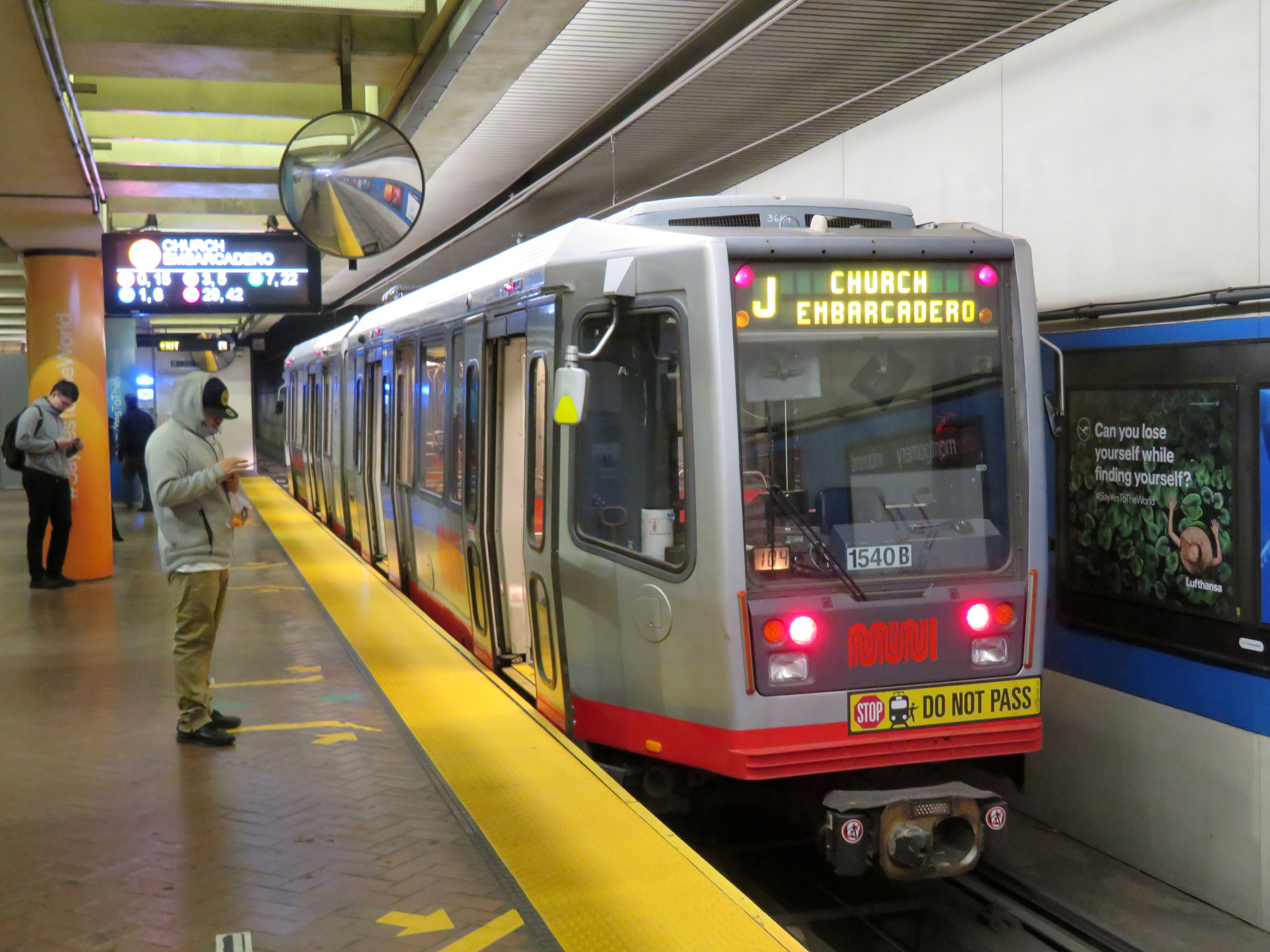
A Muni Metro train at the station in 2018

Like the three other shared Muni/BART stations in the Market Street subway, Montgomery has three underground levels. The first level is a fare mezzanine, with two Muni paid areas and two BART paid areas. The second level has a single island platform for Muni Metro, and the third level has an island platform for BART. The station has seven street entrances along its length, plus underground entrances to the One Sansome Street and 44 Montgomery buildings. Montgomery and nearby Powell, both designed by Skidmore, Owings & Merrill, have similar designs – including distinctive domed hexagonal "bubble tiles" on the mezzanine level.

== History ==
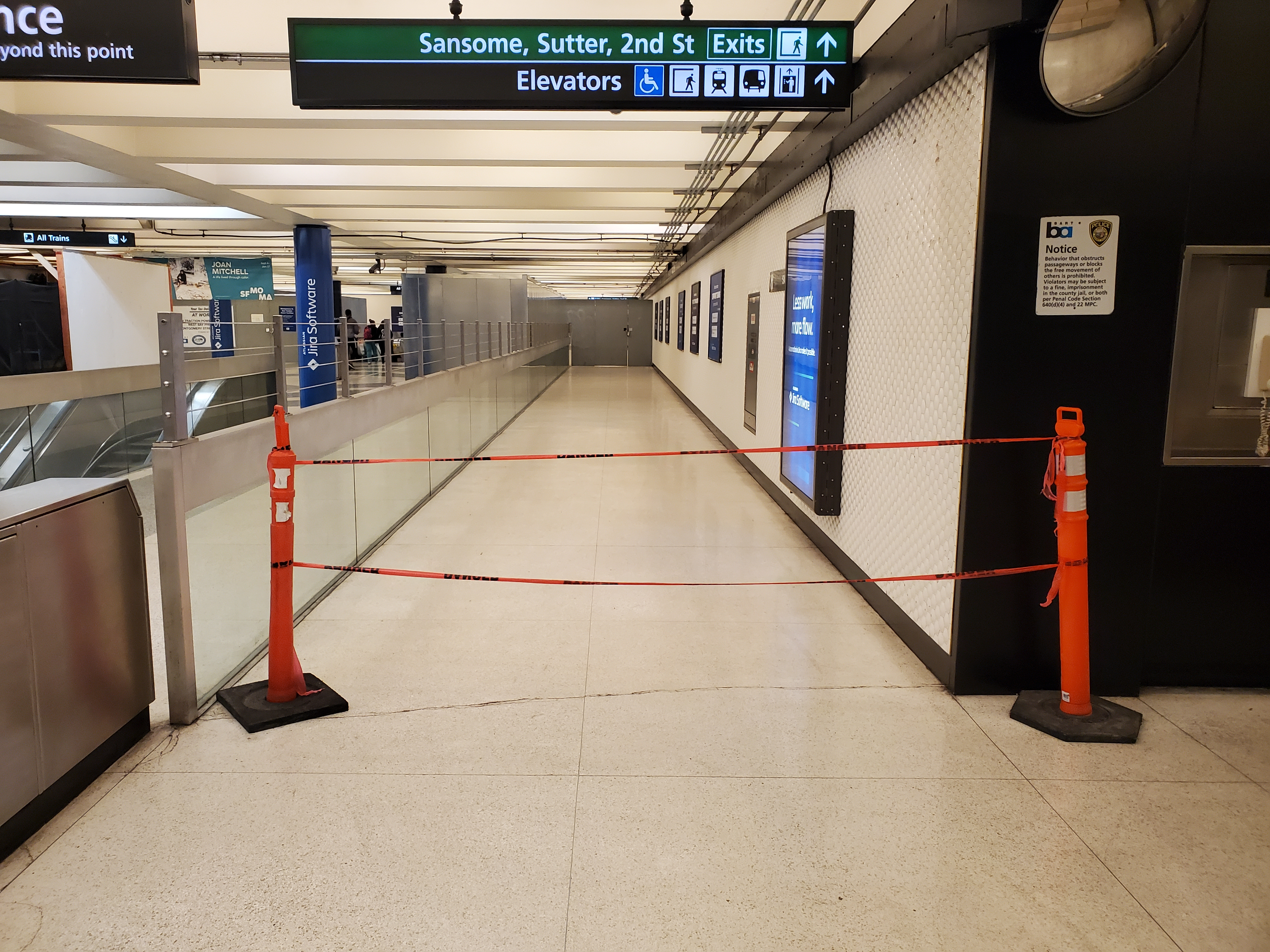
Portion of the mezzanine temporarily closed for construction of a BART substation

The BART Board approved the name "Montgomery Street" in December 1965. The under-construction station was featured in the 1971 film The Organization. BART service at the station began on November 5, 1973, followed by Muni Metro service on February 18, 1980. Prior to the COVID-19 pandemic, some morning rush-hour trains on the Antioch line short turned at Montgomery to provide additional Transbay service. From February 16, 2020, to September 20, 2020, and again from March 22, 2021, to August 1, 2021, Dublin/Pleasanton line trains terminated at Montgomery on some Sundays due to single-tracking in the Market Street Subway.

Following the 2015 addition of a canopy over an escalator at 19th Street Oakland station, which reduced escalator downtime by one-third, BART decided to add canopies to all downtown Oakland and San Francisco entrances. Construction of the Market Street entrances at Montgomery station began in February 2021, with the New Montgomery Street entrance closed on January 3, 2022. The entrance was completed on April 17, 2023, at which time the Montgomery Street/Post Street entrance was closed for construction. The Sutter Street entrance closed on October 18, 2023, after the Post Street entrance was finished. The Sutter Street entrance reopened May 30, 2024; the Sansome Street entrance then closed until November 2024. The completion of all entrances is expected in 2027. The canopies at Montgomery station include artwork by Rosana Castrillo Diaz.

The entrances on the southern side of the station were closed from April 13, 2020, to May 15, 2021, due to low ridership during the COVID-19 pandemic. Thirteen BART stations, including Montgomery, did not originally have faregates for passengers using the elevator. In 2020, BART started a project to add faregates to elevators at these stations. The new faregate on the BART platform at Montgomery was installed in December 2020. Installation of second-generation BART faregates took place in October and November 2024.

On September 13, 2021, the center portion of the mezzanine level and the southern entrance east of 2nd Street were closed for construction of a BART traction power substation. The entrance and mezzanine passage were expected to reopen in 2023. The substation ultimately began use in 2026. Bathrooms at underground BART stations were closed after the September 11 attacks in 2001 due to security concerns. The bathroom at Montgomery station reopened on June 28, 2022, after a renovation, with an attendant on duty during all operating hours. Under the planned Better Market Street project, the inbound F stop would be discontinued to reduce travel times.

== Connections ==
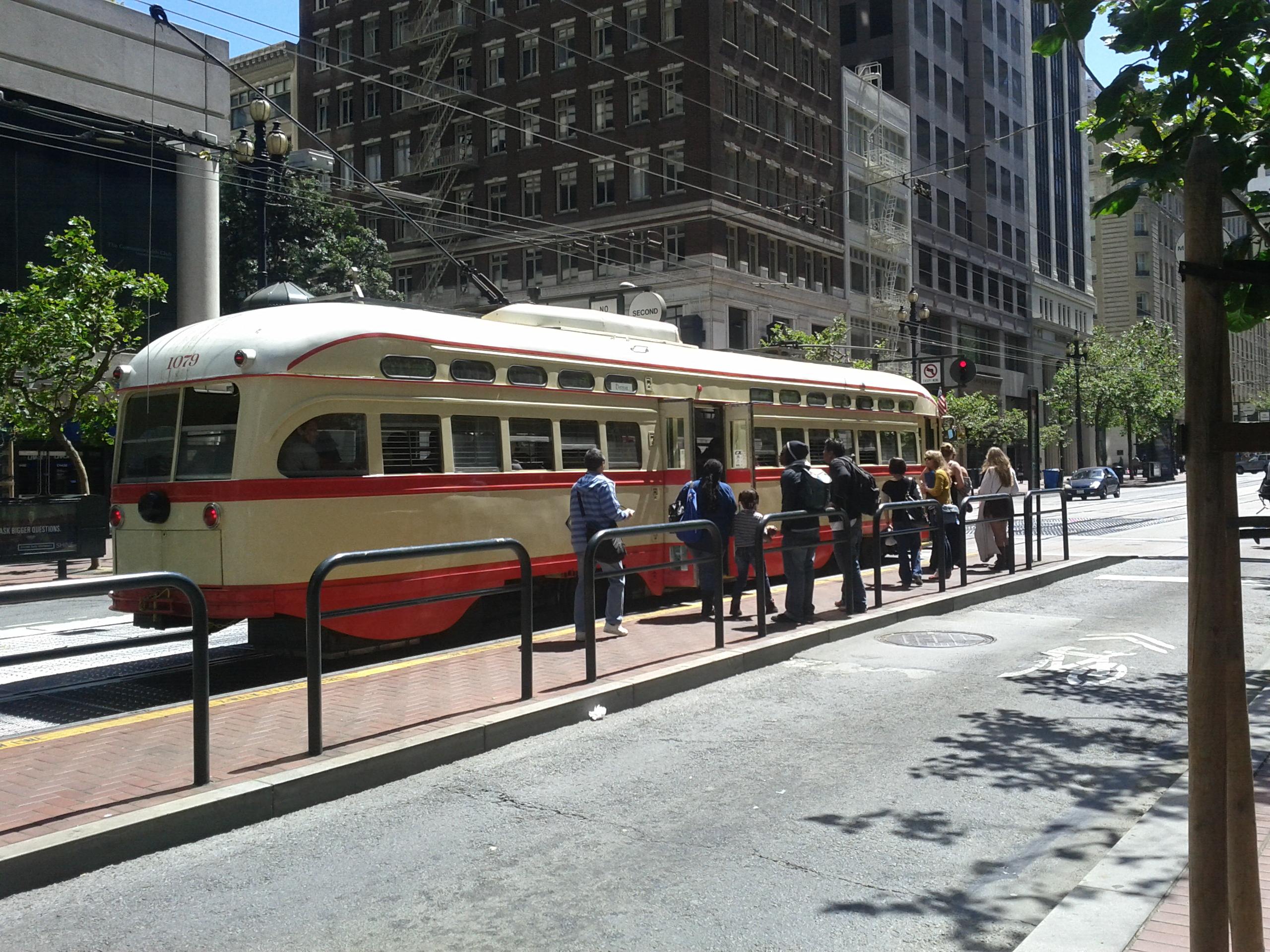
F Market and Wharves streetcar at Market and 2nd Street

Muni's F Market and Wharves heritage streetcar line stops on the surface at Market and 2nd Street (outbound) and Market and New Montgomery (inbound). The station is also served by a number of Muni bus and trolleybus routes:

- Local: 2, 3, 5, 6, 7, 8, 9, 10, 12, 15, 21, 30, 31, 38, 45
- Rapid: 5R, 9R, 38R
- Express: 7X, 8AX, 8BX, 81X
- Owl service: 91 Owl, J Bus, K Bus, K Owl, L Bus, L Owl, M Bus, N Owl, N Bus

AC Transit serves Montgomery Street station with the 800 All Nighter route during hours that BART is not operating.

Additional Muni (14, 14R, 14X), Golden Gate Transit (30, 70, 101, 101X), and SamTrans (292, 397, 398, FCX) bus routes run on Mission Street, one block away. The Salesforce Transit Center, located about 1/4 mile (0.40 km) to the east, is the primary San Francisco terminal for AC Transit transbay routes, WestCAT, Greyhound lines, Amtrak Thruway Motorcoach buses, some Golden Gate Transit routes, and Muni route 25.
