= Upper Market Street =

Thoroughfare in San Francisco, California

Upper Market Street is a segment of Market Street in San Francisco, California, running southwest from the intersection with Church and Octavia streets toward the Castro District, where it terminates at the intersection of Castro and 17th Streets. It forms the northern boundary of the Castro neighborhood and passes through or borders the Duboce Triangle, Eureka Valley, and Corona Heights neighborhoods. The street is served by the F Market & Wharves heritage streetcar line, operated by the San Francisco Municipal Railway (Muni).

== History ==
Market Street was surveyed in 1847 by civil engineer Jasper O'Farrell, who designed it as San Francisco's widest boulevard, running diagonally from the northeastern waterfront toward the hills of Twin Peaks. The land through which Upper Market Street runs was, at the time, part of the Rancho San Miguel land grant held by José de Jesús Noé, one of the final Mexican alcaldes of Yerba Buena. In 1854, businessman John M. Horner purchased most of that rancho for $70,000 and subdivided it, mapping out streets in what he called "Horner's Addition."

The arrival of streetcar service along Market Street in the second half of the 19th century opened the Eureka Valley area to residential settlement. The neighborhood attracted successive waves of working-class immigrant communities, including German and Irish populations. From the 1930s through the early 1960s, the area around the Castro and Upper Market was identified primarily as an Irish-American, working-class enclave; life in the district centered on institutions such as Most Holy Redeemer Catholic Church, built two blocks off Castro Street in 1900, and on city employment as firefighters, police officers, and laborers.

Beginning in the late 1950s and accelerating through the 1960s, younger families left the neighborhood for newer suburban housing in the East Bay and the Peninsula; the 1964 repeal of a post-1906 earthquake regulation requiring city employees to live within San Francisco further accelerated this departure. In 1954, a Safeway that had been a retail anchor on Castro Street closed following the opening of a larger store at Market and Church.

== Civic role ==
By the early 1970s, the affordable housing stock along Upper Market Street and the surrounding Castro neighborhood attracted gay residents and business owners, who began restoring Victorian homes and opening businesses along Upper Market, 18th, and Castro Streets. Harvey Milk opened a camera shop at 575 Castro Street in 1972; his activism on behalf of the neighborhood later led to his election to the San Francisco Board of Supervisors, making him the first openly gay person elected to public office in California.

In 2019, the San Francisco Board of Supervisors unanimously passed an ordinance, authored by Supervisor Rafael Mandelman, establishing the Castro LGBTQ Cultural District, whose stated mission is to preserve and promote the cultural legacy of the Castro and Upper Market area for LGBTQ communities.

== Context ==
The San Francisco General Plan's Market and Octavia Area Plan identifies Upper Market as one of the plan area's Neighborhood Commercial Districts and calls for encouraging housing and retail infill along Upper Market Street to support its commercial vitality.

Upper Market Street is served at its southwestern end by the F Market & Wharves line, a heritage streetcar operated by Muni using restored vintage rolling stock. The F line's western terminus is at the intersection of Castro and Market Streets. After the Market Street streetcar tracks were retained following the opening of the Muni Metro subway in 1982, the Board of Supervisors approved permanent F line service; Muni restored tracks to Upper Market Street in 1987 and the F line began full-time year-round service on September 1, 1995. Below street level, the Castro Street Station provides access to the Muni Metro subway.
