= Market and 9th Street / Market and Larkin stations =

Market and 9th Street Market and Larkin
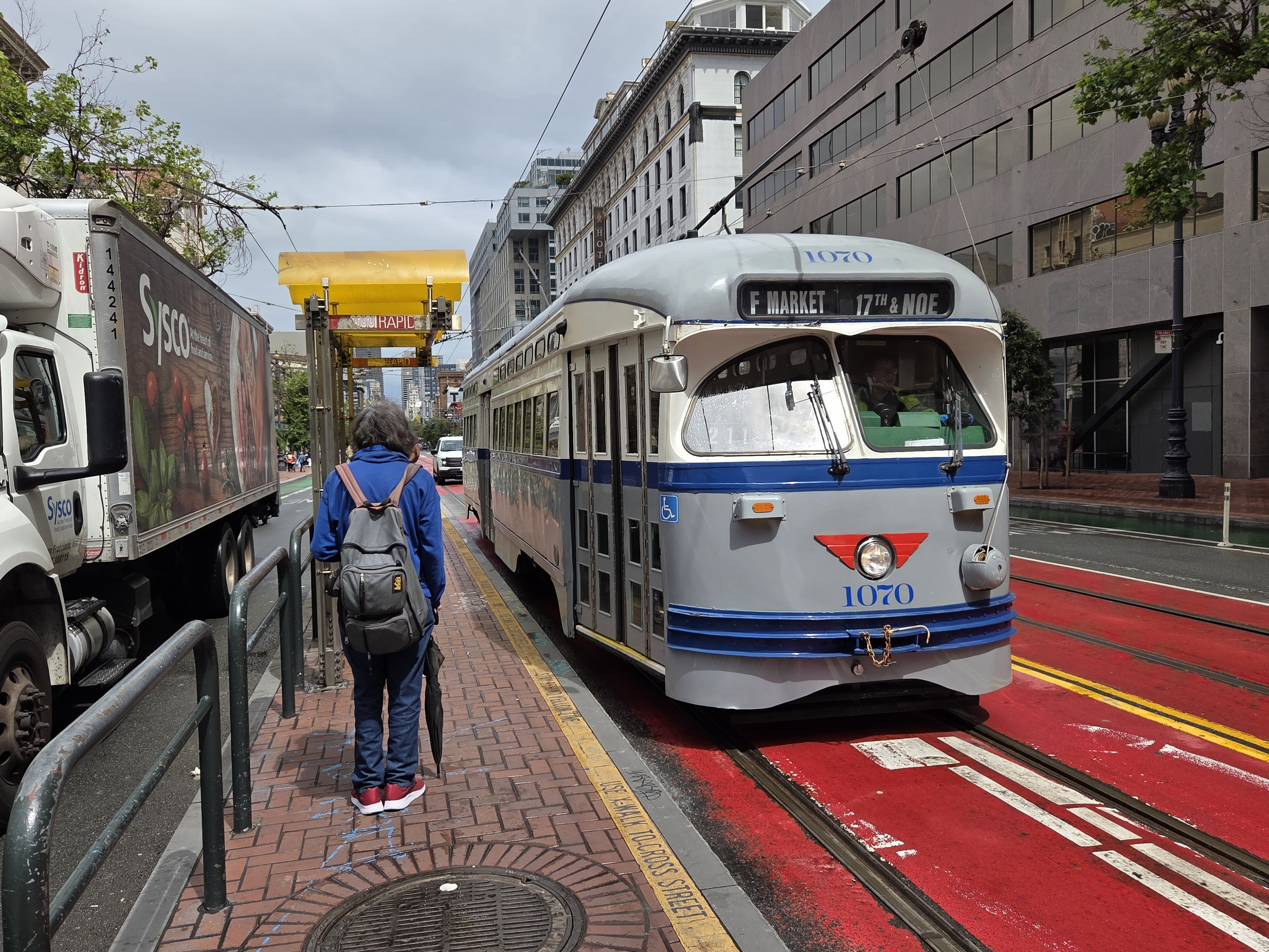
- Westbound streetcar at Larkin in 2026

General information
- Location: Market Street at 9th and Larkin Streets; San Francisco, California
- Coordinates: 37°46′39″N 122°24′59″W
- Platforms: 2 side platforms
- Tracks: 2

Construction
- Accessible: No

History
- Rebuilt: September 1, 1995

Services
Preceding station	Muni	Following station
Market and Van Ness toward 17th Street and Castro	F Market & Wharves	Market and 8th Street / Market and Hyde toward Jones and Beach
Location

Market and 9th Street (eastbound) and Market and Larkin (westbound) are a pair of one-way light rail stations in San Francisco, California, United States, serving the San Francisco Municipal Railway F Market & Wharves heritage railway line. They are located on Market Street at the intersections of 9th Street and Larkin Street. The low-level platforms are also utilized by several bus and trolleybus routes.

Under the planned Better Market Street project, this stop would be eliminated to reduce travel times.
