= Market and 3rd Street / Market and Kearny stations =

Market and 3rd Street Market and Kearny
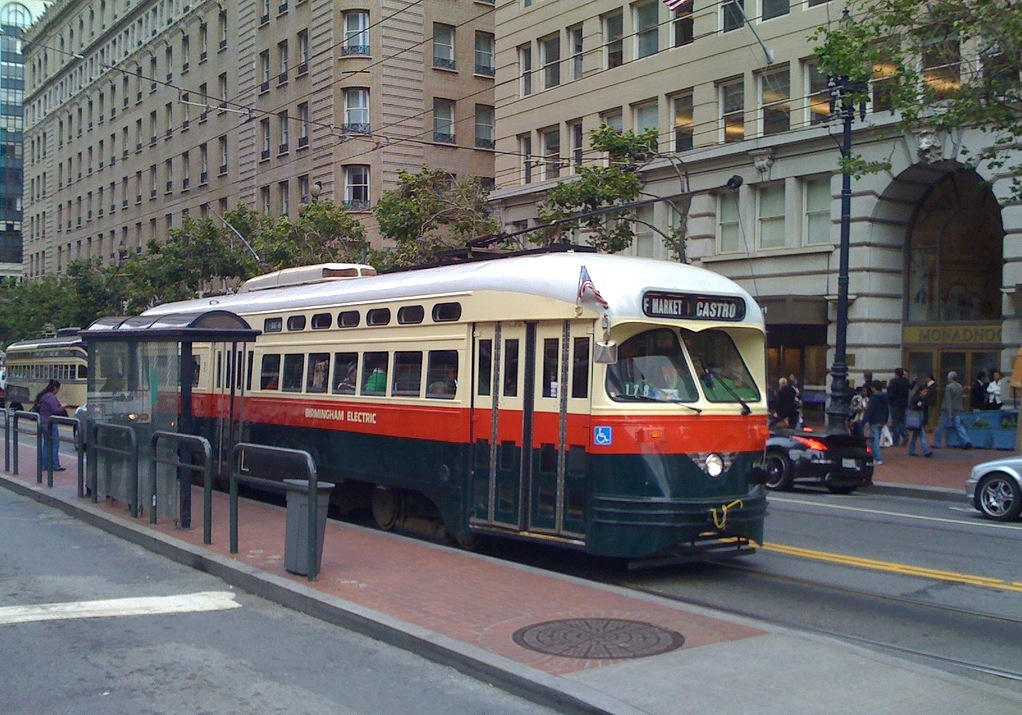
- Streetcar at Market and Kearny in 2010

General information
- Location: Market Street at 3rd and Kearny Streets; San Francisco, California
- Coordinates: 37°47′15″N 122°24′12″W
- Platforms: 2 side platforms
- Tracks: 2

Construction
- Accessible: Yes

History
- Rebuilt: September 1, 1995

Services
Preceding station	Muni	Following station
Market and 4th Street / Market and Stockton toward 17th Street and Castro	F Market & Wharves	Market and 2nd Street / Market and New Montgomery toward Jones and Beach
Location

Market and 3rd Street (eastbound) and Market and Kearny (westbound) are a pair of one-way light rail stations in San Francisco, California, United States, serving the San Francisco Municipal Railway F Market & Wharves heritage railway line. They are located on Market Street at the intersections of 3rd Street and Kearny Street. The low-level platforms are also utilized by several bus and trolleybus routes.

Under the planned Better Market Street project, the outbound F stop would be discontinued to reduce travel times.
