= UCSF Parnassus station =

Muni Metro light rail stop in San Francisco

UCSF Parnassus
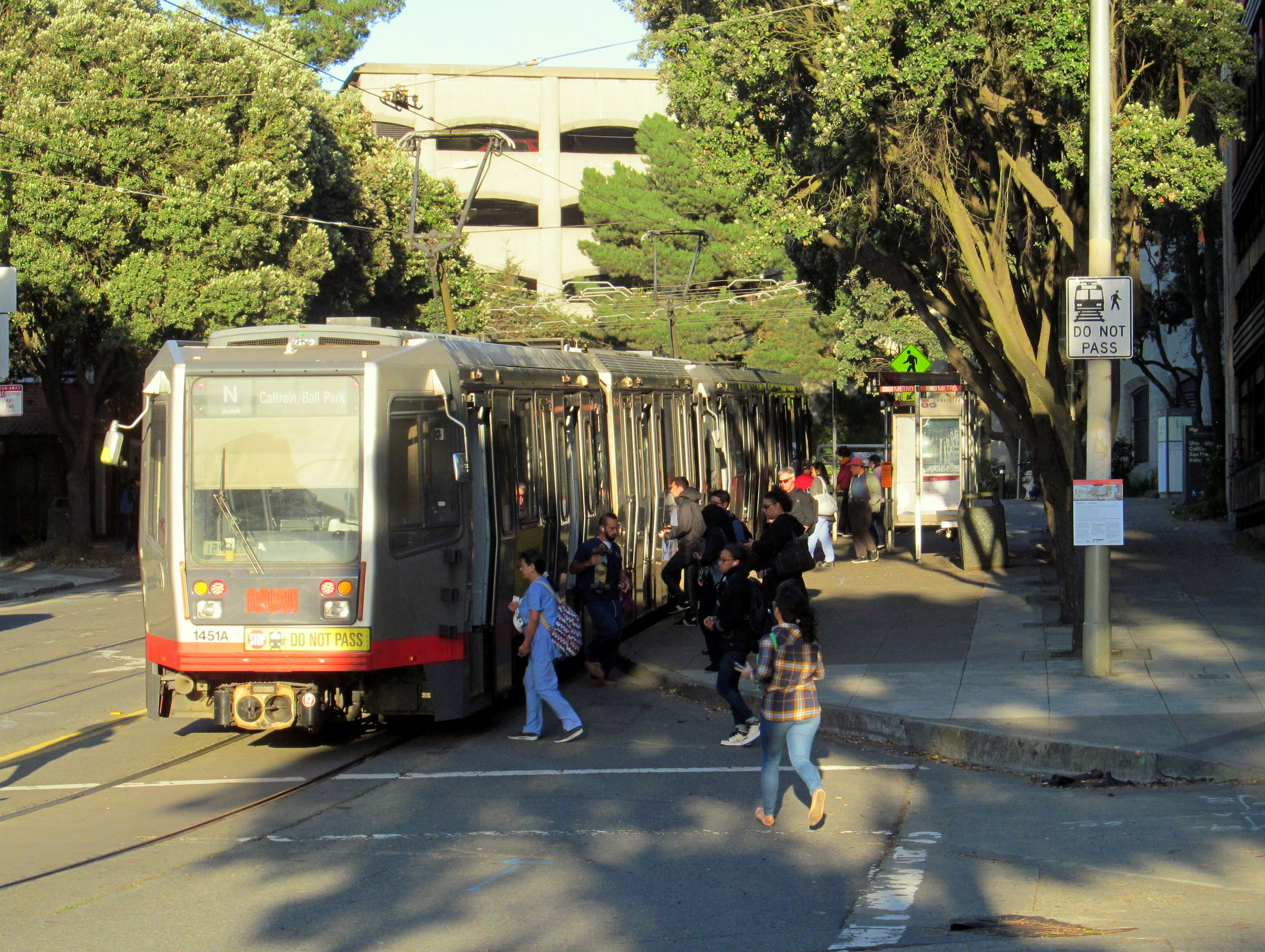
- Inbound train at Irving and Arguello in September 2017

General information
- Location: Irving Street at 2nd Avenue; San Francisco, California
- Coordinates: 37°45′52″N 122°27′32″W
- Platforms: 2 side platforms
- Tracks: 2

Construction
- Accessible: Yes

History
- Opened: October 21, 1928
- Rebuilt: 1990s

Services
Preceding station	Muni	Following station
Irving and 5th/6th Avenues toward Ocean Beach	N Judah	Carl and Hillway toward 4th and King
Location

UCSF Parnassus station is a pair of light rail stops on the Muni Metro N Judah line, located in the Inner Sunset neighborhood of San Francisco, California. The stops are located at Irving and 2nd Avenue in the westbound direction and Irving and Arguello in the eastbound direction. They opened with the N Judah line on October 21, 1928. They are the primary stop for the Parnassus campus of the University of California, San Francisco.

The inbound stop has a long bulb-out serving as the platform, with a shelter and handicapped-accessible mini-high platform at the eastern end. The outbound stop has a shelter east of 2nd Avenue (but no bulb-out); the mini-high platform is located west of 2nd Avenue.

The stop is also served by the N Bus and N Owl bus routes, which provide service along the N Judah line during the early morning and late night hours respectively when trains do not operate.
