= Carl and Cole station =

Light rail stop in San Francisco, California

Carl and Cole
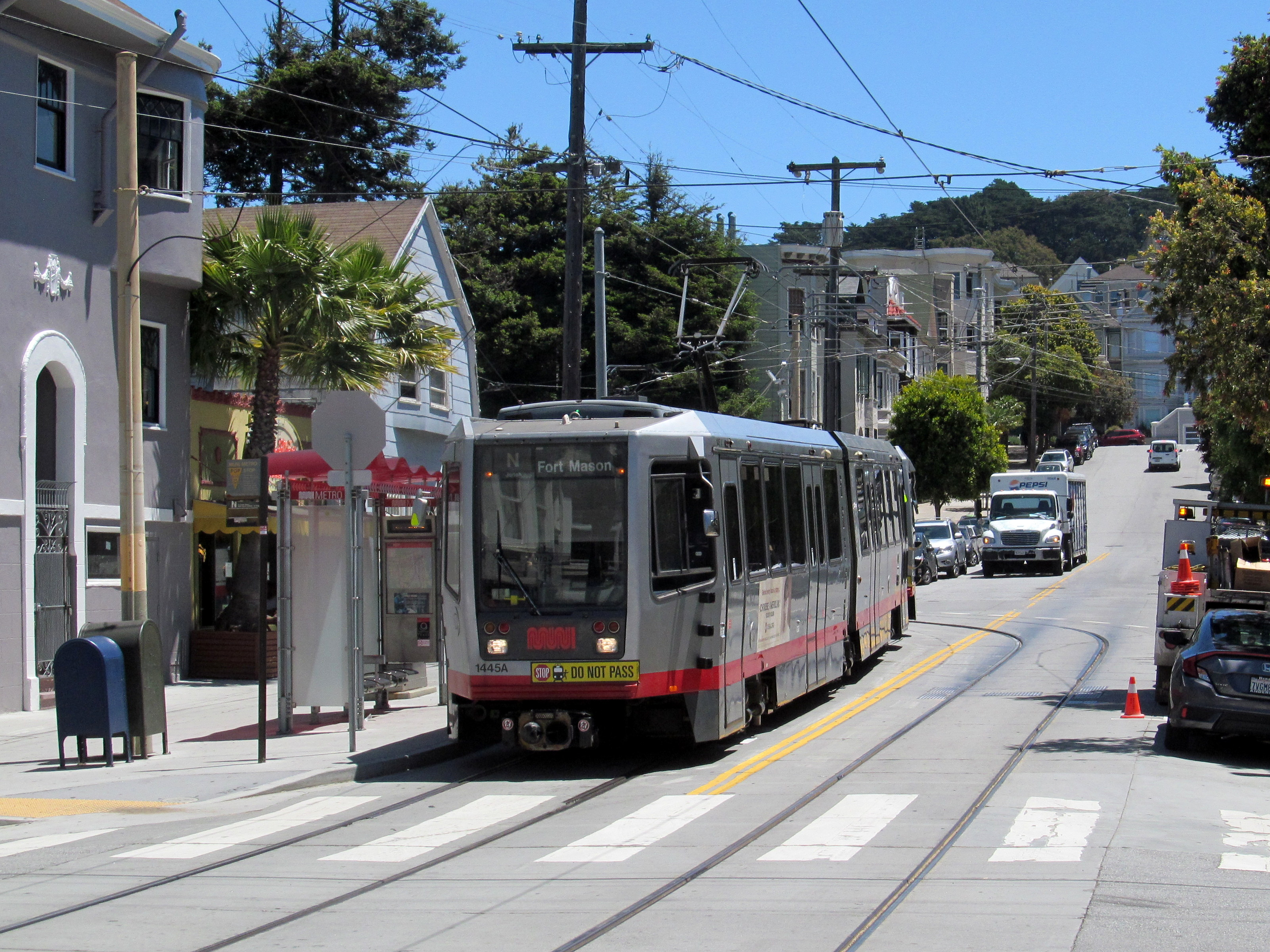
- An outbound N Judah train at Carl and Cole in 2017

General information
- Location: Carl Street at Cole Street; San Francisco, California
- Coordinates: 37°45′57″N 122°27′00″W
- Platforms: 2 side platforms
- Tracks: 2
- Connections: Muni: 37, 43

Construction
- Cycle facilities: Bay Wheels station
- Accessible: Yes

History
- Opened: October 21, 1928
- Rebuilt: 2012, 2019

Services
Preceding station	Muni	Following station
Carl and Stanyan toward Ocean Beach	N Judah	Duboce and Noe toward 4th and King
Location

Carl and Cole station is a light rail stop on the Muni Metro N Judah line, located in the Cole Valley neighborhood of San Francisco, California. The western portal of the Sunset Tunnel is located just east of the station. The station opened with the N Judah line on October 21, 1928.

The station has transit bulbs which extend the sidewalk of Carl Street, to meet trains like a side platform, allowing passengers to board or depart from trains. The stops are located just before trains cross Cole Street. Two mini-high platforms are located east of the main platforms, at the Sunset Tunnel portal which provide access to both lines for people with disabilities.

== History ==
The project which built the transit bulbs was approved in 2011 and constructed in 2012. Further streetscape improvements on the bulbs began construction as part of the Inner Sunset Streetscape Project in September 2017.

== Bus service ==
The stop is also served by bus routes 37 and 43, plus the N Bus and N Owl bus routes, which provide service along the N Judah line during the early morning and late night hours respectively when trains do not operate.
