= Carl and Stanyan station =

Light rail stop in San Francisco, California

Carl and Stanyan
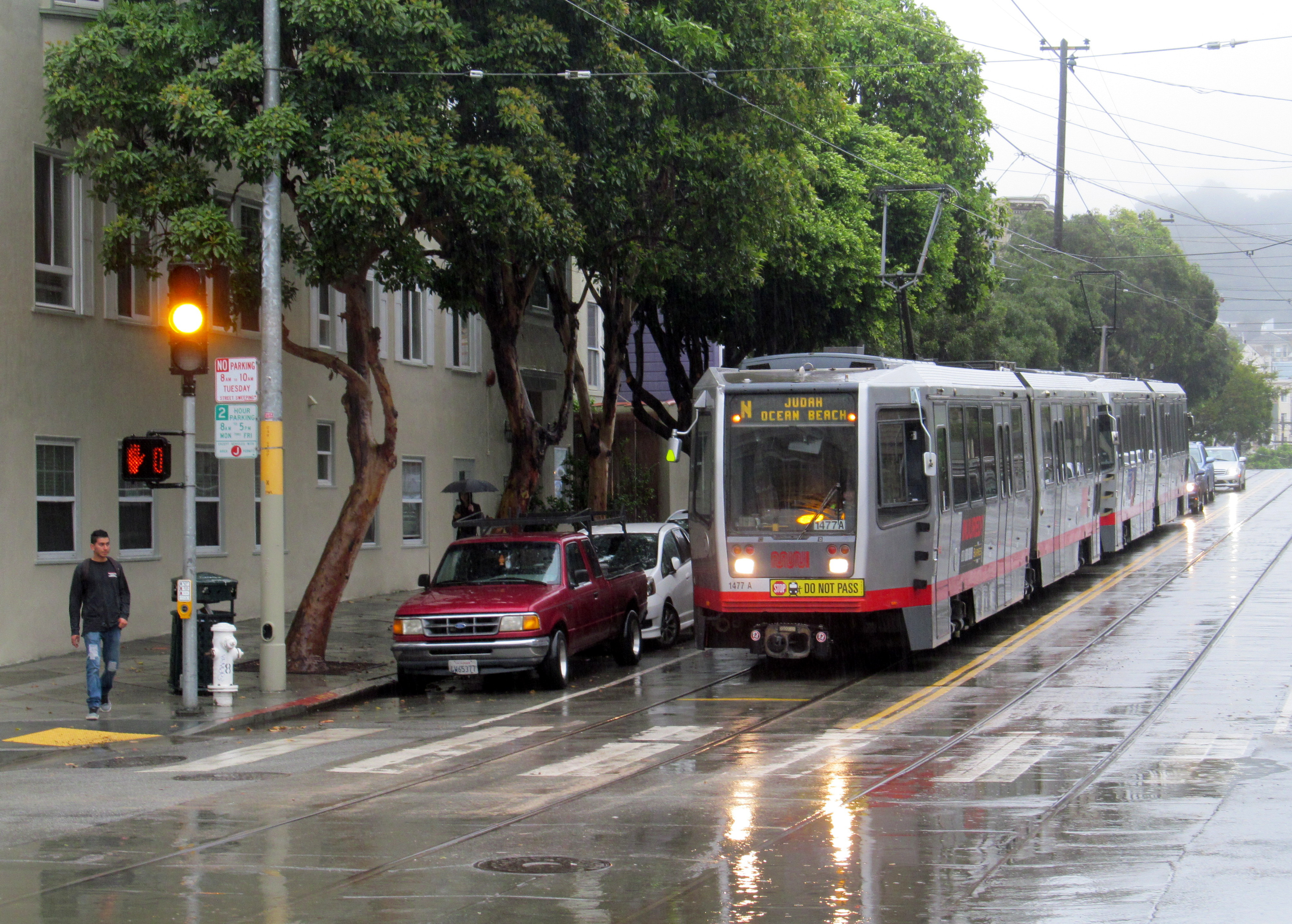
- Westbound train at Carl and Stanyan in November 2017

General information
- Location: Carl Street at Stanyan Street; San Francisco, California
- Coordinates: 37°45′56″N 122°27′10″W
- Platforms: 1 side platform (eastbound)
- Tracks: 2

Construction
- Accessible: No

History
- Opened: October 21, 1928
- Rebuilt: 2012

Services
Preceding station	Muni	Following station
Carl and Hillway toward Ocean Beach	N Judah	Carl and Cole toward 4th and King
Location

Carl and Stanyan station is a light rail stop on the Muni Metro N Judah line, located in the Cole Valley neighborhood of San Francisco, California. The station opened with the N Judah line on October 21, 1928. It is located two blocks away from Kezar Stadium. The station has a transit bulb in the eastbound direction, which extends the sidewalk of Carl Street, to meet trains like a side platform, allowing passengers to board or depart from trains. In the westbound direction, passengers wait on the sidewalk and cross a lane of traffic to board trains. The station is not accessible to people with disabilities.

The stop is also served by the N Bus and N Owl bus routes, which provide service along the N Judah line during the early morning and late night hours respectively when trains do not operate.

== Transit bulbs ==
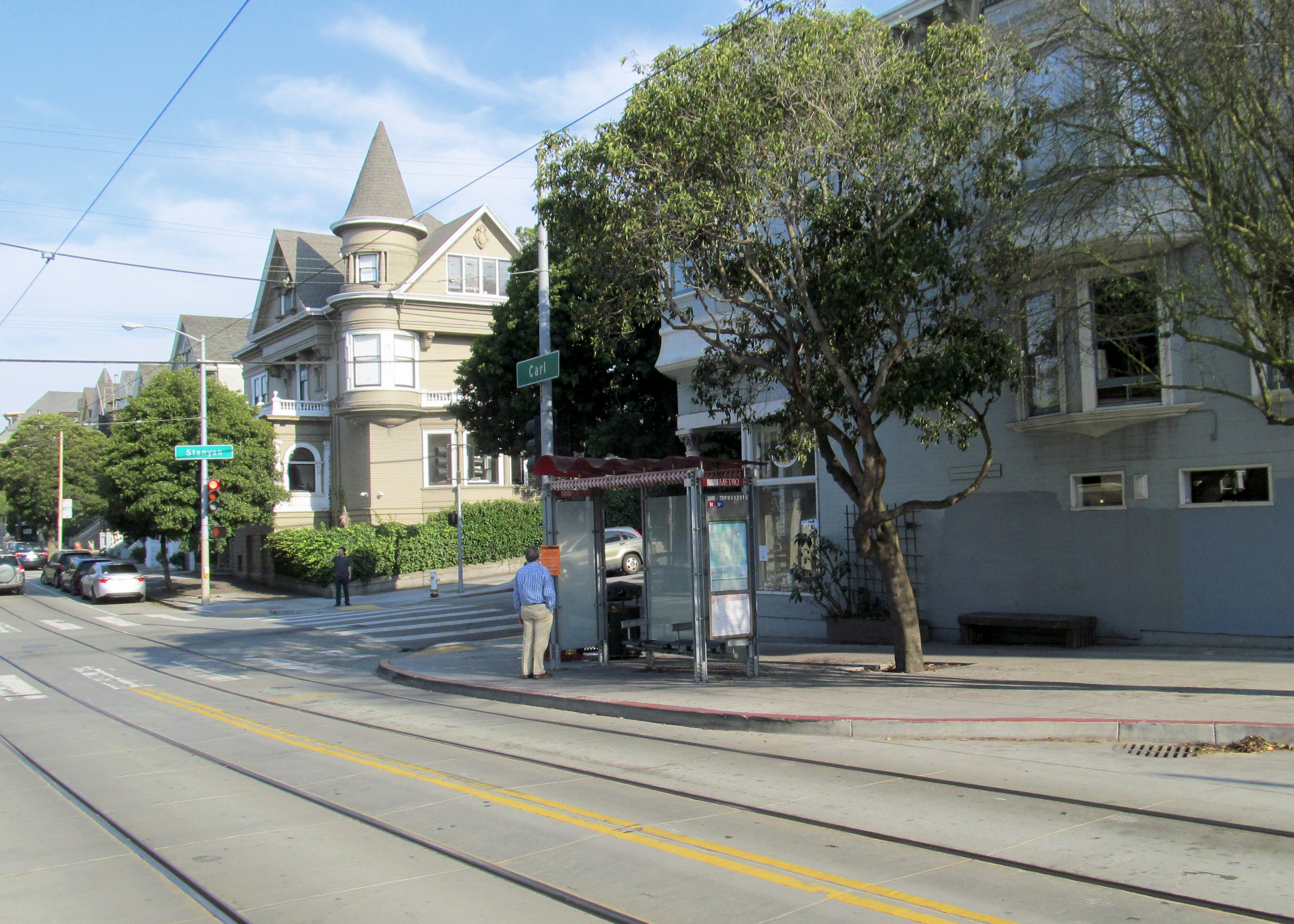
The 2012-constructed inbound boarding bulb

The N Judah line runs on Carl Street; trains stop just before crossing Stanyan Street in each direction. In 2007, the SFMTA proposed an eastbound transit bulbs at the stop (plus two at nearby Carl and Cole station) to provide a larger boarding area and prevent passengers from having to cross a traffic lane. The project was approved in 2011 and constructed in 2012. In March 2014, Muni released details of the proposed implementation of their Transit Effectiveness Project (later rebranded MuniForward). A variety of stop changes were proposed for the N Judah line, including a similar westbound bulbs at Stanyan. Two subprojects – accessible platforms at 28th Avenue, and improvements on Irving Street between 9th Avenue and Arguello – were selected for early implementation in coordination with rail replacement and seismic refitting of the Sunset Tunnel. The latter project (the Inner Sunset Streetscape Project), which also includes the new bulb at Stanyan, began construction during weekend shutdowns of the line in September 2017.
