= Duboce and Noe station =

Muni Metro light rail stop in San Francisco

Duboce and Noe
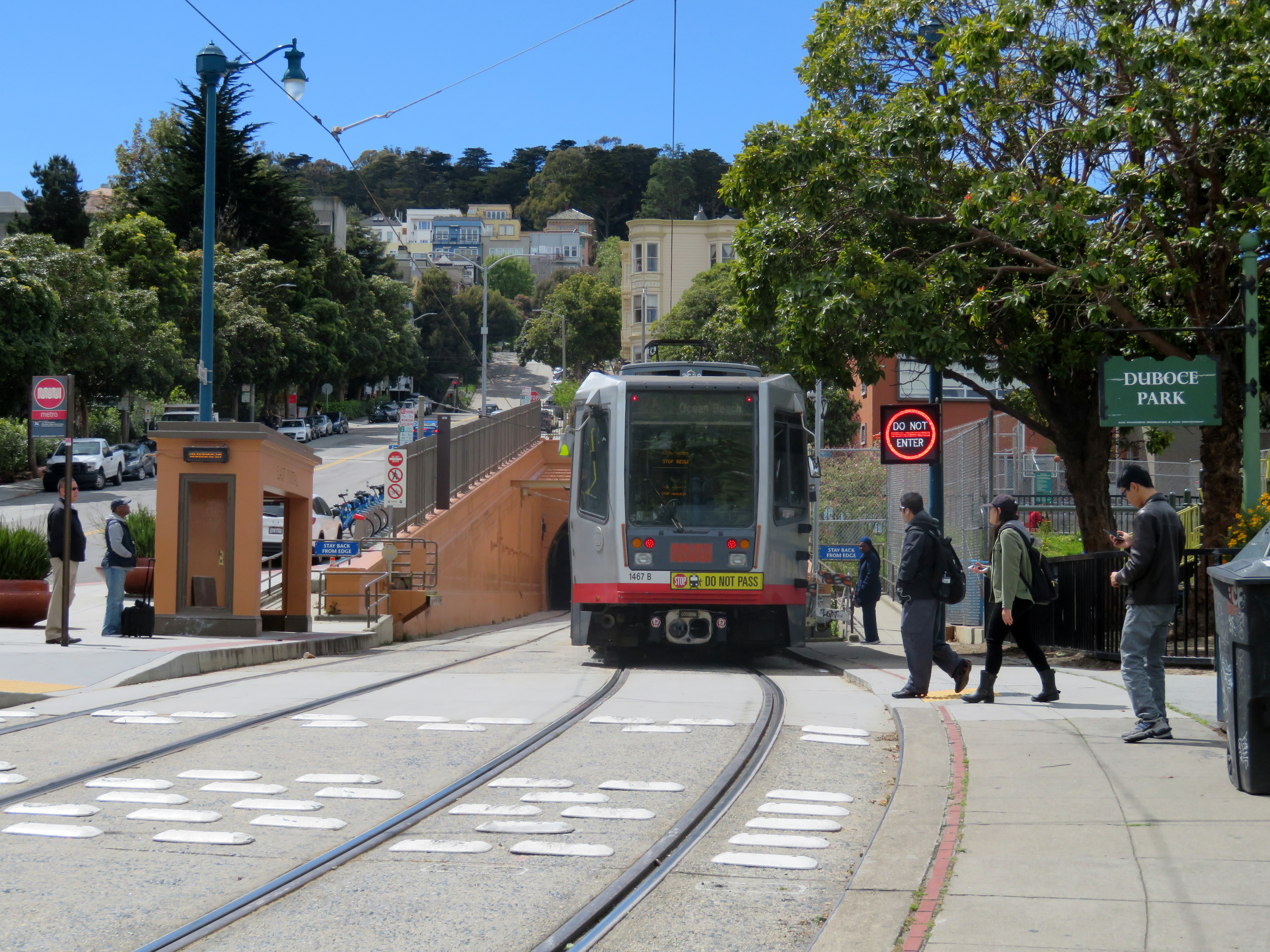
- An outbound N Judah train at Duboce and Noe in April 2018

General information
- Location: Duboce Avenue at Noe Street; San Francisco, California
- Coordinates: 37°46′09″N 122°26′01″W
- Platforms: 2 side platforms
- Tracks: 2

Construction
- Cycle facilities: Racks, Bay Wheels station
- Accessible: Yes

History
- Opened: October 21, 1928

Services
Preceding station	Muni	Following station
Carl and Cole toward Ocean Beach	N Judah	Duboce and Church toward 4th and King
Location

Duboce and Noe station (also known as Sunset Tunnel East Portal and Duboce Park) is a light rail stop on the Muni Metro N Judah line, located inside Duboce Park at the east portal of the Sunset Tunnel in San Francisco, California. The eastern portal of the Sunset Tunnel is located just west of the station. The station opened with the N Judah line on October 21, 1928.

The station has two side platforms located along the southern edge of Duboce Park with two mini-high platforms at the Sunset Tunnel portal which provide access to both lines for people with disabilities.

The stop is also served by the N Bus route which provides service along the N Judah line during the early morning when trains do not operate. Unlike all other N Judah stops and stations, the N Owl bus route does not stop at this station, instead staying on Haight Street, about two blocks away.
