= Market and 6th Street / Market and Taylor stations =

Light rail stations in San Francisco, California, U.S.

Market and 6th Street Market and Taylor
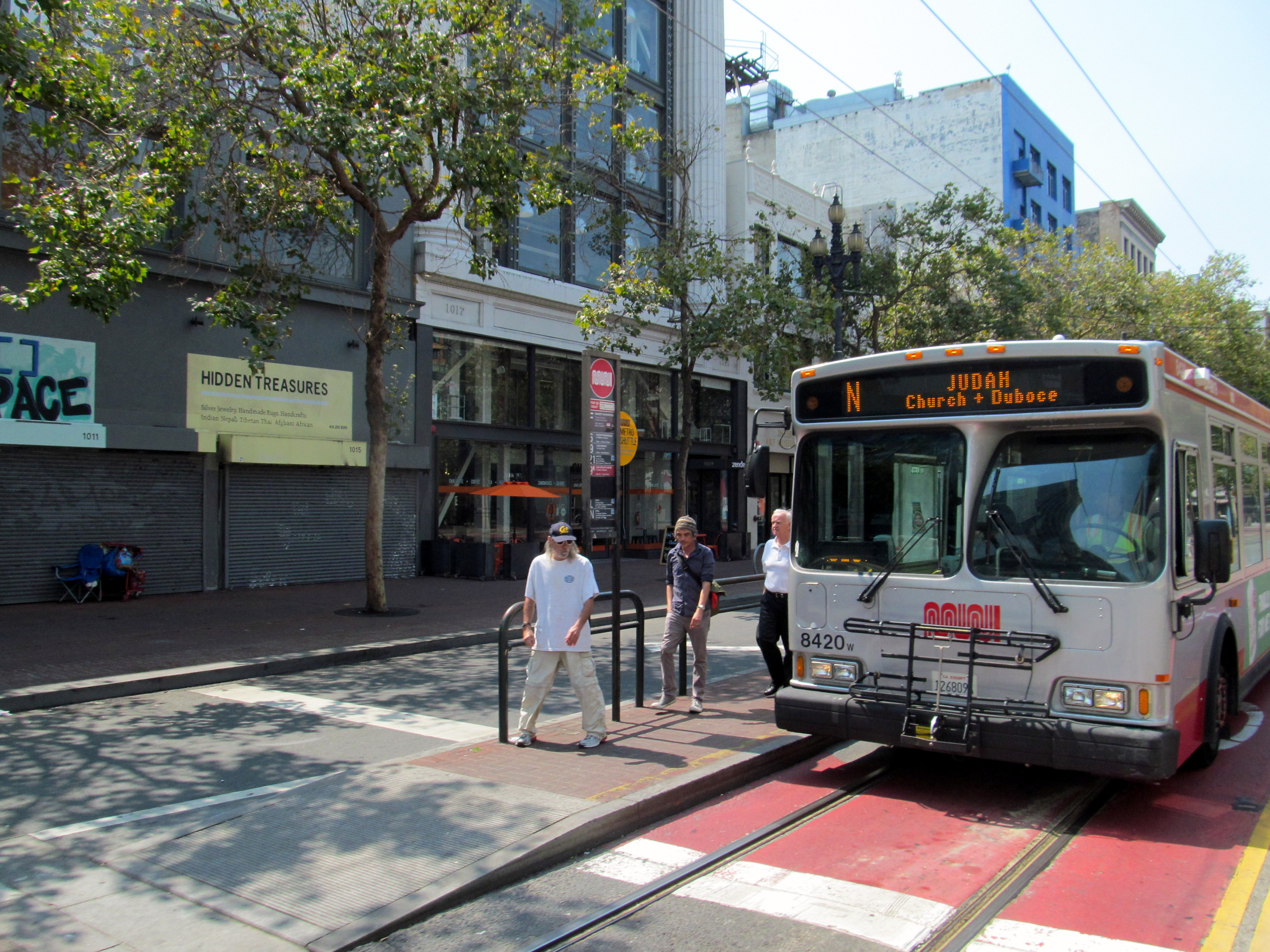
- Muni bus at Market and 6th Street station in August 2017

General information
- Location: Market Street at 6th and Taylor Streets; San Francisco, California
- Coordinates: 37°46′56″N 122°24′38″W
- Platforms: 2 side platforms
- Tracks: 2
- Connections: Muni: 6, 7, 7X, 9, 9R, L Owl, N Owl

Construction
- Accessible: No

History
- Rebuilt: September 1, 1995

Services
| Preceding station | Muni | Following station |
|---|---|---|
| Market and 7th Street toward 17th Street and Castro | F Market & Wharves | Market and 5th Street toward Jones and Beach |
Location

Market and 6th Street (eastbound) and Market and Taylor (westbound) are a pair of one-way light rail stations in San Francisco, California, United States, serving the San Francisco Municipal Railway F Market & Wharves heritage railway line. They are located on Market Street at the intersections of 6th Street and Taylor Street. The low-level platforms are also utilized by several Muni bus and trolleybus routes.

Under the planned Better Market Street project, the F stop would be discontinued to reduce travel times.
