= Powell Street station =

Rapid transit station in San Francisco, California, US

Powell
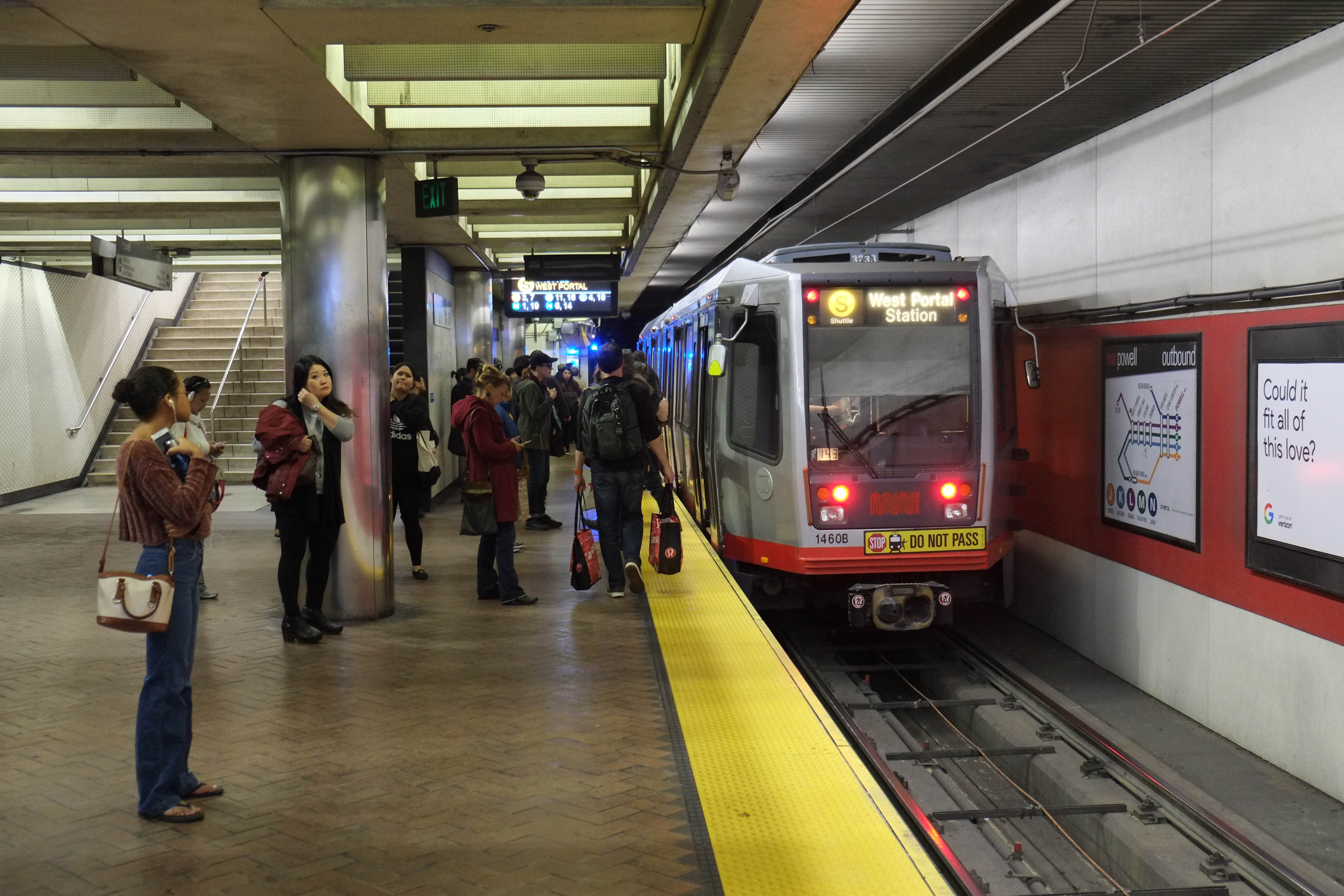
- An outbound Muni Metro train at Powell station in 2017

General information
- Location: 899 Market Street; San Francisco, California
- Coordinates: 37.784°N 122.408°W
- Owner: San Francisco Bay Area Rapid Transit District
- Lines: Market Street subway BART M-Line
- Platforms: 1 island platform (BART); 1 island platform (Muni Metro); Side platforms (Muni surface)
- Tracks: 2 wide gauge (BART); 2 standard gauge (Muni Metro); 2 standard gauge (Muni surface)
- Connections: at Union Square/Market Street; Muni, AC Transit, Golden Gate Transit, SamTrans (see § Connections); Powell–Hyde, Powell–Mason

Construction
- Structure type: Underground
- Accessible: Yes
- Architect: Skidmore, Owings & Merrill

Other information
- Station code: BART: POWL

History
- Opened: November 5, 1973 (BART); February 18, 1980 (Muni)

Passengers
- 2025: 12,925 (weekday average) (BART)
Services
Preceding station	Bay Area Rapid Transit	Following station
Civic Center toward Daly City	Blue Line	Montgomery toward Dublin/Pleasanton
Civic Center toward Daly City	Green Line	Montgomery toward Berryessa
Civic Center toward Millbrae	Red Line	Montgomery toward Richmond
Civic Center toward SFO or Millbrae	Yellow Line	Montgomery toward Antioch via Pittsburg/Bay Point
Preceding station	Muni	Following station
Civic Center toward Balboa Park	J Church	Montgomery toward Embarcadero
Civic Center toward Balboa Park	K Ingleside	Montgomery toward Embarcadero
Civic Center toward SF Zoo	L Taraval	Montgomery toward Embarcadero
Civic Center toward San Jose and Geneva (Balboa Park)	M Ocean View	Montgomery toward Embarcadero
Civic Center toward Ocean Beach	N Judah	Montgomery toward 4th and King
Civic Center toward West Portal	S Shuttle	Montgomery toward Embarcadero
At surface stops
Market and 6th Street / Market and Taylor toward 17th Street and Castro	F Market & Wharves	Market and 3rd Street / Market and Kearny toward Jones and Beach
Location

Powell Street station is a combined BART and Muni Metro rapid transit station in the Market Street subway in downtown San Francisco. Located under Market Street between 4th Street and 5th Street, and adjacent to the southern terminus of Powell Street, it serves the Financial District neighborhood and surrounding areas. The three-level station has a large fare mezzanine level, with separate platform levels for Muni Metro and BART below. The station is served by the BART Red, Yellow, Green, and Blue lines, and the Muni Metro J Church, K Ingleside, L Taraval, M Ocean View, N Judah, and S Shuttle lines.

The fare mezzanine also connects to the Union Square/Market Street station. The Powell-Mason and Powell-Hyde cable car lines turn around at Powell and Market adjacent to the station and Hallidie Plaza. BART service at the station began on November 5, 1973, followed by Muni Metro service on February 18, 1980.

== Station layout ==
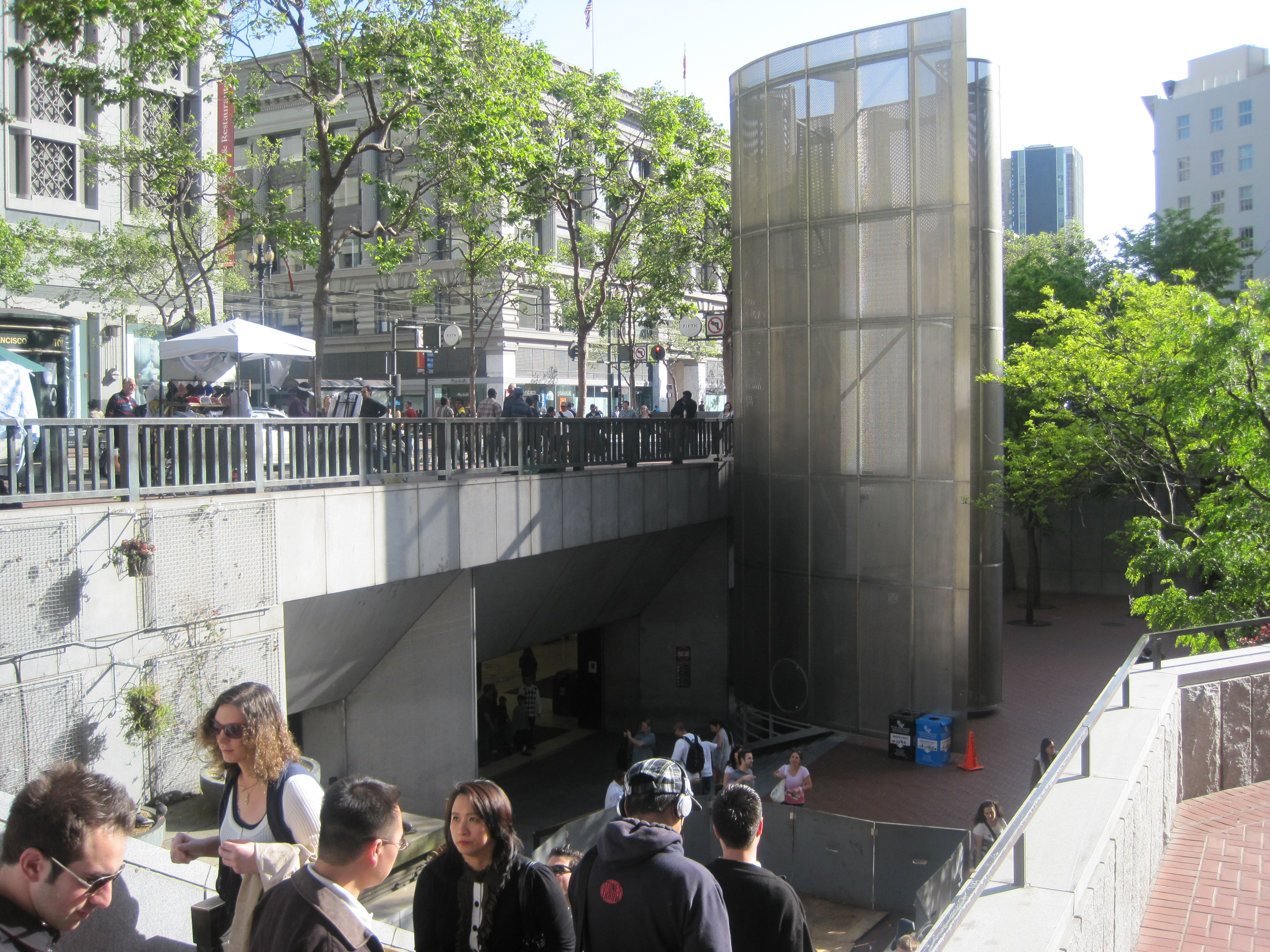
Hallidie Plaza entrance to the station

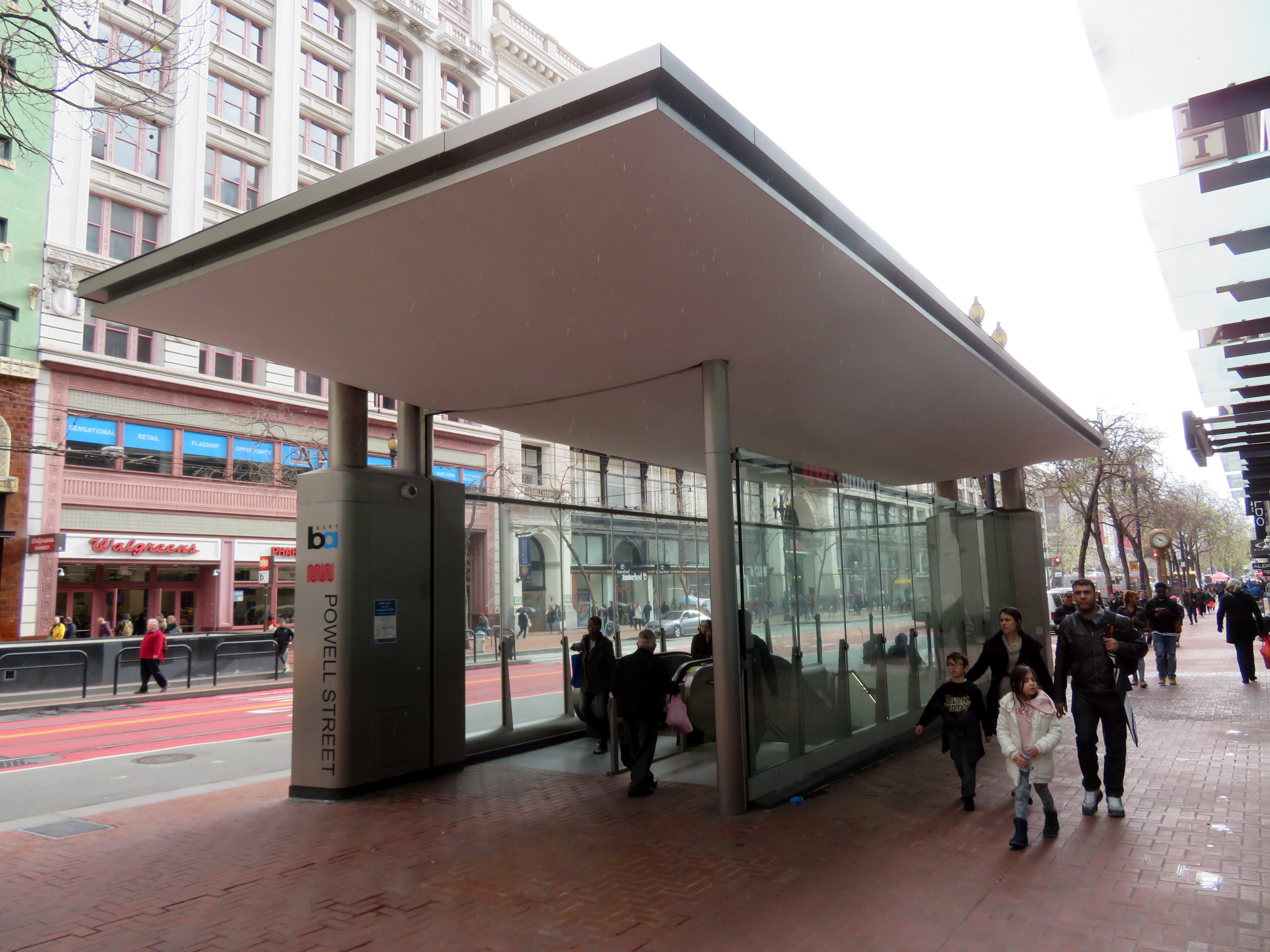
The new canopy in March 2019

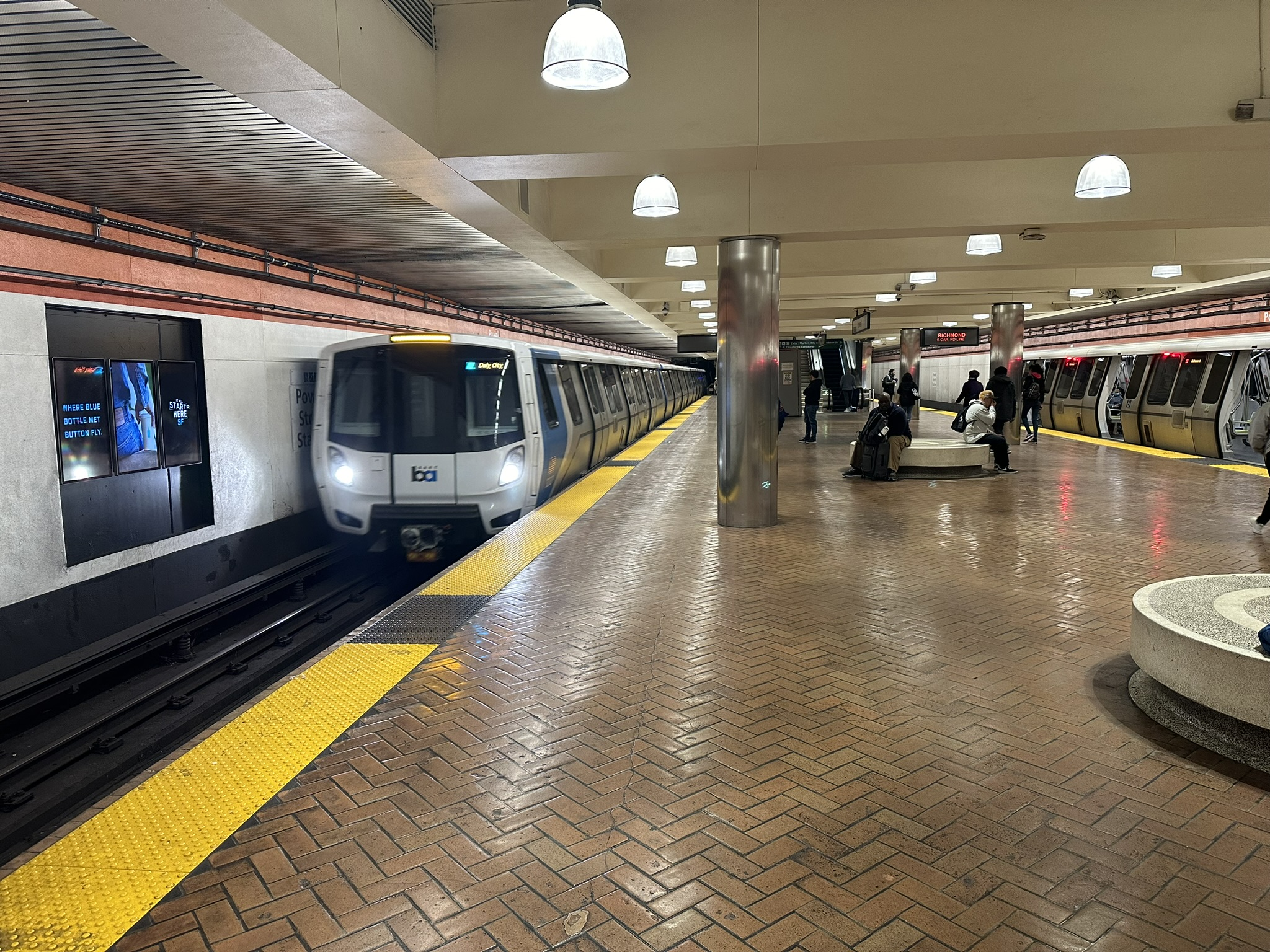
BART trains at the station in December 2023

Like the three other shared Muni/BART stations in the Market Street subway, Powell has three underground levels. The first level is a fare mezzanine, with two Muni paid areas and two BART paid areas. The second level has a single island platform for Muni Metro, and the third level has an island platform for BART. The station has eight street entrances along its length. It formerly had two underground entrances to the fare mezzanine from the concourse level of the San Francisco Centre mall, which paid BART about $750,000 per year for the entrances. A closed passageway leads from the northeast end of the station under Market Street partway to Third Street; this was planned to be a direct entrance from the Yerba Buena Center development, but was never completed. Powell and nearby Montgomery, both designed by Skidmore, Owings & Merrill, have similar designs – including distinctive domed hexagonal "bubble tiles" on the mezzanine level.

The Central Subway passes under the Powell station complex at Stockton and Fourth streets, with Union Square/Market Street station located north of Powell station under Stockton Street. The stations are connected outside of Muni fare control by a passageway. The existing Stockton/Ellis entrance to Powell Street station was closed for a planned five years on April 24, 2013, so that it could be modified to include the connection to the new station. The closure was originally planned for the previous August, but delayed after Muni determined it was not yet needed. Muni purchased the entrance from BART for one dollar. Central Subway service began on November 19, 2022, with the Ellis entrance reopened.

Following the 2015 addition of a canopy over an escalator at 19th Street Oakland station, which reduced escalator downtime by one-third, BART decided to add canopies to all downtown Oakland and San Francisco entrances. The canopies protect the escalator from weather damage, improve lighting, allow the escalator to be fully closed off when the station is not open, and provide a location for real-time train arrival information displays. The Powell station entrance at Market and Ellis was chosen for early implementation; it was closed on November 6, 2017, with the new canopy opened on September 29, 2018. Construction of the Market Street entrances will begin in 2020, with completion in 2027. The southern entrance of 5th Street was closed on January 10, 2022, for canopy construction. That entrance was completed on April 24, 2023, with the 4th Street entrance closed for construction at that time. The 5th Street entrance was closed on November 22, 2024, with completion expected by mid-2025. The canopies at Powell station include artwork entitled "Your Turn" by Aaron De La Cruz.

In September 2015, BART released a report on possible modernization of the station. A total of $93 million in potential improvements were identified, including escalator replacement and canopy construction ($25 million), a corridor to Cyril Magnin ($13.7 million), a new mid-station elevator ($6.1 million), platform screen doors ($6 million), additional platform stairs ($5.6 million), and numerous other projects. Bathrooms in underground BART stations were closed due to security concerns after the 9/11 attacks. In 2019, BART indicated plans to open a new bathroom with an attendant at Powell in 2021. In November 2019, the board issued an $11 million contract for improvements at Powell, with the bathroom expected to cost an additional $20 million. The new bathrooms opened on February 2, 2022. The renovation was completed in November 2022. It included a ceiling artwork titled Elysium, which depicts an illuminated view of the buildings above the station.

After a test at Castro, colored lights were installed on escalators at Muni Metro stations in 2018–19. Those at Powell are yellow and burgundy, reflecting the colors of the cable cars. The entrances on the southern side of the station were closed on April 13, 2020, due to low ridership during the COVID-19 pandemic. The center entrance reopened on May 15, 2021, with the remaining entrances reopened on June 12. Thirteen BART stations, including Powell, did not originally have faregates for passengers using the elevator. In 2020, BART started a project to add faregates to elevators at these stations. The new faregate on the BART platform at Powell was installed in April 2023. Installation of second-generation BART faregates took place from November 4–23, 2024.

Pigeons living in the station are a nuisance, which has prompted BART to take countermeasures such as installing nets and metal screens to block their nesting spots. The pigeons are attracted by passengers littering and by nearby street food vendors.

== Connections ==
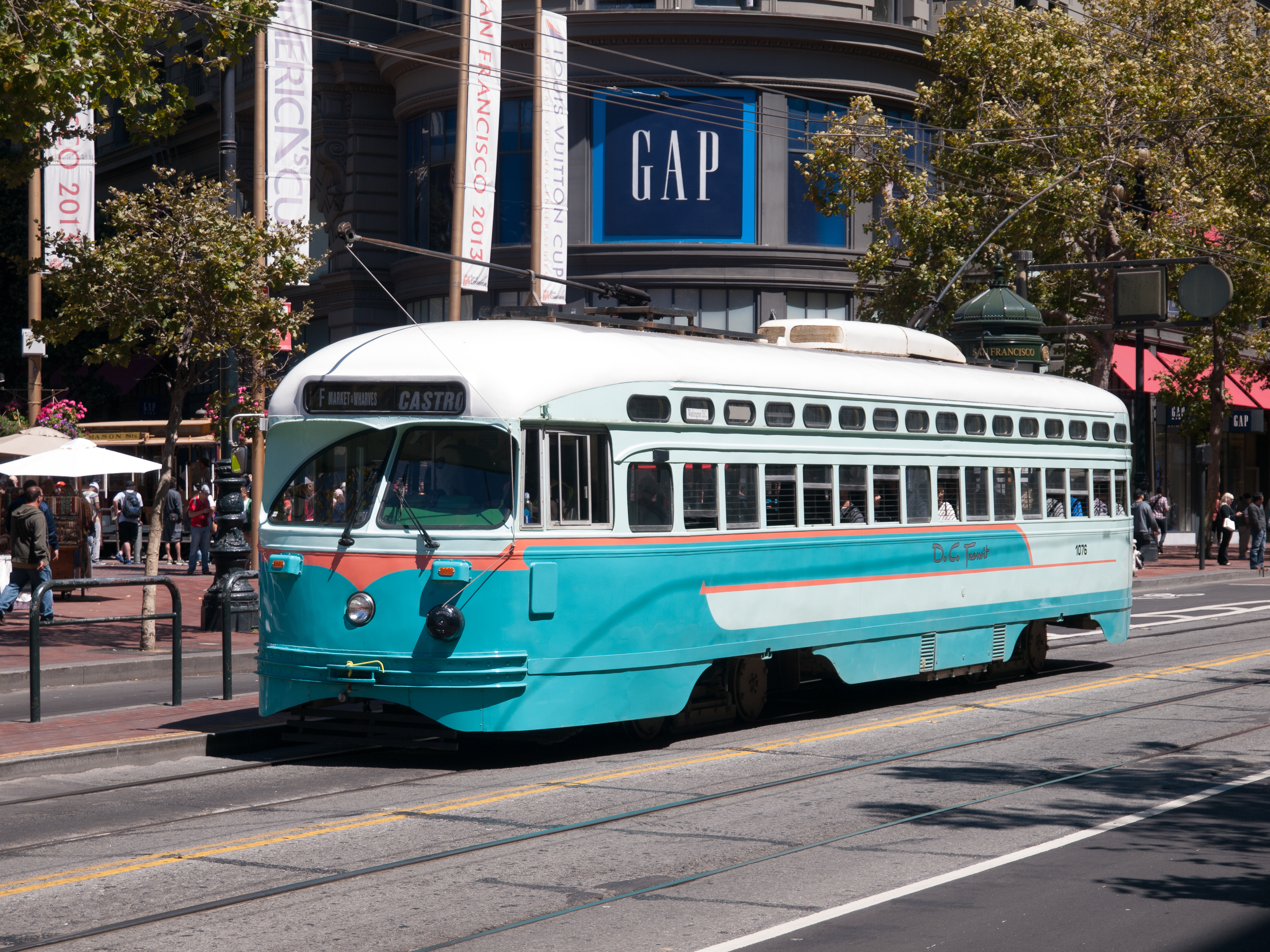
F Market and Wharves streetcar at Market and 5th Street

Two Muni heritage streetcar stops are located above Powell Street station: Market and 4th Street (inbound) / Market and Stockton (outbound), and Market and 5th Street. Both are served by the F Market & Wharves line. The Powell and Market turntable of the San Francisco cable car system, terminus of the Powell/Hyde and Powell/Mason lines, is located adjacent to the station next to Haladie Plaza. The station is also served by a number of Muni bus and trolleybus routes:

- Local: 5, 6, 7, 8, 9, 15, 21, 27, 30, 31, 45
- Rapid: 5R, 9R
- Express: 7X, 8AX, 8BX, 81X
- Owl service: 91 Owl, J Bus, K Bus, K Owl, L Bus, L Owl, M Bus, N Owl, N Bus

AC Transit serves Powell Street station with the 800 All Nighter route during hours that BART is not operating.

Additional Muni (14, 14R, 14X, 714), Golden Gate Transit (30, 70, 101, 101X), and SamTrans (FCX, 292, 397, 398) bus routes run on Mission Street, one block away.

Under the planned Better Market Street project, F stops would be consolidated to reduce travel times. The inbound stop at 5th Street and both stops at 4th Street would be discontinued, with a new inbound stop midway between 4th and 5th.
