= Civic Center/UN Plaza station =

Rapid transit station in San Francisco, California, US

Civic Center
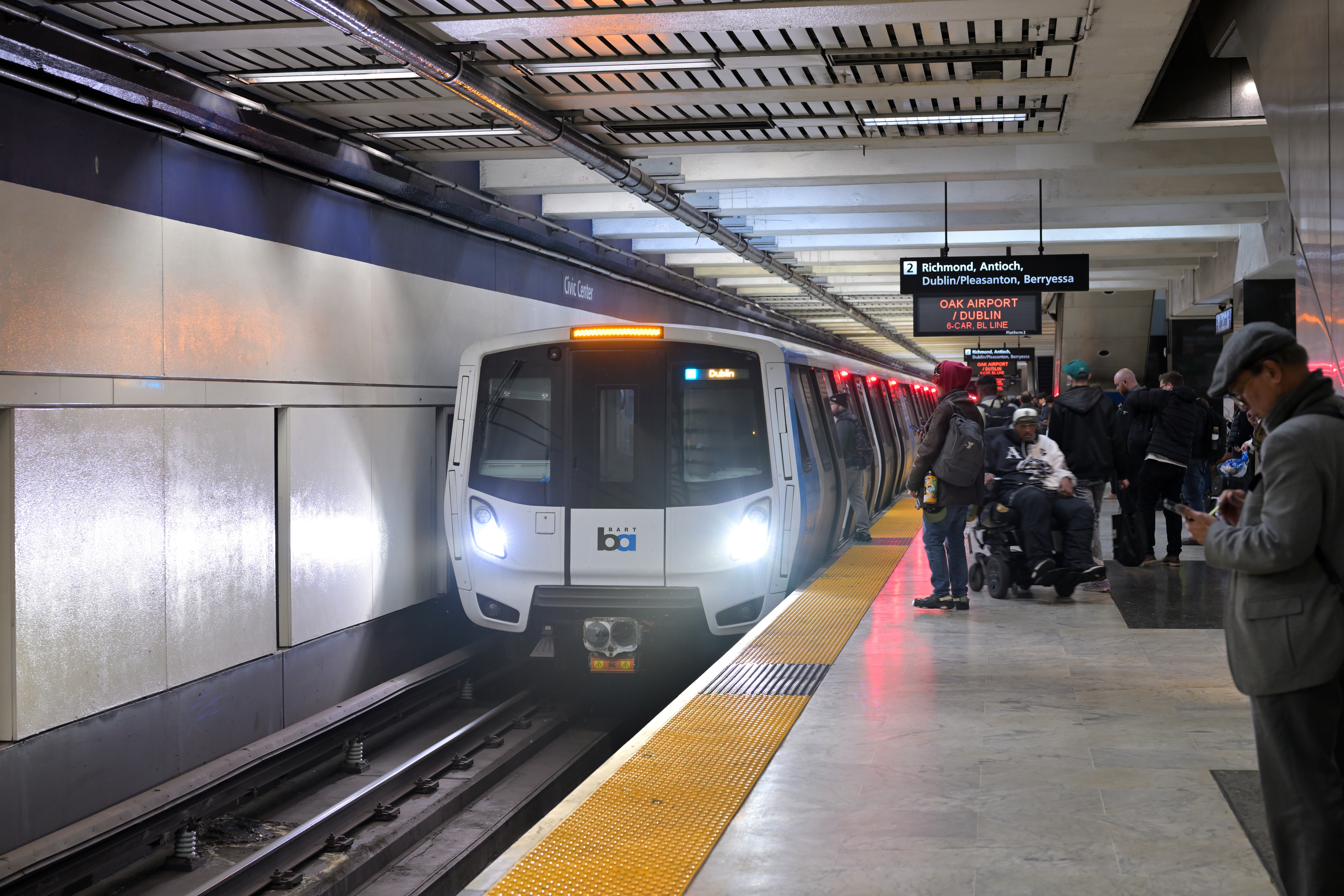
- A BART train at the station in 2026

General information
- Location: 1150 Market Street; San Francisco, California
- Coordinates: 37.779861°N 122.413498°W
- Owner: San Francisco Bay Area Rapid Transit District
- Lines: Market Street subway BART M-Line
- Platforms: 1 island platform (BART); 1 island platform (Muni Metro); Side platforms (Muni surface)
- Tracks: 2 wide gauge (BART); 2 standard gauge (Muni Metro); 2 standard gauge (Muni surface)
- Connections: Muni, AC Transit, Golden Gate Transit, SamTrans

Construction
- Structure type: Underground
- Accessible: Yes
- Architect: Reid & Tarics Associates

Other information
- Station code: BART: CIVC

History
- Opened: November 5, 1973 (BART); February 18, 1980 (Muni)

Passengers
- 2025: 11,378 (weekday average) (BART)
Services
Preceding station	Bay Area Rapid Transit	Following station
16th Street Mission toward Daly City	Blue Line	Powell toward Dublin/Pleasanton
16th Street Mission toward Daly City	Green Line	Powell toward Berryessa
16th Street Mission toward Millbrae	Red Line	Powell toward Richmond
16th Street Mission toward SFO or Millbrae	Yellow Line	Powell toward Antioch via Pittsburg/Bay Point
Preceding station	Muni	Following station
Van Ness toward Balboa Park	J Church	Powell toward Embarcadero
Van Ness toward Balboa Park	K Ingleside	Powell toward Embarcadero
Van Ness toward SF Zoo	L Taraval	Powell toward Embarcadero
Van Ness toward San Jose and Geneva (Balboa Park)	M Ocean View	Powell toward Embarcadero
Van Ness toward Ocean Beach	N Judah	Powell toward 4th and King
Van Ness toward West Portal	S Shuttle	Powell toward Embarcadero
At surface stops
Market and 9th Street / Market and Larkin toward 17th Street and Castro	F Market & Wharves	Market and 6th Street / Market and Taylor toward Jones and Beach
Location

Civic Center/UN Plaza station (often Civic Center station) is a combined BART and Muni Metro rapid transit station in the Market Street subway in downtown San Francisco. Located under Market Street between 7th Street and 8th Street, it is named for the Civic Center neighborhood and the adjacent United Nations Plaza. The three-level station has a large fare mezzanine level, with separate platform levels for Muni Metro and BART below.

The station is served by the BART Red, Yellow, Green, and Blue lines, and the Muni Metro J Church, K Ingleside, L Taraval, M Ocean View, N Judah, and S Shuttle lines.

== Station layout ==
Like the three other shared Muni/BART stations in the Market Street subway, Civic Center has three underground levels. The first level is a fare mezzanine, with two Muni paid areas and two BART paid areas. The second level has a single island platform for Muni Metro, and the third level has an island platform for BART. The station has six street entrances along its length, including one entrance in UN Plaza. The surface elevator is near the center of the station; the platform elevator is at the northeast end.

== History ==
The BART Board approved the name "Civic Center" in December 1965. BART service at the station began on November 5, 1973, followed by Muni Metro service on February 18, 1980. In 2005, the station name was changed to Civic Center/UN Plaza during celebrations for the 60th anniversary of the United Nations and World Environment Day. The name change was proposed by then-San Francisco mayor Gavin Newsom; it was initially rejected by the BART board but later accepted. Additional fare gates to allow direct connections between Muni and BART (without having to go up to the fare mezzanine) were also proposed. Construction of a bike station on the mezzanine level began in December 2014; it opened in August 2015.

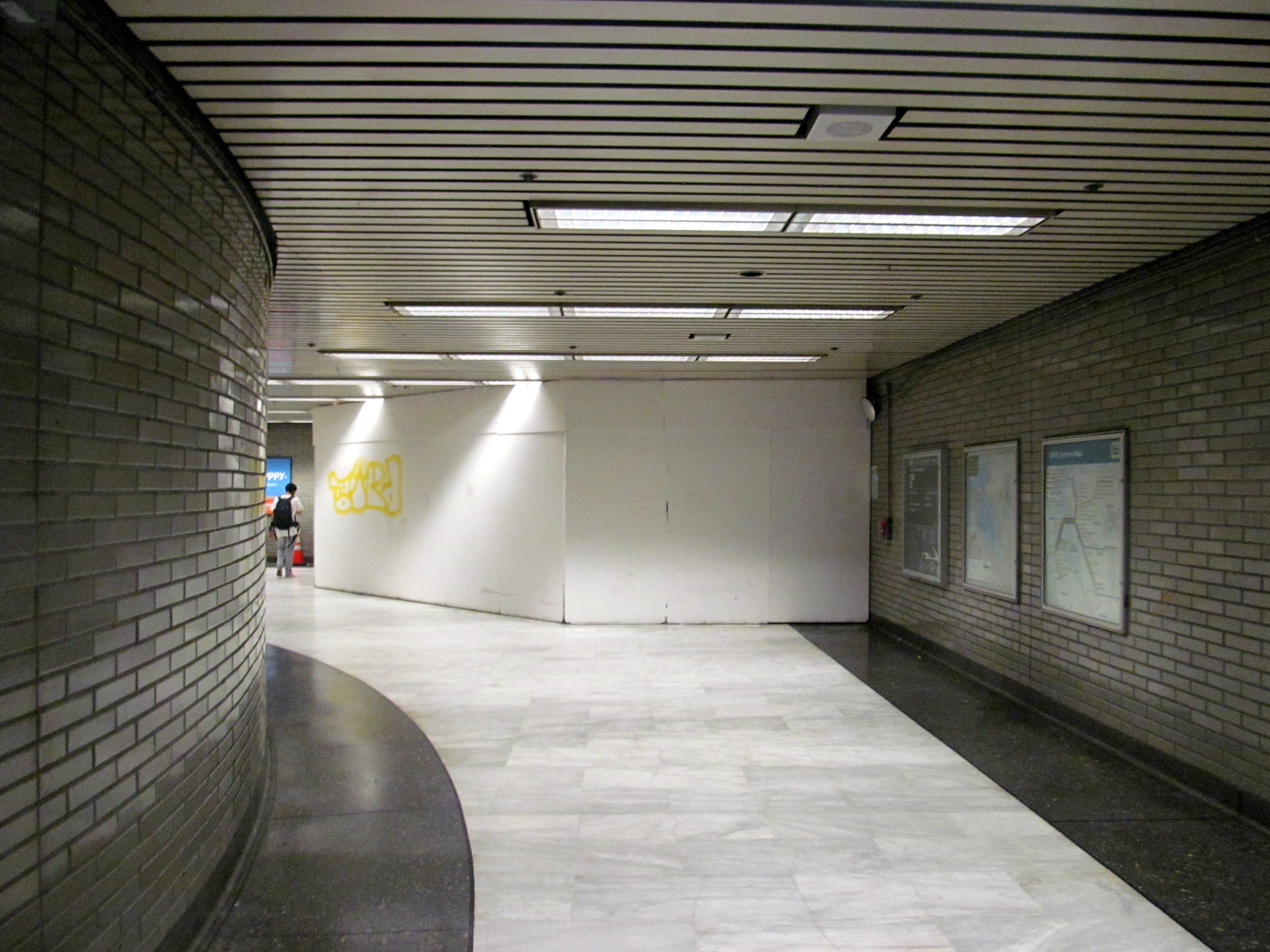
The closed-off entrance in 2017

A passageway formerly led to two additional entrances west of 8th Street and Hyde Street. One – on the north side of Market Street at Grove Street – was temporarily closed in December 2016 after a sewer pipe collapsed under the escalators. The entrance remained closed until it was permanently removed in October 2017. The remaining entrance west of 8th Street was permanently closed on November 1, 2018, as the passageway space was needed for a new electrical substation to add redundancy and capacity to support increased Transbay Tube train frequency. The six original entrances (all of which are significantly closer to the faregates) remained open. The substation ultimately began use in 2026.

Following the 2015 addition of a canopy over an escalator at 19th Street Oakland station, which reduced escalator downtime by one-third, BART decided to add canopies to all downtown Oakland and San Francisco entrances. The canopies will protect the escalator from weather damage, improve lighting, allow the escalator to be fully closed off when the station is not open, and provide a location for real-time train arrival information displays. The Civic Center station entrance at Market and 7th was chosen for early implementation; it was closed on December 11, 2017, with the new canopy opened on October 9, 2018. The southern entrance at Market and 8th was closed on May 9, 2022, for canopy installation, and reopened on April 28, 2023. The 7th Street north entrance closed for canopy construction on April 29, 2024. All canopies are planned to be complete by 2027. The canopies at Civic Center station include artwork entitled "Dragonfly Wing" by Ron M. Saunders.

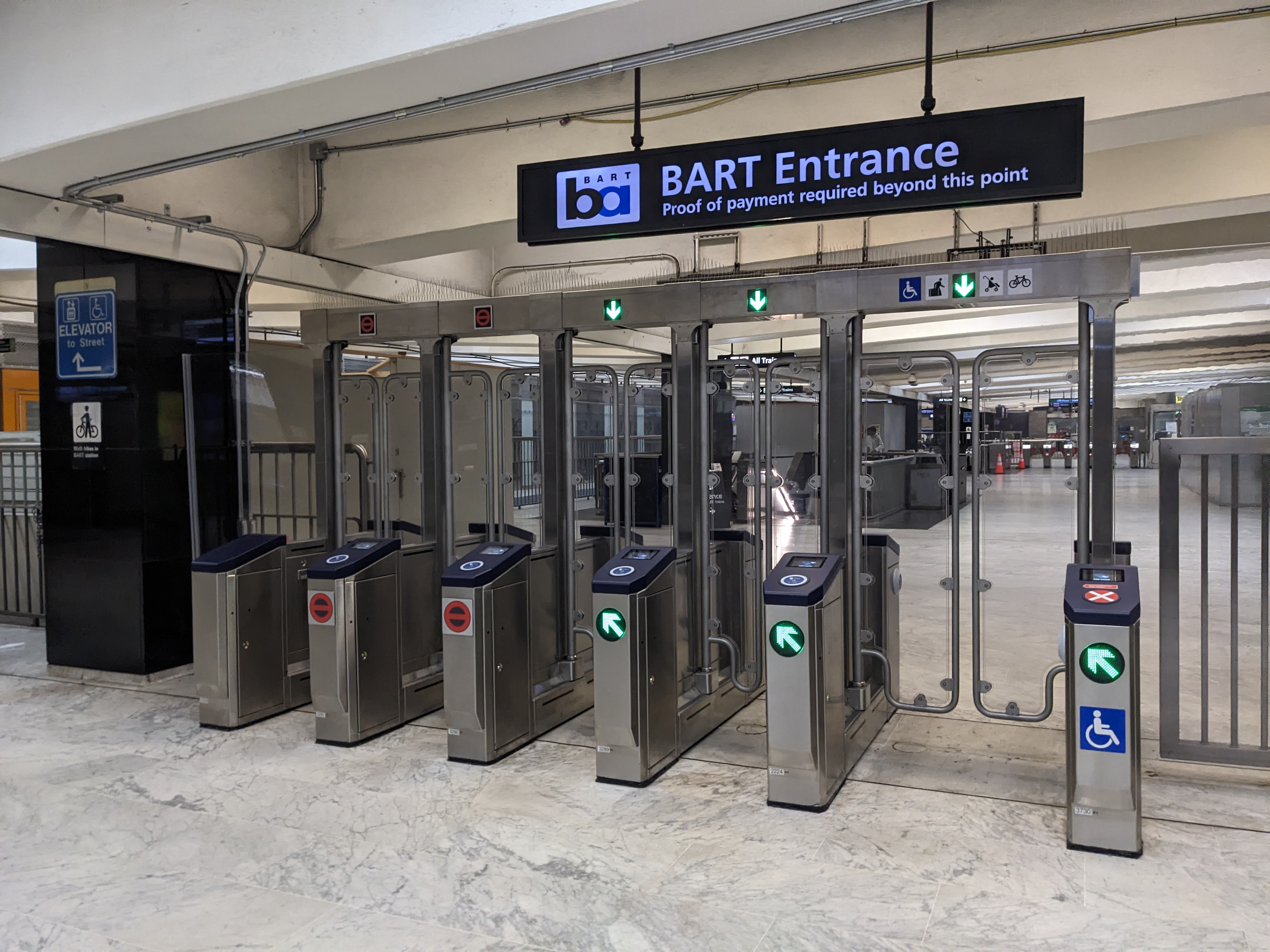
New fare gates in August 2024

In May 2018, BART proposed to close off a corridor that connects the 7th Street and 8th Street sides of the station because it was frequently used for drug use. In February 2020, BART began a project to add two additional staircases to the BART platform. Construction was expected to take 12 months. The entrances on the southern side of the station were closed from April 13, 2020, to June 12, 2021, due to low ridership during the COVID-19 pandemic.

Thirteen BART stations, including Civic Center, did not originally have faregates for passengers using the elevator. In 2020, BART started a project to add faregates to elevators at these stations. The new faregate at Civic Center was installed in January 2023. BART reopened a secondary station agent booth – which had been closed for over a decade – near the Civic Center entrance in February 2023. Replacement of the original BART fare gates with new units took place from July 18 to August 29, 2024.

== Connections ==
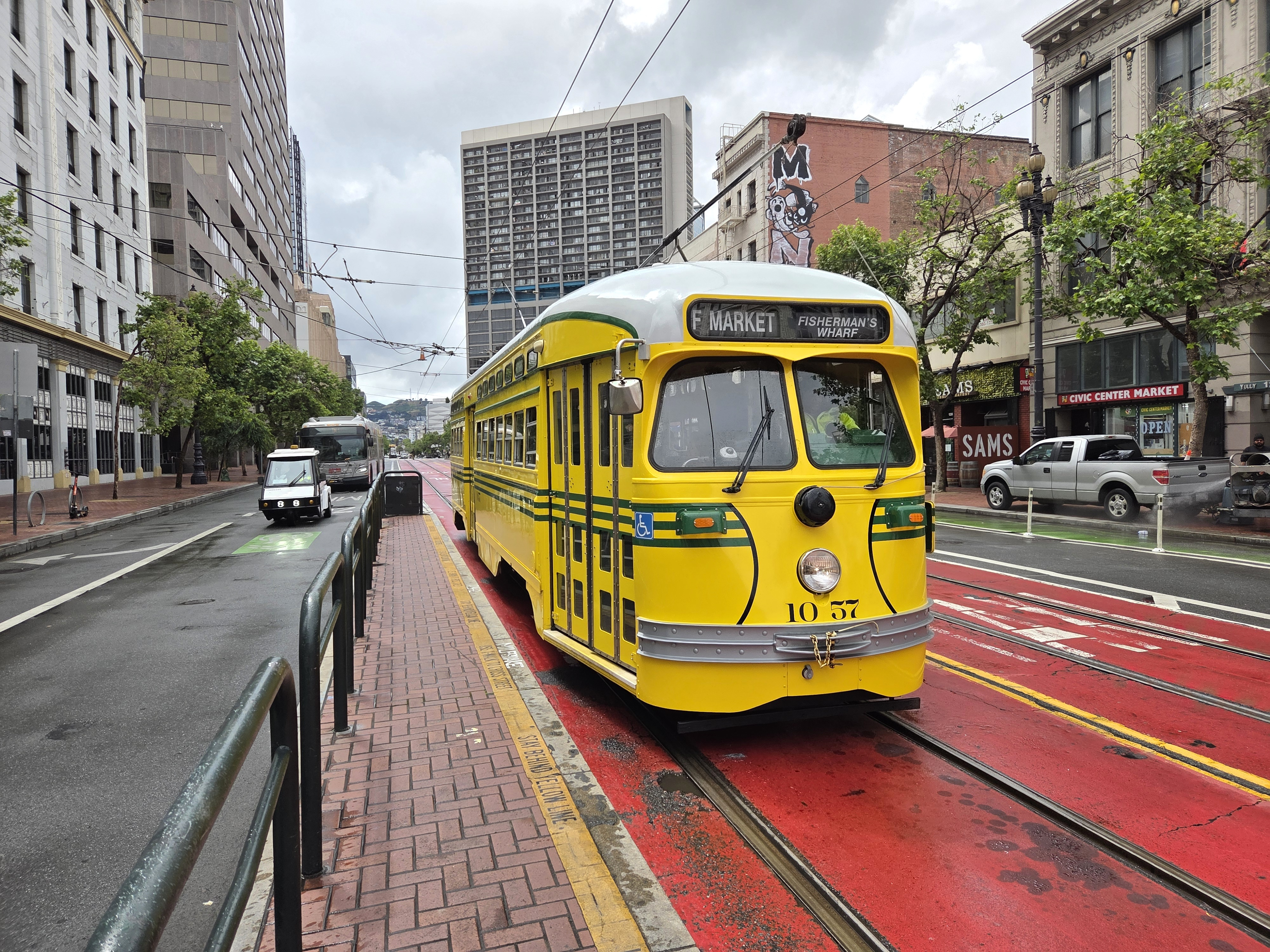
F Market & Wharves streetcar at 8th Street

Two Muni heritage streetcar stops are located above the station: Market and 7th Street, and Market and 8th Street (inbound) / Market and Hyde (outbound). Both are served by the F Market and Wharves line. The station is also served by a number of Muni bus and trolleybus routes:

- Local: 5, 6, 7, 9, 19, 21
- Rapid: 5R, 9R
- Express: 83X
- Owl service: J Bus, K Bus, K Owl, L Bus, L Owl, M Bus, N Owl, and N Bus

Several Golden Gate Transit routes (24C, 30, 54C, 70, 92, 101, 101X) stop on 7th Street adjacent to the station. Additional Muni (14, 14R, 14X, 714) and SamTrans (FCXX, 292, 397, 398) bus routes run on Mission Street, one block away. AC Transit serves Civic Center station with the 800 All Nighter route during hours that BART is not operating.

Under the planned Better Market Street project, stops on the F Market and Wharves line and bus routes would be consolidated to reduce travel times. The F stops at 7th and 8th streets would be replaced by a single midblock stop.
