= Charles W. Jones (medievalist) =

American historian

Charles W. Jones (1905–1989) was a medievalist scholar who served on the faculties of Cornell University and the University of California, Berkeley. He is noted for his work on Bede, the development of the ecclesiastical calendar, medieval hagiography, and Carolingian aesthetics. At his death a major work titled The Age of the Book: Christian Foundations of Western Literature was left unfinished.

Jones contributed to the third volume of the monumental The Plan of St. Gall (1979) by Walter Horn and Ernest Born, translating the 9th-century Latin text "Customs of Corbie" (Consuetudines Corbienses) of Adalhard, and two other documents. The Consuetudines consist of Adalhard's managerial directives to the heads of the departments in his monastery. They are significant for outlining in prose the objectives illustrated graphically by the architectural drawing that is the subject of the book. The difficulty of the translation is indicated by the number of footnotes, which occupy twice as much space as the text itself. Horn and Born noted that Jones "accomplished this gruesome task without the slightest loss of enthusiasm!"

Jones is best known outside scholarly circles for his work on the legend of Saint Nicholas and the Santa Claus tradition, having written the article "Knickerbocker Santa Claus" (1954), the monograph The Saint Nicholas Liturgy and its Literary Relationships (1963), and the book Saint Nicholas of Myra, Bari, and Manhattan (1978).

== Sources ==
- University of California (System) Academic Senate, "Charles W. Jones, English: Berkeley," Calisphere.
