= Esther Born =

American architect and photographer

- Born: Esther Frances Baum; May 31, 1902; Palo Alto, California, US
- Died: May 2, 1987 (aged 84); San Diego, California, US
- Education: University of California, Berkeley
- Known for: Architecture, Photography
- Spouse: Ernest Born (m. 1926)

Esther Frances Born (née Baum; May 31, 1902 – May 2, 1987) was an American architect, author and architectural photographer who lived and worked in the San Francisco Bay Area, New York, and Mexico. With her husband, Ernest Born, she wrote The New Architecture in Mexico, which also includes an article on the painting and sculpture by Justino Fernández. She traveled in Mexico for 10 months, photographing and drawing historic and modern buildings, ultimately attracting global attention to the dawn of Mexico's modern architecture. Working mostly behind the scenes, she was integral to the success of the Ernest Born architecture firm.

== Early life and education ==
Esther Frances Baum was born in 1902 in Palo Alto, California, as the oldest of three daughters of Frank A. Baum, an electrical engineer and inventor, and his wife, Mary, nee Dawson. She grew up in Piedmont and graduated from Oakland Technical High School in 1920. She studied architecture at the University of California, Berkeley under John Galen Howard, earning a bachelor's degree in 1924. As recommended by Professor Howard for all his students, she stayed on for graduate studies. She also worked for architect Henry H. Gutterson until she traveled for a year in Europe to study languages and history of art. In 1926 she married architect Ernest Born.

== Career ==
After their marriage, the Borns traveled and studied in France and Italy before they settled in New York. From 1929 to 1936 they both worked in various architectural offices and established their own studio with associate Carl Bertil Lund, who continued to work with them for more than forty years. One of their first projects was the New York Offices and Tasting Room for wine importers Bates & Schoonmaker, which was published in Architectural Forum and Architectural Review. Ernest was credited as the architect; Esther as the photographer. In early 1933, Esther Born took an intensive course in architectural photography with photographer Ben Rabinovitch and later showed her work in a group exhibition and solo shows at the Rabinovitch Gallery. She also took graduate classes in architecture at Columbia University.

Through the friendship with their neighbors, Frida Kahlo and Diego Rivera, the Borns became interested in Mexico. Born traveled to Mexico to photography modernist architecture between 1935 and 1936 and this portion of her archive is held at the Center for Creative Photography, University of Arizona, Tucson, Arizona. Esther photographed historic and modern architecture, landscapes and people, and Ernest assisted her with the collection of data and the layout. Her article The New Architecture in Mexico was published in the Architectural Record as well as in book form by W. Morrow and Company. The book contained architectural photos, essays, an article on the painting and sculpture by Justino Fernández, and portraits of Mexican architects Juan O'Gorman and José Villagrán García. In later years, she photographed Frank Lloyd Wright and Bernard Maybeck.

Back in San Francisco, the Borns established their architecture and design studio downtown on Montgomery Street. Projects included a plan for Fisherman's Wharf, housing in North Beach, signage for the Bay Area Rapid Transit (BART) system and the design of the Balboa Station, as well as the couple's own house near the Pacific Ocean.

In California, around 1940, she photographed Northern California Usonian houses designed by Wright, the Paul and Jean Hanna House and the Sidney and Louise Bazett House. From 1938 to 1940, she documented the Golden Gate International Exposition, which took place on Treasure Island near San Francisco. In 1942, during World War II, they temporarily closed their office. Esther worked for the San Francisco Housing Authority with co-director John Savage Bolles on the acquisition of properties for housing war industry workers while Ernest worked on a government project in Brazil.

Esther and Ernest Born's partnership was creative and productive. He participated in many civic activities including service on the San Francisco Art Commission and taught architecture at the University of California from 1951 to 1958 and 1962 to 1974. Esther ran the office and collaborated on the firm's vision, helped execute its commissions and handled the finances. She honed her business skills by taking a summer course in business administration at the University of California Berkeley in 1958.

With the publication of her photographic images, she contributed to Ernest Born’s reputation and public recognition. However, she was not acknowledged in the firm's name "Ernest Born Architect", possibly because she was not a licensed architect. In the publication of their own house at 2020 Great Highway, San Francisco, she is listed as Associate Architect.

The Born firm was one of the few post-war offices who employed women architects, including Elizabeth Boyter, Inka Benton, Jane Moorehead Parug (along with her husband Rifat Parug), and Vera Jansone.

The firm closed in 1971 when Esther’s health prevented her from continuing to work. Ernest continued to collaborate with Walter Horn on their research of the monastery of St. Gall. Soon after they sold their house in 1984, they moved to San Diego to live near their daughter. Esther Born died there in 1987, aged 84.

== Archives ==
Esther Born's photographic images and archives are held in these collections:

- Getty Research Institute, Los Angeles
- Canadian Centre for Architecture, Montreal
- Center for Creative Photography, University of Arizona, Tucson
- Environmental Design Archives, University of California, Berkeley
- The Estate of Ernest and Esther Born

== Published works ==
- “Offices and Tasting Room for Bates & Schoonmaker, New York,” Ernest Born, architect, Esther Born, photographer, Architectural Forum, September 1935, pp. 187–194; and also in Architectural Review, March 1937, V. 81, pp. 128–31.
- “Escuela Industrial Tres Guerras: fotografias de Esther Born,” Edificacion, September 1937, V. 4, No. 5, pp. 9–10.
- Born, Esther, and Justino Fernandez, “The New Architecture in Mexico,” Architectural Record, April 1937, V. 81, pp. 1–86.
- Born, Esther, and Justino Fernandez, The New Architecture in Mexico, New York: W. Morrow and Co, 1937.
- Hanna, Paul and Jean S. Hanna and Frank Lloyd Wright, “Honeycomb House by Frank Lloyd Wright,” photographs by Esther Born, Architectural Record, July 1938, V. 84, pp. 5, 7, 60–74.
- “AIA Exhibit of Architecture,” Ernest Born architect, Esther Born photographer, Architectural Forum, 1938, V. 69, pp. 468–69.
- “To the Historians of Architectural America,” Architectural Forum, Oct. 1940, V. 73, pp. 90–91.
- Wheeler, Joseph Lewis, The American Public Library Building, New York: Scribner’s Sons, 1941, p. 10.
- Waechter, Heinrich Hormuth, Elisabeth Waechter, Schools for the Very Young, New York: F.W. Dodge Corp., 1951, p. 5.
- “Architect takes a lot and a half to give his plain-seeming row house five luxuries”, House and Home, Vol.4, November 1953, p. 128-131.
- Eckbo, Garret, The Art of Home Landscaping, New York: F.W. Dodge, 1956, pp. 88–9.
- Hanna, Paul and Jean S. Hanna, Frank Lloyd Wright’s Hanna House, New York: The Architectural History Foundation, Cambridge, MA, MIT Press, 1981.
- Cardwell, Kenneth, Bernard Maybeck: Artisan, Architect, Artist, Salt Lake City: Peregrine Smith Books, 1983, p. 229 (portrait of Maybeck).
- Ford, James, Katherine Monroe Ford, Classic Modern Homes of the Thirties; 64 Designs by Neutra, Gropius, Breuer, Stone and Others, New York: Dover Publications, 1989, p. 104, (House for Mr. and Mrs. Roger Stoll, Hayward, CA by George Patton Simonds, Photography by Esther Born).
- Eggener, Keith, Luis Barragan’s Gardens of El Pedregal, New York: Princeton Architectural Press, 2001, p. 69.
- Arbunich, Marty, The Bazett House - Hillsborough- A “Paradise Lost” that Eichler never regained – the legendary Bazett house of Frank Lloyd Wright, (does not contain Esther Born’s photos, see Turner, Paul)
- Lejeune, Jean-Francois, Cruelty and Utopia: Cities and Landscapes of Latin America, New York: Princeton Architectural Press, 2005, p. 215.
- Heynen, Hilde, Gulsum Baydar, Negotiating Domesticity: Spatial Productions of Gender in Modern Architecture, New York: Routledge, 2005, p. 224.
- Viladas, Pilar, Twice as Nice, The New York Times Magazine, July 22, 2007, https://www.nytimes.com/2007/07/22/magazine/22Style-t.html?_r=4&adxnnl=1&oref=slogin&ref=magazine&adxnnlx=1185227540-pUY0ioGajPsosfL84+96gA
- Heron, Katrina, This Surfer's Beach House is More Than It Seems, Dwell, 09-2007, http://www.dwell.com/articles/highway-hideaway.html.
- Horton, Inge Schaefer, Early Women Architects of the San Francisco Bay Area - The Lives and Work of Fifty Professionals, 1890-1951, McFarland & Company, Jefferson NC, 2010, p. 168-172.
- Tripping Out on the Architecture of The Outer Sunset along the Great Highway. 17-09-2009, http://theoutersunset.com/tag/ernest-born/
- Olsberg, Nicholas. Architects and Artists: The Work of Ernest and Esther Born, The Book Club of California, San Francisco, 2015.
- Turner, Paul V, Frank Lloyd Wright and San Francisco, Yale University Press, 2016
