= Bernard Frischer =

American archaeologist and classicist

- Born: 1949 (age 76–77); Cleveland, Ohio, U.S.
- Education: Wesleyan University (B.A., 1971); Heidelberg University (Ph.D., 1975)
- Known for: Digital archaeology; Rome Reborn; Digital Hadrian’s Villa; Virtual World Heritage Laboratory
- Awards: Rome Prize; VSMM Pioneer Lifetime Award; Tartessus Lifetime Achievement Prize
- Scientific career
- Fields: Classics, Archaeology, Digital humanities
- Workplaces: University of California, Los Angeles; University of Virginia; Indiana University Bloomington
- Doctoral advisor: Viktor Pöschl

Bernard Frischer (born 1949) is an American archaeologist and classicist best known for pioneering research and public-facing projects in digital archaeology and virtual cultural heritage. He founded the Rome Reborn initiative to reconstruct ancient Rome at multiple historical phases and has led projects including the Digital Roman Forum, Digital Hadrian’s Villa, and the Uffizi–Indiana University 3D Digitization Project. He is a professor at the University of California, Los Angeles and the University of Virginia. He later joined Indiana University and is now professor emeritus at all three universities. His work combines classical philology, Roman topography, 3d simulation, and archaeoastronomy to test historical hypotheses and broaden public access to the ancient world.

== Early life and education ==
Frischer was born in 1949 in Cleveland, Ohio and attended the public schools of Beachwood, an eastern suburb. In 1979 he married Classicist Jane Crawford, a scholar on Cicero and professor of Classics at Loyola Marymount University and the University of Virginia.

He earned a B.A. summa cum laude in Classics from Wesleyan University (1971) and a Ph.D. summa cum laude in Classical Philology from Heidelberg University (1975), where he studied under Viktor Pöschl. In 1970, he published his first article on Euripides’ Hippolytos at the urging of Wolfgang Schadewaldt, in whose Oberseminar at the University of Tübingen he participated during 1969–70. His dissertation, published in 1975 as his first book, examined the influence of Epicureanism on Virgil’s Eclogues.

He won the American Academy in Rome’s Rome Prize (Postdoctoral Fellow, 1974–76) and later served as Resident (1996) and Trustee (2009–2012).

== Academic career ==
Frischer taught Classics at UCLA from 1976 to 2004, chairing the department (1984–88) and directing the UCLA Humanities Computing Facility (1987–88). From 1997 to 2004, he founded and directed the UCLA Cultural Virtual Reality Laboratory, among the first groups to use 3D computer modeling to reconstruct cultural heritage sites.

In 2004, he moved to the University of Virginia as Professor of Art History and Classics and served as Director of the Institute for Advanced Technology in the Humanities (IATH) from 2004 to 2009. In 2009 he established the Virtual World Heritage Laboratory (VWHL). In 2013 he joined Indiana University’s School of Informatics (now the Luddy School of Informatics, Computing, and Engineering), where he was recruited to start the first doctoral program in the United States in the field of Virtual Heritage. He retired at the end of 2023 but continues to co-direct the VWHL with Prof. Gabriele Guidi.

== Research and projects ==
=== Reconstruction of Epicurus’ portrait ===
Frischer’s dissertation argued that the figure of Daphnis in Virgil’s Eclogues symbolized the Epicurean sage, suggesting that seeing such a sage could have a transformative effect similar to the epiphany of a deity. After moving to Rome, Frischer encountered the portrait of Epicurus in the Capitoline Museums and interpreted it less as a literal likeness than as a symbolic depiction of qualities associated with the Epicurean wise man, such as paternal guidance, healing, heroism, and divinity. This interpretation informed his book The Sculpted Word: Epicureanism and Philosophical Recruitment in Ancient Greece.

In this work, Frischer contended that Epicureans faced a tension between their belief that philosophy’s purpose was to bring salvation to humanity and their conviction that active participation in civic life threatened the pursuit of wisdom. As a result, they established communities on the margins of the polis. According to Frischer, they addressed this paradox by placing portraits of their leaders in public spaces. These portraits functioned as “sculpted words,” conveying the school’s message without compromising the philosophers’ detachment. He further argued that such portraits could influence viewers by sparking curiosity and encouraging them to seek out Epicurean communities. The later discovery of a mosaic in Autun was seen as supporting elements of his reconstruction.

=== Rome Reborn ===
Frischer applied ideas from his study of Epicurean portraits to his teaching at UCLA, where he sought ways to engage undergraduates in large lecture courses on Roman civilization. He proposed that a reconstruction of ancient Rome could serve a role similar to that of the Epicurean portrait in sparking curiosity. In 1986, at a conference hosted by Apple Computer, he outlined the concept of creating a digital model of Rome, guided by AI avatars acting as cultural informants.

By the early 1990s, philanthropic funding enabled him to experiment with architectural CAD software to recreate ancient structures. In 1997, he and colleagues launched the Rome Reborn project at the American Academy in Rome. Designed to represent the city as it may have appeared in 320 CE, the project has developed through several versions, with early demonstrations presented at venues such as SIGGRAPH and later integrations with Google Earth. The latest version, Rome Reborn 4.0, was released in 2023 through Flyover Zone, a company founded by Frischer.

=== Digital Sculpture Project ===
Frischer’s early interest in sculpture and restoration is reflected in his book The Sculpted Word (1982). In 2009, he initiated the Digital Sculpture Project to explore the application of 3D technologies to the documentation, analysis, and restoration of sculpture. Early efforts included 3D scanning of the Laocoön statue group in the Vatican Museums, several works in the Dresden State Museums, and the portrait of Caligula in the Virginia Museum of Fine Arts.

In 2016, the Uffizi Galleries and Indiana University began a multi-year collaboration, co-led by Frischer, to 3D-scan and publish high-quality models of hundreds of classical sculptures. By 2020, over 318 sculptures were available on the project’s open-access website. Using knowledge gained from these initiatives, starting in 2020, Frischer oversaw the creation of a commercially available Virtual Museum through his company, offering over 900 interactive 3D models of classical and Egyptian sculptures with metadata.

=== Digital Hadrian’s Villa and archaeoastronomy ===
Through the VWHL, Frischer has directed the Digital Hadrian’s Villa Project, applying simulation and measurement to archaeological pedagogy as well as to questions of design, ritual, and celestial alignment. Studies published between 2013 and 2017 tested relationships between the Ara Pacis, the Montecitorio obelisk, and the so-called Horologium Augusti, as well as astronomical alignments in the parts of Hadrian’s Villa known as Roccabruna and the Antinoeion. These studies employ a method that Frischer called “simpiricism,” enabling scholars to make observations and conduct experiments in vanished historical places through computer simulation.

== Public engagement and entrepreneurship ==
To extend virtual heritage to wider audiences, Frischer founded Flyover Zone (2022), a company producing guided virtual tours and museum experiences drawing on research from Rome Reborn and the VWHL.

== Editorial work and open access ==
Frischer co-founded and served as editor-in-chief of the Q1 journal Digital Applications in Archaeology and Cultural Heritage (2011–2016). In 2016, he and colleagues launched Studies in Digital Heritage, an open-access, peer-reviewed journal hosted by Indiana University, where he served as founding editor-in-chief before becoming editor-in-chief emeritus.

== Honors and recognition ==
- VSMM Pioneer Lifetime Award (2005)
- Tartessus Lifetime Achievement Prize from the Spanish Society of Virtual Archaeology (2009)
- Junior Fellowship, Michigan Society of Fellows (1971–74)
- Two Faculty Research Fellowships, American Council of Learned Societies (1981–82, 1996–97)
- Paul Mellon Senior Fellowship, Center for Advanced Study in the Visual Arts (1997)
- Senior Prize Fellowship, Zukunftskolleg, University of Konstanz (2010–11)
- Fellowship, Netherlands Institute for Advanced Study (2015)
- Research Exemplar Award, Washington University in St. Louis (2017)
- Fellow of the American Academy in Rome

== Selected publications ==
- The Sculpted Word: Epicureanism and Philosophical Recruitment in Ancient Greece (University of California Press, 1982; rev. ed. Humanities E-Books/ACLS, 2007)
- “Project Cicero,” in Microsoft CD-ROM Library, vol. 3 (1988), 145–156
- (ed., with J. W. Crawford and M. De Simone) The Horace’s Villa Project, 1997–2003: Report on New Fieldwork and Research (2 vols., Oxford: BAR, 2007)
- (ed., with A. Dakouri-Hild) Beyond Illustration: 2D and 3D Digital Technologies as Tools for Discovery in Archaeology (Oxford: BAR, 2008)
- “A New Digital Model of the Roman Forum,” in Imaging Ancient Rome: Documentation, Visualization, Imagination (JRA Suppl. 61, 2006), 163–182
- “Archaeoastronomical Experiments Supported by Virtual Simulation Environments: Celestial Alignments in the Antinoeion at Hadrian’s Villa,” Digital Applications in Archaeology and Cultural Heritage 3 (2016): 55–79
- “New Light on the Horologium Augusti, the Montecitorio Obelisk, and the Ara Pacis,” Studies in Digital Heritage 1 (2017): 18–119
- “Roman Sculpture: Three-dimensional Scanning and Modeling,” in The Oxford Handbook of Roman Sculpture (Oxford University Press, 2015), 74–92
- “From Virtual Tourism 1.0 to 2.0. Applying New Media to Support Sustainable Research, Conservation, Communication, and Accessibility,” in Proceedings of Cultural Heritage and New Technology (Vienna, 2021)
