= Rome Reborn =

Digital reconstruction of ancient Rome

- Developer: Flyover Zone Productions
- Publisher: FlyoverZone.com (originally published by RomeReborn.org via University of California at Los Angeles)
- Director: Bernard Frischer
- Engine: Unity
- Platforms: Microsoft Windows; macOS; Oculus Rift; Oculus Go; Samsung GearVR; HTC Vive
- Release: Version 1.0; 2007; Version 2.0; 2008; Version 2.1; 2010; Version 2.2; 2012; Version 3.0; 2018
- Genres: Simulation, Virtual Reality

Rome Reborn is a paid virtual reality project consisting of apps and videos that present a digital reconstruction of Rome during the period of late antiquity. The project produced five individual modules that showcase different monuments and locations in the city during 320 A.D. It provides views that include the Roman forum, the Colosseum (Flavian Amphitheater), and the Pantheon among others.

== History ==
The idea for Rome Reborn initially came from virtual heritage scholar, Bernard Frischer, in 1974. After witnessing Italo Gismondi's miniaturized 3D model of Rome in the Museum of Roman Civilization, Frischer took interest in the possibility of recreating Rome in a virtual format.

The project was launched in 1996 under the development of the UCLA Cultural Virtual Reality Laboratory with Frischer as director. Version 1.0 was completed in 2007 and version 2.0 rolled out in 2008. This version received two subsequent updates with version 2.1 releasing in 2010 and version 2.2 releasing in 2012. The team completely reworked the software for the 3.0 version, making it available to the public through virtual reality devices. It is currently available for Microsoft Windows, macOS, Oculus Rift, Oculus Go, Samsung GearVR, and HTC Vive. The project's budget is estimated to be around $3 million.

For their initial reconstruction of Rome, the University of Virginia development team used the existing physical 3D model of Rome from Gismondi. This allowed them to create their own digital 3D model of Rome which would then be digitally modeled to their standards. In total, the project was developed by roughly 100 people spanning Italy, the United States, Britain, and Germany.

Version 1.0's release was accompanied by a ceremony held on Rome's Capitoline Hill. It was attended by Frischer, the Roman mayor, and many American researchers.

== Controversy ==
Frischer created the initial version of the project with the help of historians and 3D modellers from UCLA. Development on version 2.0 was then transferred to the University of Virginia where paid employees and students were tasked with the version's completion. Upon the release of version 2.0 in 2008, the project was free to download through a 3D Google Earth layer.

During version 3.0's development of an entirely new city model in the period 2009 to the present, Frischer shifted Rome Reborn towards a paid downloadable format, developed and copyrighted the program by his employee-owned business, which operates under the name Flyover Zone.

In early 2019, it was alleged by Sarah Bond that members of the development team for Rome Reborn were subject to exploitation from Frischer. Former members of the development staff at UCLA and the University of Virginia were stated to be dissatisfied with the director using student labour and university funds to release a paid service under his own copyright. A concern was also raised about the occlusion of credit towards developers in the About section of the project's website. Frischer denied these charges in a reply, saying that due credit to earlier developers had been given on the company's project website but had been missed by the critic. To prevent recurrence of this, he added more explicit mention on the About page of the project's website. Frischer also stated that version 3.0 of the Rome Reborn model, which is the one in commercial use, had been created entirely by private funding through his employee-owned company.
