= Plan of Saint Gall =

Medieval architectural drawing of a monastic compound

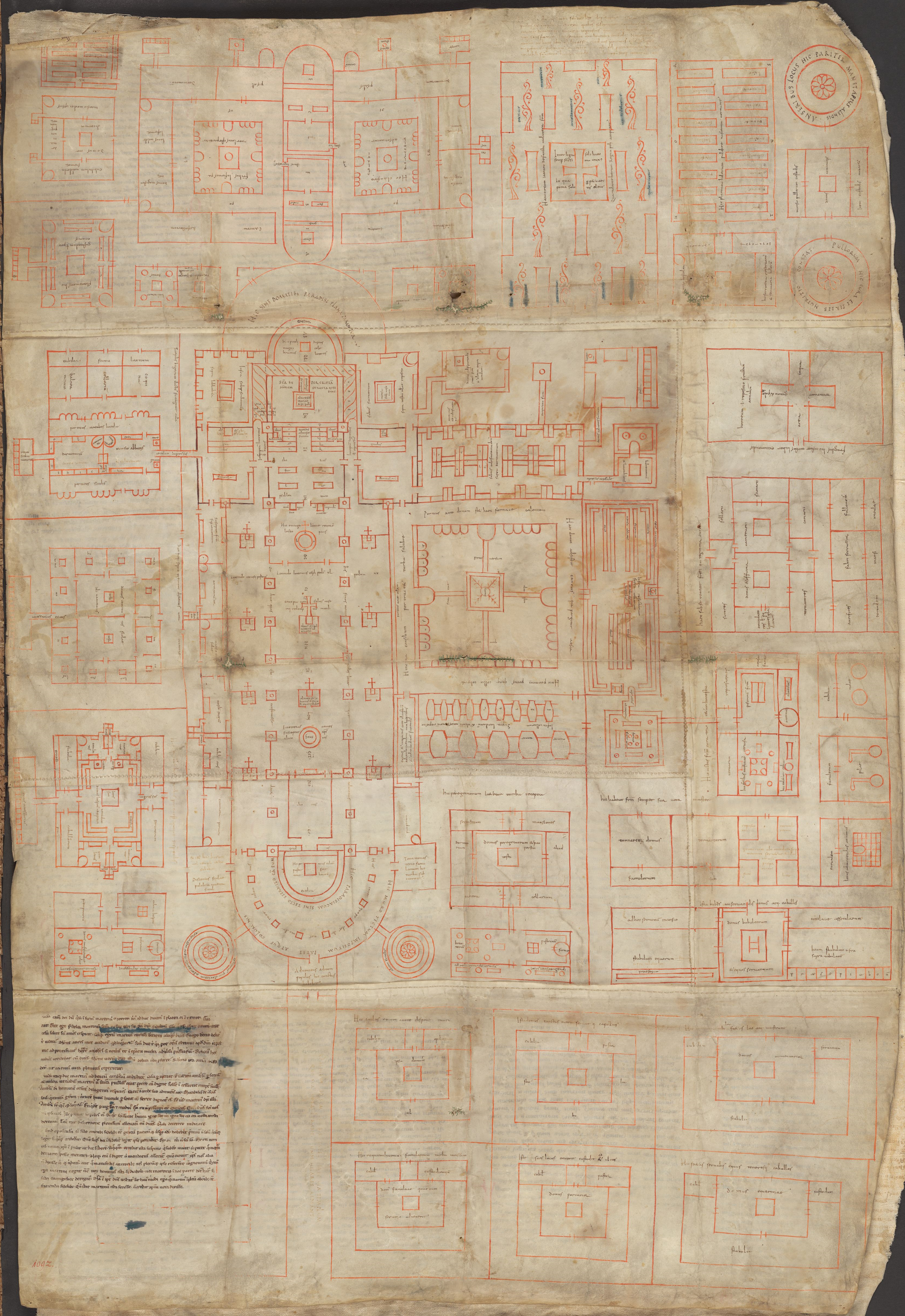
Plan of Saint Gall. Reichenau, early 9th century (ca.820–830). Ms. 1092. Parchment, 1 folio, ca. 112cm x 77.5 cm. Latin.

The Plan of Saint Gall is a medieval architectural drawing of a monastic compound dating from 820–830 AD. It depicts an entire Benedictine monastic compound, including church, houses, stables, kitchens, workshops, brewery, infirmary, and a special building for bloodletting. According to calculations based on the manuscript's tituli the complex was meant to house about 110 monks, 115 lay visitors, and 150 craftmen and agricultural workers.

The Plan was never actually built. It was so named because it is dedicated to Gozbert, abbot of the Abbey of Saint Gall. The planned church was intended to hold the relics of the monastery's founder and namesake, the hermit Saint Gall. The plan was stored in the library of the monastery, the famous Abbey library of Saint Gall, where it remains to this day (indexed as Codex Sangallensis 1092).

It is the only surviving major architectural drawing from the roughly 700-year period between the fall of the Western Roman Empire and the 13th century. It is considered a national treasure of Switzerland and remains a significant object of interest among modern scholars, architects, artists and draftspeople for its uniqueness, its beauty, and the insights it provides into medieval culture.

== Motivations behind the Plan ==
There are two main theories concerning the motivations behind the drawing of the Plan. The dispute between scholars centres around the assertion put forward by Horn and Born in their 1979 work The Plan of Saint Gall, that the Plan in the Stiftsbibliothek Sankt Gallen was a copy of an original drawing issued by the court of Louis the Pious after the synods held at Aachen in 816 and 817. The purpose of the synods was to establish Benedictine monasteries throughout the Carolingian Empire as a bulwark against renewed activity by the Hiberno-Scottish missions from Britain and Ireland who, although now Benedictine, were bringing some elements of Celtic monasticism to the Continent. Horn and Born argued that the Plan was a "paradigmatic" drawing of how a Benedictine monastery should look if the Benedictine Rule was to be strictly followed; a guide for the construction of future monastic ensembles.

Other scholars, particularly Werner Jacobsen, Norbert Stachura and Lawrence Nees have, on the contrary, argued that the Plan is an original drawing made at Reichenau Abbey for the abbot of Saint Gall, Gozbert, who decided to build a new abbey church in the 820s. This argument is based on Jacobsen's observations of marks left by pairs of compasses in the parchment, as well as alterations and changes undertaken during its drawing. Lawrence Nees has also argued that the fact that the manuscript was drawn and written by two scribes, a younger one and an elder who acted as a supervisor "filling in and completing where the knowledge of the main scribe ended", can only be explained if the drawing is an original.

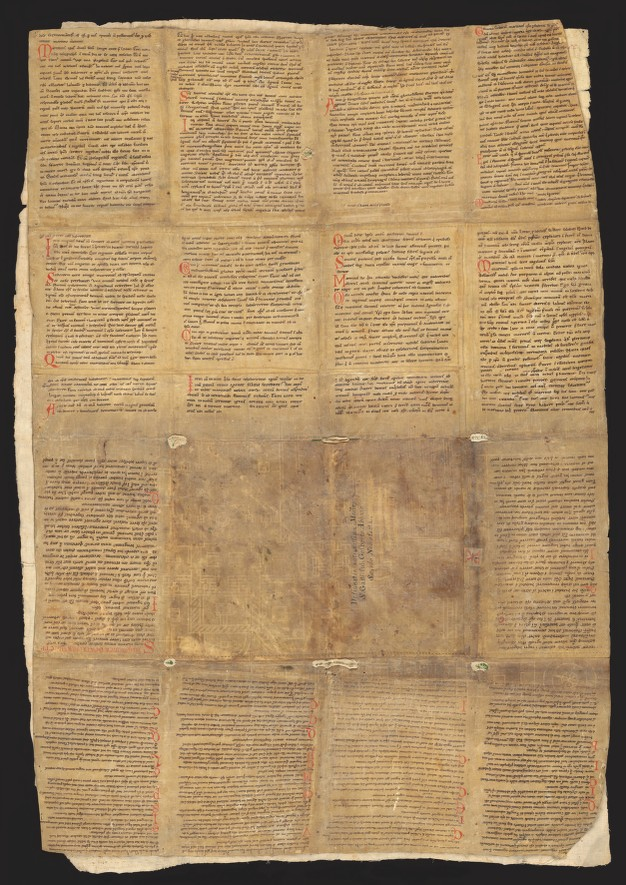
Plan of Saint Gall. Verso. Life of Saint Martin. 12th Century. St. Gallen, Stiftsbibliothek, Cod. Sang. 1092, f. verso – Plan of Saint Gall (https://www.e-codices.ch/en/list/one/csg/1092)

== The manuscript ==
The Plan was created from five parchments sewn together, and measures 113 by 78 centimetres (44 1/2 in × 30 1/2 in). It is drawn with red ink lines for the buildings, and brown ink for lettered inscriptions. The sequence in which the parchment was joined is the following: the first parchment consisted of the drawing of the abbey church and cloister; the second and third parchments were added to the bottom and right side of the original vellum, and here the abbey church was enlarged; buildings were added around the cloister; and the abbot's house, outer school, guest house and pilgrim's house were drawn. A fourth parchment was then added to the top where the infirmary, novitiate, cemetery, orchard, garden were drawn; and finally a fifth parchment was added to the bottom to accommodate the designs for the livestock quarters.

About 333 inscriptions, forty of them in meter, in the handwritings of two different scribes, describe the functions of the buildings. It has been possible to attribute the handwriting of these scribes to the monastery of Reichenau and one of them has been identified as monk Reginbert.

The scale to which the Plan was drawn has also been a subject of dispute. Horn and Born, for example, argue that a single scale was used while others, such as Reinle and Jacobsen, argue that multiple scales were applied for different elements.

The reverse of the Plan was inscribed in the 12th century, after it had been folded into book form, with the Life of Saint Martin by Sulpicius Severus.

=== The Dedication ===
It is widely held that the Plan was dedicated to Gozbertus, the Abbot of St Gall from 816–36.

The text reads [as translated by Horn into English]:

For thee, my sweetest son Gozbertus, have I drawn this briefly annotated copy of the layout of the monastic buildings, with which you may exercise your ingenuity and recognize my devotion, whereby I trust you do not find me slow to satisfy your wishes. Do not imagine that I have undertaken this task supposing you to stand in need of our instruction, but rather believe that out of love of God and in the friendly zeal of brotherhood I have depicted this for you alone to scrutinise. Farewell in Christ, always mindful of us, Amen

The Latin reads:

Haec tibi dulcissime fili cozb(er)te de posicione officinarum paucis examplata direxi, quibus sollertiam exerceas tuam, meamq(ue) devotione(m) utcumq(ue) cognoscas, qua tuae bonae voluntari satisfacere me segnem non inveniri confido. Ne suspiceris autem me haic ideo elaborasse, quod vos putemus n(ost)ris indigere magisteriis, sed potius ob amore(m) dei tibi soli p(er) scrutinanda pinxisse amicabili fr(ater)nitatis intuitu crede. Vale in Chr(ist)o semp(er) memor n(ost)ri ame(n).

== Architectural design and structures ==
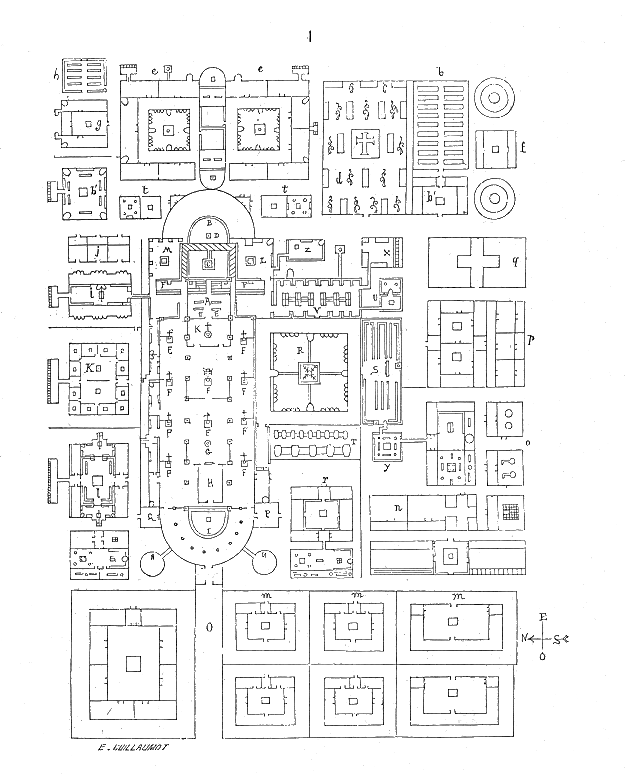
Plan of Saint Gall. Simplified view showing different structures.

As mentioned above the Plan represents a Benedictine monastery and it is possible to see the Benedictine Rule being applied in the architectural design. One of the main aspects of the Rule was the ascetic life of the monks who had to dedicate themselves to prayer, meditation and study, and not worry about worldly matters. For this purpose, the Benedictine Rule required a monastery which was self-sufficient, and which provided for the monks all the necessary facilities, food, and water. The Plan thus depicts 40 ground plans which include not only the properly monastic buildings (basilica, cloister, abbot's house and cemetery) but also secular buildings for the use of lay workers and visitors.

Lynda Coon has identified five distinct "spatial-units":

- Sacred: basilica, round towers, hostel for visiting monks, abbot's house, cemetery and cloister complex.
- Lay: elite guest houses, servant quarters, hospice for pilgrims and the poor.
- Educational: novitiate and outer school for the elite.
- Medicinal: infirmary, physician's house, bloodletting house, herb garden.
- Agricultural and artisanal: workshops, animal pens, houses for agrarian workers and gardens.

She has also identified a status differentiation in the structures which follow the cardinal points. Accordingly, she argues that the northwest is reserved for the secular elite while the southwest is for the secular lower classes. Regarding the sacred spaces, the northeast and southeast is reserved for the monastic elite, and the far east and far south for what she calls "the liminal", that is to say in between lay and monastic.

Alfons Zettler has recently identified another criterion that the authors of the Plan may have followed for the layout of the structures, which does not follow the cardinal points but is determined by a clockwise direction starting and ending at the abbot's house. He argues that the basis of the organisation would have been a division of public/private and lay/monastic which is represented in the Plan by an increasing lay presence in each sector of the monastery when moving around the cloister clockwise from the infirmary.

=== Geometric design method: triangulature and diagram of harmony ===
The design of the Plan of Saint Gall can be understood through a geometric procedure based on triangulature and the diagram of harmony. Valencia (2025) proposes that the nine-part division of the square provides the underlying geometric framework from which the different subdivisions of the plan are generated. Through the application of triangulature and the diagram of harmony, this framework establishes the geometric relationships that regulate the arrangement and proportions of the monastic buildings, including the cloister and its surrounding spaces.

This approach identifies a coherent geometric procedure for projecting the architectural composition, relating geometric construction to the organization of space. It situates the design of the plan within a tradition of practical geometric knowledge associated with medieval architectural practice.

=== The monk's cloister ===
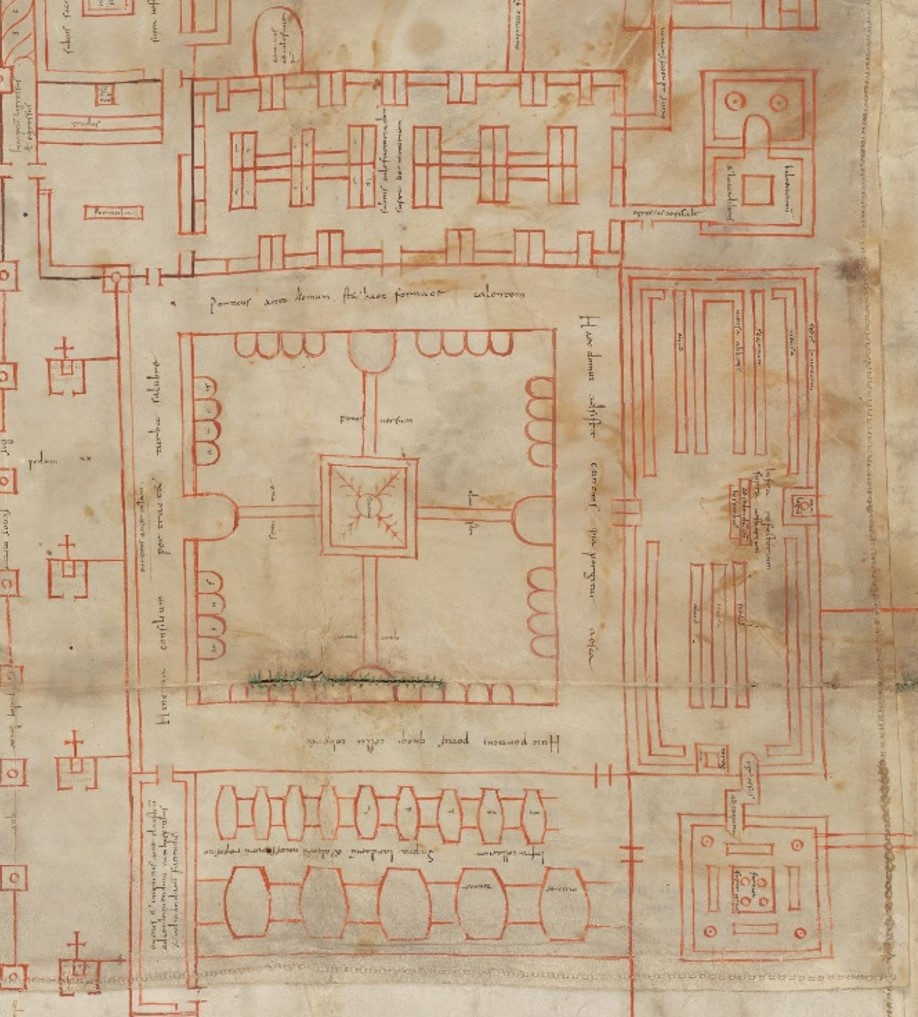
Monk's cloister. Plan of Saint Gall. Buildings surrounding the cloister clockwise from the top: warming room and dormitory, refectory, vestiary and kitchen, cellar and larder (bottom of the picture). The basilica can be seen to the left of the picture.

The monastic cloister occupies the centre of the Plan. It is placed in the southeast aligning itself both with the sacred east and with the poor – the accommodation for pilgrims and the poor is placed in the east just beneath the cloister – far from the worldly commodities and pleasures of the secular elite.

The structure of the cloister is highly symbolic. Firstly, it is a closed space looking inwards to its own centre where a savin tree is placed – sauina – illustrating the ideal of a monk's experience removed from the world. Secondly, it is foursquare and four paths lead from its covered galleries to the centre – semitae per transuersum claustri quattuor – symbolising Jerusalem and its four rivers.

The cloister is surrounded by two-storied buildings consisting of the warming room and dormitory to the east – calefactoria domus and dormitorium – the refectory, vestiary and kitchen to the south – refectorium, uestiarium and coquinam – and the cellar and larder to the west – cellarium and lardarium. The monks, as well as the abbot, had a private entrance to the basilica either through their dormitory or through the portico of the cloister.

=== The abbot's house ===
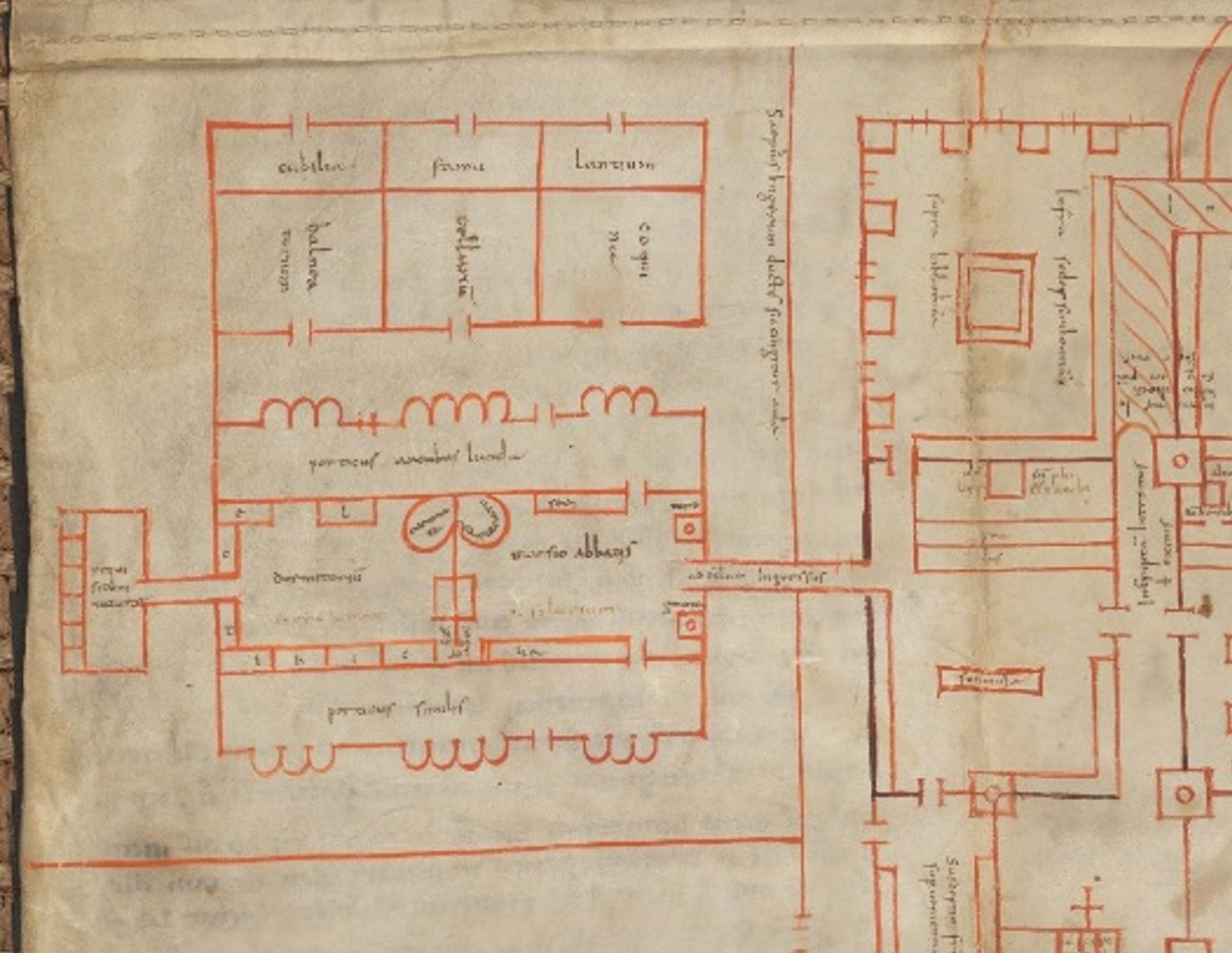
Abbot's House. Plan of Sain Gall. See private passageway to Basilica (right of image).

The abbot's intermediary position between the clerical and lay worlds is seen in the position of his accommodation on the Plan. The abbot's quarters are located at the other side of the abbey church from the monk's cloister, to the north-east, aligning itself with the secular elite guest houses where the royalty, the emperor and the emperor's court would lodge. The abbot's house also looks over the infirmary and novitiate to the east, the outer school and the house for elite guests to the west.

The abbot's house faces outwards, its porticoes opening to the outside world, in opposition with the monk's cloister porticoes which open to an enclosed green space. However, in order to comply with an ascetic way of life and to the Benedictine Rule, the abbot shares his bedroom and privy with seven other monks, and his servant quarters are set apart.

Finally, the abbot's residence has a privileged entry to the east-end of the basilica through a private passageway – ad eclesiam ingressus – signalling his spiritual status as head of the monastery.

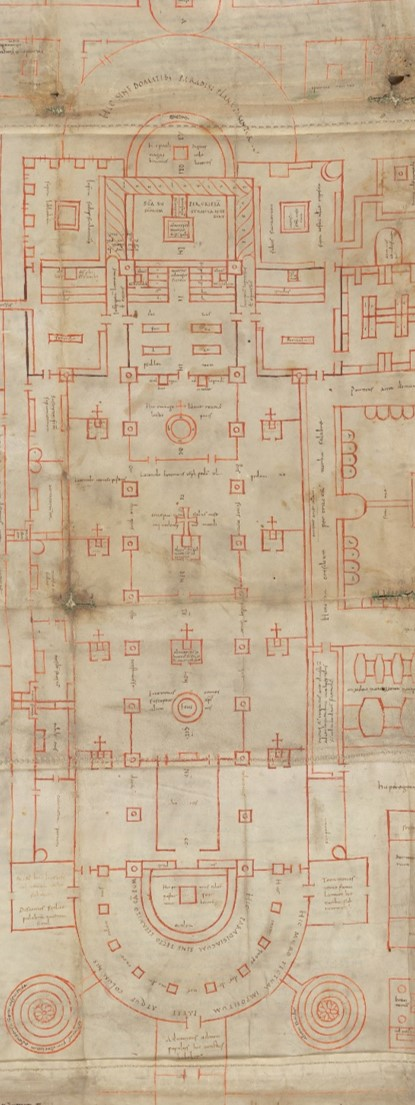
Basilica. Plan of Saint Gall.

=== The basilica ===
The monastery church or basilica is cruciform in shape and doubled-apsed to the east and to the west. It measures c.91.44 meters from apse to apse, the nave is c.12 meters in width and each aisle is c.6 meters in width.

In the west entrance there are two towers dedicated to St. Michael (northern tower) and St. Gabriel (southern tower). The inscriptions on the towers – ad universa super inspicienda – give them a surveillance function while no indication of bells is given.

The entrance to the church is also the only entrance to the whole monastic complex and it is marked by a square porch inscribed: Adueniens adytum populus hic cunctus habebit (Here all the arriving crowd will find their entry). From here the visitors are directed to a semi-circular atrium where they are separated to different parts of the monastery depending on their status – the elite is directed to the north gate and the pilgrims and lower-classes to the south gate – or to the church.

The interior of the church is divided by columns and railings which not only direct the lay visitors to their authorised spaces but also block their view of the sacred east where the altar of Saint Mary and Saint Gall is placed. According to Horn and Born only one-sixth of the church is accessible to seculars while five-sixths of it is reserved for the sole use of the monks. Lay guests are only admitted in the side aisles of the church, the area around the baptismal font – fons – and the crypt – cripta; the only place in the church where monks and seculars mix to worship at the tomb of Saint Gall. The transept, the presbytery, the nave and the two apses (dedicated to Saint Peter to the west and Saint Paul to the east) being solely for the ascetics' use.

The northern and southern aisles of the basilica are furnished with four altars each. The northern aisle houses the altars (from west to east) of Saints Lucia and Cecilia, of the Holy Innocents, of Saint Martin, and of Saint Stephen. The altars on the southern aisle are dedicated (from west to east) to Saints Agatha and Agnes, to Saint Sebastian, to Saint Mauritius, and to Saint Lawrence.

The nave opens to the aisles through nine arcades in each side, three of them "railed off" to prevent the entry of laymen. The main surface of the nave houses the baptismal font, the altar of Saint John the Baptist and Saint John the Evangelist, the altar of the Holy Saviour at the Cross and the ambo. The transept is separated from the nave by further screens and railings, in its southern arm is the altar of Saint Andrew and in its northern arm the altar of Saints Philipp and James. From the transcript the monks and lay brothers access the crypt. Finally, at the easternmost of the church is the presbytery with the high altar dedicated to Saint Mary and Saint Gall.

== Derivative works ==
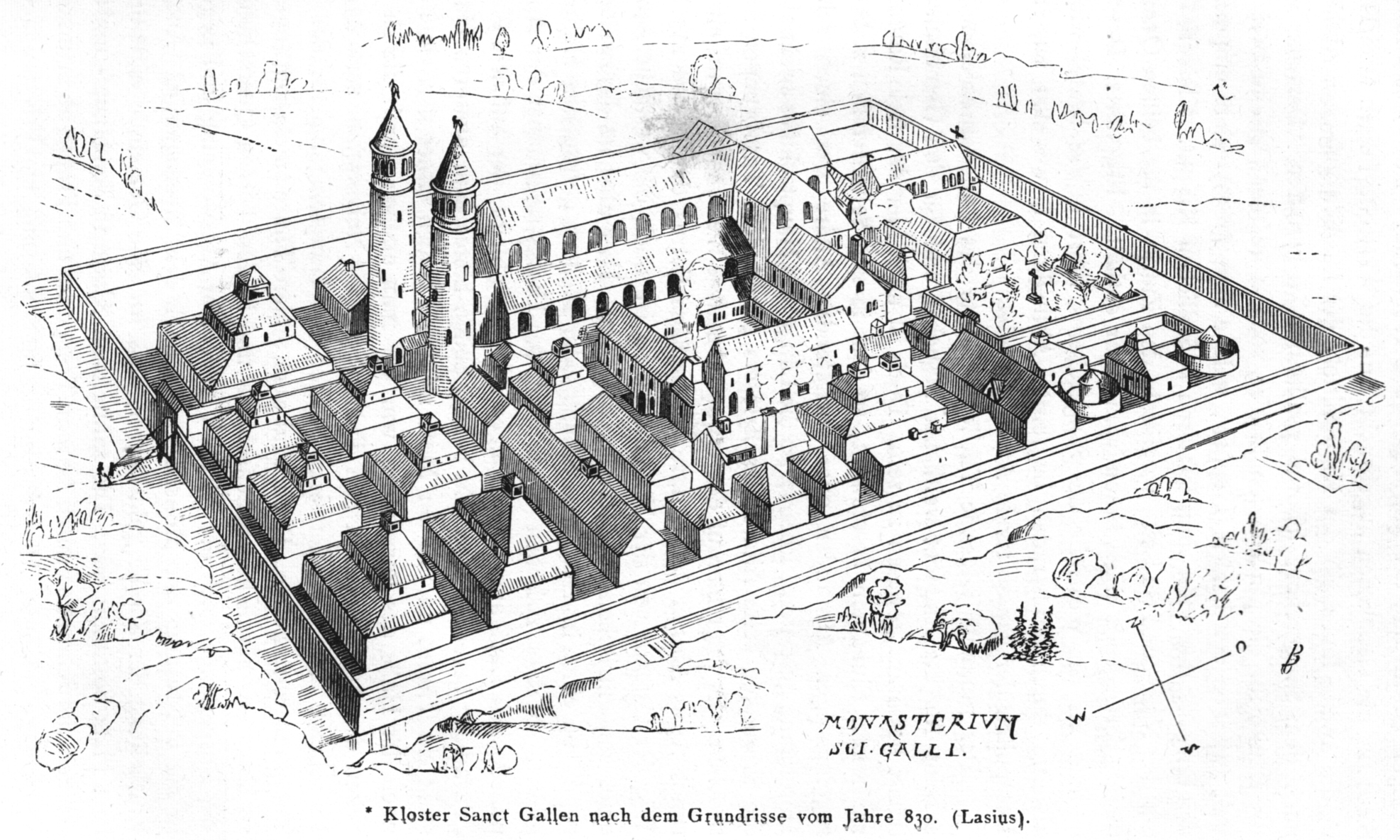
Artist's reconstruction of the buildings in the plan by J. Rudolf Rahn, 1876.

=== Umberto Eco ===
According to Earl Anderson (Cleveland State University), it is likely that Umberto Eco references the plan in his novel The Name of the Rose:

"perhaps larger but less well proportioned" (p. 26): Adso [a character in the book] mentions actual monasteries that he had seen in Switzerland and France (St. Gall, Cluny, Fontenay), but the standard of "proportion" most likely alludes to the Carolingian (9th century) "Plan of St. Gall," which sets forth an architectural plan for an ideal monastery.

=== Models ===
The Plan has inspired a tradition of model making. In 1965 Ernest Born and others created a scale model of the plan for the Age of Charlemagne exhibition in Aachen, Germany. This became the inspiration for the book he co-authored in 1979 with Walter Horn, but was also the first in a tradition of modeling the plan. More recently the plan has been modeled on computers using CAD software. It is possible to see the different models in the Saint Gall Project website.

=== Campus Galli ===
Campus Galli is a Carolingian monastic community under construction in Meßkirch, Baden-Württemberg, Germany. The construction project includes plans to build a medieval monastery according to the early 9th-century Plan of Saint Gall using techniques from that era. The long-term financing of the project is to come from revenue generated from the site's operation as a tourist attraction. The construction site has been open for visitors since June 2013.

=== St. Gall Project ===
The St. Gall Project was founded to produce a digital online presence for the plan including models and an extensive online database on early medieval monastic culture. The project is directed by Patrick Geary (UCLA) and Bernard Frischer (University of Virginia) with funding from the Andrew W. Mellon Foundation. The website was released to the public in December 2007. Future resources will include intellectual and textual aspects of the plan and monasticism; space for publication of new papers and research, lesson plans and teaching aides, blogs and chat rooms. By 2023, the once-useful site was no longer available.

== Bibliography ==
- Coon, L. (2011). "Chapter 6. Gendering the Plan of Saint Gall". Dark Age Bodies: Gender and Monastic Practice in the Early Medieval West. Philadelphia: University of Pennsylvania Press. pp. 165–215. ISBN 978-0-8122-4269-0.
- Heitz, C. (1994). "Nouvelles perspectives pour le Plan de Saint Gall". Bulletin de la Société Nationale des Antiquaires de France pour 1992. 1992: 169–173. doi:10.3406/bsnaf.1994.9735.
- Horn, W.; Born, E. (1979). The Plan of St. Gall: A Study of the Architecture & Economy of, & Life in a Paradigmatic Carolingian Monastery, Volumes I–III. Berkeley: University of California Press. ISBN 0-520-01724-2.
- McClendon, C (2005). The origins of Medieval Architecture. London.
- Nees, L. (1986). "The Plan of Saint Gall and the Theory of the Program of Carolingian Art". Gesta. 25 (1 – Essays in Honor of Whitney Snow Stoddard): 1–8. doi:10.2307/766891. JSTOR 766891. S2CID 163824526.
- Price, L. (1982). The Plan of Saint Gall in Brief. Berkeley: University of California Press. ISBN 9780520043343.
- Rahn, J. Rudolf (1876). Geschichte der Bildenden Künste in der Schweiz. Von den Ältesten Zeiten bis zum Schlusse des Mittelalters (in German). Zürich.
- "The Plan of St.Gall" www.stgallplan.org. Retrieved 2019-02-24.
- Zettler, A. (2015). "Spaces for servants and provendarii in Early Medieval Monasteries. The example of the virtual monastery of the Plan of Saint Gall". Bulletin du centre d'études médievales d'Auxerre (Hors-série no.8). doi:10.4000/cem.13624.

== See also ==
- Carolingian art
- Rule of Saint Benedict
- Abbey of Saint Gall
- Cluniac Reforms
- Charlemagne
- Louis the Pious
- Carolingian Empire
