= Ernest Born =

American architect

- Born: Ernest Alexander Born; February 21, 1898; San Francisco, California, US
- Died: May 9, 1992 (aged 94); San Diego, California, US
- Education: University of California, Berkeley
- Known for: Architecture
- Spouse: Esther Baum Born

Ernest Born (February 21, 1898 − May 9, 1992) was an architect, designer, and artist based in California. He and his wife Esther Baum Born (1902−1987) collaborated on diverse projects in the San Francisco Bay Area from 1936 on. He was also a notable architectural photographer.

Ernest was born in San Francisco, Esther in Palo Alto, and they married in 1926 after meeting at UC Berkeley's architecture school.

== Education ==
Born studied architecture at the University of California, Berkeley, graduating from the school of Architecture in 1922. After graduation he traveled to Europe on a Guggenheim Fellowship, then returned to UC Berkeley earning a master's degree in 1923, with a thesis on the relation of painting to architecture.

In 1928, he traveled to France to attend the American Beaux-Arts School at Fontainebleau.

== Career ==
Between 1923 and 1928, Born worked for prominent San Francisco architects such as John W. Reid Jr., John Galen Howard, and George W. Kelham.

The couple relocated to New York's Greenwich Village in 1929. Esther took a job with Wallace Harrison, the architect overseeing the creation of Rockefeller Center. Ernest spent time as a draftsman at Shreve, Lamb & Harmon, designers of the Empire State Building. In 1931, he received his license to practice architecture in New York. and opened his own architectural practice, working on a wide variety of projects ranging from designing commercial spaces and exhibitions to architectural advertising. He served on the editorial staff of Architectural Record from 1933 to 1934 and Architectural Forum from 1935 to 1936.

In 1937, he received his license to practice architecture in California. and the Borns returned to San Francisco. They went into business together, working residential, commercial and industrial projects, exhibitions, and photography. The Borns exhibited and promoted the then new Second Bay Tradition (1928−1942), and were part of the Third Bay Tradition (1945−1980s) of Modernist architecture and design.

Born taught architecture at UC Berkeley for almost 2 decades. He was initially a lecturer in 1951, then a Professor (1952-1958 and 1962–1974).

In 1955, he became a Fellow of the American Institute of Architects (FAIA).

The Borns closed their design studio in 1973, later moved to San Diego where they lived in their retirement.

== Notable Public Buildings ==
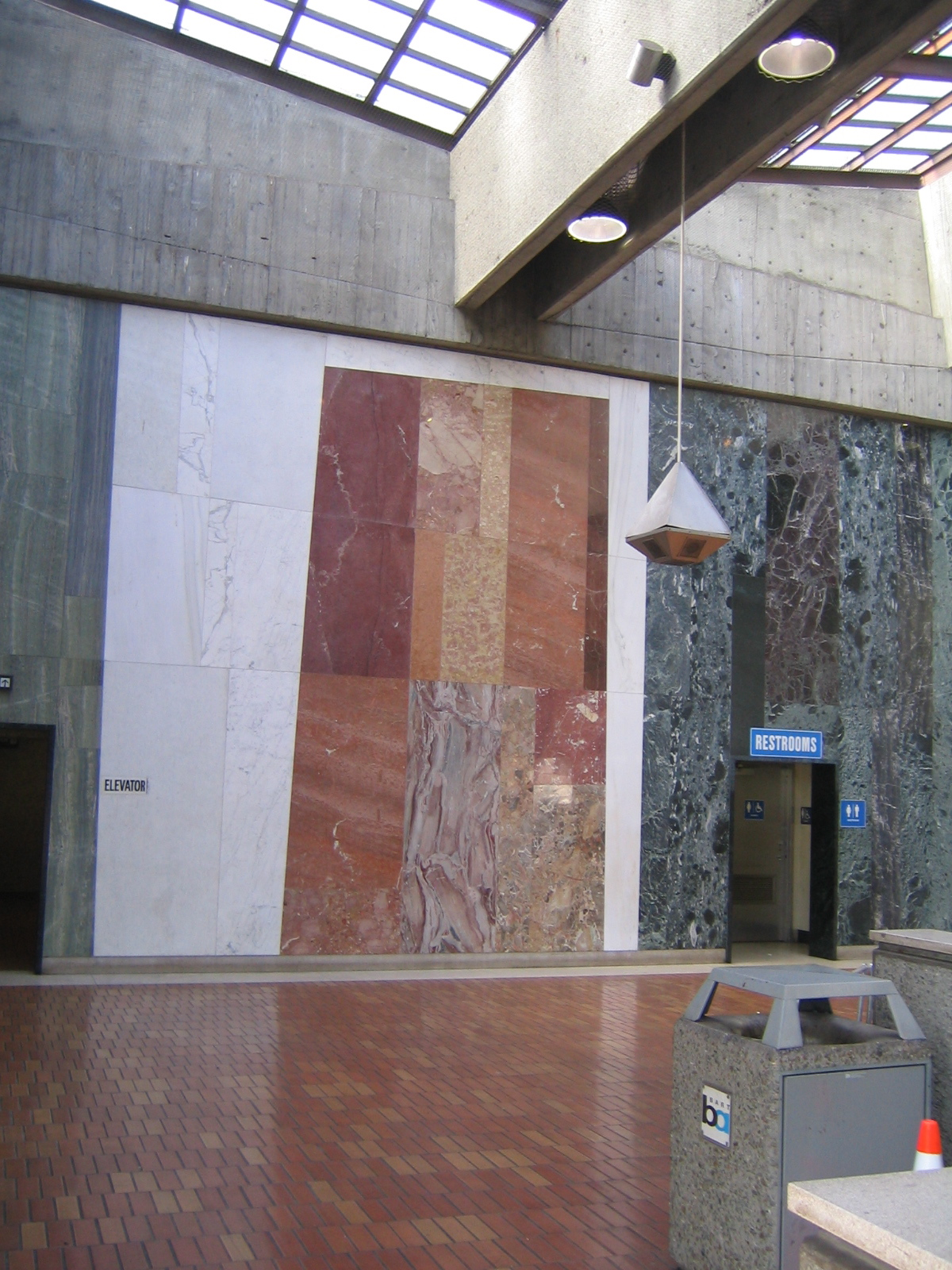
Glen Park BART Station, with natural light on the concourse and an abstract mural in marbles.

Born designed several buildings for the Golden Gate International Exposition, a World's fair from 1939 to 1940 celebrating the construction of the Golden Gate Bridge. In 1937, Treasure Island, an artificial island in the San Francisco Bay, was constructed to host the fair. Born designed the "Main Portal", a monumental entrance consisting of five staggered volumes each at the left and right site of a central passage.

Born designed several notable public buildings in San Francisco. 1951, in collaboration with architect Henry H. Gutterson, Born designed North Beach Place, a public housing project at the cable car turntable on Taylor Street. It was demolished in 2001. In 1961, Born redeveloped and modernized recreation areas and transportation structures along Fisherman's Wharf, an area of San Francisco's North Beach neighborhood. The project stretched along the coastline from Pier 33 on the east to Black Point on the west. In 1975, a collaborative project between Born and Lawrence Halprin resulted in the United Nations Plaza Fountain. This fountain was a source of controversy for many decades due to its use by the homeless population. In the 1970s, Born collaborated with Corlett & Spackman in the design of two Bay Area Rapid Transit (BART) stations, the Balboa Park Station and Glen Park Station. The Glen Park Station was Born's last architectural design project.

Born also worked in Berkeley. In 1950, Born designed the Pacific School of Religion, a seminary located north of the UC Berkeley campus. In 1957, Born worked on alterations to the Hearst Greek Theatre in Berkeley. He designed a basement backstage area, which includes a large plaza flanked by two stage-level constructions.

== Notable Private Residences ==
In the 1940s, Born designed at least three houses for faculty from Stanford University and UC Berkeley. The two faculty houses at Stanford were the Isaac James Quillen House and the Anatole and Josephine Mazour House. The Mazour house is located next door to the Hanna House, which was designed by Frank Lloyd Wright. Born also designed the house of Walter Horn, who he later collaborated with to write and illustrate texts on medieval architecture. The Horn House is located in Richmond on a steep hill and projects out over the down slope. Multiple rooms commanded views of Marin County and the Golden Gate. The original portion of the house was a polygon. The windward side of the house, which is prone to squalls and wind, had a metal frame covered in weather-resistant stucco, while the rest of the dwelling was clad in flush redwood boards over wood framing.

In 1949 the Borns designed the 'Ernest and Esther Born House' for themselves, a Modernist residence located at 2020 Great Highway in the far west of the Sunset District. The house has since been modified with the addition of a tower.

== Other projects ==
His mural paintings for the Golden Gate International Exposition established his reputation as an artist. His drawings for a proposed United Nations Center, with William Wurster and Theodore Bernardi, were exhibited in San Francisco and New York museums. During the war years, Born worked with architect Gardner Dailey on special military projects in Brazil and in the U.S.

The Borns' 1958 vision for "Embarcadero City" for the San Francisco Port Authority, a master plan for the waterfront from the Ferry Building to Aquatic Park that would have replaced most existing structures with new buildings and piers with landfill, was never built.

Born was an accomplished artist, type designer, and illustrator as well, and focused on these in his later years. In the 1970s, Born designed signage for the Bay Area Rapid Transit (BART) system. Born and art historian Walter Horn collaborated on The Barns of the Abbey of Beaulieu at Its Granges of Great Coxwell and Beaulieu St. Leonard, which was published by the UC Berkeley Press in 1965. Then, Born and Horn spent a decade collaborating to produce the 1979 Plan of St. Gall; Born drew the illustrations.

Ernest Born died in 1992, at the age of 94.

== See also ==
- Esther Baum Born
- Charles and Ray Eames — contemporary couple collaborating in Southern California.
- Architecture in the San Francisco Bay Area
