= Timothy L. Pflueger =

American architect

- Pflueger in 1936, sketched by Peter van Valkenburg
- Born: Timothy Ludwig Pflueger; September 26, 1892; San Francisco, California
- Died: November 20, 1946 (aged 54); San Francisco, California
- Occupation: Architect
- Practice: Miller and Colmesnil; J. R. Miller; Miller and Pflueger; Timothy L. Pflueger and Associates
- Buildings: Our Lady of the Wayside Church; Castro Theatre; Alameda Theatre; Pacific Telephone & Telegraph Company Building; 450 Sutter Street; Roosevelt Middle School; San Francisco Stock Exchange; 100 McAllister Street; Paramount Theatre; George Washington High School; Transbay Terminal; City College of San Francisco; Abraham Lincoln High School; I. Magnin flagship store at Union Square
- Projects: 600 Stockton Street expansion for Metropolitan Life Insurance; Cirque Lounge, Fairmont Hotel; Bay Bridge, consulting architect; Patent Leather Bar, St. Francis Hotel; Top of the Mark; Golden Gate International Exposition; Union Square Garage and Plaza

Timothy Ludwig Pflueger (September 26, 1892 – November 20, 1946) was an architect, interior designer and architectural lighting designer in the San Francisco Bay Area in the first half of the 20th century. Together with James R. Miller, Pflueger designed some of the leading skyscrapers and movie theaters in San Francisco in the 1920s, and his works featured art by challenging new artists such as Ralph Stackpole and Diego Rivera. Rather than breaking new ground with his designs, Pflueger captured the spirit of the times and refined it, adding a distinct personal flair. His work influenced later architects such as Pietro Belluschi.

Pflueger, who started as a working-class draftsman and never went to college, established his imprint on the development of Art Deco in California architecture yet demonstrated facility in many styles including Streamline Moderne, neo-Mayan, Beaux-Arts, Mission Revival, Neoclassical and International. His work as an interior designer resulted in an array of influential interior spaces, including luxurious cocktail lounges such as the Top of the Mark at the Mark Hopkins Hotel, the Patent Leather Bar at the St. Francis Hotel and the Cirque Room at The Fairmont, three of the most successful San Francisco bars in their day.

Pflueger's social and business connections spanned the city, including three private men's clubs which he joined: the Bohemian Club, the Olympic Club and The Family. He designed buildings and interior architecture for the latter two. Pflueger was highly placed in several important planning organizations: He was the chairman of a committee of consulting architects on the Bay Bridge project and he served on the committee responsible for the design of the Golden Gate International Exposition in 1939. Pflueger was a board member of the San Francisco Art Association starting in 1930, and served variously as chair and director. While on the board, Pflueger helped the organization found the San Francisco Museum of Modern Art (SFMOMA).

== Early life ==
Pflueger was born the second of seven sons in the Potrero Hill area of San Francisco to German immigrants August Pflueger and Ottilie Quandt who had met in Los Angeles and married. Other Quandt relatives lived in the Noe Valley neighborhood, and, in 1904, the Pflueger family moved closer, to 1015 Guerrero Street in the Mission District, a melting pot neighborhood of blue-collar workers. At age 11, Pflueger took his first job working for a picture-framing firm near his home.

After the 1906 San Francisco earthquake, Pflueger continued his grade-school education, graduating at age 13 in a mass ceremony held in Golden Gate Park for all the city's devastated public schools. By 1907, Pflueger was working as a draftsman and soon joined the architectural firm Miller and Colmesnil, under the guidance of James Rupert Miller, senior partner. Young Pflueger sketched ornamental details based on ideas from his bosses, and attended Mission High Evening School to further his education. In 1911, Pflueger joined the San Francisco Architectural Club (SFAC), an organization that helped budding architects receive training in the informal Atelier Method where older experts taught the practical side of architecture including waterproofing, lighting and structural concerns to students who had no hope or wish to study Beaux-Arts in an established school abroad. Pflueger became thoroughly involved with SFAC's collegial activities and was chosen director in 1914.

== Early career ==
In 1912, while Miller and Colmesnil were busy with their entry in the competition to redesign San Francisco City Hall as well as with the design of many new hotels, apartments and private homes, Timothy L. Pflueger was given the opportunity to serve as chief architect on a rural church project funded by The Family, a club to which Miller belonged. Pflueger designed Our Lady of the Wayside Church with a main theme of Spanish Mission Revival based on his childhood familiarity with Mission San Francisco de Asís (locally known as Mission Dolores) but added his own personal statement: a striking Georgian main entrance topped by a scrolled pediment. After working with sub-contractor members of The Family on the project, Pflueger joined the club himself. The rural church was declared California Historical Landmark number 909 in 1977.

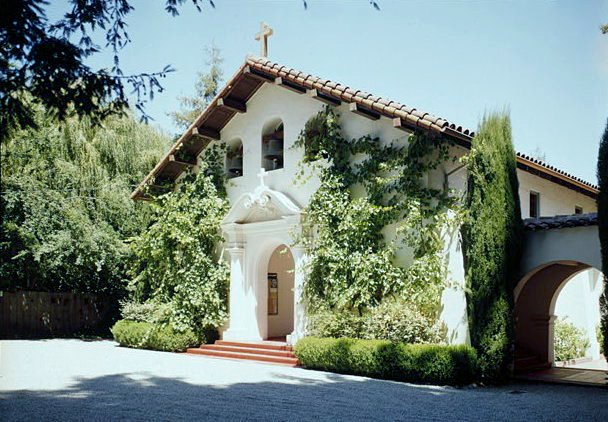
Our Lady of the Wayside Church (1912), a rural Catholic church in Portola Valley

Colmesnil left the firm some time around 1913, leaving Miller to conduct business as "J. R. Miller". Subsequently, Pflueger was assigned by Miller to work closely with the firm's major client, Metropolitan Life Insurance Company, who engaged in a succession of expansion projects at their San Francisco location at 600 Stockton Street. The first expansion, completed in 1914, gave the building a roof garden, dining room, kitchen and subbasement.

Pflueger volunteered for World War I in 1917, working for the Quartermaster Corps to design base facilities. He was first stationed in Washington, D.C. and then sent to San Juan, Puerto Rico to take part in base expansion there. Returning to San Francisco in 1919, Pflueger once again focused on the Metropolitan Life Insurance Company, who now wished for a further doubling in size, extending their Stockton Street frontage 140 feet to California Street, and adding a seventh floor. A massive new entrance incorporating 17 Ionic columns was erected, topped by a pediment displaying a tableau carved by Armenian sculptor Haig Patigian. The Neoclassic-style project was completed in 1920. In 1984, the building was designated San Francisco Landmark No. 167.

== 1920s ==
In June 1920, Pflueger passed his architecture licensing exams to become a certified California architect. He was elected president of the SFAC later that year, taking office in early 1921.

J. R. Miller, relying more and more on Pflueger's hard-working energy, social conviviality and artistic talent, gave him a wide variety of assignments including designs for an automobile showroom, a firehouse and a number of private homes. Pflueger extended his proposed styles to include Aztec elements and Spanish Colonial Revival themes, the latter favored by several clients for their homes.

Miller made Pflueger his junior partner following their completion of the US$80,000 San Francisco Stock Exchange building at 350 Bush Street in 1923. The firm conducted business as Miller and Pflueger. The building at 350 Bush, a neoclassic design topped with a pediment displaying a sculpture by Jo Mora and later called the San Francisco Mining Exchange, is currently empty; it was designated San Francisco Landmark No. 113 in 1980.

=== Skyscrapers ===
The newly built Pacific Telephone & Telegraph Company Building towered over its neighbors.

Miller and Pflueger were selected in 1923 to build an expansive new headquarters tower for Pacific Telephone & Telegraph. In June 1924, Pflueger showed his plans for a $3 million skyscraper, 26 stories high, designed with continuous vertical elements and a progression of step-backs narrowing the floors near the top. Arthur Frank Mathews was brought in to paint a mural in the boardroom on the 18th floor. The structure was fully devoted to offices for 2,000 employees, mostly female. Pflueger's vision was strongly influenced by Eliel Saarinen's second-place entry in the competition to design the Tribune Tower in Chicago. In June, 1925, the Pacific Telephone & Telegraph Company Building was completed for $4 million ($73 million in current value), becoming the tallest building in San Francisco for the next 40 years, tied by the Russ Building in 1927.

450 Sutter Street was completed on October 15, 1929, using a primarily unbroken exterior verticality without step-backs, featuring triangular thrust window bays, the whole decorated with stylized Mayan designs impressed on the terra cotta sheathing and inscribed in metals, marble and glass within the luxurious lobby. In 1983, Pietro Belluschi said that the vertical triangular faceted lines of 450 Sutter formed part of the inspiration for the similarly faceted exterior of 555 California.

As the Telephone Building was being completed in 1925, a group of Methodist Episcopalians came to Pflueger, asking him to design a new skyscraper containing both a church and a hotel for them at 100 McAllister Street. After a dispute, Miller and Pflueger were fired from the project to be replaced by Lewis P. Hobart. Miller and Pflueger sued for $81,600, alleging that Hobart's design was not significantly changed from Pflueger's original. Three months after the hotel and church opened in January 1930, Miller and Pflueger won $38,000 in court, equivalent to $732,000 today.

=== Artists ===
By the late 1920s, Pflueger was already working with a number of artists such as Haig Patigian, Jo Mora and Arthur Mathews who provided fine detail and craftsmanship to his larger designs.

In March 1928, Pflueger published his submission for a new building to house the San Francisco Stock Exchange, featuring strong Zigzag Moderne themes with classicist notes. Miller and Pflueger won the competition for the commission. Eight months later, the Exchange committee decided instead to rebuild the Sub-treasury building at 301 Pine Street while keeping its Tuscan columns and entrance steps, requiring a completely new approach. Pflueger's first response was a sketch with little ornamentation. Construction began in December 1928. By January 1929, Pflueger's plans indicated prominent sculptures, bas-reliefs, inscriptions and carvings, to be detailed by local artists.

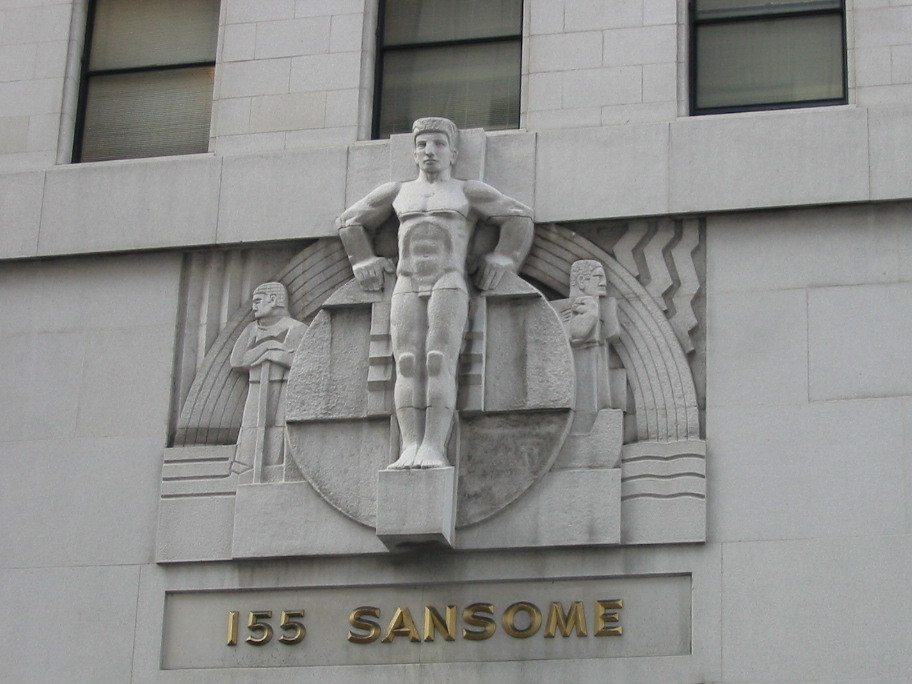
Ralph Stackpole's monumental stone figures top the entrance to 155 Sansome, the Stock Exchange Tower.

Also in January, Pflueger booked a flight in a small mail plane heading for New York but a winter storm forced the pilot and his two passengers down in the Sierras. The three men waited 36 hours exposed to the cold before being rescued. Pflueger immediately continued his trip and met with his Metropolitan Life Insurance clients regarding a third expansion project.

Early in 1929, Pflueger met Ralph Stackpole, an art professor at California School of Fine Arts and a former student of Mathews, who agreed to sculpt monumental figures for the stock exchange project as well as recommending and supervising other artists. Stackpole wrote later of his experience that "the artists were in from the first. They were called in conference and assumed responsibility and personal pride in the building." Pflueger hired nine artists to help decorate the neighboring Stock Exchange Tower at 155 Sansome, and instructed them only to keep their themes light and airy. Diego Rivera was brought with some difficulty from Mexico to paint a two-story mural in the stairwell between the 10th and 11th floors of the Stock Exchange Luncheon Club (now the City Club). Stackpole himself worked with a crew of assistants to direct carve heroic figures in stone above the tall 155 Sansome entrance, as well as carving two large sculpture groups flanking the Tuscan columns of 301 Pine Street.

=== Architectural lighting design ===
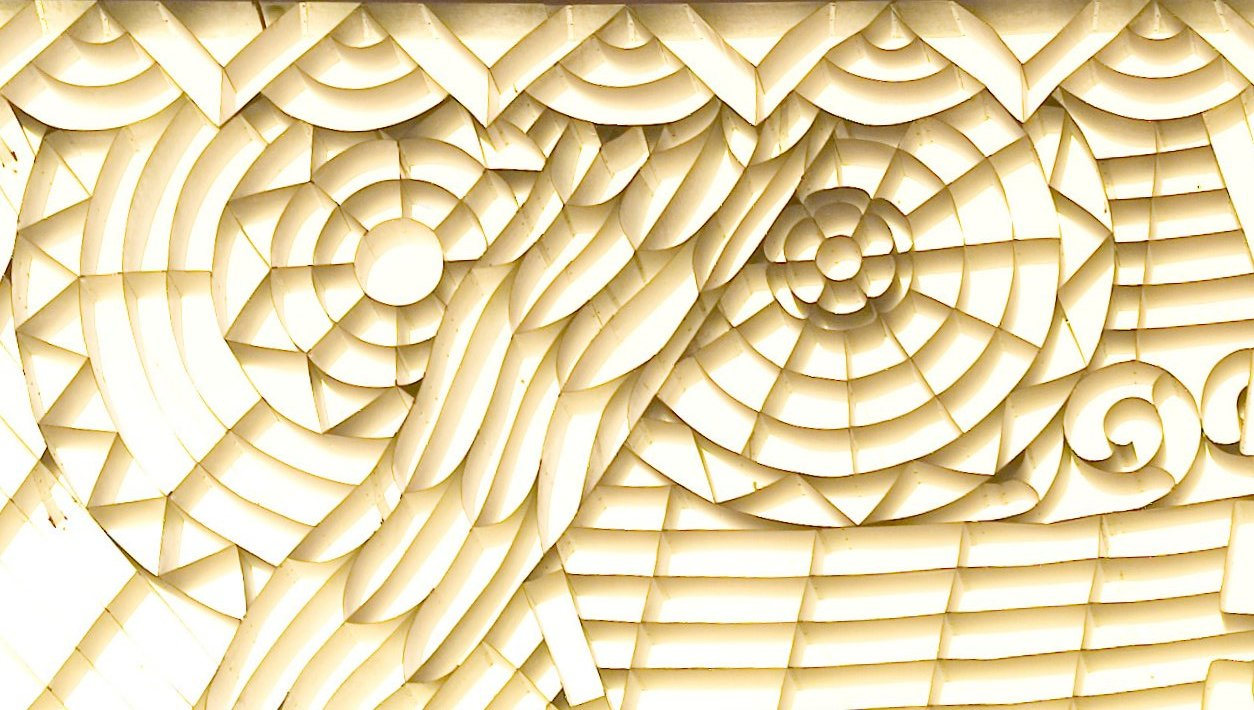
Detail of the Paramount Theatre's ceiling grid and indirect lighting system patented by Pflueger

Over the Stock Exchange floor, Pflueger mounted a ceiling composed of interconnected sheet metal strips above which he used indirect lighting to soften the edges and reduce shadows made by traders on the floor below. The result was so effective that Pflueger used it on a much larger scale above the audience seating at the Paramount Theatre in Oakland, where it extended from and formed a continuity with the incised art on the proscenium. In Oakland, Pflueger flanked the stage with structures that appeared to be pillars supporting the proscenium but were instead layered, curved sheets of thin metal behind which lighting instruments cast light indirectly to give the columns a suffused glow. In 1931, he used the same concept to frame the stage at the Bal Tabarin (now Bimbo's 365 Club), and to bring a changing palette of color to the ceiling above the dance floor. Pflueger filed for and, in 1934, received two architectural lighting design patents, one for his ceiling grid with indirect lighting and one for the thin metal panels hiding lighting instruments. He used the patented ceiling grid once more in the Patent Leather Bar, in 1939.

Metropolitan Life Insurance expanded their 600 Stockton location yet again in 1929, with Pflueger designing a new wing on the Pine Street side.

=== Movie palaces ===
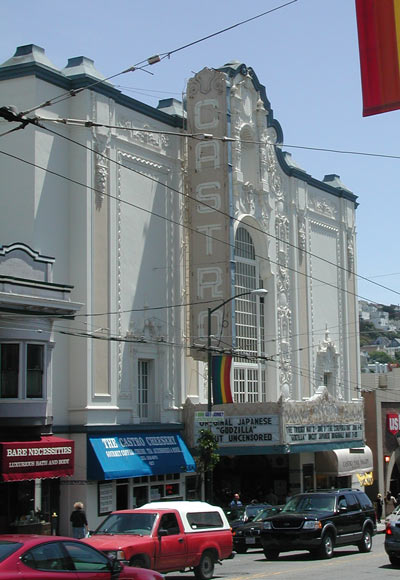
The Castro Theatre is San Francisco Landmark No. 100.

The three Nasser brothers, William, Elias and George, specifically requested Pflueger in 1920 after they received financing for a grand movie palace on Castro Street. In a hurry to see the 2,000-seat project completed, the Nasser Brothers gave Pflueger a free hand in its design. The Castro Theatre was finished in June 1922 for $300,000 ($5,770,000 in today's dollars) in a largely Spanish Baroque style which evoked cathedrals in Spain and Mexico. Churrigueresque elements were used sparingly on the facade, and ornate tile detailing was employed in the vestibule, ticket booth and the lobby. A canopy modeled after ancient Roman silk brocade shelters was fashioned of steel lath and plaster and painted with Asian and Buddha figures to overhang the main theater seating area. The whole was an eclectic assemblage of styles.

In 1925, Michael Naify and William Nasser turned to Pflueger again for a new neighborhood theater design based on the Alhambra in Grenada, Spain. The Alhambra Theatre opened on November 5, 1926 with a grand facade flanked by twin minarets that glowed red at night. Pflueger's vision stayed firmly planted in the Moorish Revival style, complete to the iron scrollwork and amber shade redesign of two municipal streetlamps standing outside of the theater. Pflueger worked with muralist Arthur Frank Mathews to achieve a rich palette of color most prominently displayed in a geometric floral pattern on the main ceiling. The Alhambra was named San Francisco Landmark No. 217 in 1996.

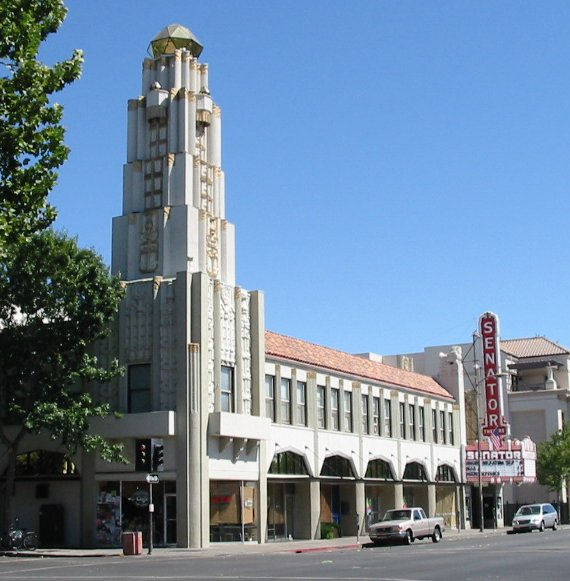
The Senator Theatre in Chico, California includes a prominent tower at the street corner.

The Nassers and Naify contracted with Pflueger in early 1926 to build three large movie theaters in central California cities. They assigned Pflueger the design of the Tulare Theatre (1927) in Tulare, the Senator Theatre (1928) in Chico and the State Theatre (1928) in Oroville. The $250,000 Tulare Theatre (now demolished) featured motifs based on the Ishtar Gate of Babylon. Pflueger included zigzag patterns in the twin-towered facade trimmed in neon accents, and brought Streamline Moderne stylings to the interior via sweeping curves in steel banister railings as well as Mayan touches in the stepped mirrors. The $250,000 State Theatre appeared Spanish Colonial with its tiled roof and concrete bas-relief exterior, but turned to Streamline Moderne in a 1,529-seat interior that featured chrome railings, plush carpet and indirect lighting. Aztec elements were incorporated in the proscenium design. The $300,000 Senator Theatre was delayed in construction by the discovery of running water under the foundation, a condition that required channelization and pumps. The movie palace's eclectic theme was largely Egyptian with Moorish, Asian and Aztec details dominated by a landmark tower topped by a giant faceted amber glass gem lit from within.

Back in San Francisco, Pflueger designed the Nasser Brothers' 1,830-seat El Rey Theatre (1931) at 1970 Ocean Avenue in pure Moderne style, including a sleek tower topped by an aircraft warning beacon. A mirrored foyer in black and gold held floral and geometric accents, and twin curved stairways to the balcony flanked the foyer.

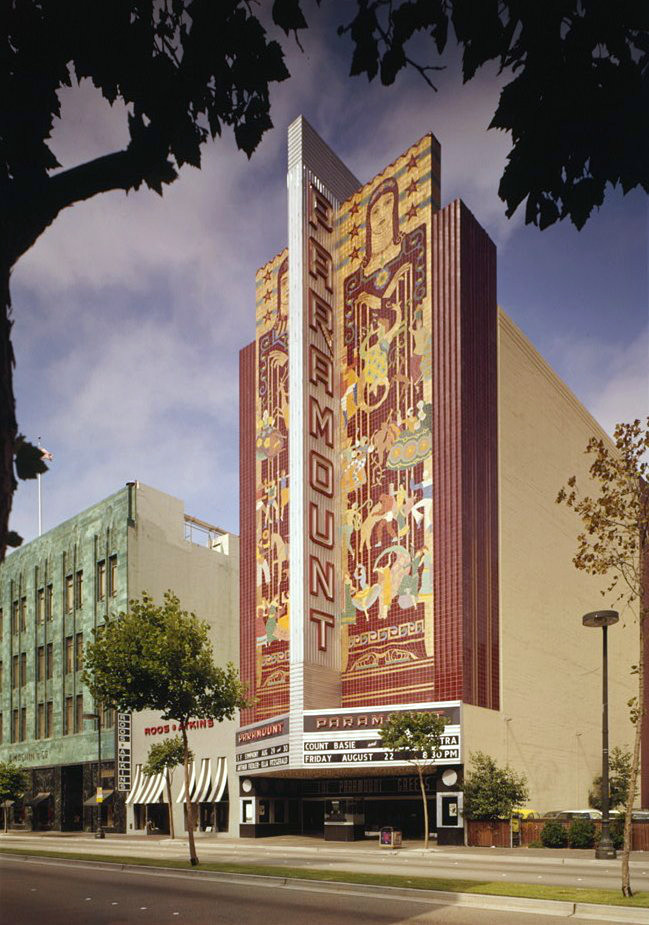
Oakland's Paramount Theatre showing the perpendicular blade and flanking terra cotta mosaic figures

Shortly before the Wall Street Crash of 1929, investors including William Henry Crocker bought adjoining parcels of land in Oakland for the purpose of erecting a movie palace to rival the nearby Fox Orpheum, intending that Miller and Pflueger build it. One of the largest studio and theater chains in the country, Paramount Publix, showed great interest, but wanted to use their own East Coast architect instead. Pflueger went to New York and convinced Paramount Publix to use his firm by demonstrating that past projects of his had stayed within budget, a concern of increasing importance in the cautious financial climate of early 1930.

For the 3,200-seat design, Pflueger took his inspiration from Green Mansions, a romantic fantasy novel by William Henry Hudson set in the Guyana jungle of Venezuela. Tropical rain forest motifs were used throughout the theater, including climbing vines, waterfalls, parrots and emerald green lighting. As with his other works, Pflueger mixed together sources from around the world, adding images of Greek and Egyptian gods and goddesses as well as Egyptian lotuses to the primarily jungle theme. Plans were complete in November and in December 1930 ground was broken in a ceremony that called for "prosperity celebration".

The grand opening was held December 16, 1931 with a crowd which extended out to the street. Live action variety performances alternated with film showings. Unfortunately for the theater, the number of tickets sold in the subsequent months was not enough to keep the theater in the black. It closed in June 1932, reopening in 1933 as only a movie theater, devoid of the extravagant live pieces.

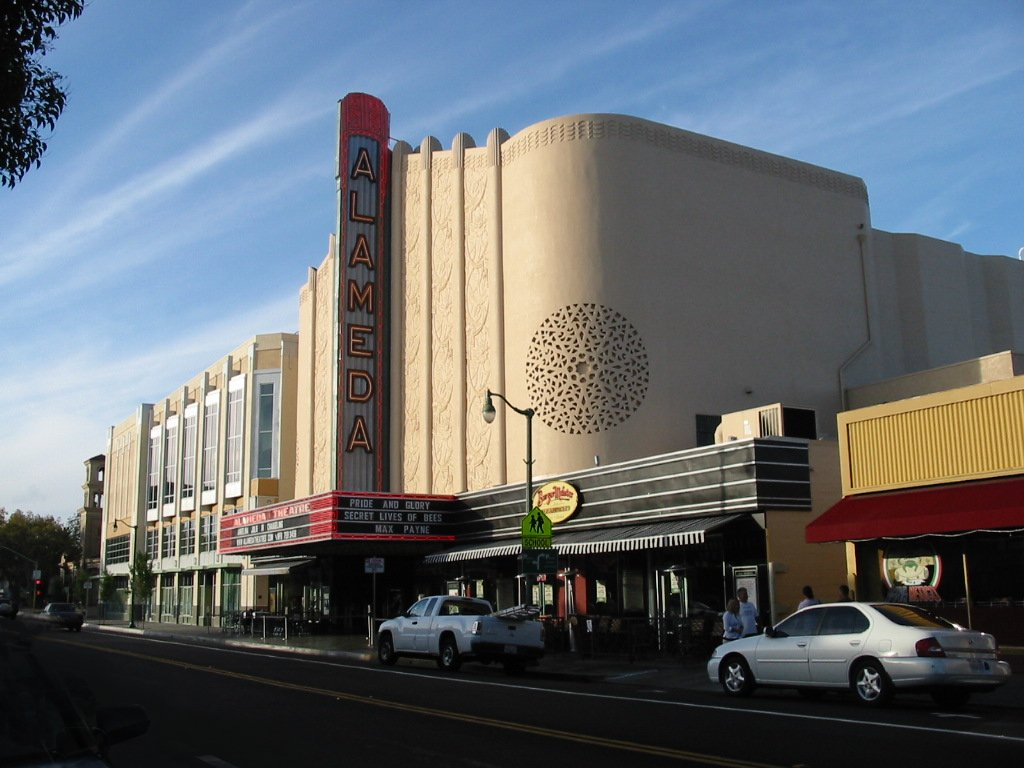
The Alameda Theatre, restored in 2008

Increasingly tough economic times in the early 1930s caused many theater owners to cancel plans for new construction and concentrate on attracting customers to existing theaters. Only one more cinema, the 2,168-seat Alameda Theatre (1932) in Alameda, California would ever be built by Pflueger. Commissioned by the Nasser Brothers, the eclectic Alameda's exterior incorporated deeply incised and intricate Moorish Revival rosettes on cream-colored smoothly curved sides on either side of Art Nouveau flowers in bas relief rising between eight vertical Moderne speed lines. The Art Deco interior design used imitation silver and gold leaf for accents and warm colors for a stylized mezzanine mural with a hint of Cubism. In the interest of economy, the Alameda's floor plan was nearly identical to that of the El Rey Theatre, including twin curved staircases, and some floral and geometric elements were borrowed from the Paramount.

== 1930s ==
During the Great Depression, Pflueger continued to win commissions, but because of the straitened financial climate, the most noteworthy examples were no longer prominent downtown skyscrapers. Pflueger designed a handful of unique schools for San Francisco Unified School District, including two elementary schools, a junior high, two high schools and every major building on the first campus (Ocean campus) of San Francisco Junior College, an institution that would later expand to become City College of San Francisco.

In 1932, Pflueger renovated the Nasser brother's New Mission Theater, bringing Art Deco stylings to the lobby in contrast to the Spanish Mission trimmings in the main auditorium. In 1993, the theater closed. The theater, now designated San Francisco Landmark No. 245, was purchased by Alamo Drafthouse Cinemas and completely renovated to its original splendor, opening its doors once again to patrons in December 2015. Pflueger simultaneously worked on the remodeling of the Nasser's New Fillmore Theater, a sister design similar in many respects. The New Fillmore closed in 1957 and was demolished to make way for an urban redevelopment project.

=== Cocktail lounges ===
During Prohibition, Pflueger designed bars for private clubs such as the Stock Exchange Luncheon Club where members kept their personal bottles in small lockers behind the bar, and two bars for The Family, one at the Family Farm in Woodside and one at the clubhouse in San Francisco. Pflueger created a cocktail bar and nightclub for Frank Martinelli and Tom Gerun in 1931, the Bal Tabarin, featuring a stage for live music and colorful indirect lighting from above metal fins in the ceiling and behind curved metal strips upstage. When Prohibition ended in December 1933, Bal Tabarin received an immediate renovation by Pflueger along with a liquor license from the state. Pflueger was then asked to design cocktail lounges for several hotels, completing the Cirque for the Fairmont Hotel in 1935, adorned with finely painted murals by Esther Bruton, and in 1939, both the Patent Leather Bar for the St. Francis Hotel and the Top of the Mark for the Mark Hopkins Hotel. The Patent Leather Bar used a metal-finned ceiling much like that which Pflueger had installed above the audience at the Paramount Theatre in Oakland. A padded, serpentine bar snaked through the room's mirror, chrome and black leather decor. Ansel Adams was retained by C. Templeton Crocker to show off the new cocktail lounge in photographs.

=== Bay Bridge ===
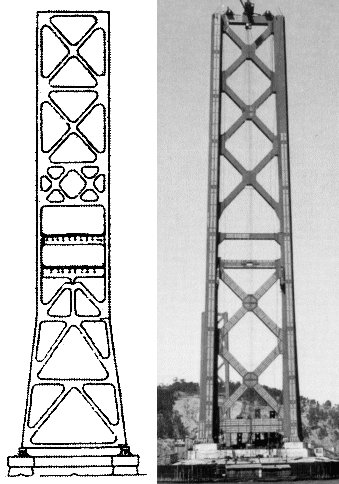
Comparison of a 1930 civil engineering sketch of a Bay Bridge suspension tower and a 1935 construction photo of the architectural committee's design as built

Pflueger was invited by California governor James "Sunny Jim" Rolph to chair the committee of architects who were given nominal oversight of the San Francisco–Oakland Bay Bridge project. Arriving two years into the design phase of the bridge, Pflueger was stymied at every turn by civil engineers citing the inflexible budget in his attempts to bring a more artistic theme to the bridge. A heroic figure of a giant man standing at the central anchorage between the two main suspension spans was suggested and quickly canceled; all that remains of the proposal is a 14-inch study modeled by Ralph Stackpole. The committee of architects succeeded mainly in making the suspension bridge towers more streamlined in appearance by getting rid of the civil engineer's plans for a greater number of horizontal cross members. Pflueger very likely designed the stepped semicircular tunnel entrance and exit portals and, by mounting a campaign of public pressure, prevented the bridge from being painted black, successfully substituting a silvery aluminum-based paint instead. When the bridge was completed, Pflueger designed the Transbay Terminal, the main transit center for the railroad train tracks on the south half of the lower deck of the Bay Bridge, that carried the electric commuter trains of the Southern Pacific, the Key System, and the Sacramento Northern Railroad.

=== Golden Gate International Exposition ===
For the Golden Gate International Exposition of 1939–1940 on Treasure Island, Pflueger joined a committee of well-known Beaux-Arts architects and was frustrated in establishing a more modern design scheme, though his own Federal Building amply demonstrated the new direction he espoused. Pflueger's contributions were among the few buildings at the Exposition that received positive reviews. When the Exposition's investors failed to turn a profit in 1939, they decided to extend the fair another year. For the summer of 1940, Pflueger put together a large exhibit of Art in Action, showing a number of artists on display, engaged in creating works. Alfred Frankenstein of The New York Times visited in June and wrote "Here the visitor is privileged to observe a kind of twenty-ring circus of art... On the floor, in a series of little ateliers, sculptors, painters, lithographers, etchers, ceramicists, weavers and whatnot are at work under the direct observation of the public." Pflueger once again brought Diego Rivera to San Francisco, this time to serve as the main attraction at "Art in Action". Rivera painted Pan American Unity on ten steel-framed panels spanning 74 feet in width and reaching 22 feet in height. For the second time, Rivera included Pflueger in a mural of his. Some 68 artists had participated by the end of September when the Exposition was closed. Rivera was not finished, however; he and two assistants labored for two more months in the empty exposition hall. On November 30 and December 2, 30,000–35,000 visitors came to Treasure Island to view the completed mural.

== 1940s ==
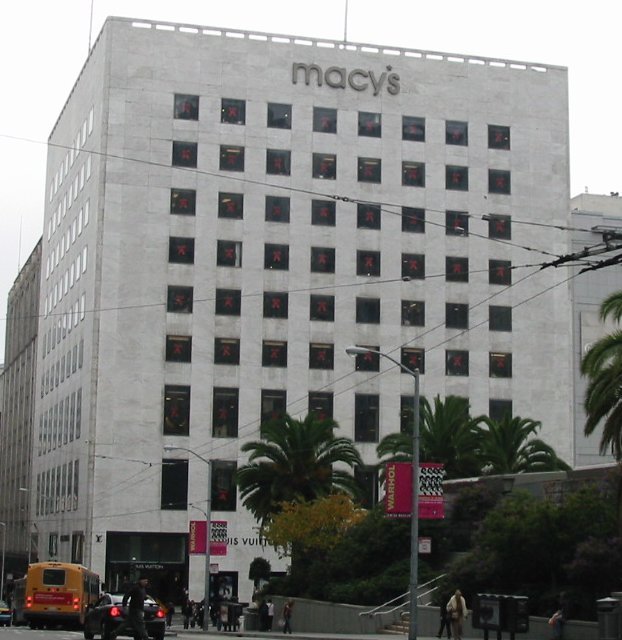
The Macy's complex at Union Square includes this building which was once I. Magnin's flagship location. The flat face of white stone and plate glass, an example of International style, was Pflueger's final work, completed in 1948.

In 1938, Pflueger sailed to Paris with Grover Magnin, head of the I. Magnin department store chain, aboard RMS Queen Mary. The two men investigated French shopping ideas that could be brought back and used at American department stores. Pflueger gained ideas from the ship's famous Art Deco adornments. Magnin and Pflueger went to Venice and Milan as well, but found very little of use to them on their short European trip. The $3 million I. Magnin store on Wilshire (currently the Wilshire Galleria) opened in Los Angeles on February 10, 1939, with an interior completely devoted to Pflueger's concept of luxuriously separate boutique spaces within which individual sales items would receive unique attention. Pflueger's interior was attuned to women's fashions: the ground level floor was laid with rose-beige marble from France, pink velvet counter tops held gloves for trying on, rose-beige leather panels covered the walls of the shoe salon and the same leather served as covering for sofas and chairs that were provided by Neel D. Parker, interior designer and Pflueger's fellow club member from The Family. Grover Magnin continued to work with Pflueger on three more stores into the 1940s.

In 1939, plans for an underground garage at Union Square were given to Pflueger for political reasons. George Applegarth's 1935 design was actively opposed from several directions and Pflueger's social contacts and his friendship with mayor Angelo Joseph Rossi were needed to get the project moving. Union Square garage opened in 1943 with Pflueger's touch making it a full-service valet garage complete with a waiting room and rest rooms for shoppers and the option of having shopping packages sent directly from a nearby store to the garage or for the car to be delivered to the store. The concept of an underground garage below a city park was influential: New York builder Robert Moses requested copies of Pflueger's plans (little changed from Applegarth's) and Pershing Square in Los Angeles was excavated and rebuilt in 1952 along the same lines.

In 1942, while America geared up for front line involvement in World War II, Pflueger received fewer assignments than he had been seeing previously. Grover Magnin kept a flow of work with I. Magnin designs, and Pflueger also helped the Army with a depot building in Ogden, Utah. He began to draw up plans for a 12-story cross-shaped medical teaching hospital for the University of California, San Francisco (eventually to be built at 505 Parnassus in 1955 with additional design work performed by his brother Milton Pflueger). His firm accepted a commission to excavate below the Mark Hopkins Hotel in order to create a bomb-resistant radio transmission center for AM station KSFO and shortwave programs of the Voice of America. This space became the hotel's underground parking garage after the war.

== Death and legacy ==
Timothy L. Pflueger died suddenly at the age of 54 on November 20, 1946, of a heart attack on Post Street outside of the Olympic Club after taking his usual evening swim. At his death, Pflueger was not finished with the radical interior and exterior transformation of the I. Magnin flagship store at Union Square, a sleek International design that remained influential for years afterward.

All his adult life, Pflueger maintained his residence at his childhood home on Guerrero Street. When entertaining downtown late into the evening, he was known to spend an occasional night at the Olympic Club. Pflueger drove a green Cadillac convertible and was often seen with his steady lady friend on his arm. Pflueger never married and left no children. His brother Milton, fifteen years younger, had been working with the firm since the 1930s and, at Tim's death, Milton reorganized and headed the company, doing business as Milton T. Pflueger, Architect.

In 1990, a bas-relief of influential San Franciscans was sculpted over the facade of 235 Pine Street, a 26-story skyscraper. Timothy L. Pflueger was the only architect among those memorialized. In 2008, the San Francisco Board of Supervisors voted unanimously to change the name of Chelsea Place, a small alley leading to the garage of the 450 Sutter Street building, to Timothy Pflueger Place.

== See also ==
- Arthur Brown, Jr.
- Clarence W. W. Mayhew
- Sargent Claude Johnson
- William Wurster
