= James Rupert Miller =

American architect

- Born: June 27, 1869; New Brunswick, Canada
- Died: August 23, 1946 (aged 77)
- Occupation: Architect
- Practice: Miller and De Colmesnil; Miller and Pflueger
- Buildings: Pacific Exchange Paramount Theatre; Castro Theater; Pacific Telephone & Telegraph Company Building 450 Sutter Street

James Rupert Miller (June 27, 1869 – August 23, 1946) was an architect active in San Francisco, California in the first half of the 20th century. Miller gained prominence after the 1906 San Francisco earthquake when his firm was one among many called upon to rebuild the stricken city.

After serving apprentice and draftsman to several prominent San Francisco architects in the late 19th century, Miller formed his own firm in 1902. Miller joined two prestigious social clubs: the Corinthian Yacht Club of Tiburon and The Family. In 1906, Miller partnered with George T. De Colmesnil to better tackle the many reconstruction tasks at hand. Miller and Colmesnil designed the Corinthian Yacht Club's Colonial Revival clubhouse in 1912. Together, they rebuilt the City of Paris department store in 1909.

Miller and Colmesnil hired teenaged Timothy L. Pflueger in 1907 to help as a draftsman in the office. Miller saw promise in Pflueger and gave him his first assignment: Our Lady of the Wayside Church in 1912. Colmesnil left the partnership in 1913.

Miller continued on his own, with Pflueger on staff. The Metropolitan Life Insurance Company became an important client, with near-continuous expansion of their Neoclassic 600 Stockton Street location in San Francisco from 1914 through 1919 (the building now houses a Ritz-Carlton hotel.) In 1923, after working full-time on the Castro Theatre project, Pflueger was given full partnership with Miller.

Miller moved to Burlingame in the 1920s with his wife Florence G. Miller. Miller retired in 1937 at age 68.
