= Our Lady of the Wayside =

Our Lady of the Wayside refers to the patron saint of travelers, the Blessed Virgin Mary of the Catholic Church. Churches and schools may carry the name. Examples include:

- Our Lady of the Wayside Church (1912) in Portola Valley, California
- Our Lady of the Wayside, a church in Chaptico, Maryland, part of the Roman Catholic Archdiocese of Washington, D.C.
- Our Lady of the Wayside, a church and school in Arlington Heights, Illinois part of the Roman Catholic Archdiocese of Chicago
- Chapel of Our Lady of the Wayside, Millwood, New York, part of the Roman Catholic Archdiocese of New York
- Our Lady of the Wayside School, Arlington Heights, Illinois, part of the Roman Catholic Archdiocese of Chicago
- Church of Our Lady of the Wayside (1937), known locally in Kilternan, Ireland as "The Blue Church"
- Our Lady of the Wayside, a church in Bluebell, Dublin, a suburban town in Ireland
- Our Lady of the Wayside N.S., a school in Bluebell, Dublin.
- Our Lady of the Wayside, church and primary school in Shirley, Solihull, West Midlands, England
- Our Lady of the Wayside Mt Pleasant Parish in Archdiocese of Harare, Zimbabwe
