= Charles Stafford Duncan =

American painter

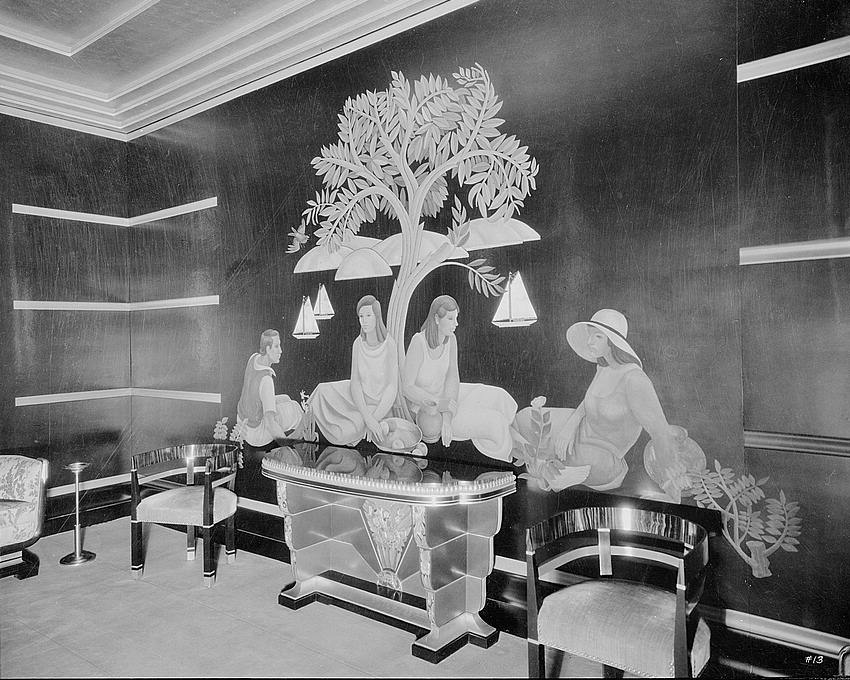
- Paramount Theatre (Oakland, California). Women's Smoking Lounge with mural by Charles Stafford Duncan
- Born: December 12, 1892; Hutchinson, Kansas
- Died: June 7, 1952 (aged 59); New York City
- Education: California School of Fine Arts (CSFA)
- Known for: Painting portraits and murals
- Movement: Modernism
- Spouse: Dorothy G. Johnson (m. 1920–1952; death)

Charles Stafford Duncan (1892–1952) was a San Francisco painter and lithographer perhaps best known for his mural in the Paramount Theatre in Oakland, California. He won the Benjamin Altman Prize from the National Academy of Design in 1937.

== Biography ==
Duncan was born in Hutchinson, Kansas on December 12, 1892. At age four he moved with his family to San Francisco. He studied at the California School of Fine Arts (CSFA) under Maynard Dixon and Ralph Stackpole. Early in his career, Charles Stafford Duncan worked at the advertising firm Foster & Kleiser under another Charles Duncan. This has caused some researchers to confuse them with one another. His painting style was modernist, and was affiliated with other left-leaning, bohemian San Francisco artists who gathered around Diego Rivera, including Otis Oldfield and Ralph Stackpole.

In 1931 Charles Stafford Duncan worked with architecture firm Miller and Pflueger (under the supervision of architect Timothy L. Pflueger and artistic director Theodore C. Bernardi) on the art deco Paramount Theatre (Oakland, California). He created the murals for the basement women's smoking lounge.

He was a resident of San Francisco until 1945, when he moved to Sausalito, California.

He died in New York City on June 7, 1952, at age 59 after returning from a trip to Paris. He was survived by his wife, artist Dorothy Johnson Duncan and his daughter Jane.

== Work ==
=== Notable exhibitions ===
- San Francisco Art Association (SFAA), 1924-39 (medals & prizes);
- Beaux Arts Gallery (San Francisco), 1927, 1928;
- Bohemian Club, 1927, 1928 (prize);
- Pennsylvania Academy of the Fine Arts (PAFA), 1928, 1930;
- Pacific Southwest Exposition (Long Beach), 1928 (gold medal);
- Detroit Institute of Art, 1929;
- California Palace of the Legion of Honor (CPLH), 1930 (prize);
- Los Angeles County Museum of Art (LACMA), 1932;
- California Palace of Fine Arts, 1932;
- Whitney Museum (New York),1933;
- Painting and Sculpture from 16 American Cities, Museum of Modern Art (MoMA), New York City, 1933–1934;
- de Young Museum, 1935;
- California Pacific International Exposition, 1935;
- San Francisco Museum of Art (now called San Francisco Museum of Modern Art or SFMoMA), 1935, 1938 (solo), 1950, 1952;
- National Academy of Design (NAD), 1937 (prize),
- Golden Gate International Exposition (GGIE), 1939;
- Seattle Museum, 1940

=== Memberships ===
- San Francisco Art Association (SFAA);
- California Society of Etchers;
- Bohemian Club
