= Miller and Pflueger =

Practice information
- Key architects: James Rupert Miller; Timothy L. Pflueger
- Founded: 1923
- Dissolved: 1937
- Location: San Francisco

Significant works and honors
- Buildings: Pacific Telephone & Telegraph Company Building 450 Sutter Street; 100 McAllister; Castro Theater; Pacific Exchange; Paramount Theatre; Transbay Terminal; Roosevelt Middle School George Washington High School

Miller and Pflueger was an architectural firm that formed when James Rupert Miller named Timothy L. Pflueger partner. Pflueger, at the time a rising star of San Francisco's architect community, had begun his architectural career with architecture firm, Miller and Colmesnil sometime in 1907, under the tutelage of James Rupert Miller. Together, Miller and Pflueger designed a number of significant buildings in San Francisco, including the Pacific Telephone & Telegraph Company Building which was the city's tallest skyscraper for four decades.

Architects that worked with the firm include Theodore C. Bernardi, Milton T. Pflueger and Clarence William Whitehead Mayhew.

The architectural works featured artistic highlights (such as murals, bas-relief, sculpture) by challenging, new artists and craftsmen such as Ralph Stackpole, Robert Boardman Howard, Charles Stafford Duncan, Dorothy Wright Liebes, Diego Rivera. Rather than breaking new ground with designs, they captured the spirit of the times and refined it, adding a distinct personal flair.

Miller retired in 1937; Pflueger reformed the business as Timothy L. Pflueger and Associates.

== Projects ==
- 1915 – New Mission Theatre, (San Francisco)
- 1923 – Mining Exchange, (San Francisco)
- 1925 – American Telephone and Telegraph (AT&T) Company Office Building at 134-140 New Montgomery Street, (San Francisco)
- 1925 – Alhambra Theatre, (San Francisco)
- 1926 – Shattuck Square (Berkeley, CA)
- 1928 – Tulare Theatre, (Tulare, CA)
- 1928 – State Theatre, (Oroville, CA)
- 1929 – Medical-Dental Office Building at 450 Sutter Street, (San Francisco)
- 1929 – Senator Theatre, (Chico, CA)
- 1930 – Pacific Coast Stock Exchange Club, (San Francisco)
- 1930 – Pacific Coast Stock Exchange, (San Francisco)
- 1931 – El Rey Theatre, (San Francisco)
- 1931 – Paramount Theatre, (Oakland)
- 1932 – Alhambra Theatre, (San Francisco)
- 1932 – Alameda Theatre, (Alameda, CA)
- 1935 – Cirque Room at the Fairmont Hotel, (San Francisco)
