= The Family (club) =

Private all-male club in San Francisco, California

Coordinates: 37°47′23.6″N 122°24′32.5″W

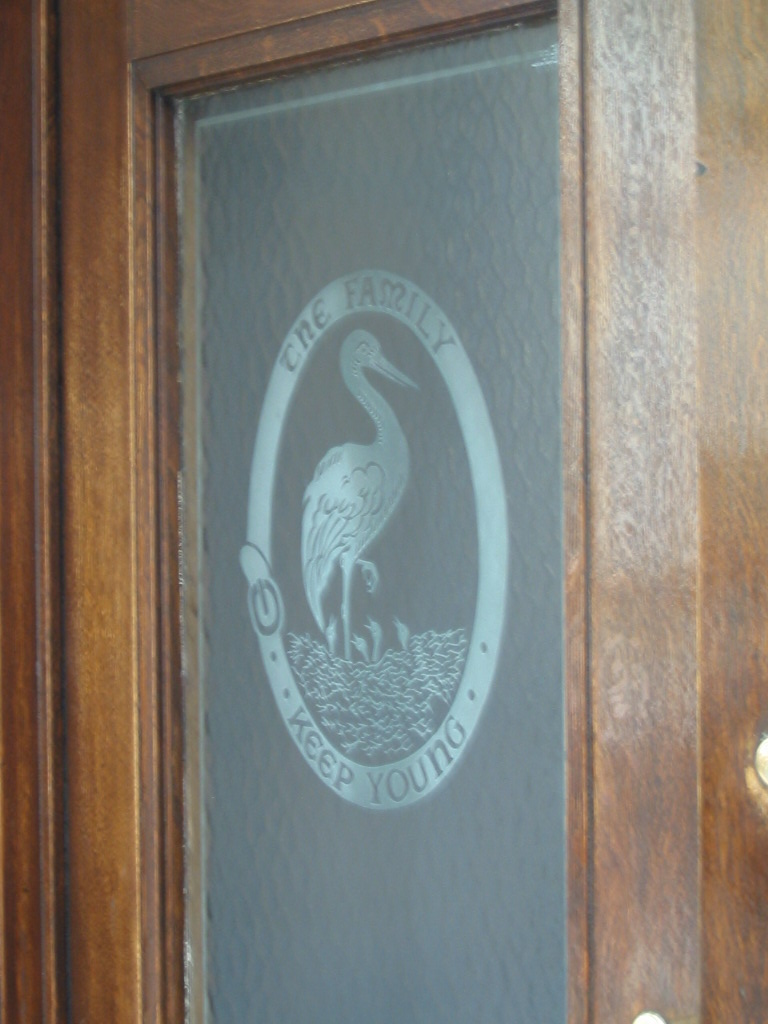
- Entrance to 545 Powell, San Francisco, showing a design etched in glass: a large bird and its four babies in a nest, surrounded by a buckled belt that reads "The Family · · Keep Young · ·"
- Formation: 1901; 125 years ago
- Type: Private Men's Social Club
- Locations: San Francisco, California; Woodside, California

The Family is a private club in San Francisco, California, formed in 1902 by newspapermen who in protest, left the Bohemian Club due to censorship. It maintains a clubhouse in San Francisco, as well as rural property 35 miles to the south in Woodside. It is an exclusive, invitation-only, all-male club where new members are referred to as "Babies", regular members as "Children" and the club president as the "Father".

== About ==
The Family conducts periodic social events among the redwood and oak trees and open meadows at its rural property on the San Francisco peninsula. The Family Farm entrance is along Portola Road in Woodside.

Among other charitable activities, The Family sponsors a hospital in Guatemala along with volunteer participation from many members. Club rules forbid the use of its facilities or services for the purposes of trade or business. Each member must certify that he will not deduct any part of club payments as business expenses for federal or state income tax purposes. This practice allows for membership to step away from business entirely and instead pursue friendships and the arts.

== History ==
=== The Family Club ===
The Family Club was formed in 1901 after Ambrose Bierce wrote a poem that seemed to predict President William McKinley's death by an assassin's bullet. The Hearst chain of newspapers including the San Francisco Examiner and others owned by William Randolph Hearst published the poem, and some of the Bohemian Club members took offense. When McKinley was assassinated shortly thereafter, opponents of Hearst created a fervor over the poem's publication and banned Hearst newspapers from the premises. A group of 14 reporters, editors, and other Hearst newsmen, in the spirit of true Bohemians and asserting freedom of the press, resigned in protest to the censorship, formed their own club, and called it The Family.

Early public activities by the club included the sponsoring of a horse race called the Family Club Handicap held in Oakland in 1904. A racehorse named Fossil took first place, receiving a silver cup from the Family as well as US$1,000 from the California Jockey Club.

The Family clubhouse was originally located at 228 Post Street, but the building was lost two days after the 1906 San Francisco earthquake in the subsequent calamitous fire, though not before serving as a temporary rest station and meal place for earthquake victims such as the bereft Conreid Metropolitan Opera Company. The club rebuilt at the corner of Powell and Bush Streets, and still conducts meetings at this site two blocks from the peak of Nob Hill.

The Family's clubhouse has been a venue for musical events, such as an annual benefit for San Francisco Sinfonietta, and for black-tie dinner lectures by various experts and personages, such as Stanlee Gatti speaking to benefit horticultural programs, and Charles M. Schulz appearing to promote the Cartoon Art Museum.

=== The Family Farm ===
In 1909, Family club members decided upon the Woodside location for their rural getaways. While summering there in 1912, club members of a variety of religious backgrounds including Judaism, Protestantism and Catholicism pooled their resources to build a Catholic church in nearby Portola Valley: Our Lady of the Wayside Church. Architect member James R. Miller assigned the design of the church to a promising young draftsman at his firm, Timothy L. Pflueger. This was Pflueger's first architectural commission, and was the start of his interaction with The Family. Pflueger would soon join The Family to become a member in good standing, and ultimately designed "The Tavern" at the Family Farm as an indoor performance venue, and a new interior for the City Home clubhouse, both being still in use today.

The annual "Flight Play", as well as a number of other stage and musical performances, are written and performed by club members. Plays aren't published or performed outside of the club, and all original written materials are retained as the sole property of the club. One handwritten musical score, Thine Enemy, composed by Meredith Willson for the 1937 Flight Play 20 years before The Music Man was staged on Broadway, will be donated by The Family to a museum in the composer's birthplace, Mason City, Iowa.

Artists Diego Rivera and José Clemente Orozco were guests of architect Timothy Pflueger's at The Family Farm in 1930. The two leftist Mexican muralists argued forcefully with one another about art during one visit.

== Notable members ==
- General of the Army and General of the Air Force Henry "Hap" Arnold
- Edward Bowes, realtor
- Ty Cobb, famous baseball player
- Colbert Coldwell, founder of Coldwell Banker
- Henry J. Crocker, nephew of Charles Crocker, banker, oil magnate, 1903 mayoral candidate, member of the Committee of Fifty (1906)
- Peter Detkin, famous Intellectual Property investor
- Arthur Fiedler, conductor
- Herbert Fleishhacker, businessman, civic leader, philanthropist
- John Emmett Gerrity, California modernist artist
- Henry F. Grady, First US Ambassador to India; Dean of the Commerce department at the University of California, Berkeley; President of American President Lines
- Peter E. Haas, Levi-Strauss executive, son of Walter A. Haas
- Major General (ret) Jack L. Hancock
- William Randolph Hearst, newspaper publisher
- Herbert Hoover, President of the United States
- Joseph M. Long, founder of Longs Drugs
- Amadeo Giannini founder of Bank of America
- Clarence W. W. Mayhew, architect
- James Rupert Miller, architect
- General of the Armies John J. Pershing
- Timothy Pflueger, architect
- William Saroyan, author and dramatist
- George Shultz, economist, businessman, diplomat and statesman
- Antonio Sotomayor, artist
- Colonel Charles Stanton, Pershing's Chief of Staff
- George Sterling, poet and playwright
- Max Thelen, senior partner at Thelen LLP
- Henry Albert van Coenen Torchiana, author, Consul-General from the Netherlands and Commissioner of the Panama-Pacific International Exposition
- Meredith Willson, American composer, lyricist, Broadway producer

== See also ==
- List of American gentlemen's clubs
- Olympic Club
- Pacific-Union Club
