= Huntington Park (San Francisco) =

Park in San Francisco, California, US

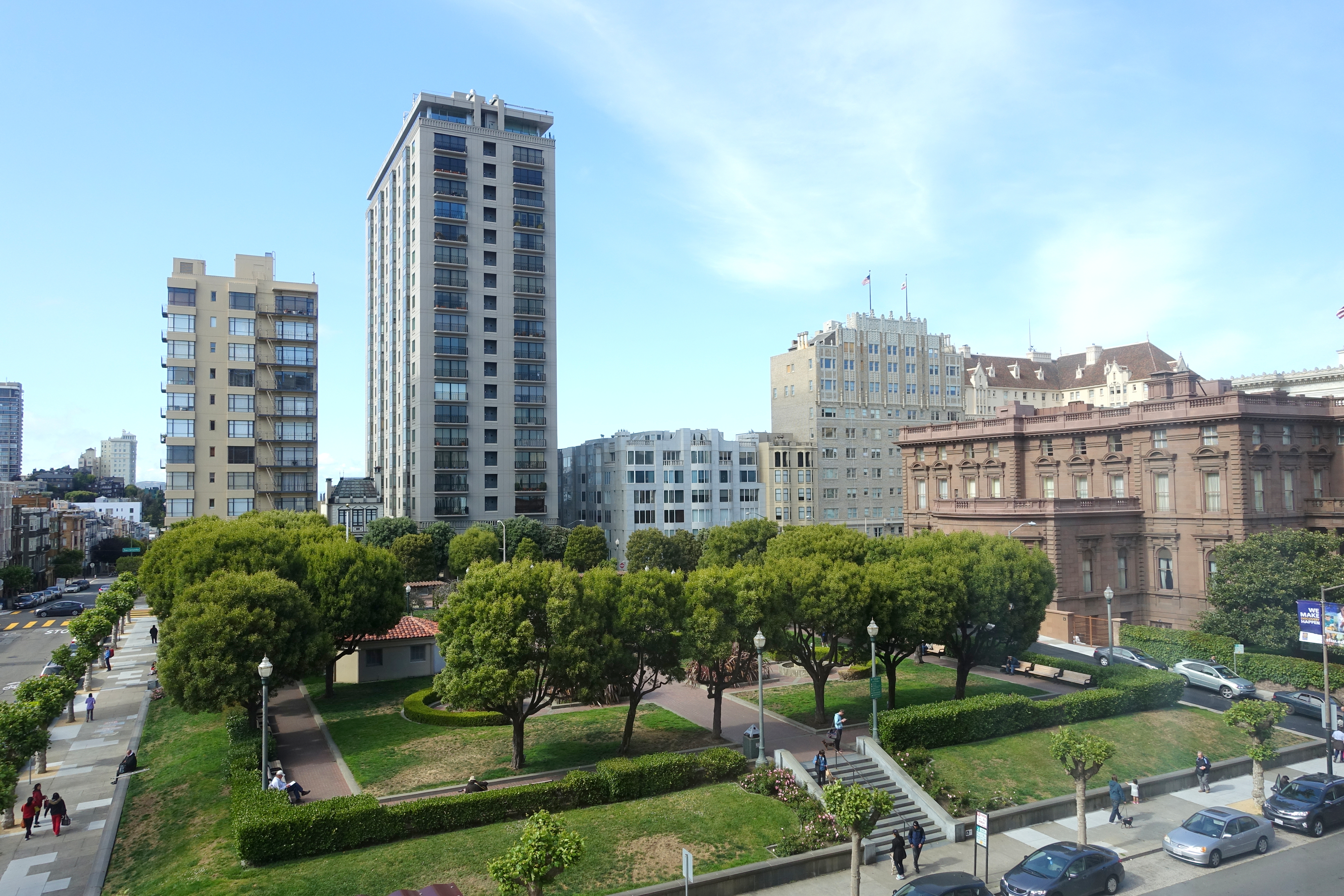
- Huntington Park in 2015, looking northeast
- Interactive map of Huntington Park
- Type: Municipal
- Location: San Francisco, California
- Coordinates: 37.7921779°N 122.412117°W
- Area: 1.3 acres (0.53 ha)
- Created: 1915
- Operator: San Francisco Recreation & Parks Department

Collis P. Huntington Park is a 1.3-acre (0.53 ha) park in the Nob Hill neighborhood of San Francisco, California.

== Location ==
Huntington Park is at 1050 Taylor Street and is bordered by California, Taylor, Sacramento, and Cushman streets, in the Nob Hill neighborhood of San Francisco, California.

== History ==
The park is on land donated to the city in 1915 by Arabella Huntington, widow of railroad tycoon Collis P. Huntington. Their house had stood on the site until it was destroyed in the 1906 earthquake and fire. Some of those made homeless by that catastrophe were for a time housed in tents on the site.

A replica of the Fontana delle Tartarughe was installed in the center of the park in 1955. Originally purchased by Ethel Sperry Crocker for her Hillsborough mansion, the Crocker family donated the fountain to the city in 1954 as part of an estate sale.

== Facilities ==
The city-block-size park contains landscaped areas, a playground, and two fountains.

At one time, dogs were forbidden, so dog owners would walk them at night.

== Gallery ==
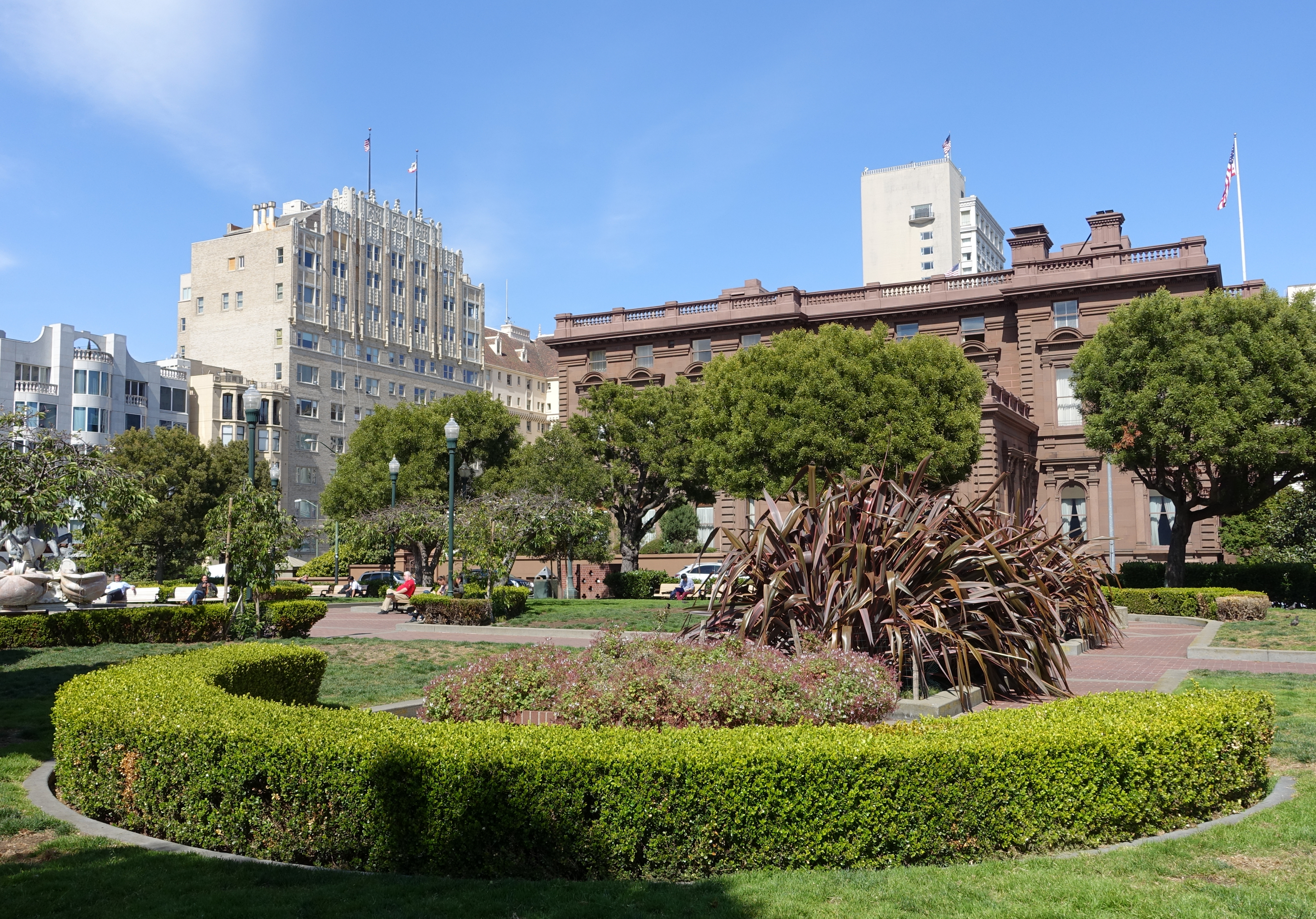
View northeast, including the Pacific-Union Club, 2015

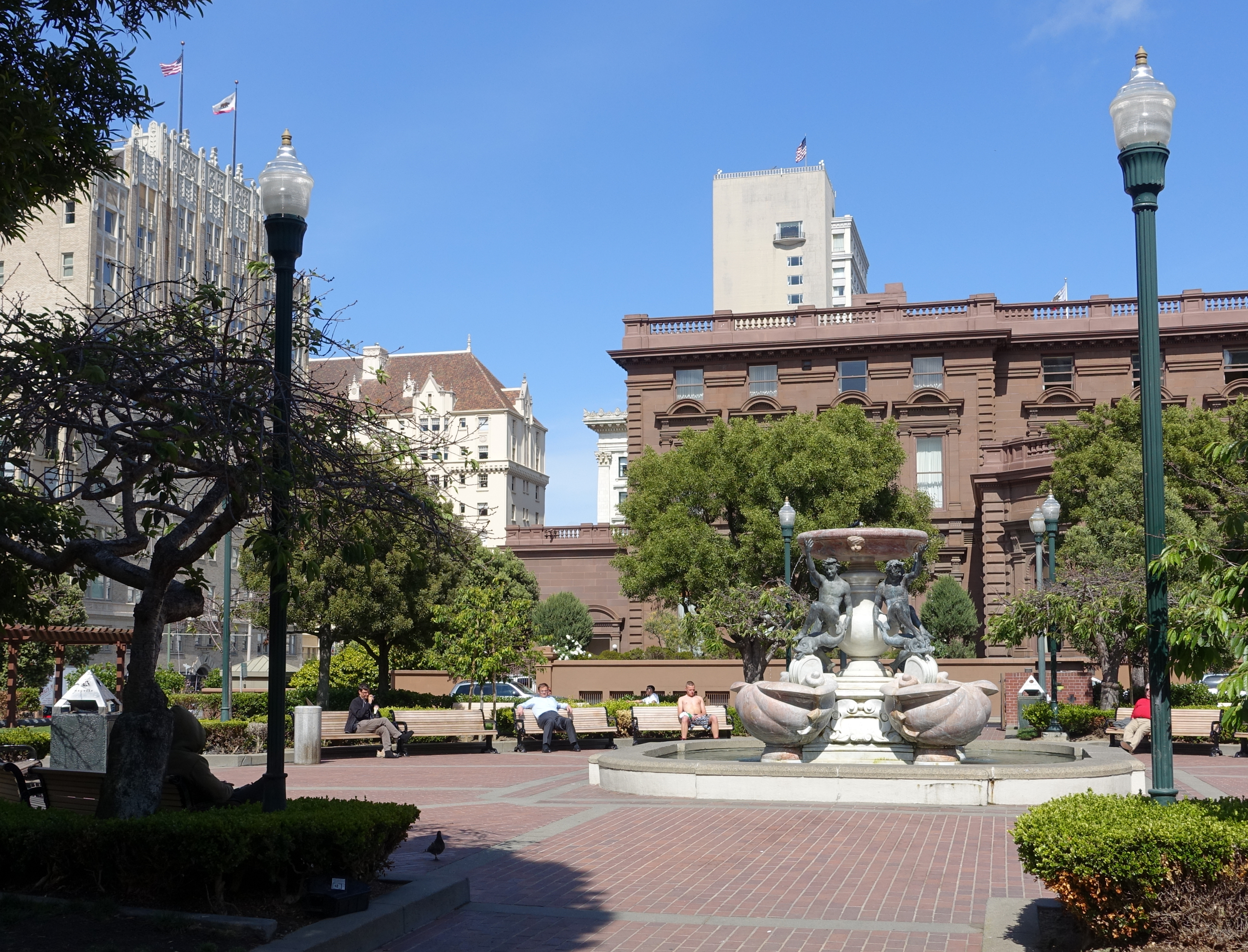
View east, showing fountain and lampposts, 2015

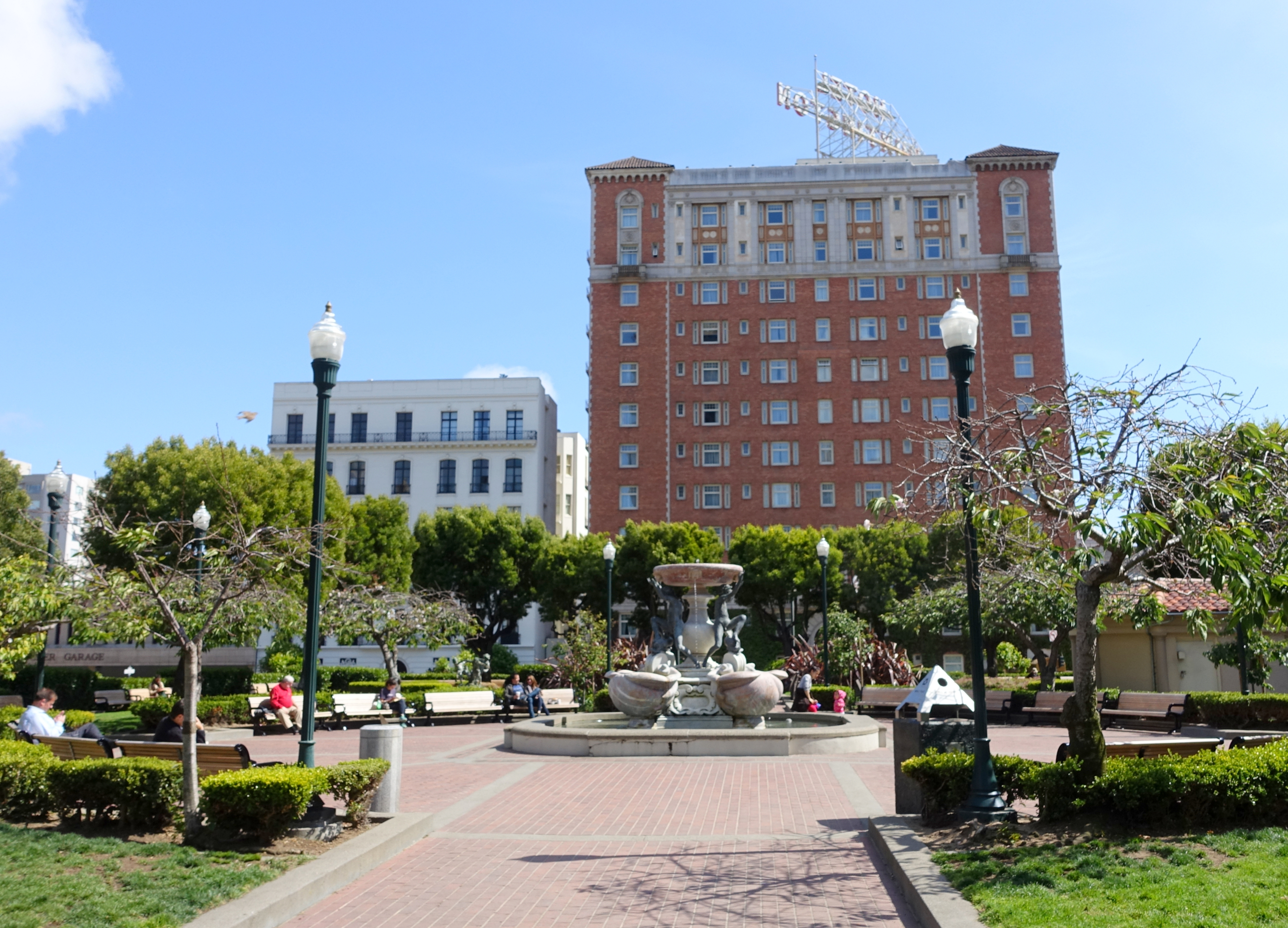
View of the Huntington Hotel, to the south, 2015

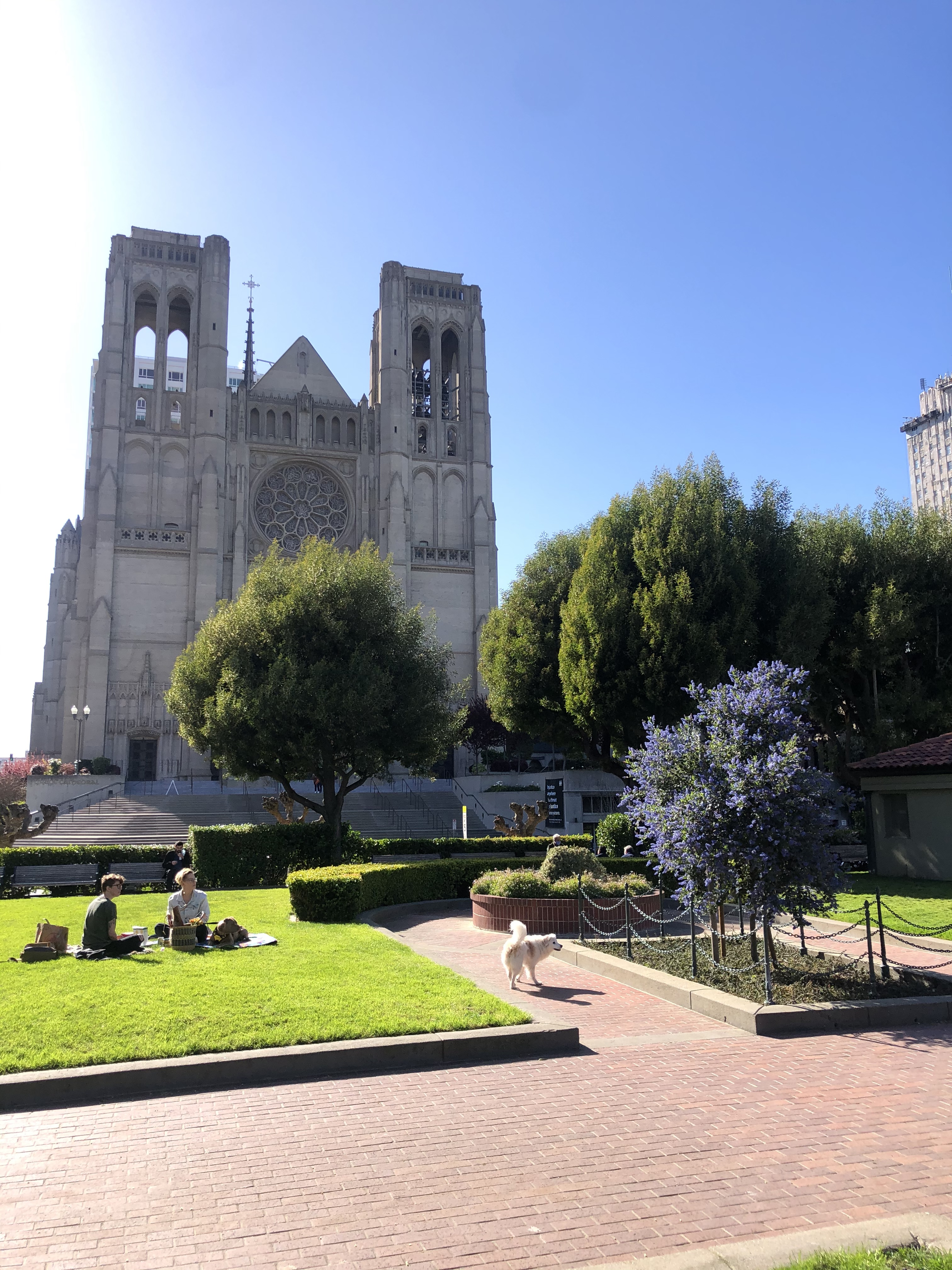
View of Grace Cathedral, west of Huntington Park, 2021

== See also ==
- Top of the Mark
