= Alameda Theatre (Alameda) =

Theatre in Alameda, California

Alameda Theatre & Cineplex
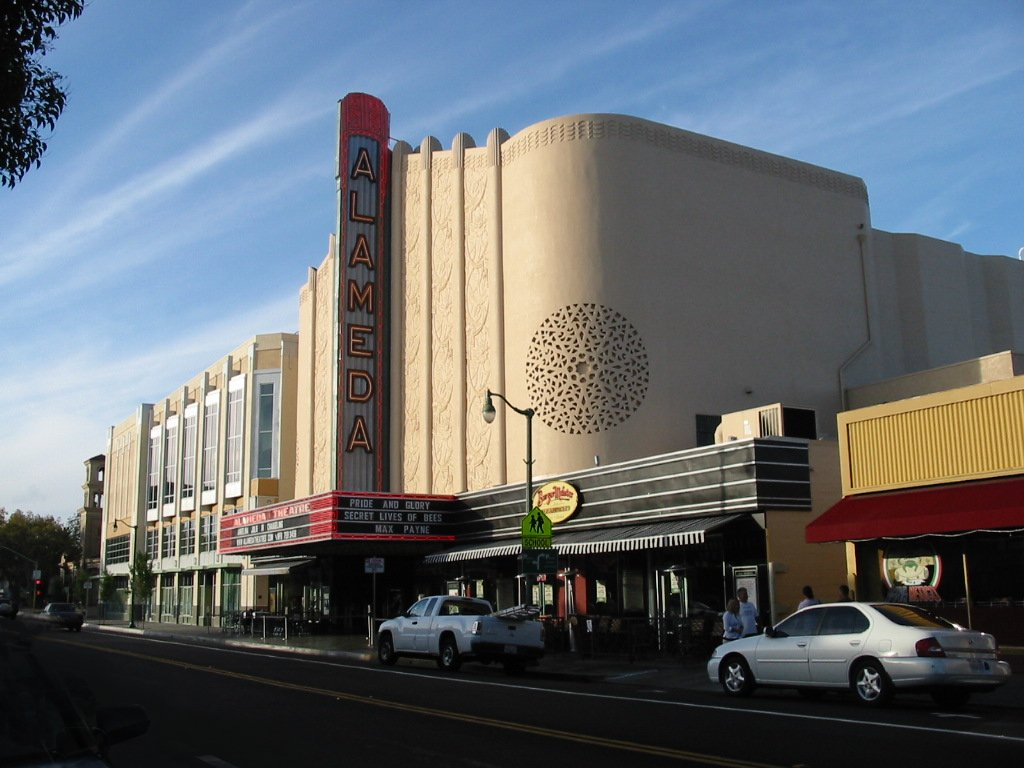
- Historic facade, blade and marquee, with adjoining businesses and multiplex expansion
- Interactive map of Alameda Theatre & Cineplex
- Location: 2317 Central Avenue, Alameda, California, USA
- Coordinates: 37°45′52″N 122°14′36″W
- Seating type: Orchestra, Balcony
- Capacity: 2,168 (1932), 484 (Theater 1, 2008)
- Type: Indoor theatre

Construction
- Built: 1932
- Opened: 1932
- Renovated: 2008
- Expanded: 2008

The Alameda Theatre is an Art Deco movie theatre built in 1932 in Alameda, California. It opened with a seating capacity of 2,168. It was designed by architect Timothy L. Pflueger and was the last grand movie palace built in the San Francisco Bay Area. It closed in the 1980s as a triplex theatre and was later used as a gymnastics studio. A restoration and expansion project was completed in 2008, making the historic theater the primary anchor of an eight-screen multiplex.

== See also ==
- Paramount Theatre (Oakland, California)
- Fox Oakland Theatre
- Grand Lake Theatre
