= Top of the Mark =

Bar in San Francisco

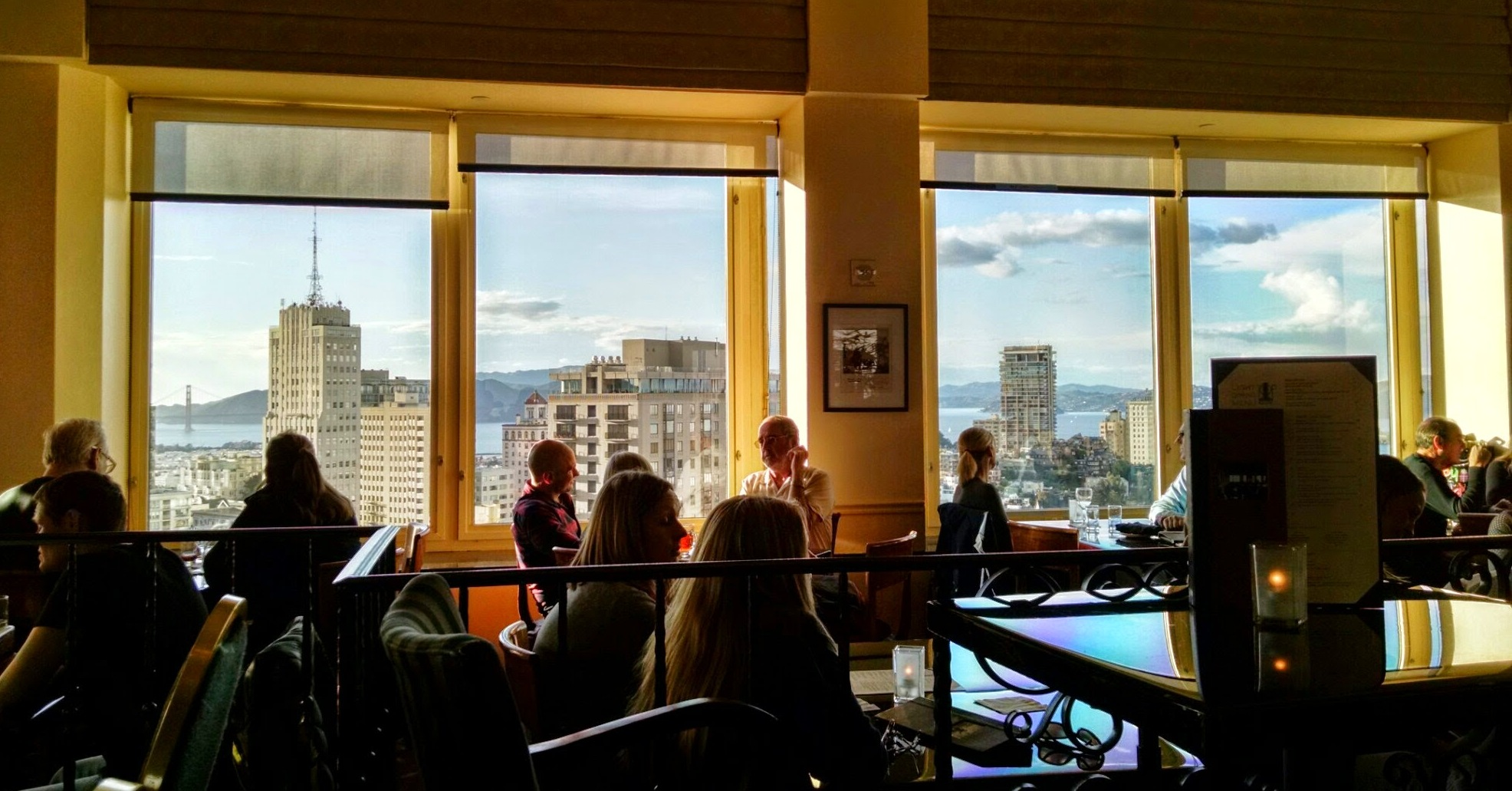
- Interior, showing view

- Location within San Francisco Location within California Location within the United States

Restaurant information
- Established: May 11, 1939
- Owner: InterContintental Hotels Corporation
- Location: 999 California Street, San Francisco, San Francisco, California, 94108, United States
- Coordinates: 37.791558°N 122.410364°W
- Website: www.intercontinentalmarkhopkins.com

The Top of the Mark is a penthouse level bar located on the nineteenth floor of the Mark Hopkins Hotel on Nob Hill at California and Mason Streets in San Francisco, California. Located at the highest point of downtown San Francisco, on fog-free days the Top of the Mark has views of the financial district, Chinatown, North Beach, The San Francisco Bay, and of Grace Cathedral and Huntington Park.

== History ==
The Mark Hopkins Hotel was built by George D. Smith on the site of the old Mark Hopkins mansion, which had burned down following the 1906 San Francisco earthquake. The hotel was dedicated in 1926, and the penthouse suite was rented exclusively to Daniel C. Jackling, reputedly at US$1,250 (equivalent to $23,000 in 2025) per month, until he moved to his house in Woodside in 1936. In 1939, shortly after emerging from a 1933 bankruptcy, George Smith convinced the trustees of the Mark to spend US$110,000 (equivalent to $2,552,000 in 2025) to convert the 11-room penthouse on the hotel's 19th floor into a glass-walled cocktail lounge, which became known as the Top of The Mark.

Marjorie Trumbull won fame in the 1940s for her radio interviews of celebrities broadcast on KSFO and conducted from the Top of the Mark.

During World War II, when San Francisco was a major transit point for troops going to the Pacific Theater, servicemen traditionally had a farewell drink before shipping out while watching the sun set over the Golden Gate Bridge. The northwest corner was known as "Weeper's Corner" after the wives and girlfriends who would gather there for their final look at departing ships.

A new tradition was established during the Korean War, when squadron members would sponsor a "squadron bottle" to be kept available at the bar. Each member would sign and date the label after claiming a free drink, and the man who took the last drink would keep the signed bottle and purchase a new bottle. By the end of the Korean War, thirty-two squadron bottles were in use.

== Present day ==
The Top of the Mark features over 100 variations on the martini. The bar remains popular today, featuring dancing and live music most days of the week. During the December holiday season, the Top of the Mark offers an afternoon tea service.

== Gallery ==
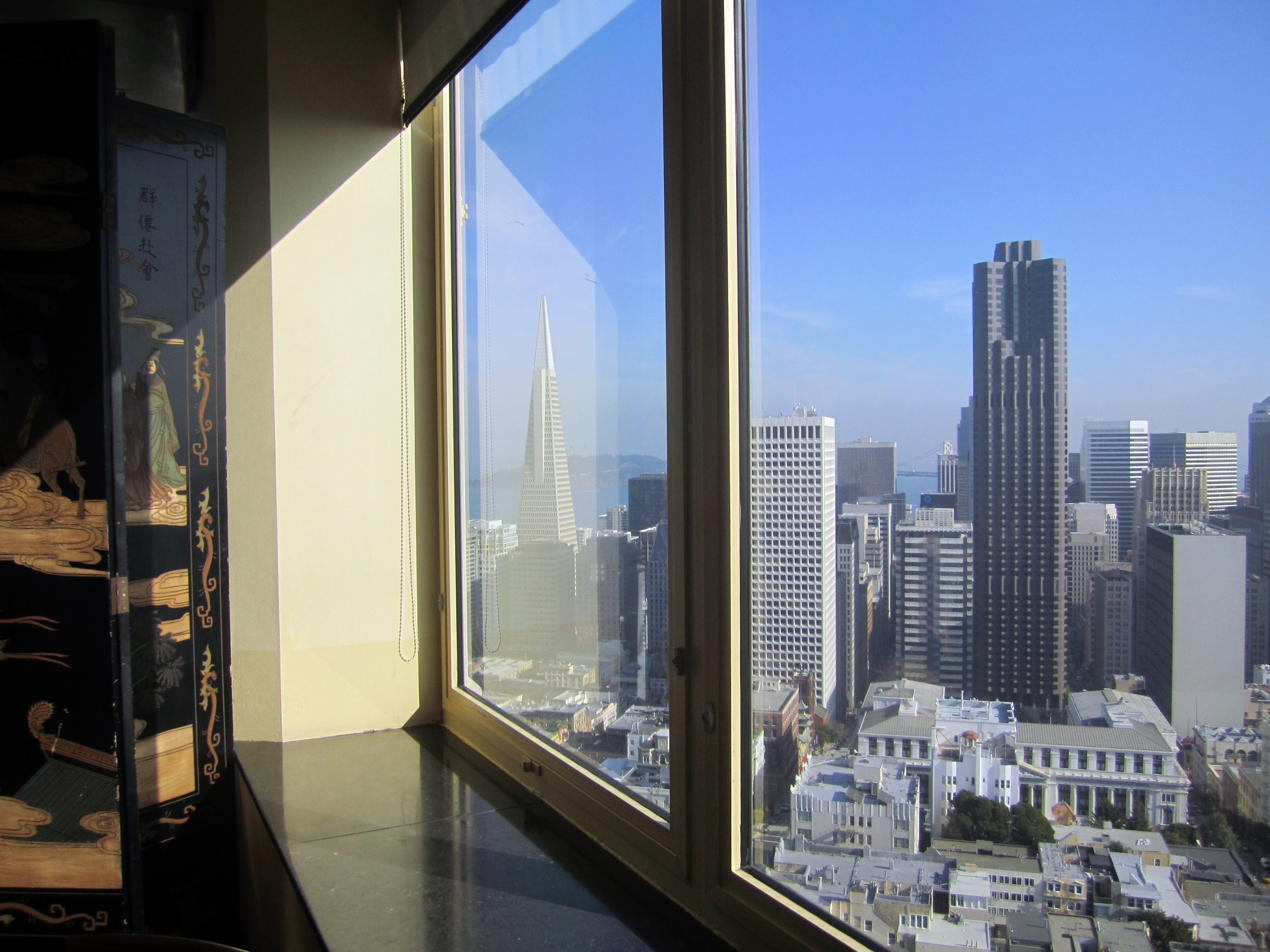
Interior, overlooking the Financial District

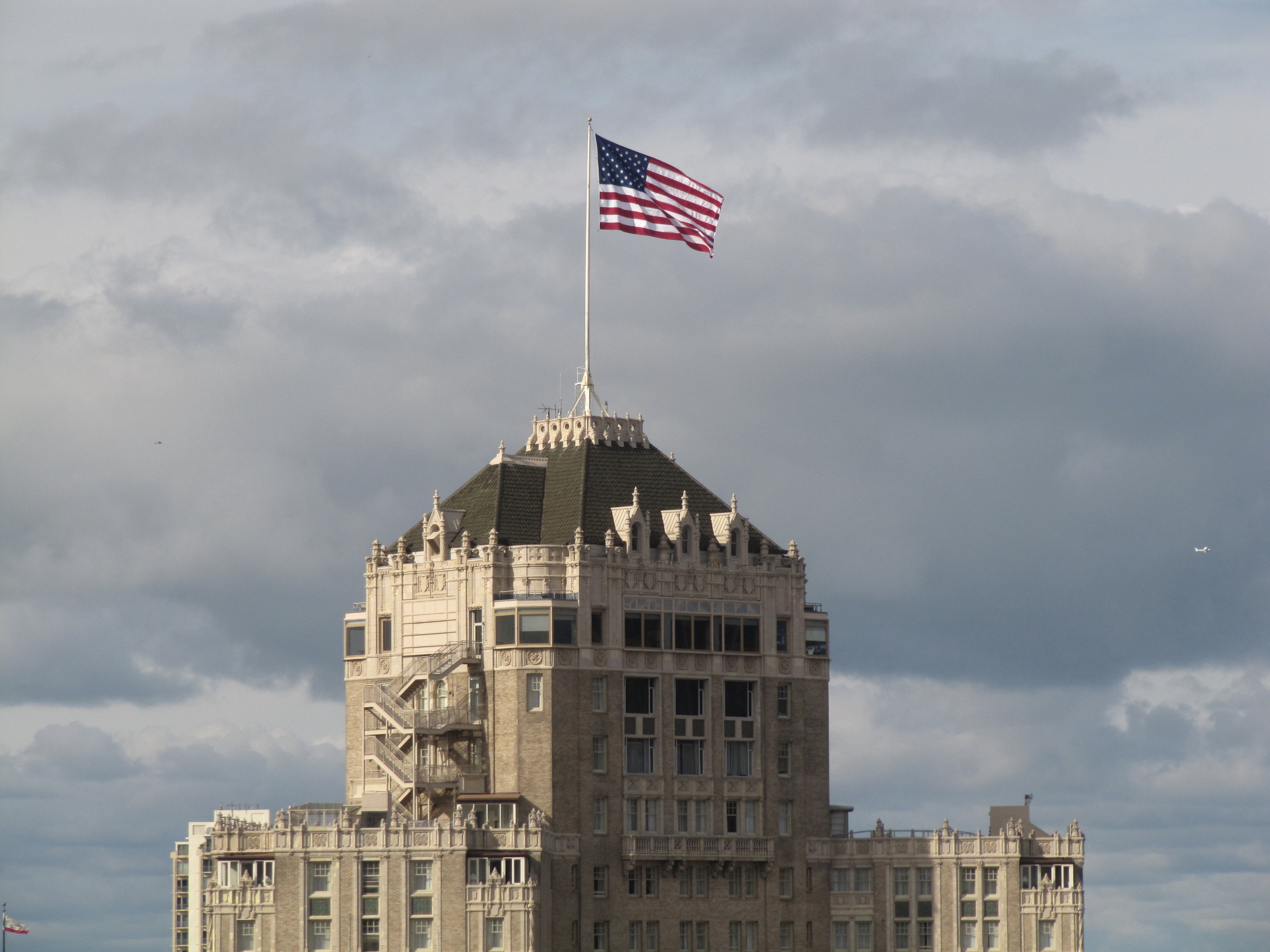
Exterior view

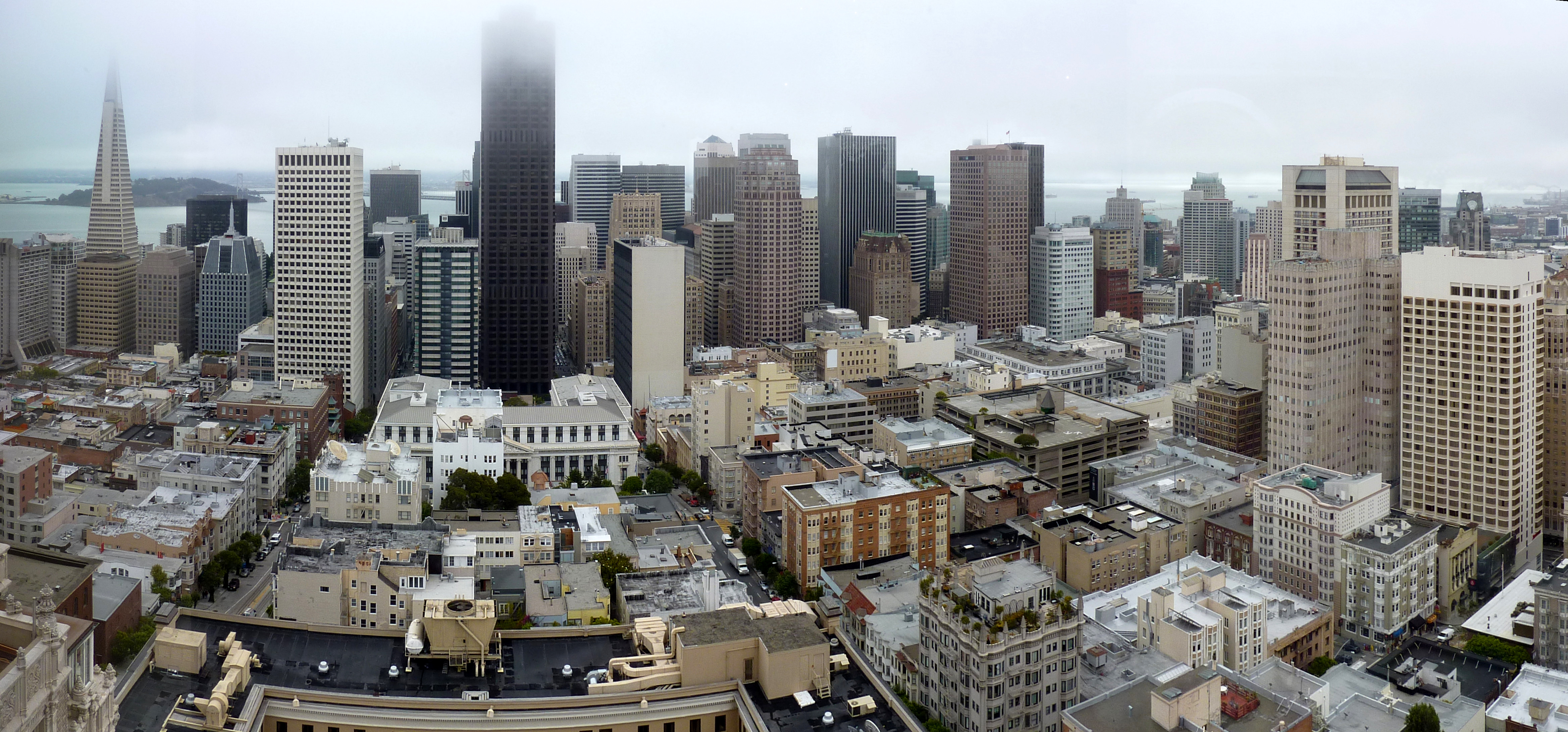
Panoramic view of the Financial District

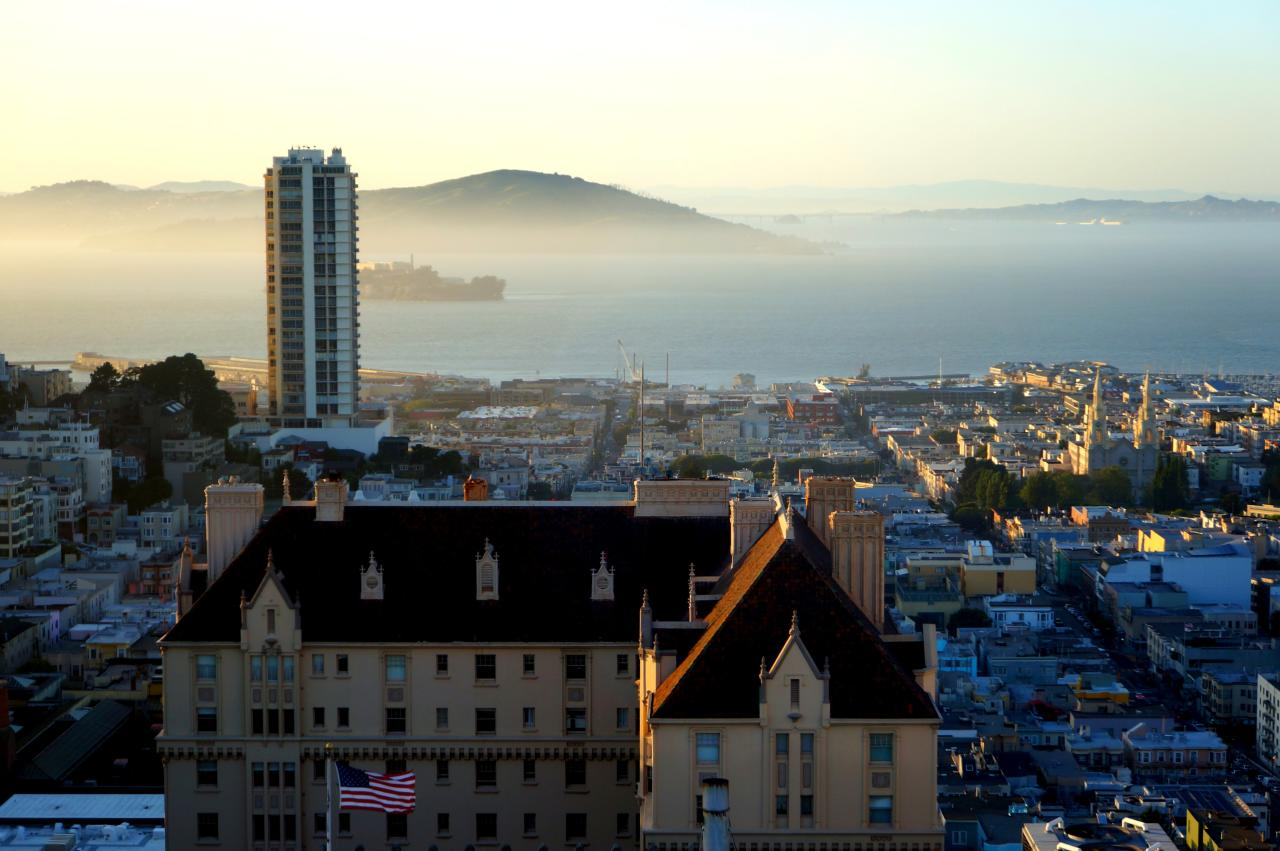
Sunset over San Francisco Bay

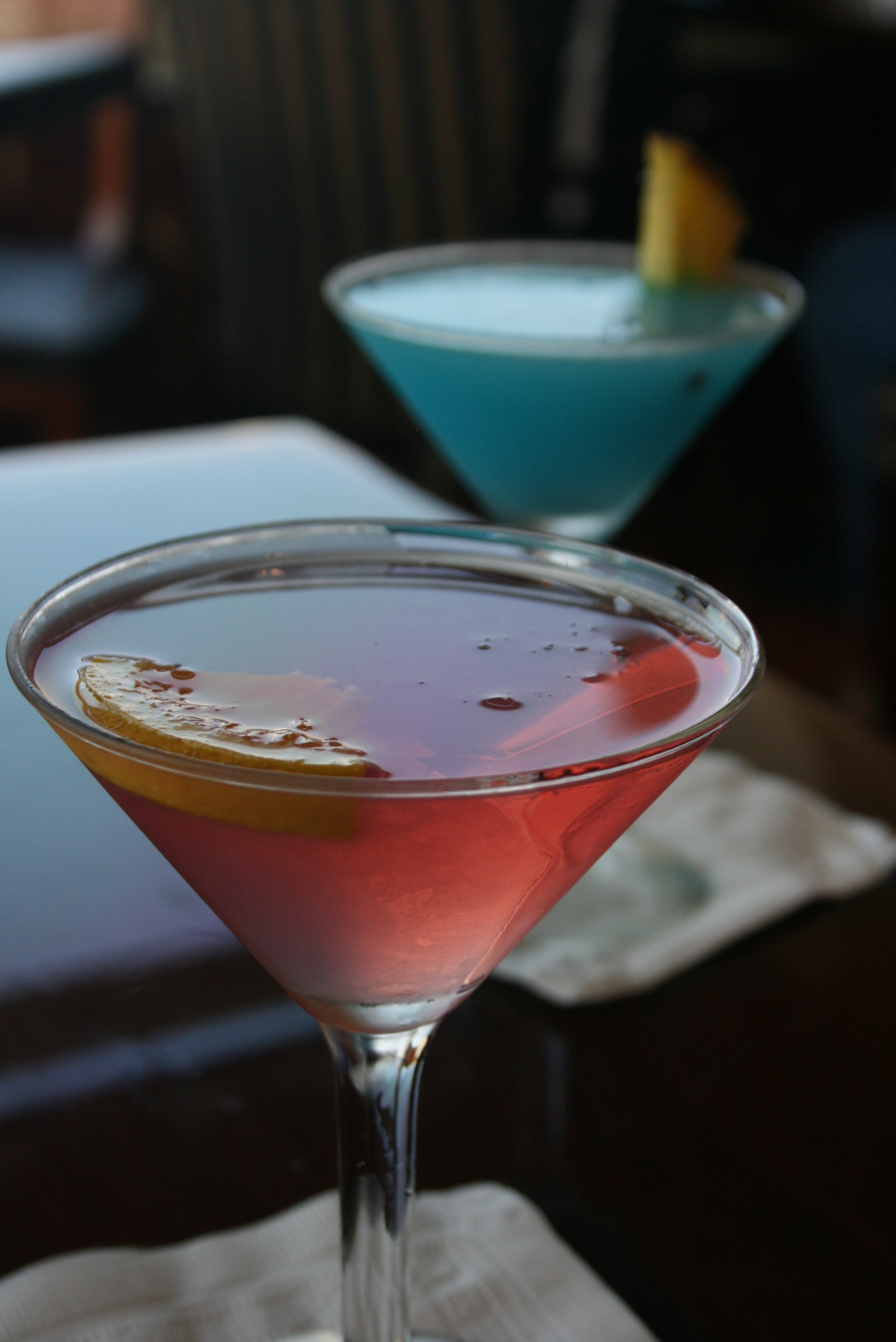
Cocktails at the Top of the Mark

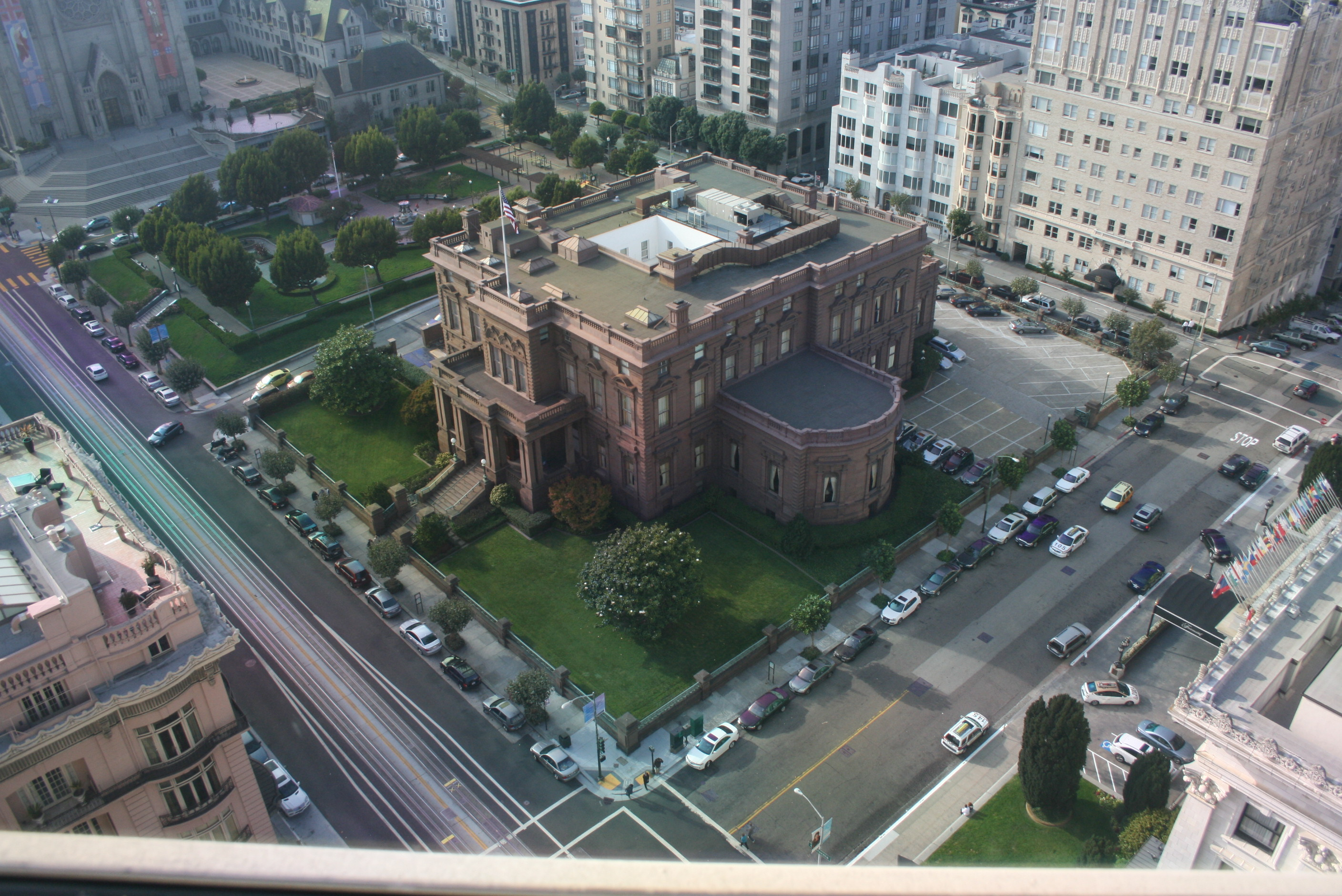
James C. Flood Mansion, Huntington Park, and Grace Cathedral
