= 450 Sutter Street =

450 Sutter
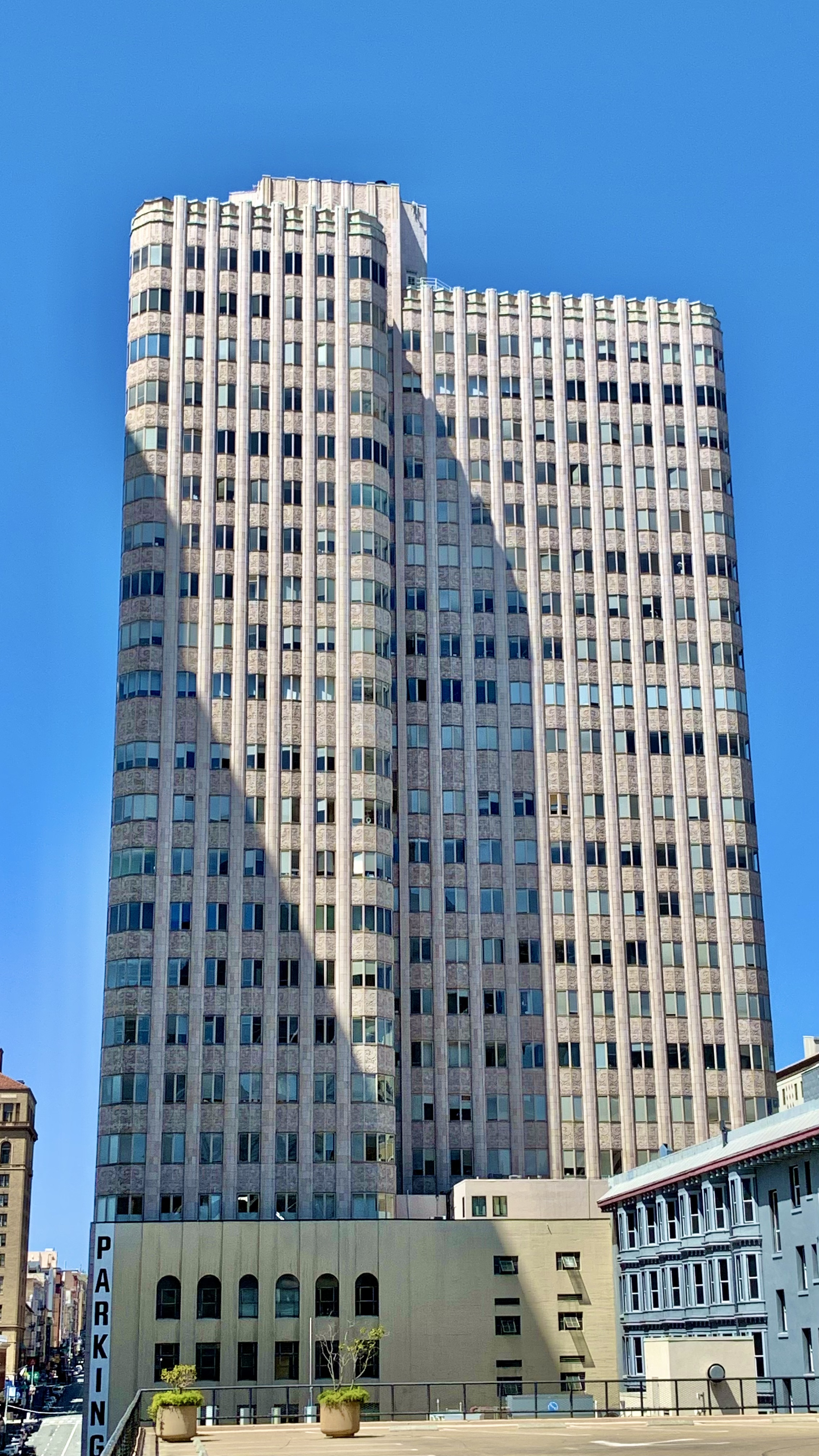
- In May 2021

- Location within San Francisco Location within California Location within the United States
- Alternative names: 450 Sutter Medical Building; Medical-Dental Office Building

General information
- Type: Commercial offices
- Architectural style: Art Deco/ Art Moderne
- Location: 450 Sutter Street; San Francisco, California
- Coordinates: 37.7895°N 122.4077°W
- Completed: October 15, 1929

Height
- Roof: 105 m (344 ft)

Technical details
- Floor count: 26

Design and construction
- Architect: Miller and Pflueger
- Four Fifty Sutter Building
- U.S. National Register of Historic Places
- Built: 1929
- Architectural style: Art deco
- NRHP reference No.: 09001118
- Added to NRHP: December 22, 2009

450 Sutter Street, also called the Four Fifty Sutter Building, is a twenty-six-floor, 105-meter (344-foot) skyscraper in San Francisco, California, completed in 1929. The tower is known for its "Neo-Mayan" Art Deco design by architect Timothy L. Pflueger. The building's vertically faceted exterior later influenced Pietro Belluschi in his similarly faceted exterior of 555 California, the former Bank of America Center completed in 1969.

The building's tenants are largely dental and medical professional offices.

== History ==
In the 1960s, endocrinologist and sexologist Harry Benjamin, known for his pioneering clinical work with transgender people, opened a summer practice in the building, with many of his patients coming from the nearby Tenderloin neighborhood.

== In popular culture ==
In the director's commentary of influential 3D adventure game Grim Fandango, game designer Tim Schafer credits the building as a major aesthetic influence. Schafer said he became familiar with 450 Sutter because his dentist's office was located on one of the upper floors, and that he had modeled the Department of Death, one of the game's most important locations, on the building.

The building is also modeled in the 2003 Maxis video game SimCity 4 as the fictional "Vu Financial" commercial office tower.

== Gallery ==
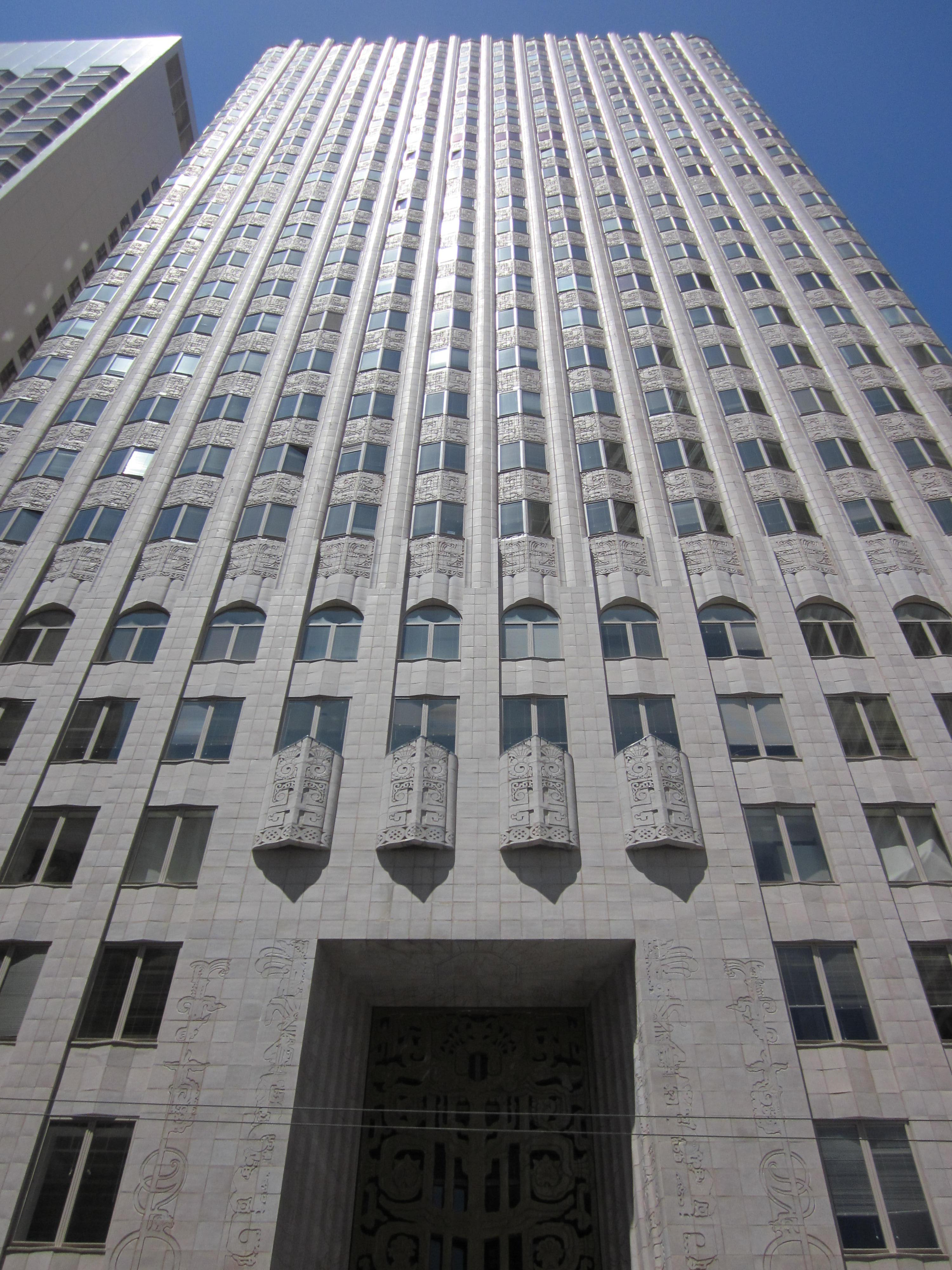

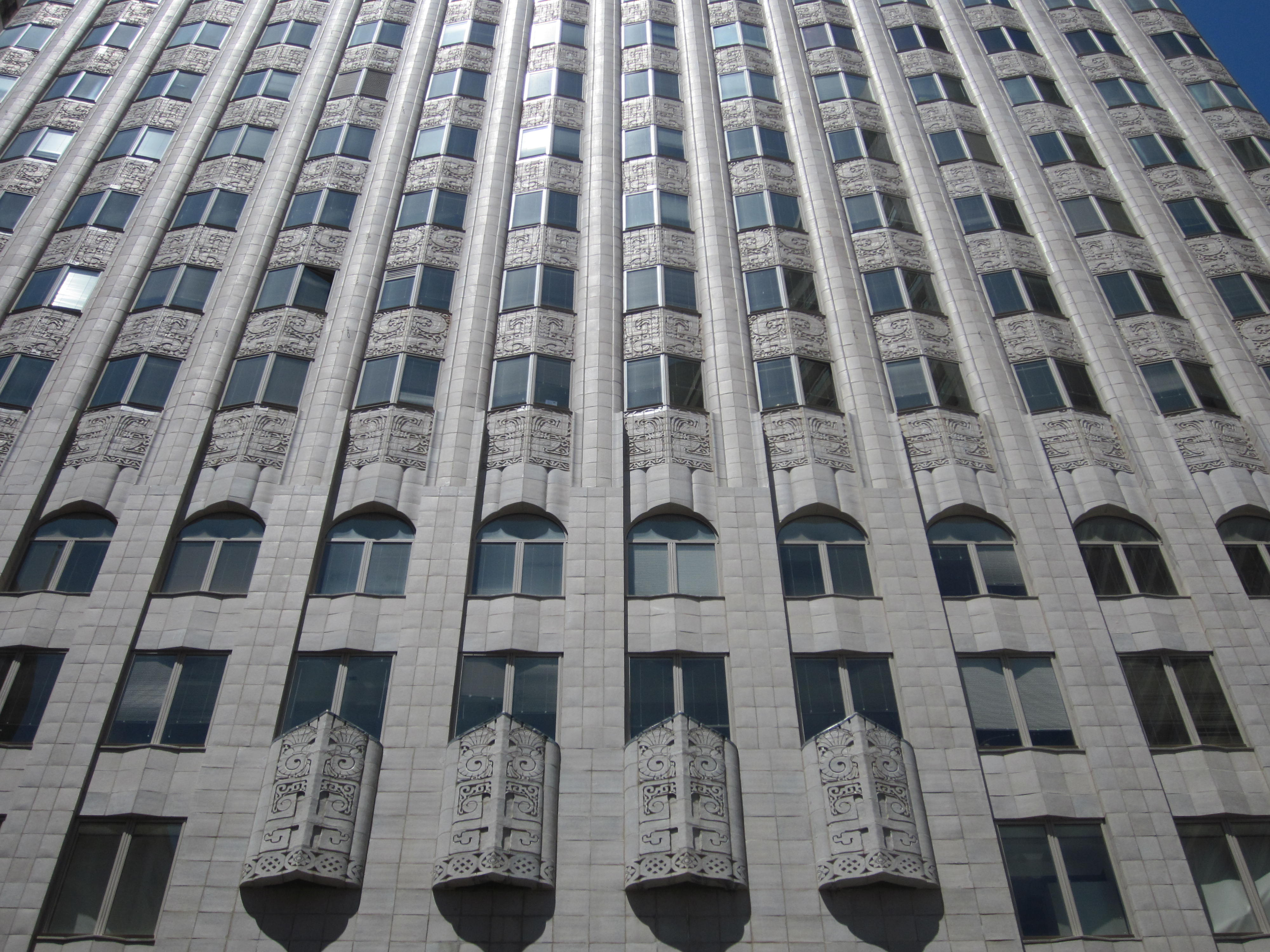

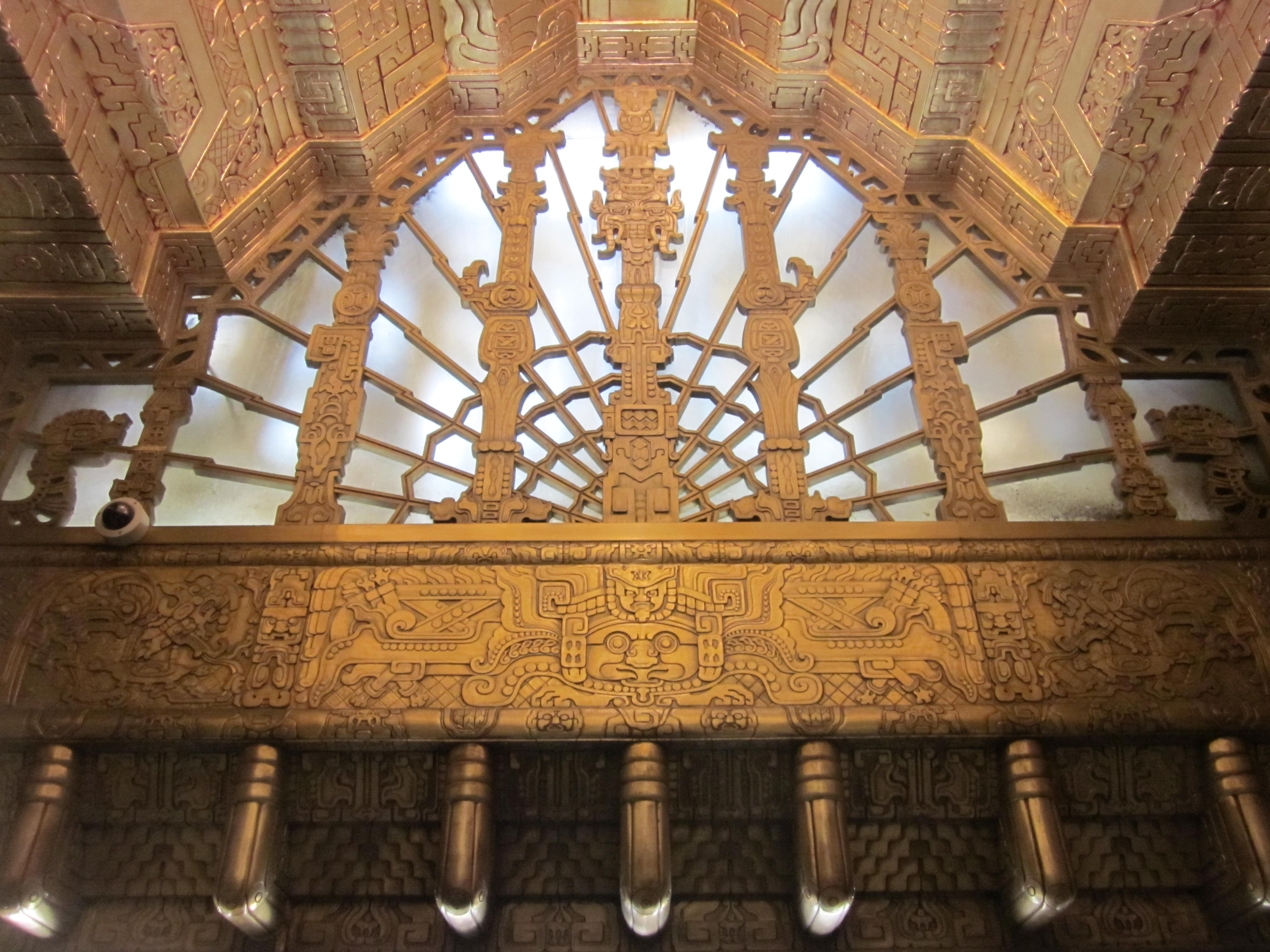

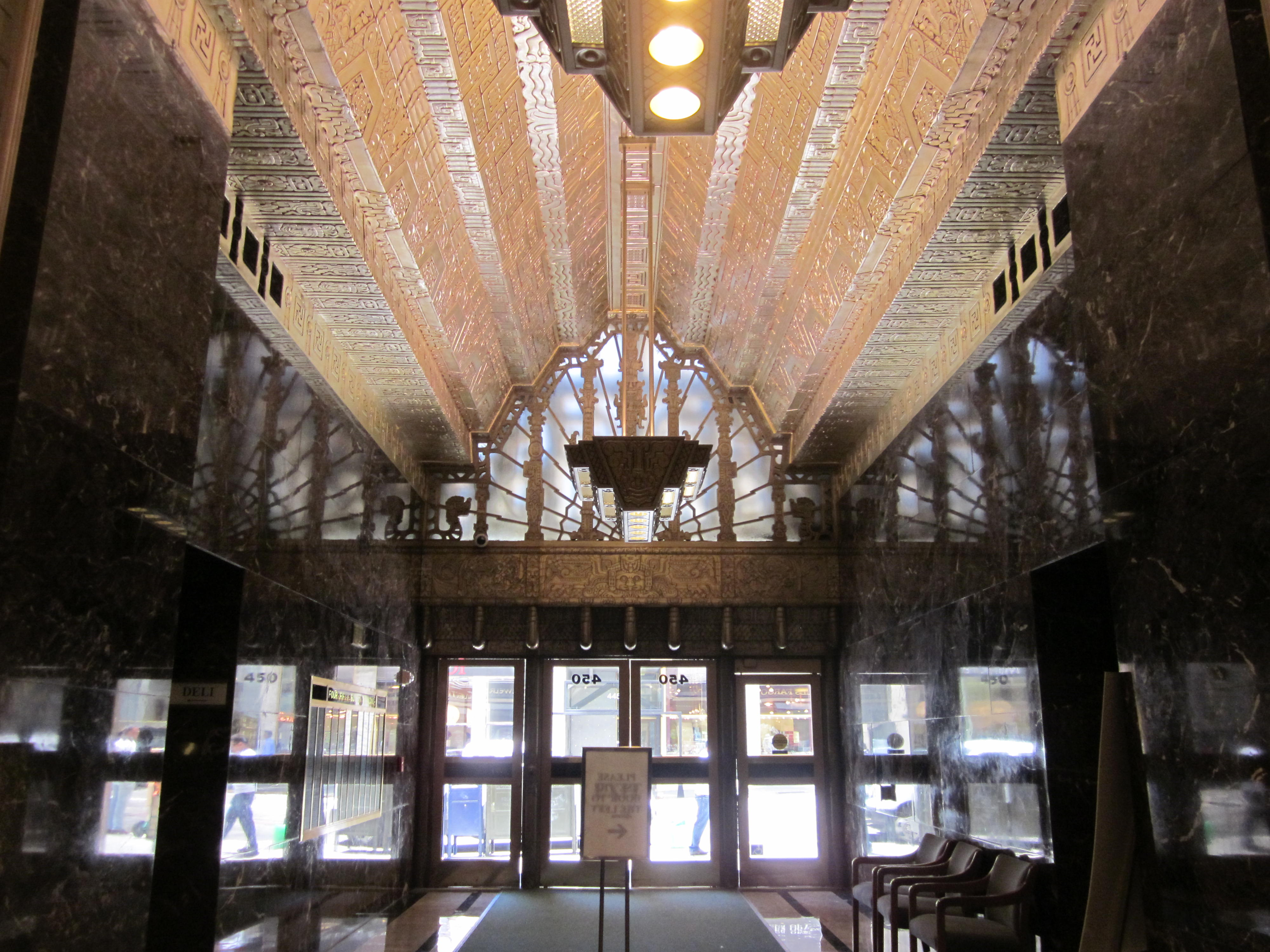

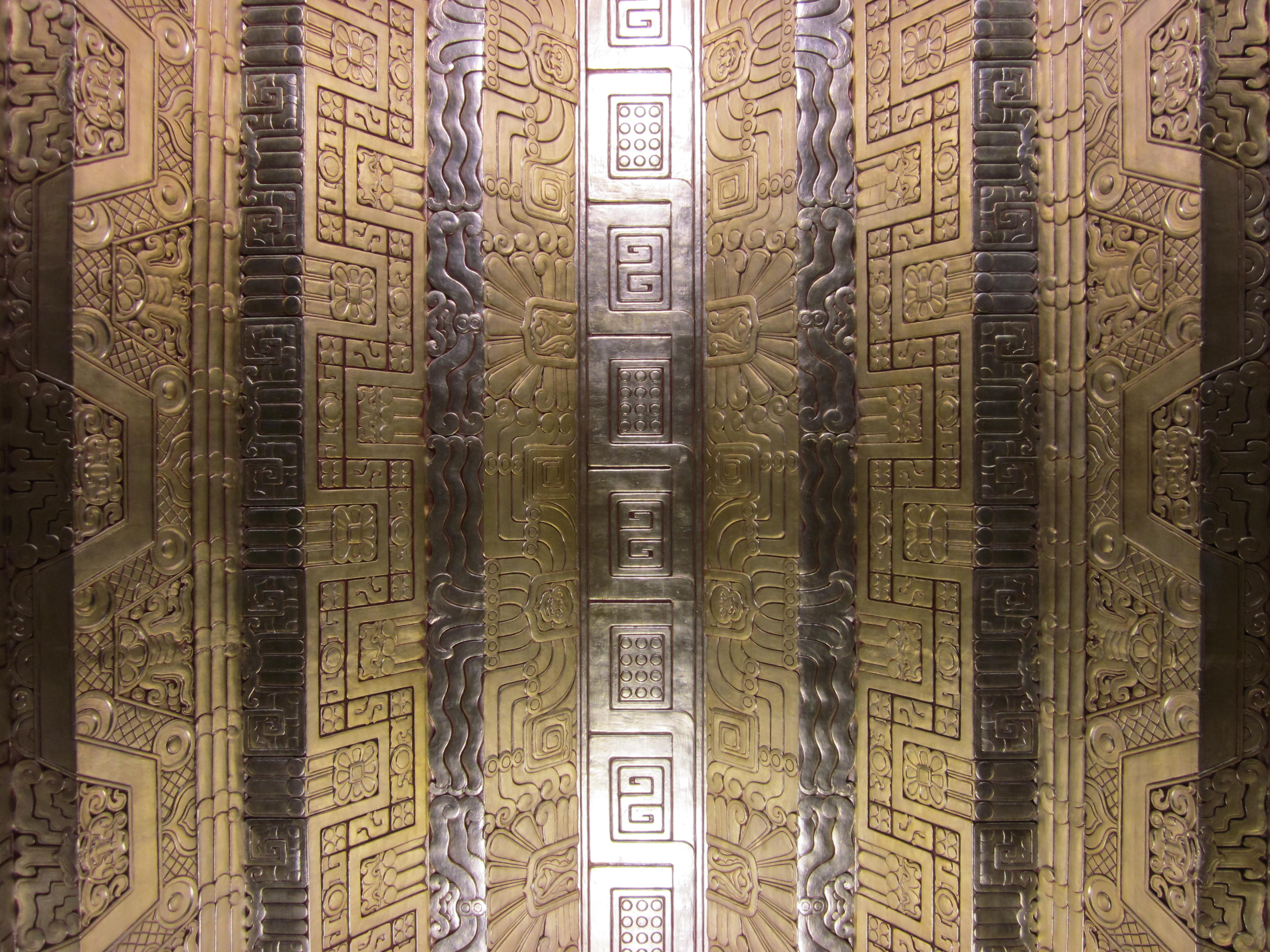

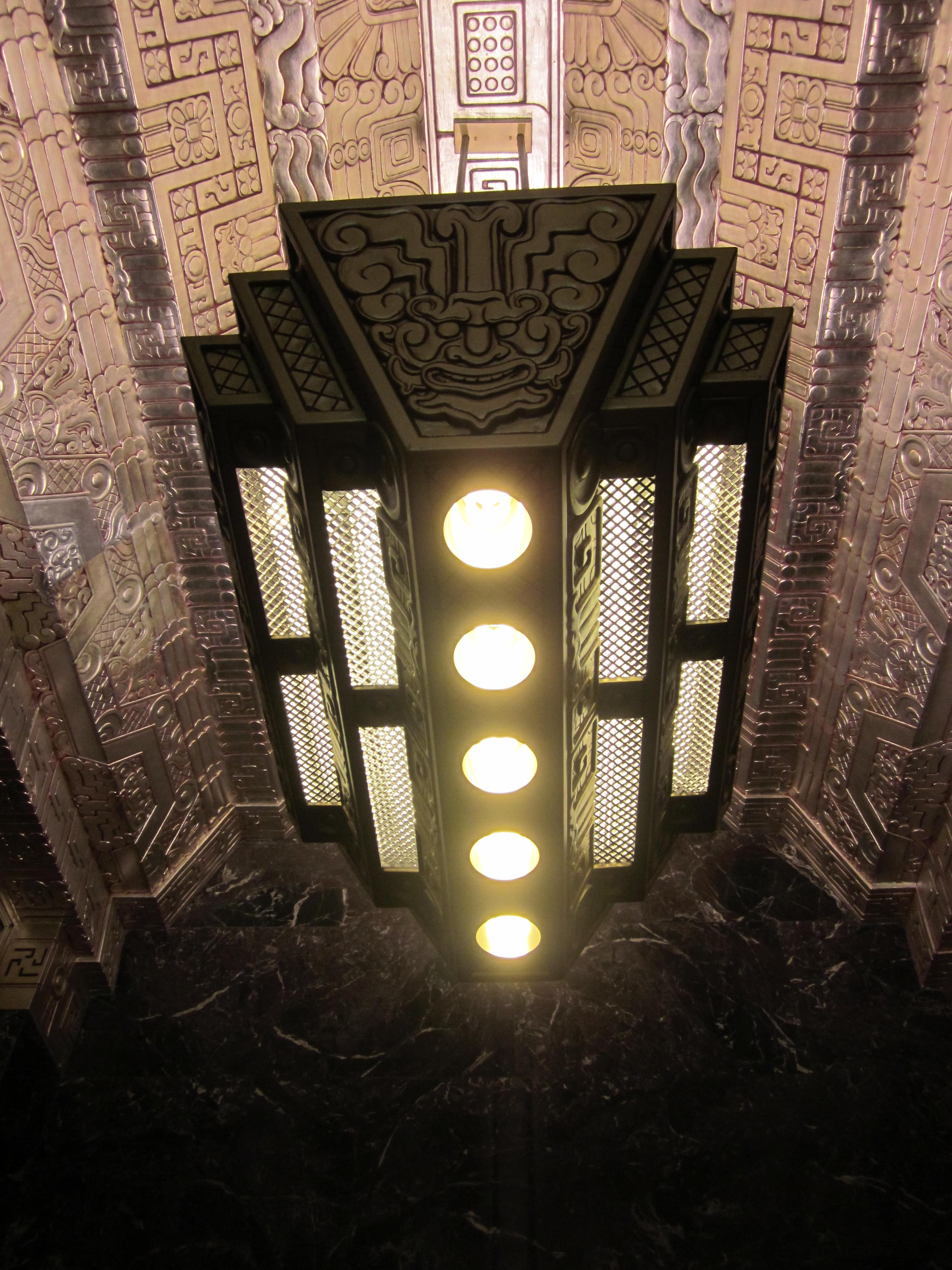

== See also ==
- San Francisco's tallest buildings
