= Our Lady of the Wayside Church =

Historic church in California, United States

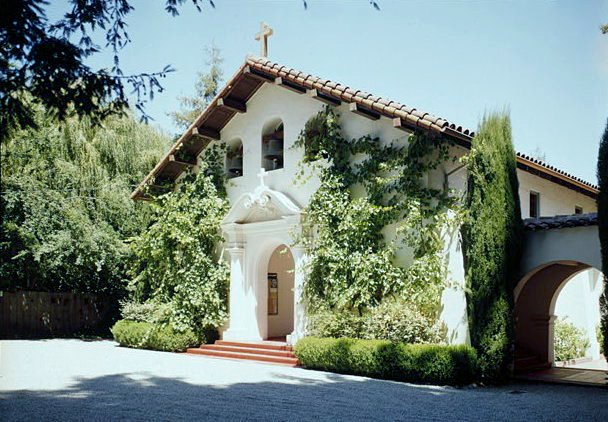
- 1975 photograph documentation by Jack E. Boucher of Historic American Buildings Survey

General information
- Architectural style: Mission Revival
- Location: Portola Valley, California, United States
- Coordinates: 37.3839°N 122.2338°W
- Construction started: 1912
- Completed: 1912

Design and construction
- Architect: Timothy L. Pflueger

U.S. National Register of Historic Places
- Designated: 1977
- Reference no.: 77000338

California Historical Landmark
- Designated: 1977
- Reference no.: 909

Our Lady of the Wayside Church is a modest church built in 1912 for the then-growing Catholic parish of Portola Valley by a combined effort of Jewish, Protestant and Catholic members of The Family, a San Francisco men's club that owns a nearby rural retreat.

The building itself was constructed of steel-reinforced concrete with stucco finish in the Mission Revival style, with the added Georgian element of the main doorway with its scrolled pediment. Mission Revival features include the tiled gable roof with exposed rafter ends, round-arched windows and buttressed side walls.

James Rupert Miller, an architect and a member of The Family, gave the assignment of designing the church to a rising young draftsman at his firm: Timothy L. Pflueger. The building was 19-year-old Pflueger's first commission. Pflueger drew on his familiarity with Mission San Francisco de Asís in his native San Francisco for inspiration.

In 1977, a plaque was placed proclaiming the building as California Registered Historical Landmark number 909. The church was also added to the National Register of Historic Places in 1977.

The historic church suffered extensive damage in the 1989 Loma Prieta earthquake, and was recommended for demolition by structural experts. Instead, it was repaired by its congregation at a cost of US$600,000.
