= Mark Hopkins Hotel =

Hotel in San Francisco, California

InterContinental Mark Hopkins San Francisco
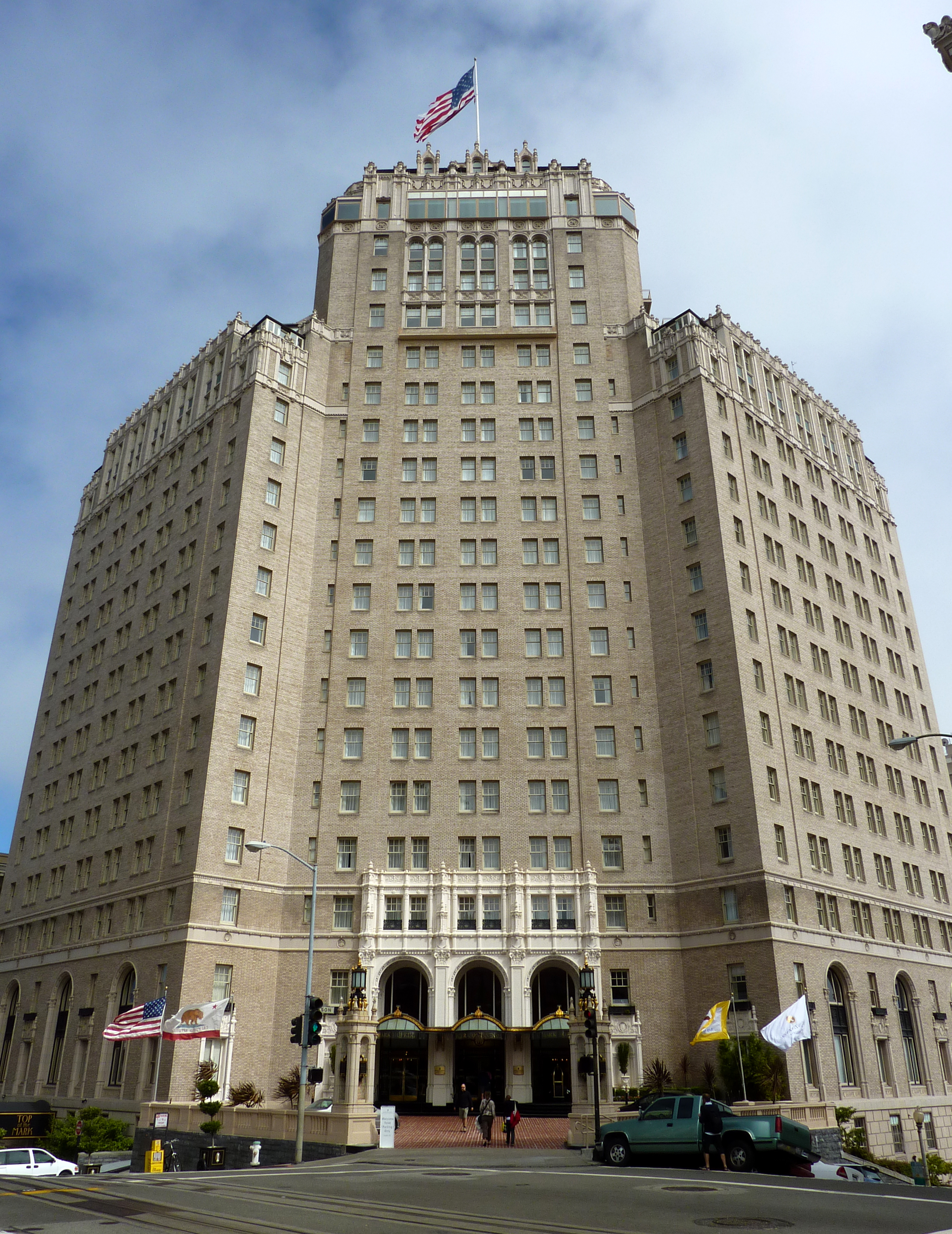
- The Mark Hopkins Hotel, 2009

- Location in Central San Francisco Mark Hopkins Hotel (California) Mark Hopkins Hotel (the United States)
- Hotel chain: InterContinental

General information
- Location: One Nob Hill; 999 California Street; San Francisco, California 94108
- Coordinates: 37.791558°N 122.410364°W
- Opening: 4 December 1926; 99 years ago
- Operator: InterContinental Hotels Group

Height
- Height: 92.97 m (305.0 ft)

Technical details
- Floor count: 19

Design and construction
- Architect: Weeks & Day

Other information
- Number of rooms: 380
- Number of suites: 39
- Number of restaurants: Top of the Mark; Nob Hill Club

Website
- intercontinentalmarkhopkins.com

California Historical Landmark
- Official name: Site of the Mark Hopkins Institute of Art
- Reference no.: 754

San Francisco Designated Landmark
- Reference no.: 184

The InterContinental Mark Hopkins San Francisco is a luxury hotel located at the top of Nob Hill in San Francisco, California. The hotel is managed by InterContinental, a subsidiary of IHG Hotels & Resorts.

The 19th floor penthouse suite was converted in 1939 into the glass-walled Top of the Mark restaurant cocktail lounge.

InterContinental Mark Hopkins Hotel is a member of Historic Hotels of America, the official program of the National Trust for Historic Preservation.

== History ==
=== The site ===
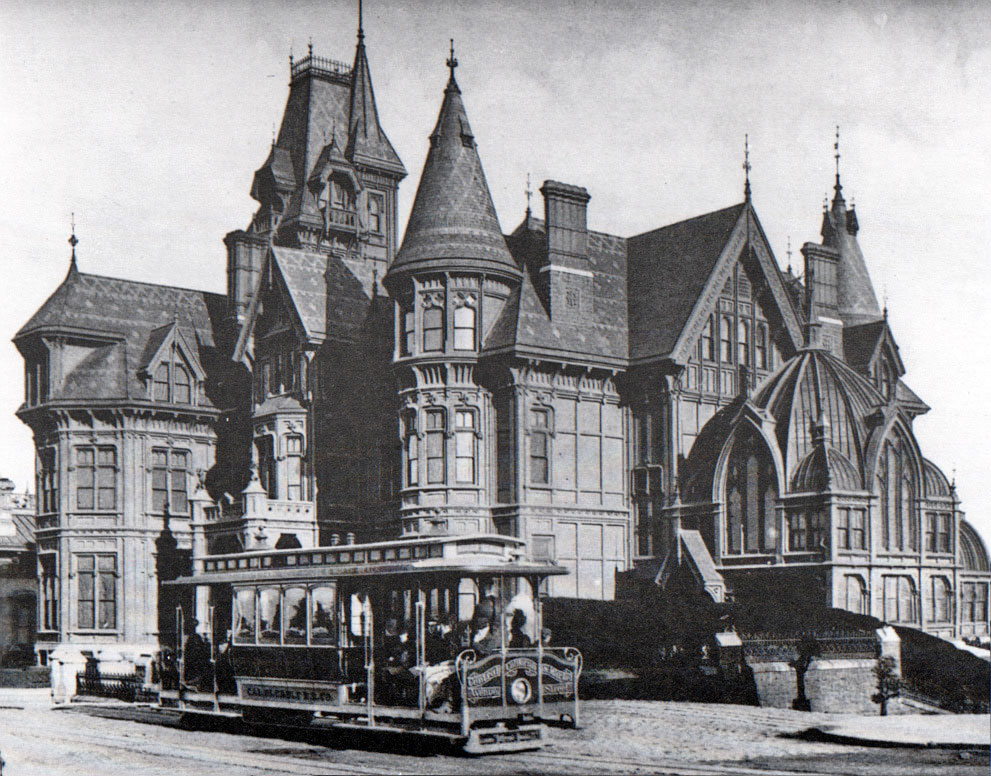
Mark Hopkins Mansion c. 1890s

Mark Hopkins, one of the founders of the Central Pacific Railroad, chose the southeastern peak of Nob Hill as the site for a dream home for his wife, Mary. The mansion was completed in 1878, after his death. Since the tower of the mansion was at the time the highest point in San Francisco, Eadweard Muybridge chose to shoot his 1877 panoramic photograph of the city from this location.

Mary Sherwood Hopkins, on her death in 1891 at the age of 73, left the Nob Hill mansion and a $70 million estate to her second husband, Edward Francis Searles. In 1893, Searles donated the building and grounds to the San Francisco Art Association (now San Francisco Art Institute), for use as a school and museum. It was called the Mark Hopkins Institute of Art and valued at $600,000 at the time.

The Mark Hopkins mansion survived the 1906 San Francisco earthquake; however, it was destroyed in the three-day fire that followed the earthquake.

=== The hotel ===
Mining engineer and hotel investor George D. Smith purchased the Nob Hill site, removed the Art Association building, and began construction of a luxury hotel. The San Francisco architectural firm Weeks and Day designed the 19-story hotel, a combination of French château and Spanish ornamentation. The Hotel Mark Hopkins opened on December 4, 1926.

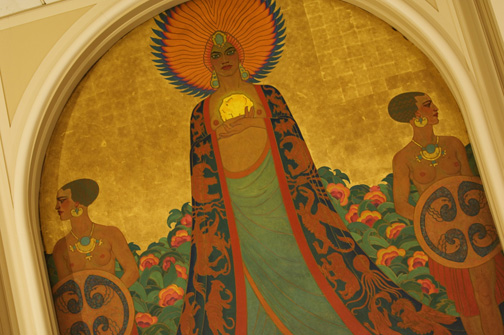
Detail of Calafia mural

One of the banquet areas, "The Room of The Dons", contains a piece of California history. Nine seven-foot-high panels painted by artists Maynard Dixon and Frank Von Sloun in 1926 for the hotel's opening decorate the upper walls. One panel shows Queen Calafia and her Amazons set against a gold leaf sky. Calafia is the namesake for the state of California.

During World War II, the Top Of The Mark lounge was a favored place for Pacific-bound servicemen and their sweethearts to meet before being deployed.

In 1960, the hotel was host to Lance Reventlow and Jill St. John's wedding.

In 1961, the hotel was sold by Smith to Kratter Corp. for over $10 million who sold it the following year to San Francisco financier Louis Lurie for over $12 million.

In 1963, Gene Autry acquired the hotel on a long-term lease. In 1967, Loew's Hotels acquired a 99-year lease on the hotel. Louis R. Lurie accidentally thought he had only agreed to a 25-year lease. A Hawaiian group of investors took over the lease.

In 1973, Lurie's heirs signed a long-term management contract for the Mark Hopkins with Inter-Continental Hotels and it became The Mark Hopkins - An Inter-Continental Hotel. The chain acquired the lessee interest in 1983 and the freehold in 2010. Woodridge Capital Partners Affiliates and funds managed by Oaktree Capital Management purchased the hotel for $120 million in 2014. InterContinental continues to manage the hotel, under a long-term contract.

The Mark Hopkins became a social center for the city, and is rated AAA Four-Diamond and has won the Gold-Key award.

== Landmark status ==
A bronze plaque installed by the California State Park Commission, designating the site California Historical Landmark #754, was commissioned October 20, 1961. The plaque marks the former site of the Mark Hopkins Institute of Art. The Mark Hopkins Hotel is also listed as a San Francisco Designated Landmark.

== See also ==
- San Francisco's tallest buildings
- List of San Francisco Designated Landmarks
