= 650 California Street =

Office building in San Francisco

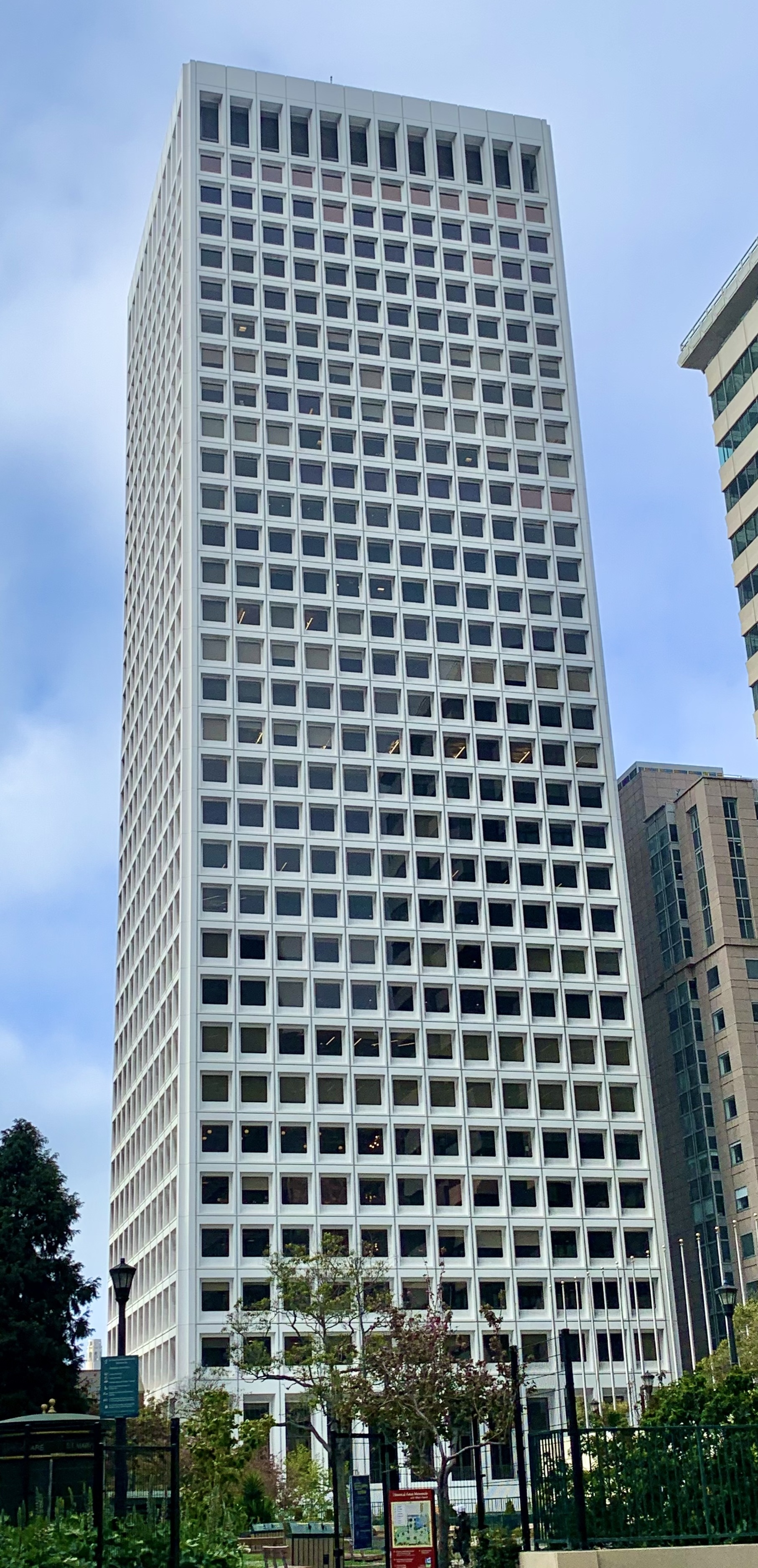
- In 2021

- Location within San Francisco 650 California Street (California) 650 California Street (the United States)
- Alternative names: Hartford Building

Record height
- Preceded by: Russ Building
- Surpassed by: 44 Montgomery

General information
- Status: Completed
- Type: Commercial offices
- Location: 650 California Street; San Francisco
- Coordinates: 37.792833°N 122.405194°W
- Completed: 1964; Dinwiddie Construction Company
- Owner: Columbia Property Trust Inc.

Height
- Roof: 142 m (466 ft)

Technical details
- Floor count: 34
- Floor area: 461,000 sq ft (42,800 m^{2})

Design and construction
- Architect: Skidmore, Owings & Merrill

650 California Street, also known as the Hartford Building, is a 34-story, 142 m (466 feet) office tower on the northwestern edge of San Francisco's Financial District. The tower is located on California Street on the edge of Chinatown, and not far from 555 California Street. 650 California is visible from every direction except from the southeast, where the Financial District skyscrapers block the view.

== Description ==
The building was designed by Edward Charles Bassett of Skidmore, Owings & Merrill for Hartford Insurance, its initial tenant. It is architecturally significant, featuring a tall modernist lobby, high ceilings, and an exterior skeleton of floor-to-ceiling windows recessed into a square gridwork of precast white reinforced concrete.

When this tower was completed in 1964, it was the second in San Francisco larger than 400,000 sq ft (37,000 m^{2}). For a time it was also California's tallest building, replacing both the Russ Building in San Francisco and the Los Angeles City Hall in Los Angeles, California. It is one of 39 San Francisco high rises reported by the U.S. Geological Survey as potentially vulnerable to a large earthquake, due to a structural deficiency.

650 California was acquired for US$160 million by the Pivotal Group in 2000, and later sold to private investors, A-650 California St. LLC, and AEW Capital Management in 2007. The tower was acquired by Tishman Speyer and partner Prudential Real Estate Investors in 2012 for about US$230 million. Tishman undertook a US$14 million renovation, which included a remodeled lobby by New York-based firm MdeAS Architects. Tishman sold 650 California to Columbia Property Trust Inc. in September 2014 for US$309 million.

650 California Street passed the certification requirements for the Gold Level of the Leadership in Energy and Environmental Design (LEED) rating in June 2011. The LEED building certification system is a program for rating the design, construction and operation of environmentally and socially responsible buildings.

The building is the fictional setting of Doris Martin's workplace in The Doris Day Show.

After Elon Musk's acquisition of Twitter, the company ceased paying rent for its 30th floor office rental. In response, the building's landlord filed court papers in San Francisco State Court.

== Tenants ==
Key tenants include Access Communications, Affirm, AppDirect, Analysis Group, CrossInstall, Credit Suisse, Dentsu International, Omnicom Group Inc., Recommind, Twitter, and Vector Capital.

== See also ==
- San Francisco's tallest buildings
