= Eliel Saarinen's Tribune Tower design =

Unbuilt design for a modernist skyscraper

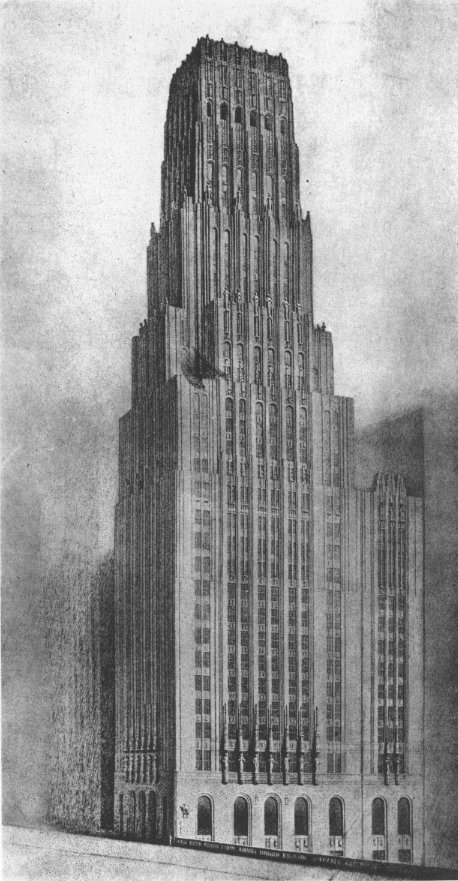
- Eliel Saarinen's unbuilt 1922 skyscraper design
- Alternative names: Saarinen tower

General information
- Status: Never built
- Type: Commercial offices

Technical details
- Floor count: 29
- Lifts/elevators: 12

Design and construction
- Architect: Eliel Saarinen

Eliel Saarinen's Tribune Tower design, also called the Saarinen tower, was an unbuilt design for a skyscraper by Finnish architect Eliel Saarinen. It was submitted in 1922 for the architectural competition organized by the Chicago Tribune for their new headquarters. The winning entry, the neo-Gothic Tribune Tower, was constructed in 1925. Saarinen's entry came in second place but had a significant influence on the design of numerous future buildings.

== Background ==
In 1921–22, the Tribune Tower competition was held to determine the design for the new headquarters of the Chicago Tribune, a major American metropolitan newspaper. The competition garnered 260 entries, and the first place honor was awarded to a design by New York architects John Mead Howells and Raymond Hood. Their neo-Gothic building was completed in 1925. Eliel Saarinen received $20,000 for his second-place finish, although his design was never constructed. Many observers considered Saarinen's simplified yet soaring setback tower to be the most fitting entry, and his innovative modernist design exerted a significant influence on subsequent architectural projects.

Although Saarinen was an experienced architect, he had never previously undertaken the design of a skyscraper. To develop his noteworthy design, he drew inspiration from the upward sweep of Gothic architecture, which he then elevated as his primary design principle, emphasizing verticality. He emphasized that through "logical construction," each element of the design was intended to contribute to the overall goal of verticality. Saarinen submitted the design at the age of 49, and the following year he relocated from Finland to the Chicago area. While in the U.S., he contributed to an overall design for the Chicago lakefront, and he lectured at the University of Michigan. However, none of his skyscraper designs were ever built. Nonetheless, others found success by incorporating his visionary ideas. Co-winner of the Tribune Tower competition, Raymond Hood, adopted Saarinen's skyscraper style for several subsequent projects. Additionally, other contemporary architects, including Timothy L. Pflueger, George W. Kelham, Hubbell and Benes, Holabird & Roche, Alfred C. Finn, and James Edwin Ruthven Carpenter Jr., as well as later architect César Pelli, emulated Saarinen's design.

== Reception ==
Respected Chicago architect Louis Sullivan offered high praise to Saarinen's design, and said that his building indicated the future direction for the old Chicago School. Sullivan named Saarinen his stylistic successor. Chicago architects Thomas Tallmadge and Irving Kane Pond were also very vocal in their praise for Saarinen. Pond said Saarinen's design was by far the best contest entry, being devoid of the superficial adornments featured on the winning entry, and free of the "stranglehold of conventional forms." Tallmadge projected that Saarinen's design would be transformative for American skyscrapers. He said that under Saarinen's hand, the spirit of the skyscraper, "rid of its inhibitions and suppressed desires... leaps in joyous freedom to the sky."

Skyscraper Museum director Carol Willis, and art consultant Franck Mercurio, curator at the Field Museum in Chicago, offer moderating modern views about the influence of Saarinen's design. Willis notes that setback architecture was being implemented in New York City highrises because of 1916 zoning ordinances related to building height and sunlight, and that Saarinen's design was understood to be an embodiment of this trend. Mercurio points to the Tribune Tower competition entry from American architect Bertram Goodhue as having the same modernist features as Saarinen's, with dramatic setbacks but a more pronounced simplification of the exterior. Mercurio argues that Goodhue's design is a better example of modernism because it has less ornamentation. Goodhue's entry gained him honorable mention but no cash award.

== Buildings influenced ==
The following buildings are regarded to have been influenced by Saarinen's 1922 design.

Name	Image	Location	Architect	Floors	Year	Notes
American Radiator Building		New York City	Raymond Hood	23	1924	The American Radiator Building was the next commission by Raymond Hood following his success in the Tribune Tower competition. Hood quickly adapted Saarinen's style and applied it to this design, which was finished with construction before the Tribune Tower was completed.
140 New Montgomery		San Francisco	Timothy L. Pflueger	26	1925	Originally called the Pacific Telephone & Telegraph Building, 140 New Montgomery was designed by San Francisco architect Timothy L. Pflueger in 1923–1924 to be the headquarters for Pacific Telephone & Telegraph. The 26-story building, completed in 1925, was the tallest in San Francisco for 40 years, in a close tie with the Russ Building. Pflueger's vision for the building lay in combining the vertical thrust of Saarinen with the reflective qualities of Sierra granite.
Russ Building		San Francisco	George Kelham	32	1927	The Russ Building was designed by architect George Kelham. The 32-story building, completed in 1927, was the tallest in San Francisco for 38 years, in a close tie with 140 New Montgomery.
AT&T Huron Road Building		Cleveland	Hubbell and Benes	24	1927	Originally known as the Ohio Bell Building, the skyscraper served as offices and a regional switching center for telephone company Ohio Bell. The building was designed by Hubbell and Benes with a perpendicular modernist vision following Saarinen's lead.
333 North Michigan		Chicago	Holabird & Root, John Wellborn Root Jr.	34	1928	John Wellborn Root Jr. designed the exterior of this commercial skyscraper, keeping to the clean verticality of Saarinen's design.
Fisher Building		Detroit	Albert Kahn Associates, Joseph Nathaniel French	30	1928	The Fisher Building was built across the street from the headquarters of General Motors (GM) to house the offices of Fisher Body which had been acquired in 1926 by GM. Joseph Nathaniel French of Albert Kahn Associates served as the chief architect. French's hand is strongly evident, taking his inspiration from Saarinen's clean vertical lines; the building is unlike other Albert Kahn works.
Beekman Tower		New York City	John Mead Howells	26	1928	The Beekman Tower was designed by John Mead Howells for the New York chapter of the Panhellenic Association. Its setbacks and massing were based on Saarinen's design.
JPMorgan Chase Building (Houston)		Houston	Alfred C. Finn, Kenneth Franzheim, and J. E. R. Carpenter	36	1929	Originally known as the Gulf Building and built to house the offices of Gulf Oil, National Bank of Commerce, and the Sakowitz brothers, the building was commissioned by Texas politician and entrepreneur Jesse H. Jones. Its stepped profile was based on Saarinen's 1922 design. Later it was known as the Texas Commerce Bank Building. It was the tallest building in Houston until 1963.
David Stott Building		Detroit	Donaldson and Meier	38	1929	The David Stott Building is the tallest ever designed by Donaldson and Meier. Verticality is emphasized by the near absence of ornamentation, and by a relatively small footprint which yields a slender profile. The building features a series of setbacks from the 23rd floor upward. Michigan architecture professor Eric J. Hill of the American Institute of Architects wrote that the David Stott Building is a classic example of modernism, and that few Detroit skyscrapers "captured the ideal" of Saarinen's design so well.
Seattle Tower		Seattle	Albertson, Wilson & Richardson	27	1929	The Seattle Tower was built as the Northern Life Tower, to serve as the headquarters for Northern Life Insurance Company. Architects Albertson, Wilson & Richardson took inspiration from Saarinen's vertically oriented design.
Shell Building		San Francisco	George Kelham	28	1929	The Shell Building in San Francisco was designed by George Kelham. The 28-story building was completed in 1929. Kelham emphasized Gothic verticality; the top of the building is especially like Saarinen's design.
Powhatan Apartments		Chicago	Leichenko & Esser, Charles L. Morgan	22	1929	The Powhatan is one of five apartment buildings financed in the late 1920s by the Garard Trust, designed by the architectural firm Leichenko & Esser, with Charles L. Morgan responsible for appearance. He was influenced largely by Saarinen's stripped-down exterior design incorporating unbroken vertical piers.
Daily News Building		New York City	John Mead Howells, Raymond Hood	36	1930	The New York Daily News headquarters is a modernist stepback building designed by Howells and Hood, the winners of the Tribune Tower competition. Though the exterior is mostly free from ornament, Howells and Hood embraced a more expressive Art Deco-style in their design of the interior, especially the lobby.
McAllister Tower Apartments		San Francisco	Timothy L. Pflueger	28	1930	The McAllister Tower Apartments, originally the William Taylor Hotel, was designed by Timothy L. Pflueger for a church congregation. The 28-story building, completed in 1930, was initially an unusual combination of church at street level and hotel above it.
Tower Petroleum Building		Dallas	Mark Lemmon	23	1931	Architect Mark Lemmon hewed closely to Saarinen's vision by implementing two setbacks.
Bryant Building		Kansas City	Graham, Anderson, Probst & White	26	1931	The design is an adaptation of Eliel Saarinen's design .
181 West Madison Street		Chicago	César Pelli	50	1990	Early in his career, César Pelli was a project designer under Eero Saarinen, the architect son of Eliel Saarinen. The strong verticality of 181 West Madison Street is emphasized by setbacks in the manner of the elder Saarinen.
