= The Montgomery (San Francisco) =

Coordinates: 37.78762°N 122.40112°W

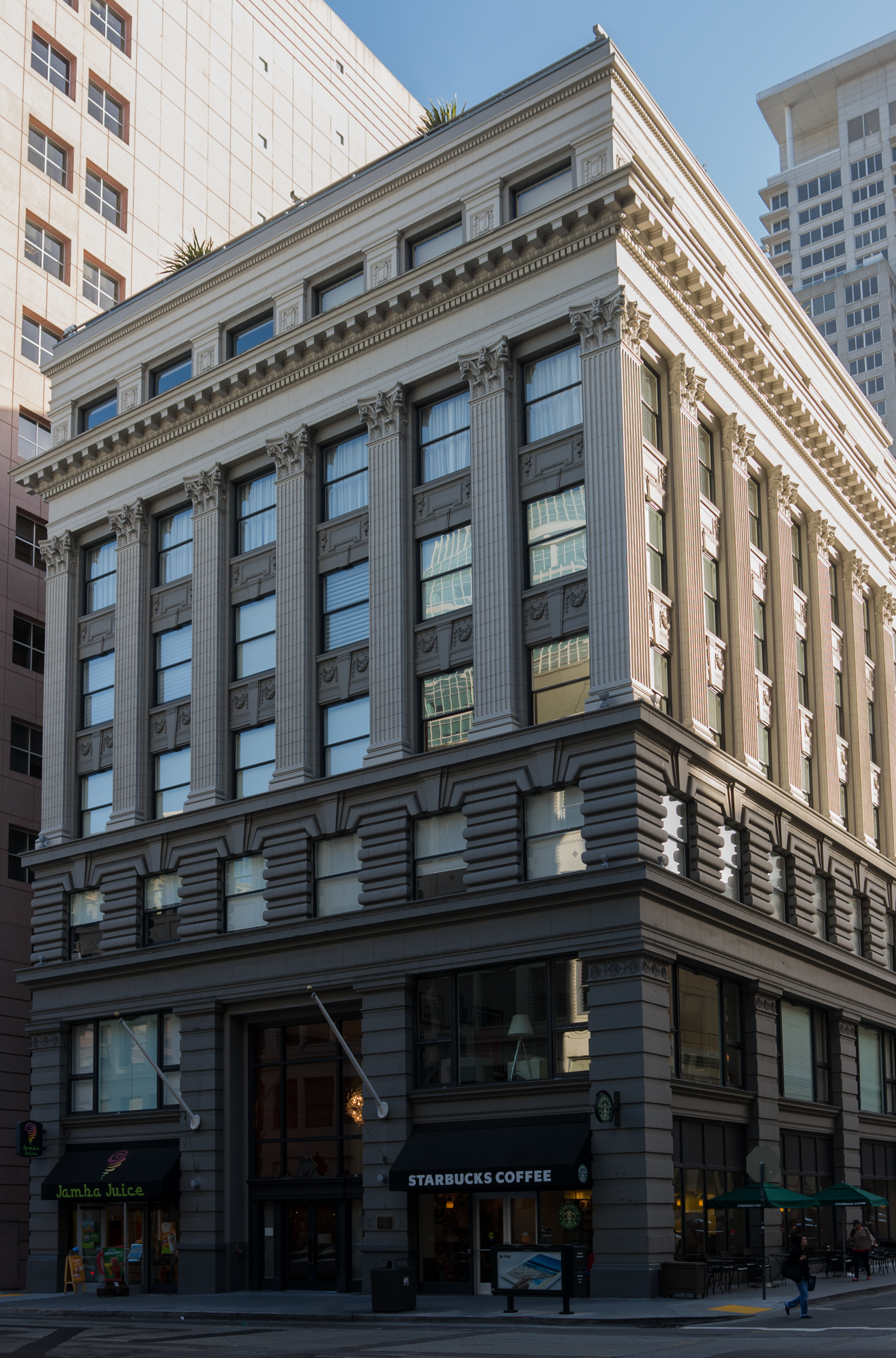
The Montgomery in 2012.

The Montgomery is a residential highrise located at 74 New Montgomery Street in San Francisco, California. The building was designed by the Reid Brothers architects in 1914 and served as headquarters and the offices of the newspaper The San Francisco Call after its building, The Call Building, was damaged in the great fire.

The site was selected for its central location, which quickly became a regional media hub during that time period. From 1914 to 1950 The Montgomery was home to The San Francisco Call and at times the offices of rival publications as well. From 1950 until 2005 the building continued to be utilized as premium commercial office space. In 2005, a team of developers took over the project, close to the Civic Center, the Financial District and Union Square, and converted it into a luxury residential building.

Today there are 107 new residences at 74 New Montgomery. The new developers installed new electrical wiring (including CAT 5), new windows designed to preserve the classic aesthetics, and a seismic retrofit to the foundation.
