= New Montgomery Street =

Street in San Francisco, California

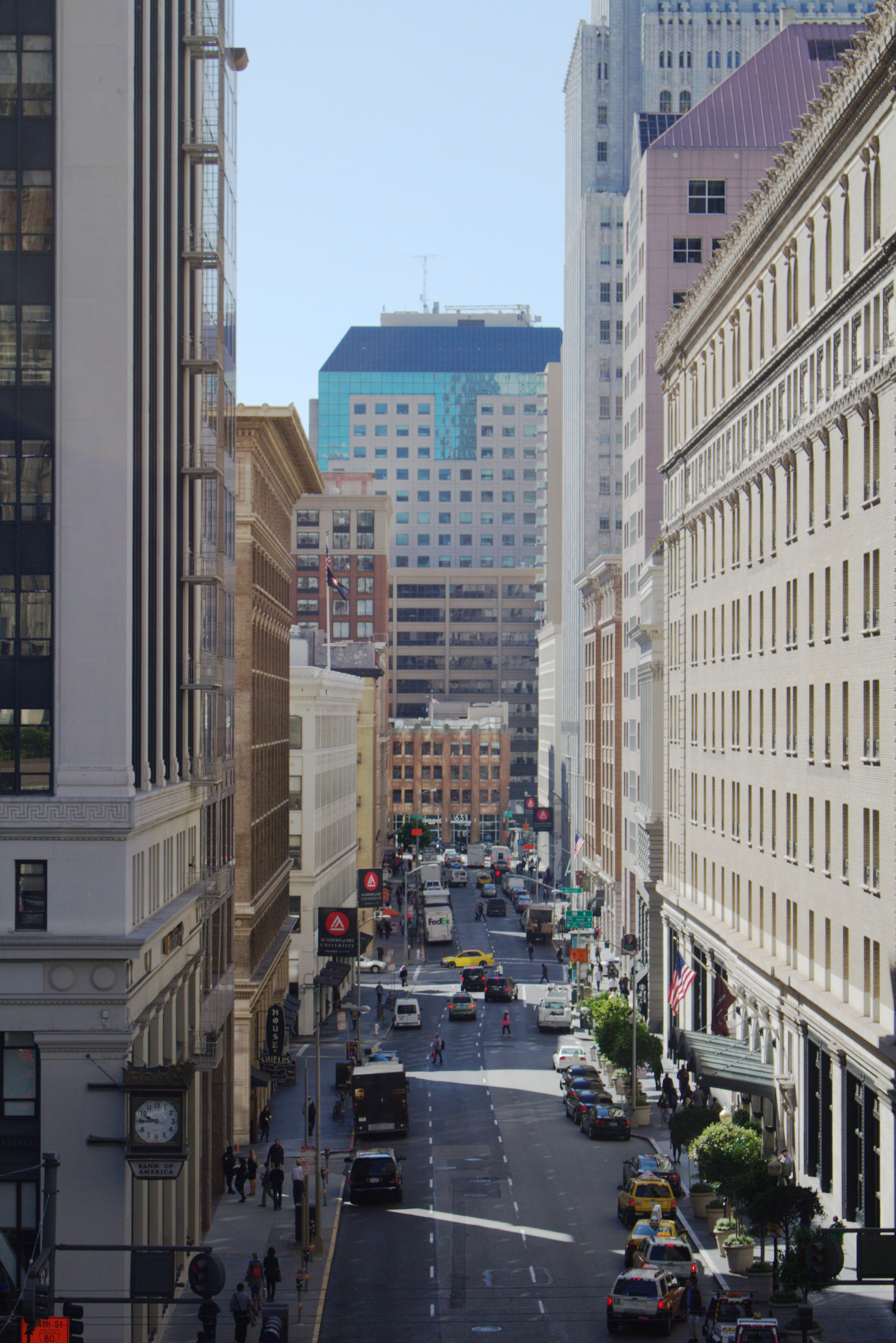
- New Montgomery Street, seen facing south across its Market Street terminus
- Interactive map of New Montgomery Street
- Location: San Francisco, California
- West end: Market Street in Union Square
- East end: Howard Street in SoMa

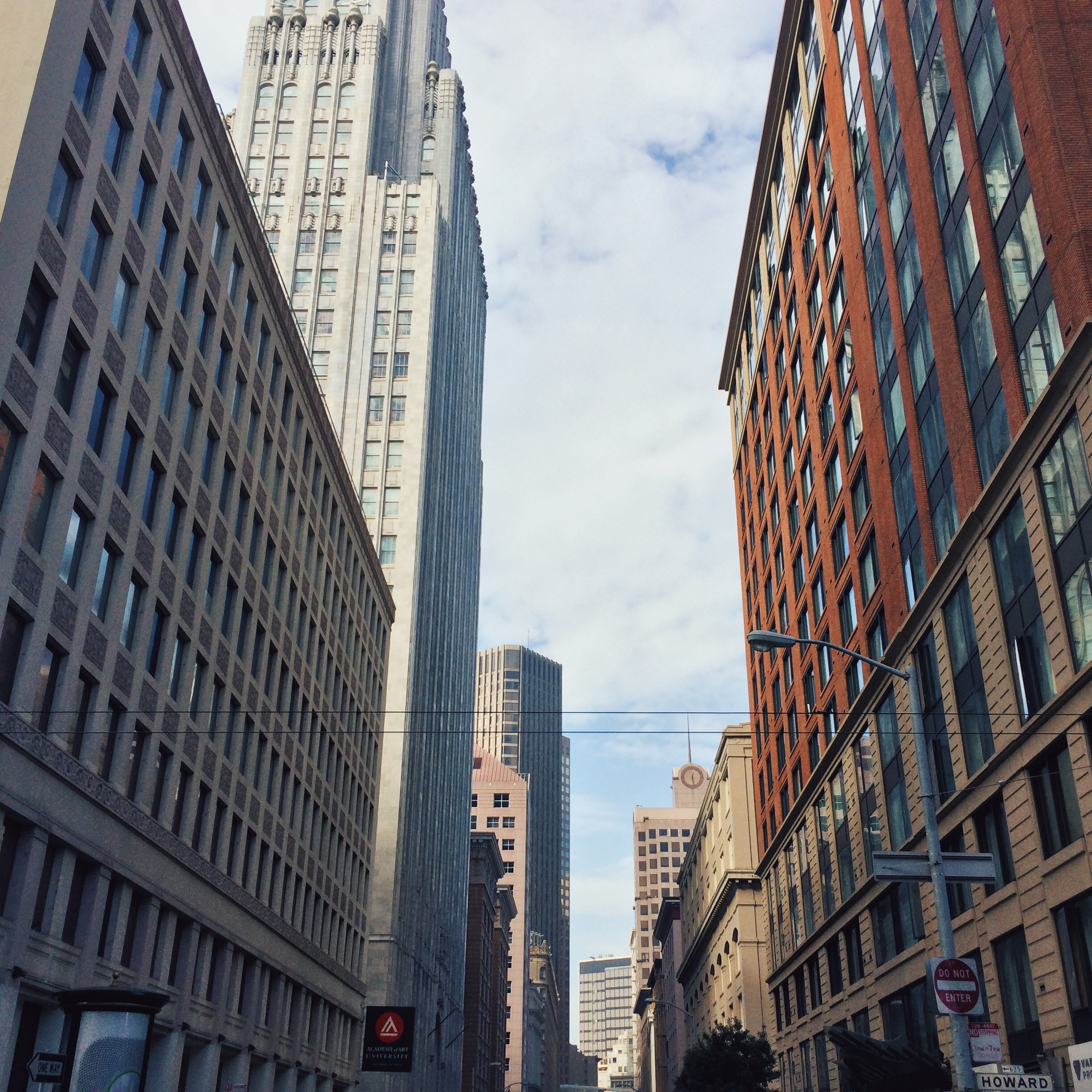
New Montgomery Street terminus facing north from Howard St

New Montgomery Street, formerly Montgomery Street South, is a street in San Francisco, California. It begins at Market Street and terminates at Howard Street in the SoMa (South of Market) district.

== History ==
Before New Montgomery Street was created, an inner street called Jane Street ran parallel to Second and Third Street. In the 1870s, Montgomery Street South was established in its place as the southern extension of Montgomery Street, one of the main thoroughfares in San Francisco's Financial District, running north from Market to Telegraph Hill. The extension was strongly supported by businessman and Bank of California founder William Ralston – who started the construction of the original Palace Hotel, at the time the largest hotel in the Western United States – in an effort to expand San Francisco's business district to the yet undeveloped area south of Market. Ralston's original plans to connect Montgomery Street to the waterfront failed due to the unwillingness of two property owners (governor Milton Latham and shipping baron John Parrott) to sell their mansions on Rincon Hill, which is why Montgomery Street South never got past Howard Street.

== Notable buildings ==
Landmarks and notable buildings along New Montgomery Street include the Palace Hotel (1875, rebuilt in 1909), the Sharon Building (1912), the Montgomery (1914, headquarters of the San Francisco Call until 1950), the Rialto Building (1902, rebuilt in 1910) and San Francisco's first skyscraper the PacBell Building (1924). Among the companies headquartered on New Montgomery Street are OpenTable, Trulia, the Wikimedia Foundation, Lumosity, Terracotta, and, as of fall 2013, Yelp. New Montgomery Street is home to the main campus of the Academy of Art University.

== Gallery ==
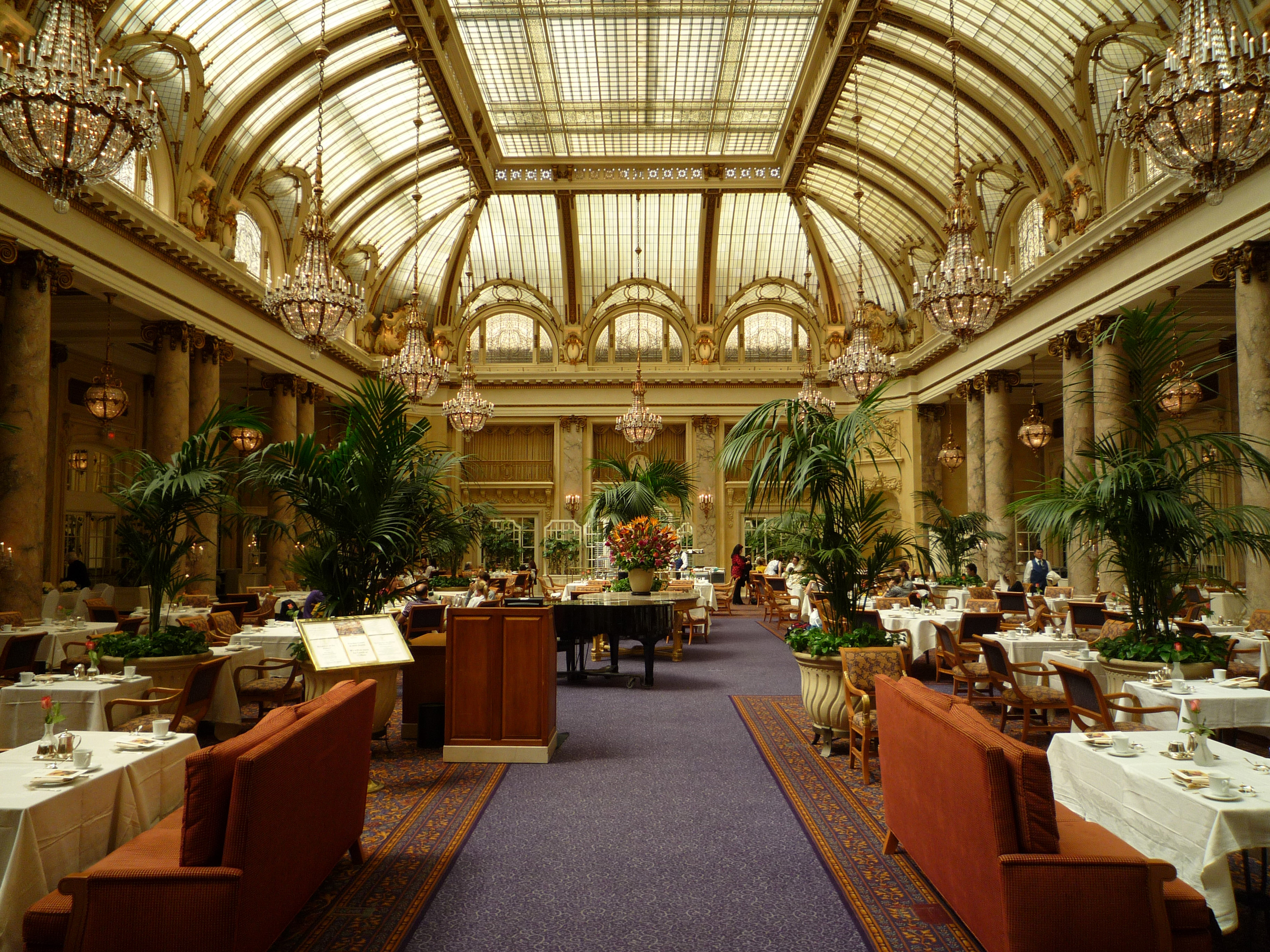
The Garden Court at Palace Hotel

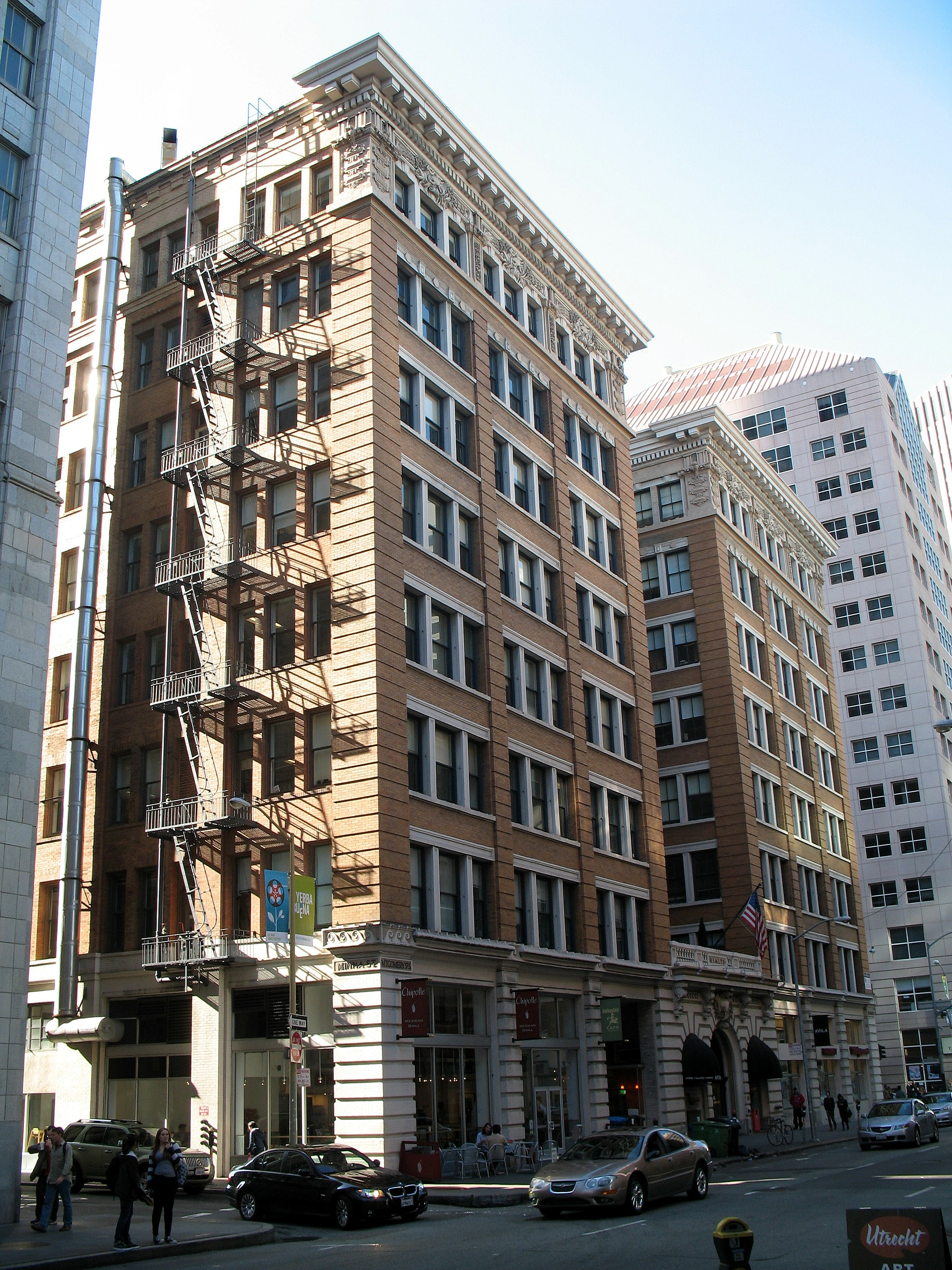
The Rialto Building

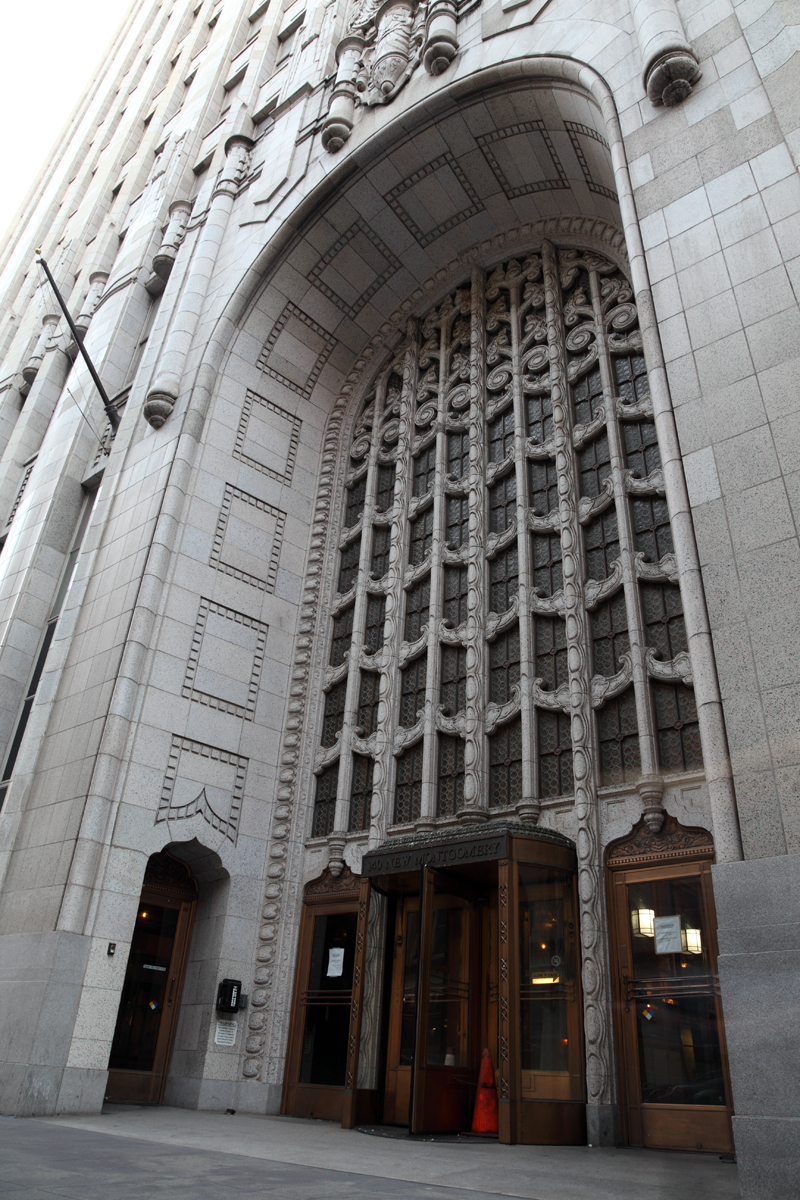
The entrance of the PacBell Building

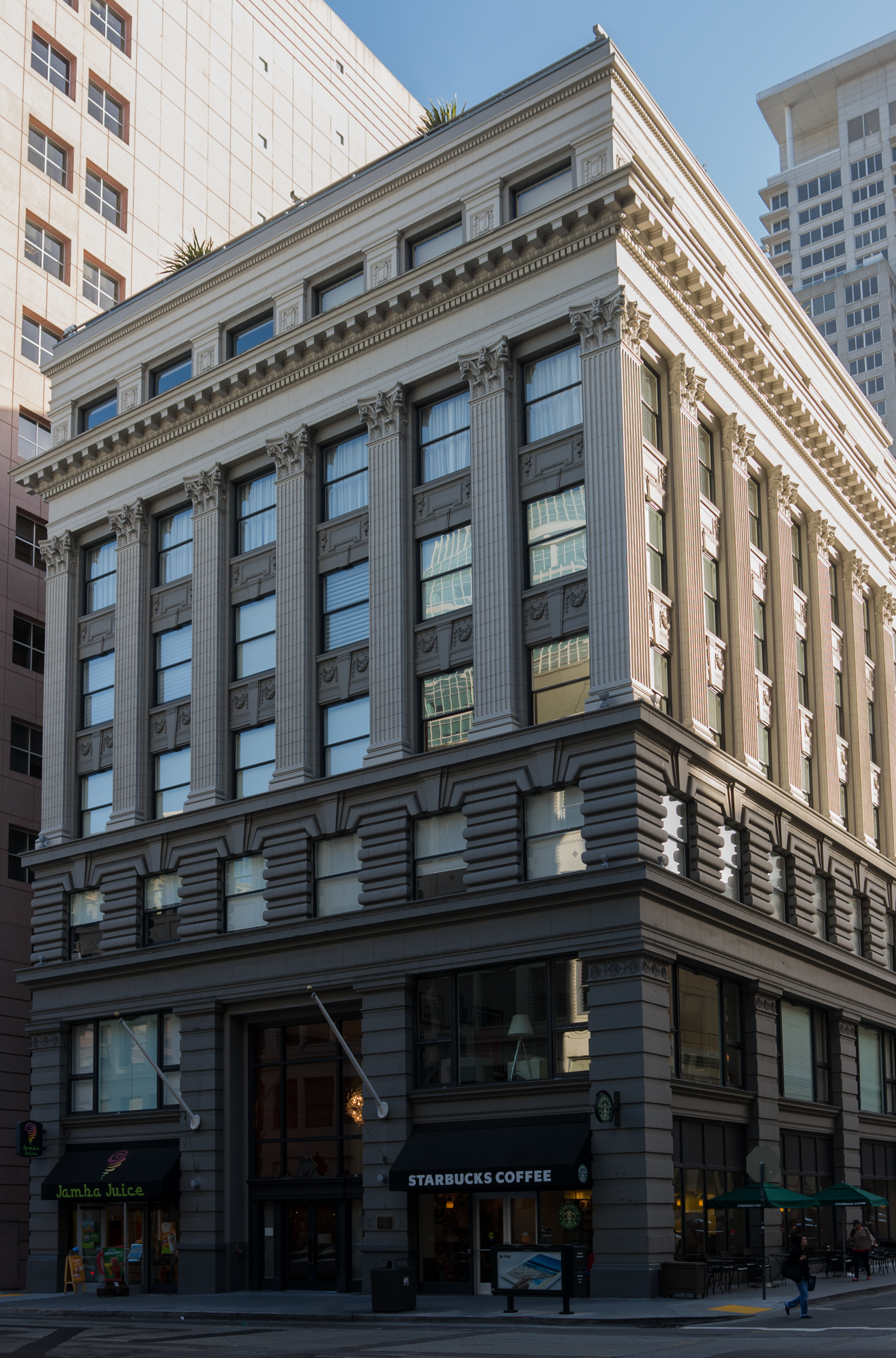
The Montgomery
