= Newspaper Row (San Francisco) =

Intersection in San Francisco, California, U.S.

Coordinates: 37°47′16.3″N 122°24′12.05″W

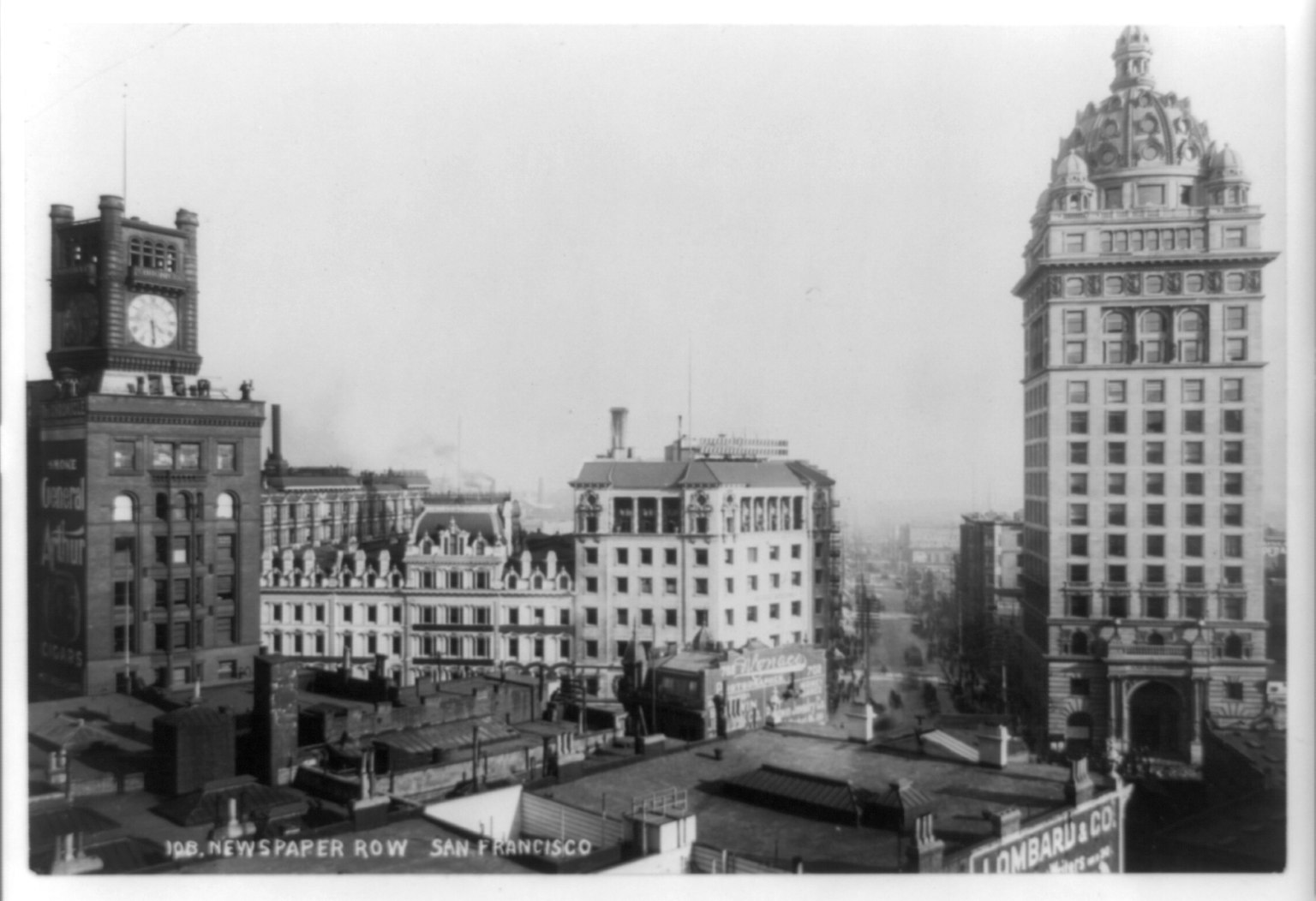
Newspaper row, 1902. Left to right, the San Francisco Chronicle, The San Francisco Examiner, and The San Francisco Call

Newspaper Row in San Francisco referred to the five-point intersection of Market Street, Kearny Street, Third Street and Geary Street, where three of San Francisco's largest daily newspapers were headquartered, across the street from each other. By 1902, The San Francisco Call, The San Francisco Examiner and the San Francisco Chronicle were in buildings on corners, with the Chronicle in the Chronicle Building, the Call in the Spreckels Building and the Examiner in the Examiner building. The intersection became known as the "Times Square of the West".

== History ==
In 1890, Newspaper Row began when the Chronicle Building, the first steel-framed building the Western United States, and the tallest building in San Francisco upon completion, was constructed. William Randolph Hearst, the owner of The San Francisco Examiner, purchased a nearby lot, where he intended to build a taller building. In 1895, Claus Spreckels began construction of the Spreckels Building for The San Francisco Call, and the five-point intersection of Market Street, Kearny Street, Third Street and Geary Street was set as the center of news in the city.

The 1906 San Francisco Fire partially destroyed Newspaper Row. The Call's Spreckels building and the Examiner's Hearst building were slowly gutted over two hours, and the Chronicle's building was similarly gutted, but the brick remained and was rebuilt. The three newspapers published a combined issue from the office of the Oakland Tribune.

== Relocation ==
In 1924, the two surviving papers later relocated to near the intersection of Fifth Street and Mission Street, The San Francisco Examiner (Fifth) and the San Francisco Chronicle (901 Mission Street) across from the San Francisco Mint.

== See also ==
- Lotta's Fountain
- Market and 3rd Street / Market and Kearny stations
