= Rule Financial =

British multinational company

- Company type: Private
- Founded: 1997
- Fate: Acquired by GFT Technologies AG
- Headquarters: London, UK
- Key people: Marcus Rule (Founder); Chris Potts (CEO)
- Products: Business consulting IT consulting IT services
- Number of employees: 810 (2014)
- Website: www.rulefinancial.com

Rule Financial was a British multinational company based in London, UK, that provided business consulting, technical consulting and IT services to investment banks, asset and wealth management and related financial institutions. Their consultants were experienced across the wholesale and investment banking domains. They were established in the key financial centres of London, New York, Boston and Toronto, and employed over 810 people worldwide in 2014. In addition to these offices, Rule Financial had specialist development centres in Poland and Costa Rica, servicing European and North American markets.

GFT Technologies AG announced the acquisition of Rule Financial in June 2014 which was merged by the end of 2014.

== History ==
Marcus Rule founded the eponymous Rule Financial in 1997 and established the company headquarters in the City of London. His vision was to build a specialist business and technology consultancy serving the needs of the global investment banking community. The business quickly grew, ultimately leading to the opening of two development centres in 2008 in Barcelona and Łódź (Poland), driven by the acquisition of Polish-based company Peer-to-Peer Systems. By 2010 Rule Financial had outgrown their London offices for the second time and moved to a new space in the heart of the City, in the same year that they were recognised in The Sunday Times Tech Track 100 for the fourth time since their inception. Growth was not confined to Rule Financial's London office, and in 2011 the Polish office expanded and moved to larger premises, reflecting overall global growth.

Subsequent expansion includes new offices in the important financial centres of Boston and Toronto (following the acquisition of The Waterline Group), whilst the addition of a second development centre, located in Poznań, underlined the company's commitment to Poland as an excellent IT nearshore location and it is currently home to more than 250 of their employees. The eighth and most recent Rule Financial office opened in early October 2013 in Heredia, Costa Rica to provide support to their clients in North America.

== Services ==
Rule Financial is an independent provider of business and IT services, focused on delivering management consulting, programme and project management, implementation services, user experience design, and technical strategy for financial services firms. Their specialists work alongside global investment banks, central counterparties, exchanges, hedge funds and other financial institutions with a view to lowering costs and improving productivity.

Business consulting is one of the key services provided by Rule Financial and involves using methods and tools to help a business define their new target operating models (TOMs) and 'change plans' to meet the needs of modern businesses. Rule Financial have developed a sophisticated roadmapping approach that has been regularly tested over many years in which dependencies and scheduling are modeled, with alternative delivery scenarios also tested to optimise a programme.

== Partnerships ==
Rule Financial have established partnerships since 1997, particularly with specialist software providers. The company has attained 'Microsoft Gold Certified Partner' status in 2009 and has retained this accreditation in subsequent years. Rule Financial is also a member of the Oracle partner network. Other partners include HTML5 runtime technology provider OpenFin, information security and compliance companies Dtex Systems and Recommind (software company).

Rule Financial have been named in The Sunday Times Tech Track 100 four times.
