= Humboldt Bank Building =

Office building in San Francisco, California

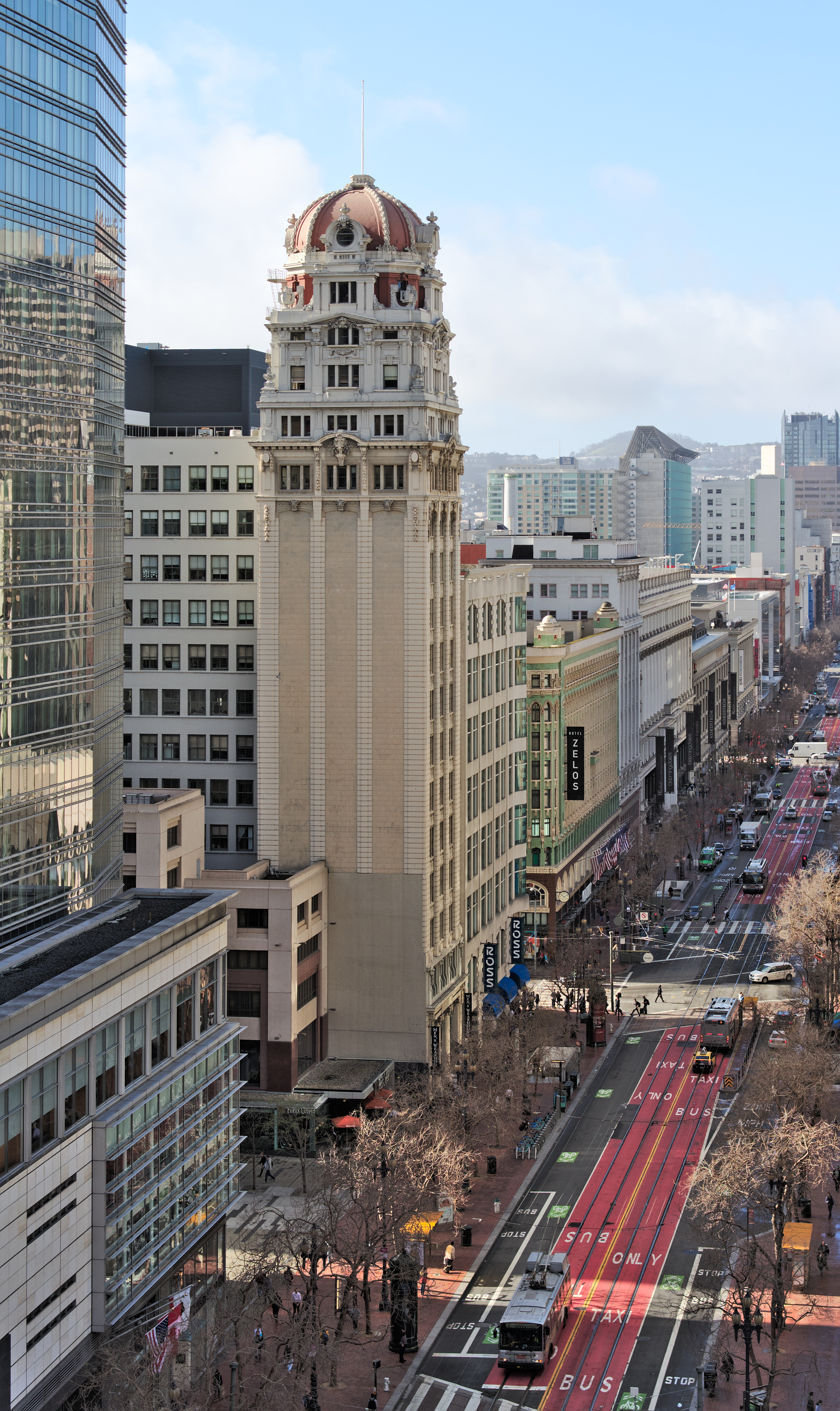

- Location within San Francisco Location within California Location within the United States
- Alternative names: Humboldt Savings Bank Building

General information
- Type: Beaux Arts
- Location: 785 Market Street; San Francisco, California
- Coordinates: 37.785932°N 122.405323°W
- Completed: 1908
- Owner: The Seligman Group

Height
- Roof: 244 ft (74 m)

Technical details
- Floor count: 19

Design and construction
- Architect: Frederick H. Meyer

The Humboldt Bank Building is a 19-floor Beaux-Arts office building at 785 Market Street and Fourth Street in San Francisco, California. It was created by the Humboldt Savings Bank, with construction beginning in 1905, derailed with the 1906 San Francisco earthquake, and then constructed again from 1907 to 1908. The architects were Frederick Herman Meyer and Micheal Smith O'Brien. The building consists granite, marble, and terra cotta tile facing over reinforced concrete and steel.

On October 17, 2024 it was announced that the building would be converted into apartments.

== History ==
The Humboldt Bank was organized in 1869. It was originally located at 4 Kearny Street, and then moved to 16 Geary Street. That property was sold in 1905 and they moved to 785 Market Street, and at that site they commissioned a new building.

The architect of the building, Fredrick Herman Meyer, constructed a new building in the Beaux-Arts style to mimic the then-called Call Tower.

Construction of the Humboldt Bank Building was already underway by the time of the 1906 San Francisco earthquake, and was derailed. Following this, the planned structure of the building was significantly changed and safety features were installed in the building, making use of the blank slate opportunity, such as a steel frame of lattice girders, one of the first in the city.

Originally, the building was to be clad in stone from Colusa County, California. However, the fact that the material spalls when exposed to heat made Meyer change the material to terracotta for the main shaft of the building. The exterior windows are formed of wire-glass, another safety measure: it prevents glass from shattering in heat. Meyer also forwent water towers, which shook loose oftentimes in an earthquake, in favor of pneumatic pumps and hoses from a water tank in the basement, keeping the structure safe in case of a fire.

The elevators were also subjected to these precautions. They often worked as fire-fueling air columns in the case of a fire. Thus, Meyer lined the shafts of the elevators in concrete and installed heat-detecting automatic doors, which would close in case of fire.

The interior was remodeled in 1920 by Smith O'Brien, who added marble and other ornamental details. At the same time, the bank itself mixed into Umpqua Bank, which later merged to Columbia Bank in 2023.

On October 17, 2024, a project was underwent to convert the historic structure from commercial office space to residential apartments, launched by Forge Development Partners. It is to become 124 mostly one-bedroom units, with a two-bedroom unit and penthouse, and ground-floor retail. There will be no changes to the exterior facade.

== See also ==
- San Francisco's tallest buildings
