= 140 New Montgomery =

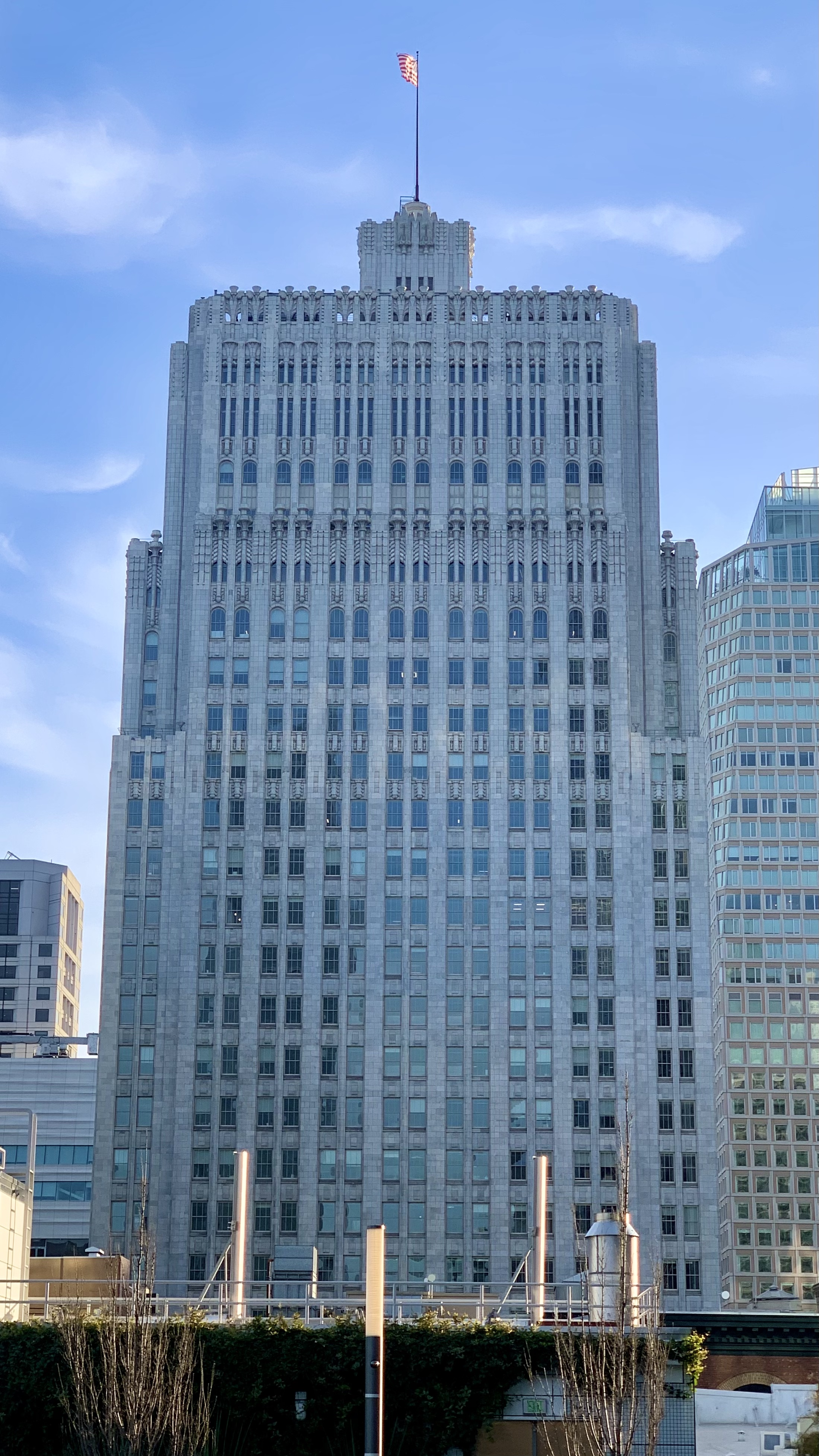
- From Salesforce Park in April 2021

- Location within San Francisco
- Former names: The Pacific Telephone & Telegraph Company Building; The Pacific Bell Building
- Alternative names: The Pacific Telephone Building; The Telephone Building; Pacific Telephone & Telegraph Co. Coast Division Offices

Record height
- Preceded by: 225 Bush Street
- Surpassed by: Russ Building

General information
- Type: Mixed-use
- Architectural style: Art Deco
- Location: 140 New Montgomery Street; San Francisco, California
- Coordinates: 37°47′13″N 122°24′00″W
- Construction started: January 1, 1924; 102 years ago
- Completed: 1925
- Opened: May 30, 1925
- Renovated: 1980s (façade)
- Cost: US$4 million (equivalent to $73.43 million in 2025)
- Owner: Pembroke Real Estate Inc.

Height
- Architectural: 435 feet (132.7 meters)
- Tip: 460 ft (140.2 m)
- Antenna spire: 460 ft (140.2 m)
- Roof: 435 ft (132.6 m)
- Top floor: 413 ft (125.9 m)

Dimensions
- Other dimensions: 147.00 ft (44.81 m) length x 160.00 ft (48.77 m) width

Technical details
- Structural system: steel
- Floor count: 26
- Floor area: 295,000 sq ft (27,400 m^{2})
- Lifts/elevators: 10

Design and construction
- Architects: James R. Miller; Timothy L. Pflueger; A. A. (Alexander Aimwell) Cantin
- Architecture firm: Miller and Pflueger
- Designations: San Francisco Category I Historic Building; LEED Gold

Website
- 140NM.com

140 New Montgomery Street is a 26-floor Art Deco mixed-use office tower located in San Francisco's South of Market district, close to the St. Regis Museum Tower and the San Francisco Museum of Modern Art. Constructed in 1925 as a modern headquarters for The Pacific Telephone & Telegraph Co., it was originally known as The Pacific Telephone & Telegraph Company Building or simply the Telephone Building, and, after 1984, as The Pacific Bell Building or The PacBell Building.

When it opened on May 30, 1925, The Pacific Telephone Building was San Francisco's first significant skyscraper development, and was the tallest building in San Francisco, until the Russ Building matched its height in 1927 at the time of its completion. The building was the first high-rise south of Market Street, and along with the Russ Building, remained the city's tallest until it was overtaken by 650 California Street in 1964. It was the first high rise located on the west coast to be occupied solely by a single tenant.

AT&T sold the building in 2007. As of 2013, Internet company Yelp was the main tenant. Yelp moved out in 2021 following a rise in remote work during the COVID-19 pandemic.

== History ==
The building was designed to consolidate numerous smaller buildings and outdated offices into a modern headquarters for The Pacific Telephone & Telegraph Co., and as a result, was designated as the Pacific Telephone & Telegraph Co. Coast Division Offices by the company, though referred to colloquially as The Telephone Building.

The building's architecture was influenced by Eliel Saarinen's Tribune Tower design, in particular regarding the setbacks on the higher floors.

In reference to the Bell System, of which The Pacific Telephone & Telegraph Co. was a member of at the time of construction, the façade featured bell motifs in many locations, most notably surrounding the arch over the main entrance doors on New Montgomery Street. The decorations near the base and in the lobby also include references to the candlestick telephone and the pneumatic tube, some of the most modern communication technologies in use at the time. After the breakup of the Bell System (AT&T) in 1984, and the formation the Regional Bell Operating Companies, also known as the Baby Bells, Pacific Telephone changed its name to Pacific Bell.

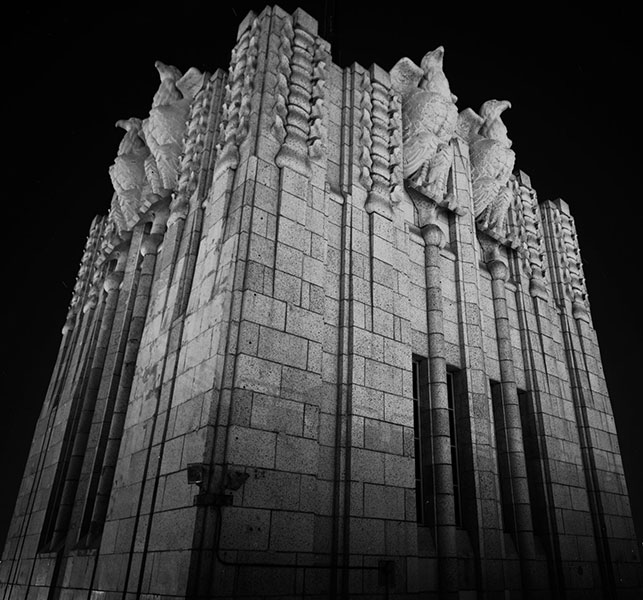
140 New Montgomery eagles

Statues of eight eagles (each 13 feet (4.0 m) in height) perch atop the tower's crown. The building has an L—shaped floor plan, and the architecture decoratively incorporates spotlights to show the exterior's terra cotta ornamentation day and night. The lobby is decorated with images of plants, clouds, unicorns, and phoenixes and has a plaster ceiling inspired by Chinese brocade.

In 1929, Sir Winston Churchill visited the building and made his first transatlantic telephone call, phoning his London home.

For 44 years until 1978, the top of the roof was used to convey official storm warnings to sailors at the direction of the United States National Weather Service, in the form of a 25 feet (7.6 metres) long triangular red flag by day, and a red light at night.

The 1989 Loma Prieta earthquake did only minor damage to the building, affecting parts of the terracotta cladding and requiring the eight eagle sculptures to be replaced with fiberglass replicas.

=== In the 21st century ===
In 2006, AT&T moved out of the building, following its merger with SBC Communications. In 2007, the PacBell Building was sold by AT&T to Stockbridge Capital Group and Wilson Meany Sullivan for US$118 million. In 2008, the new owners filed plans to convert the tower into 118 luxury condominiums. However, those plans were put on hold during the 2008 financial crisis, and the building sat empty for nearly six years.

Following a surge in office demand in 2010–2011, Wilson Meany Sullivan changed the plans back to office space. Major renovation work began in February 2012, to improve the building's seismic performance, install all–new mechanical, electric, plumbing and fire sprinkler systems, and preserve and restore the building's historic lobby, at an estimated cost of US$80–100 million. In 2012, Yelp announced it had signed a lease on the building's 100,000 square feet (9,300 m^{2}) of office space through 2020. After two expansions, the company held a total of almost 150,000 square feet (14,000 m^{2}) on 13 floors in the fall 2015.

In April 2016, Pembroke Real Estate Inc., a Boston–based REIT, acquired 140 New Montgomery as part of its portfolio — its second acquisition in San Francisco. According to property records, Pembroke paid US$284 million for the property, at around US$962 per square foot.

In 2021, Yelp did not renew its 2011 lease, and instead subleased a smaller space at nearby 350 Mission Street, due to the rise of remote work in the COVID-19 pandemic. As of May 2023, during what the San Francisco Chronicle described as "Downtown San Francisco['s] worst office vacancy crisis on record," the building had a vacancy rate of 32.9%.

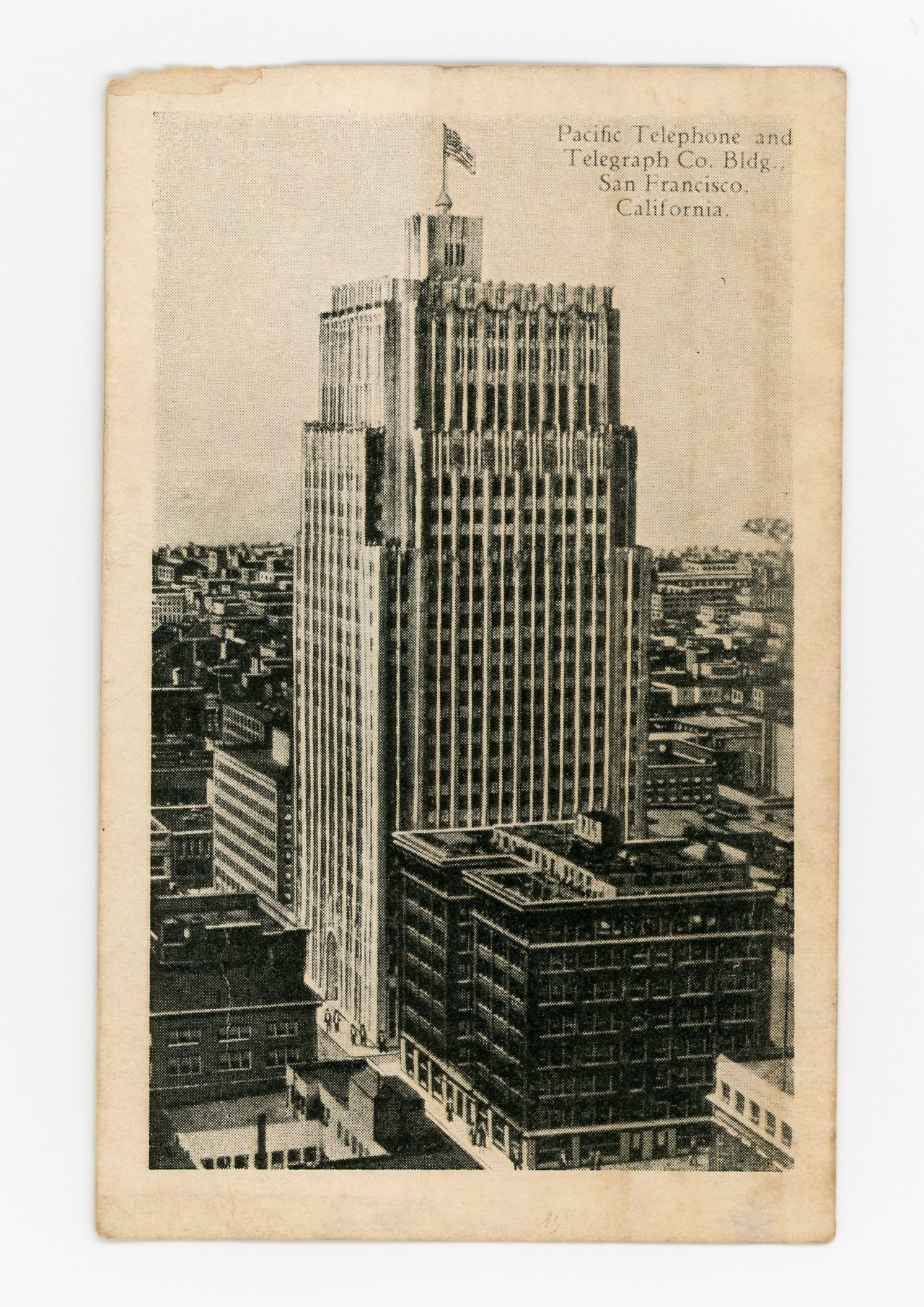
Souvenir Photo (1927)

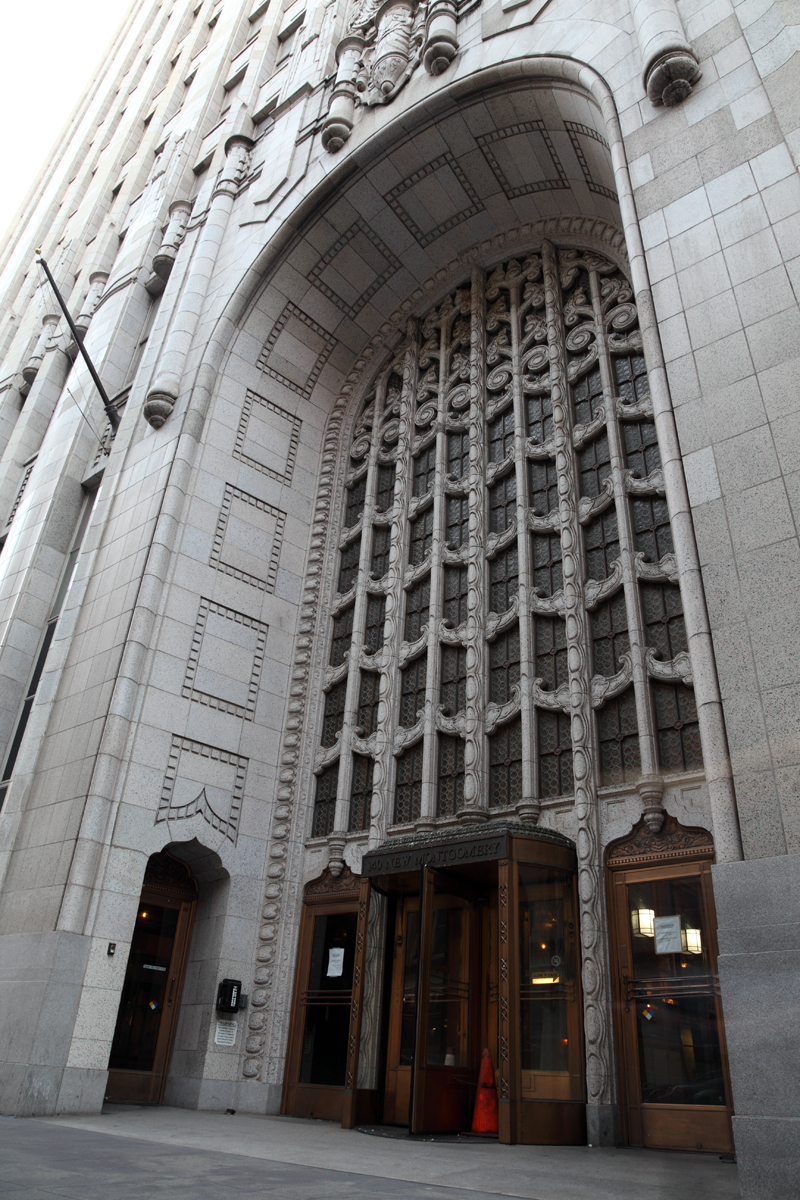
140 New Montgomery entrance

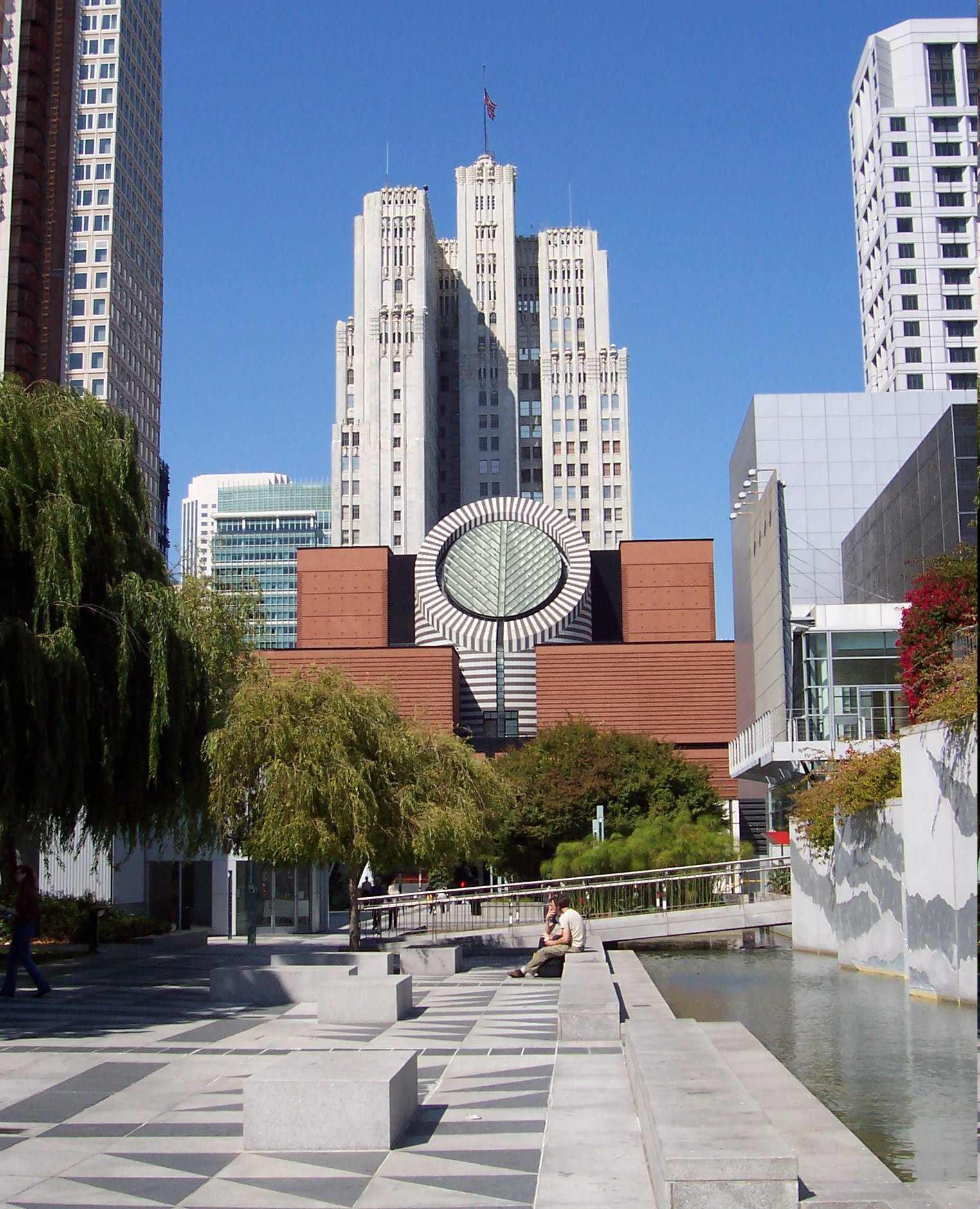
The building as seen from Yerba Buena Gardens, rising behind the San Francisco Museum of Modern Art

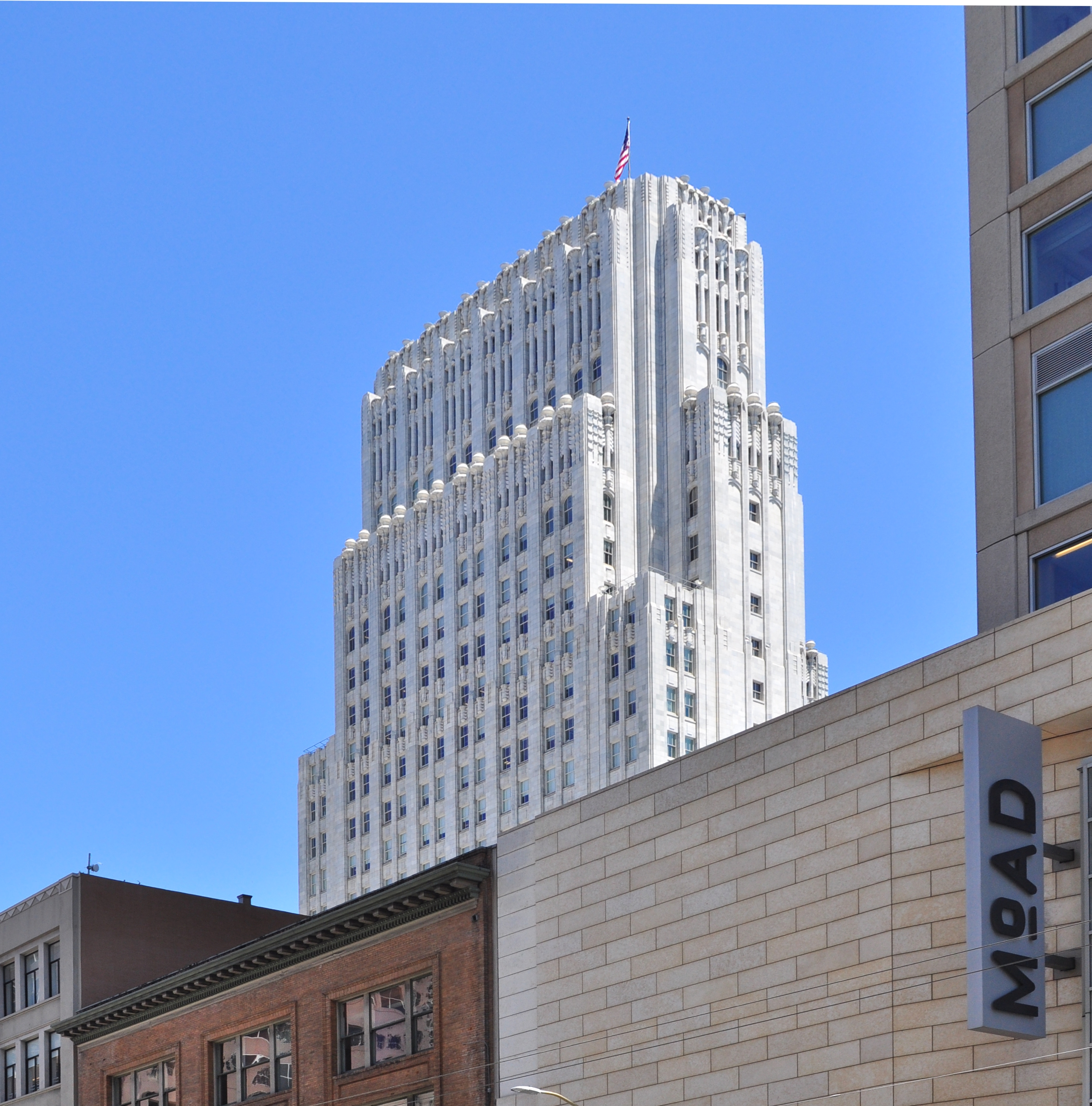
View from Market Street

== See also ==
- South of Market, San Francisco (SOMA)
- Russ Building
- List of tallest buildings in San Francisco
