= Russ Building =

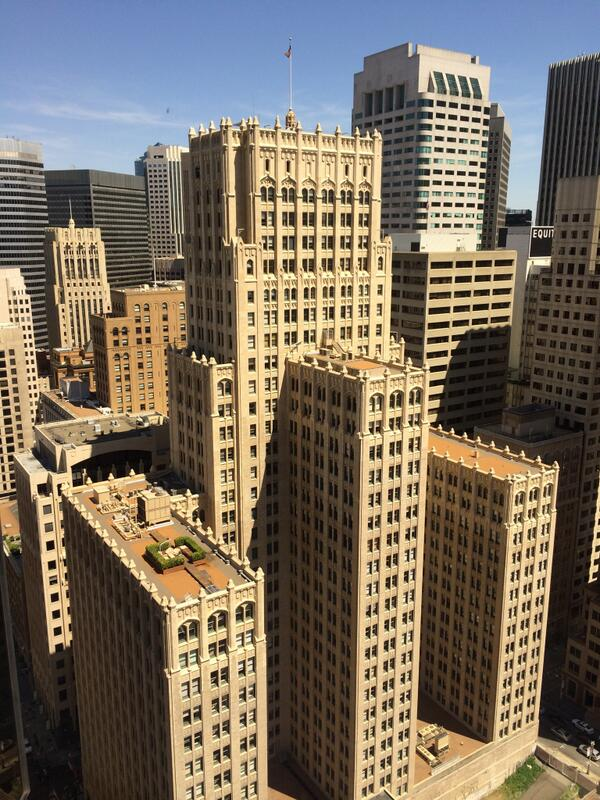
- Russ Building, 235 Montgomery St, San Francisco, CA 94104

- Location within San Francisco Russ Building (California) Russ Building (the United States)
- Alternative names: The Skyscraper

Record height
- Preceded by: Pacific Telephone Building
- Surpassed by: Hartford Building

General information
- Status: Completed
- Type: Commercial offices
- Location: 235 Montgomery Street; San Francisco, California
- Coordinates: 37.7912°N 122.4028°W
- Completed: 1927
- Owner: The Swig Company
- Management: Shorenstein Properties

Height
- Antenna spire: 132.6 m (435 ft)
- Roof: 127.4 m (418 ft)

Technical details
- Floor count: 32
- Floor area: 511,329 sq ft (47,504.0 m^{2})
- Lifts/elevators: 15

Design and construction
- Architect: George W. Kelham
- Structural engineer: H.J. Brunnier Associates
- Main contractor: Dinwiddie Construction

The Russ Building is a Neo-Gothic office tower located in the Financial District of San Francisco, California. It was designed by architect George W. Kelham, who was responsible for many of San Francisco's other prominent high-rise buildings in the 1920s. The 133-metre (436 ft) building was completed in 1927 and had 32 floors as well as the city's first indoor parking garage. It was the tallest building in San Francisco from 1927 to 1964 and one of the most prominent, along with its 133-metre (436 ft) "twin", the PacBell Building to the south.

Upon completion, the building was iconic enough that Architect and Engineer wrote, “In nearly every large city there is one building that because of its size, beauty of architectural design and character of its use and occupancy, has come to typify the city itself ... Today the Russ Building takes this place in San Francisco. By its size and location and by the character of its tenants the building becomes indeed—'The Center of Western Progress'.”

However, Manhattanization from 1960 to 1990 has shrouded the tower in a shell of skyscrapers, removing the tower's prominence.

The San Francisco Chronicle's architecture critic John King described the Russ Building as "the embodiment of Jazz Age romance, a full block of ornate Gothic-flavored masonry that ascends in jagged stages from Montgomery Street with a leap and then a scramble to a central crown". The tower is a California Historical Landmark.

Until the emergence of Sand Hill Road in the 1980s, many of the largest venture capital firms held offices in the Russ Building.

== See also ==
- Eliel Saarinen's Tribune Tower design
- PacBell Building
- List of tallest buildings in San Francisco
