= 225 Bush Street =

Building in San Francisco

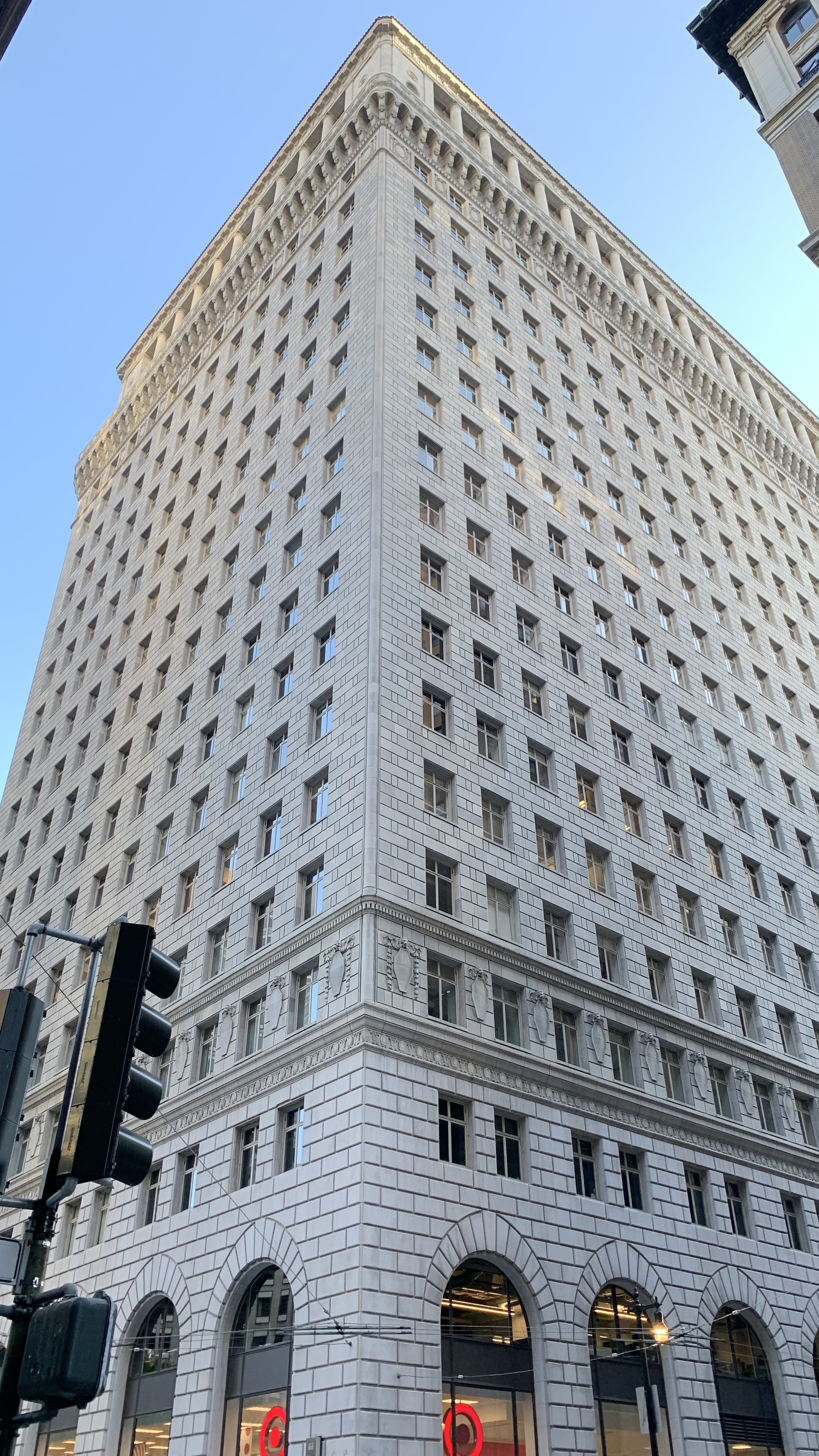
- In 2021

- Location within San Francisco
- Former names: Standard Oil Building

Record height
- Preceded by: Call Building
- Surpassed by: Pacific Telephone Building

General information
- Type: Commercial offices
- Location: 225 Bush Street; San Francisco, California
- Coordinates: 37.79086°N 122.40147°W
- Completed: 1922
- Owner: Kylli Inc. Flynn Properties, Inc.

Height
- Roof: 328 ft (100 m)

Technical details
- Floor count: 22
- Floor area: 559,723 sq ft (52,000.0 m^{2})

Design and construction
- Architect: George W. Kelham
- Main contractor: Dinwiddie Construction Company

225 Bush Street, originally known as the Standard Oil Building, is a 328-foot (100 m), 25-floor office building in the financial district of San Francisco. The building includes 21 floors of office space, 1 floor of retail, 1 storage floor and 2 basement levels including the garage. It was the tallest building in the city from its completion in 1922 until 1925.

It contains approximately 560,000 sq ft (52,000 m^{2}) of rentable space. It is a historic building, serving as the headquarters for Standard Oil of California, now Chevron, for over half a century. Architect George W. Kelham designed the Standard Oil Building for John D. Rockefeller and modeled it on the Federal Reserve Bank of New York Building. Composed of two buildings, the old wing was built in the 1920s. The new wing was built in the 1950s.

== Tenants ==
Tenants include:

- Outbrain
- Blue Shield of California
- General Assembly
- Heap (HQ)
- Handshake (HQ)
- Khoros (former HQ)
- LendUp (HQ)
- Twitch
- Meltwater (HQ)
- Benefit Cosmetics (HQ)
- Ginger.io (HQ)
- TinyCo (HQ)
- RocketSpace
- LiveRamp (HQ)
- Synergy (HQ)
- Mercari
- SmartRecruiters
- SpringerNature
- Sunrun (HQ)

== See also ==
- Market Center (San Francisco)
