= Financial District, San Francisco =

Financial District
- Neighborhood
- San Francisco Financial District as seen from Buena Vista Park
- Nicknames: "FiDi", "Downtown"
- Location within San Francisco
- Coordinates: 37.7952°N 122.4029°W
- Country: United States
- State: California
- City-county: San Francisco

Government
  - Supervisor: Julie Christensen
  - Assemblymember: Matt Haney (D)
  - State senator: Scott Wiener (D)
  - U.S. rep.: Nancy Pelosi (D)

Area
  - Total: 0.460 sq mi (1.19 km^{2})
  - Land: 0.460 sq mi (1.19 km^{2})

Population
  - Total: 9,447
  - Density: 20,500/sq mi (7,930/km^{2})
- Time zone: UTC−8 (Pacific)
  - Summer (DST): UTC−7 (PDT)
- ZIP codes: 94104, 94108, 94111, 94133
- Area codes: 415/6 28

The Financial District is a neighborhood in San Francisco, California, United States, that serves as its main central business district and had 372,829 jobs according to U.S. census tracts as of 2012–2016. It is home to the city's largest concentration of corporate headquarters, law firms, insurance companies, real estate firms, savings and loan banks, and other financial institutions. Multiple Fortune 500 companies headquartered in San Francisco have their offices in the Financial District, including Wells Fargo, Salesforce, and Gap.

Since the 1980s, restrictions on high-rise construction have shifted new development to the adjacent South of Market (SoMa) area surrounding the Transbay Transit Center. This area is sometimes called the South Financial District by real estate developers, or simply included as part of the Financial District itself.

The 2020s have seen high office vacancy rates in the Financial District since the COVID-19 pandemic, attributed to the accelerating exodus out of the downtown core, particularly by retail and tech companies.

The area is marked by a cluster of high-rise towers in the triangular area east of Kearny Street, south of Washington Street, west of the Embarcadero that rings the waterfront, and north of Market Street. The district includes the Transamerica Pyramid, formerly San Francisco's tallest building. Montgomery Street (sometimes called "Wall Street of the West") is considered the traditional heart of the district.

== History ==
Under Spanish and Mexican rule, the area had been the site of a harbor named Yerba Buena Cove with a small civilian outpost named Yerba Buena that served to support the military population of the Presidio and the Mission Dolores. The sandy, marshy soils of the tip of the San Francisco Peninsula discouraged the Spanish, and later Mexican governments from establishing a preeminent town there, who focused their pueblo settlement efforts in the Pueblo of San José with its extremely fertile land. It was not until 1835 that the first settlers established themselves on the shore of Yerba Buena Cove, with the first town plan surveyed in 1839. Yerba Buena's potential as a seaport made it the eventual center for European and American settlement.

After gold was discovered in the Sierra Nevada Foothills in 1848, Yerba Buena's location on the natural harbor of San Francisco Bay acted as a magnet for European and American settlers, as well as gold and job seekers from a multitude of countries. Following Californian independence and American annexation and the California Gold Rush, the area boomed rapidly and the Bay shoreline, which originally ended near Montgomery Street, was filled in and extended to The Embarcadero. Gold Rush wealth and business made it the financial capital of the west coast as many banks and businesses set up in the neighborhood. The west coast's first and only skyscrapers, were built in the area along Market Street.

The neighborhood was nearly completely destroyed in the 1906 Earthquake and Fire, as the area's skyscrapers survived. By 1910, the area was largely rebuilt with low-rise, masonry-clad buildings ranging from six to twelve stories in height. During the late 1920s, several Neo-Gothic high rises, reaching 300 to 400 feet in height, were constructed, including the Standard Oil Building, Russ Building, Hunter-Dulin Building, Shell Building, and the Pacific Telephone Building.

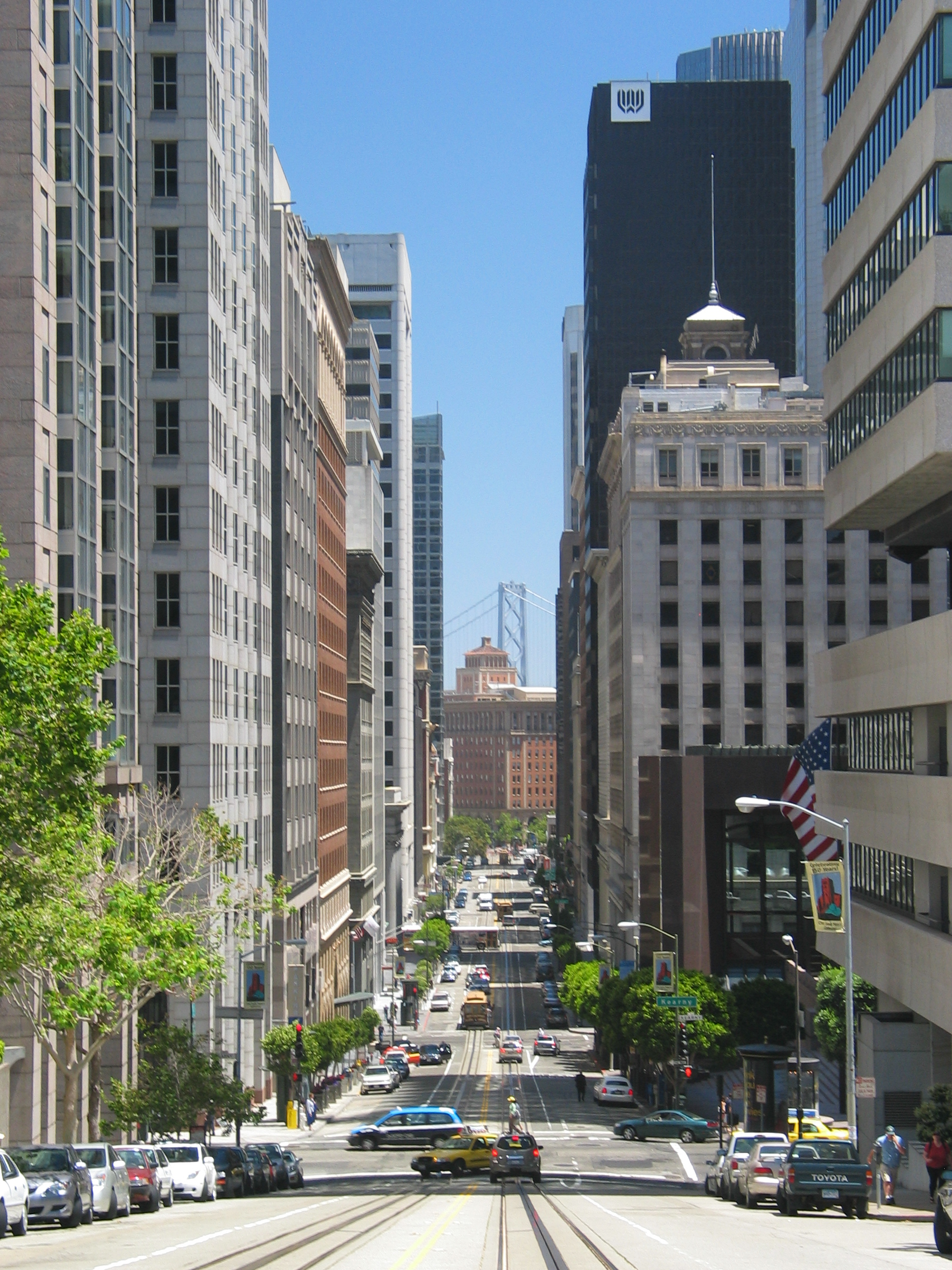
The Financial District, looking east down California Street

With the onset of the Great Depression and statewide height restrictions due to earthquake fears, few new buildings were constructed, and the district remained relatively low-rise until the late 1950s. Due to new building and earthquake retrofitting technologies, the height restrictions were lifted, fueling a skyscraper building boom. This boom accelerated under mayor Dianne Feinstein during the 1980s, something her critics labeled "Manhattanization". This caused widespread opposition citywide leading to the "skyscraper revolt" similar to the "freeway revolt" in the city years earlier. The skyscraper revolt led to the city imposing extremely strict, European-style height restrictions on building construction citywide.

Due to these height restrictions, lack of buildable lots, and changes in the local real estate market, new development in the area has shifted to South of Market Street since the 1980s. The area south of Market, east of Third Street, north of Folsom Street, and west of the Embarcadero is sometimes called the South Financial District, or simply included as part of the Financial District itself. To encourage new development south of Market, and to help fund the replacement for the Transbay Terminal, many height limits were raised in the area. As a result, nearly all new high rise construction since the 1980s (and for the foreseeable future) has taken place South of Market.

According to TRI Commercial, the traditional Financial District provides approximately 30 million square feet (2,800,000 m^{2}) of office space, and the South Financial District offers about 28 million square feet (2,600,000 m^{2}).

In the 2020s, the COVID-19 pandemic stimulated an exodus of business from the downtown core of San Francisco. By 2024, the average sale price of office towers in the Financial District had fallen to around $310 per square foot from $800 before the pandemic. Successive owners of office buildings and hotels defaulted on their loans, raising concerns about the effect on San Francisco's tax revenues and the financial stability of local government services.

== Location ==
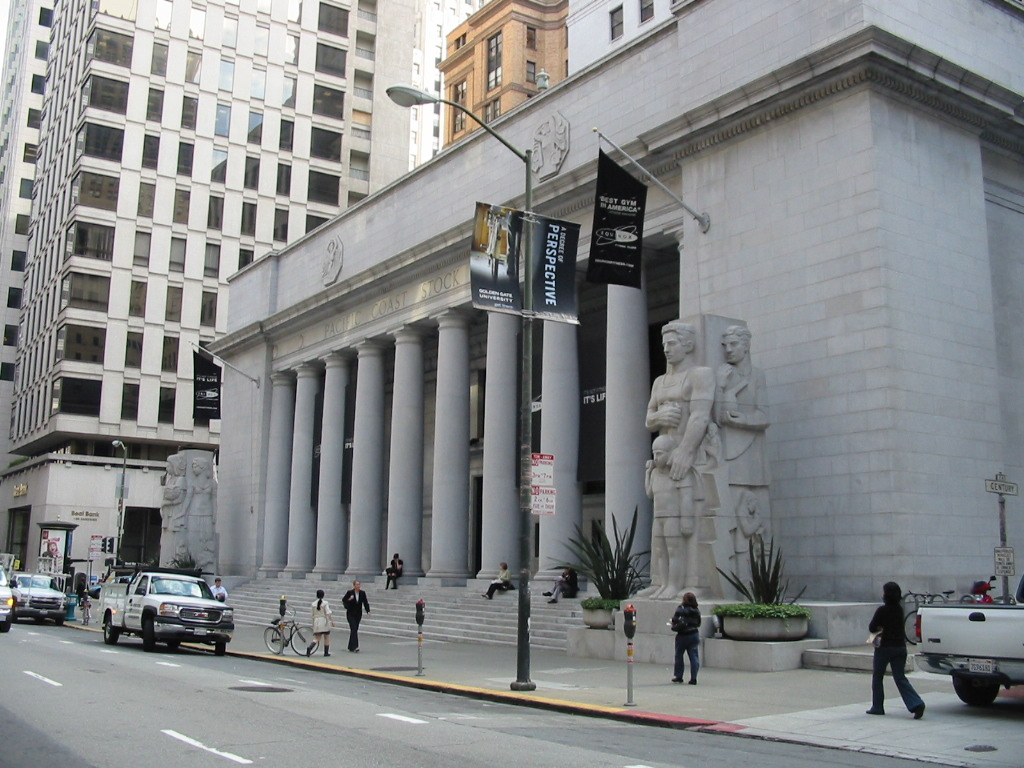
The former Pacific Stock Exchange on Pine Street in the Financial District

Adjacent to the Financial District to the west is the Union Square shopping district. To the northwest is Chinatown, and to the north is North Beach and Jackson Square. To the east lies the Embarcadero waterfront and the Ferry Building. To the south lies Market Street and the South of Market district.

The Financial District is served by more than two dozen Muni bus and rail lines, including one cable car line, as well as Montgomery Street Station and Embarcadero Station in the BART system.

The nickname "FiDi" is occasionally employed, analogous to nearby SoMa. The area is commonly referred to as "Downtown" as well, although "Downtown" may include the broader Union Square, Chinatown, Tenderloin, and SoMa districts as well.

== Characteristics ==
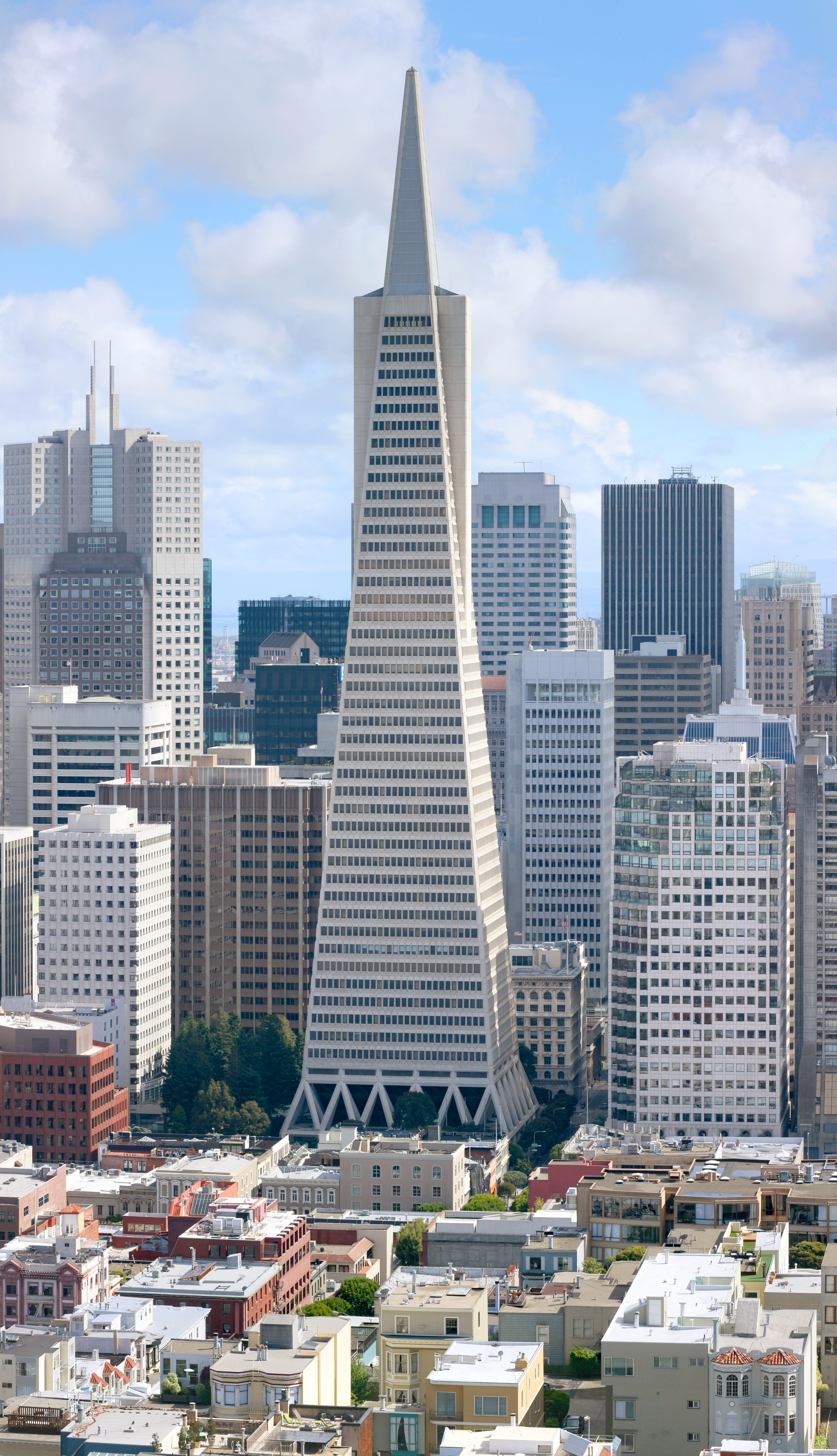
The Transamerica Pyramid was the tallest building in San Francisco from 1972 until 2017, when it was surpassed by the Salesforce Tower.

The District is home to numerous corporate headquarters, including half of San Francisco's eight Fortune 500 companies—Wells Fargo, Salesforce, Visa, and Gap— as well as Levi Strauss, Kimpton Hotels, Dodge & Cox, Prologis, Docusign, Yelp, and SoFi among others; and formerly Bank of America, Bechtel, Pacific Bell, Crocker Bank, Transamerica, Chevron, PG&E, McKesson, URS, and Charles Schwab among others. The headquarters of the 12th district of the United States Federal Reserve is located in the area as well. Prior to their disestablishment, AirTouch, South Pacific Air Lines, Pegasus Aviation Finance Company, and the Pacific Exchange all had their headquarters in the Financial District.

There are several shopping malls in the area, including the Crocker Galleria, the Embarcadero Center, the Ferry Building Marketplace, and the Rincon Center complex. Parks and plazas located there include Sue Bierman Park; Justin Herman Plaza, and Transamerica Redwood Park. St. Mary's Square and Portsmouth Square are near the borders of the district, but are usually considered as part of Chinatown.

== Diplomatic missions ==
Several consulates are located in the financial district. Countries with consulates in the Financial District include France, Brazil, Guatemala, Japan, Luxembourg, Mexico, Ireland, the Netherlands, Singapore, and the United Kingdom. The Hong Kong Economic and Trade Office and the Taipei Economic and Cultural Office is located in the Financial District.

== See also ==
- 49-Mile Scenic Drive
- History of the west coast of North America
- List of tallest buildings in San Francisco
- List of companies based in San Francisco
- 555 California Street
