= Shell Building (San Francisco) =

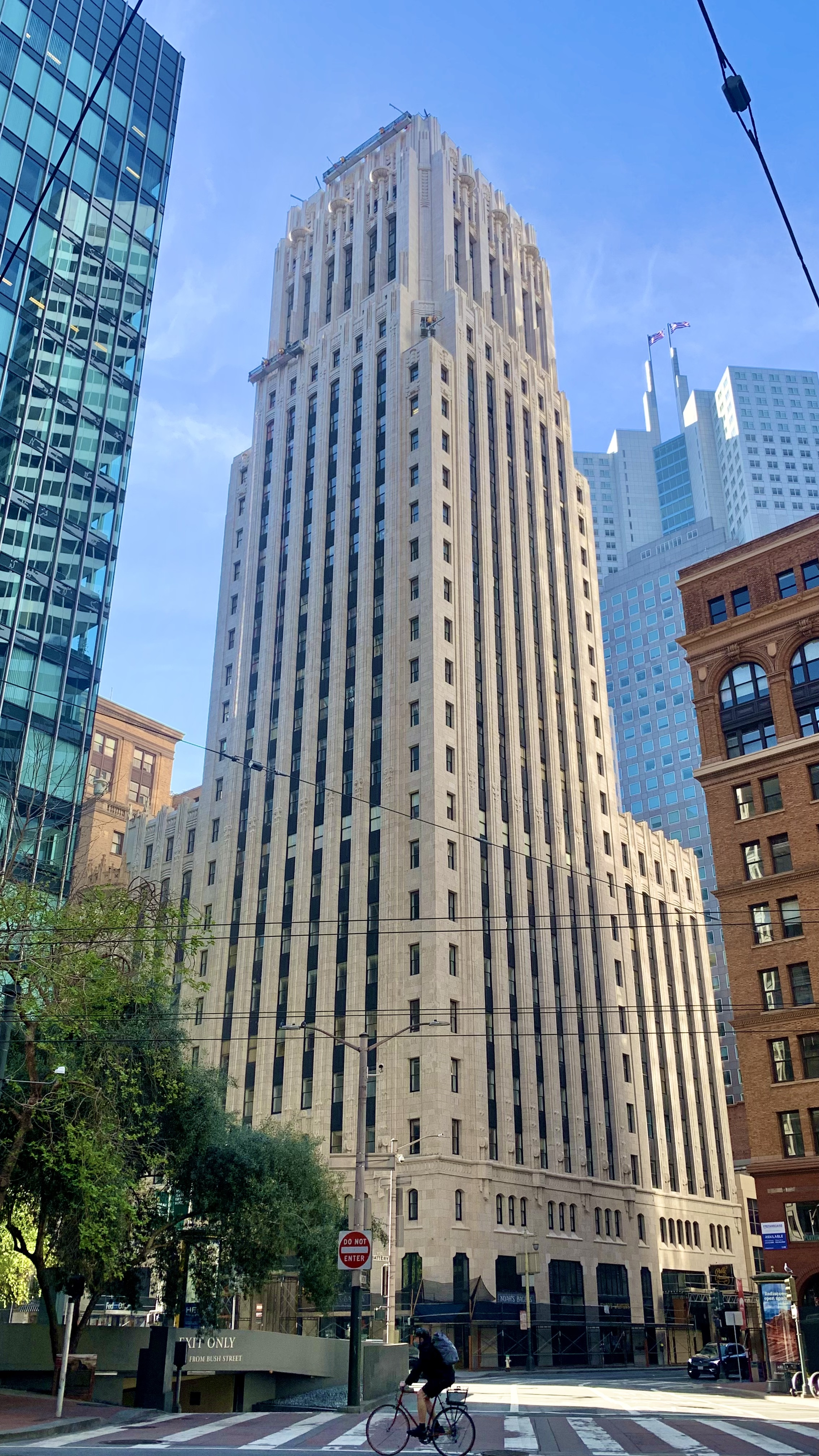
- View of the building in 2021

- Location within San Francisco Shell Building (California) Shell Building (the United States)

General information
- Type: Commercial offices
- Location: 100 Bush Street; San Francisco, California
- Coordinates: 37.7915°N 122.3999°W
- Completed: 1929
- Owner: Brothers International Holdings Corp.
- Management: 100 Bush Corporation Ltd.

Height
- Roof: 115.22 m (378.0 ft)

Technical details
- Floor count: 29
- Floor area: 246,000 sq ft (22,900 m^{2})

Design and construction
- Architects: George W. Kelham; Heller Manus Architects
- Structural engineer: H.J. Brunnier Associates

Website
- brothersintl.com/shell

The Shell Building is an office tower in the Financial District of San Francisco, California. The 28-story, 115.22 m (378.0 ft), building is located at 100 Bush Street, at Battery Street. It was designed by George W. Kelham and built in 1929, in the architectural style of Gothic Moderne, Moderne and Art Deco.

== Overview ==
Shell USA occupied the building until the 1960s. There are castings of shells that decorate the cornice on the upper levels as well as shell designs in the lobby floor and decorative grill at the front of the building.

A renovation by Heller Manus Architects won the San Francisco Architectural Heritage Award in 1994.

The Shell Building is visible in the background of the rooftop scene at the end of the 1997 movie The Game.

== See also ==
- Eliel Saarinen's Tribune Tower design
- List of tallest buildings in San Francisco
