= Central Tower (San Francisco) =

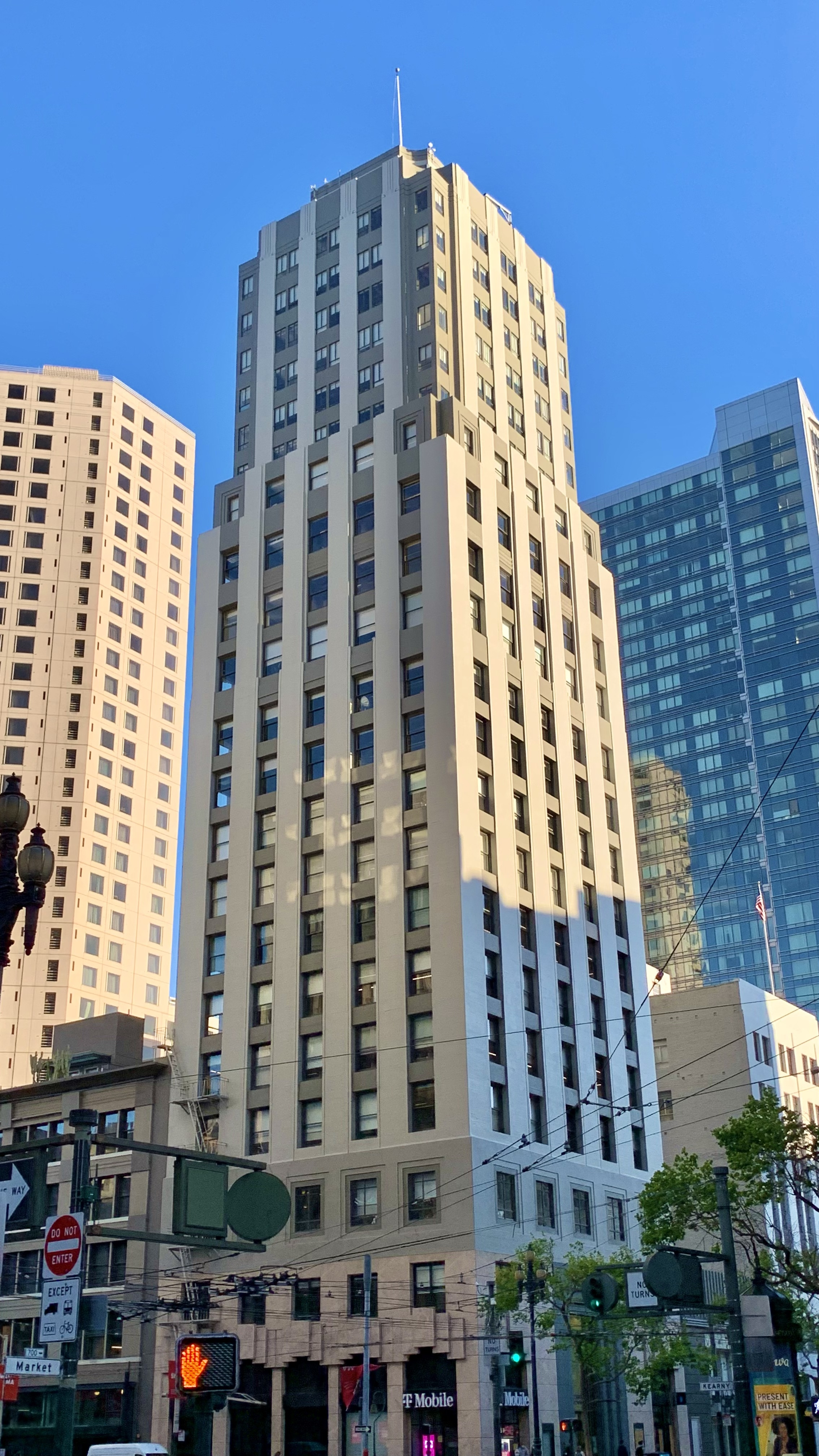
- In 2021
- Interactive map of the Central Tower area
- Former names: Call Building; Spreckels Building

Record height
- Preceded by: Chronicle Building
- Surpassed by: Standard Oil Building

General information
- Type: Commercial offices
- Location: 703 Market Street; San Francisco, California
- Coordinates: 37.787181°N 122.403861°W
- Completed: 1898; 1938 (art deco/art moderne renovations)
- Owner: RKI 703 Investors LLC

Height
- Roof: 91 m (299 ft)

Technical details
- Floor count: 21

Design and construction
- Architects: Reid & Reid; Albert Roller (renovations)

Central Tower is a 91 m (299 ft) 21-story office building at Market and Third Streets in San Francisco, California. It was originally built in the Beaux-Arts style as the Call Building, but has undergone numerous renovations since its completion in 1898 including a substantial remodel in 1937 in the Art Moderne style.

== History ==
In 1890, M. H. de Young, owner of the San Francisco Chronicle, built San Francisco's first skyscraper, the 218-foot (66 m) Chronicle Building, to house his newspaper. In competitive response, John D. Spreckels and his father Claus Spreckels purchased the San Francisco Call in 1895 and commissioned a tower of their own on Market and Third Street, on San Francisco's Newspaper Row, that would dwarf the Chronicle Building.

Claus Spreckles mostly built Call Tower with local labor. Concerned with seismic safety, he commissioned Chicago architect Charles Louis Strobel, who reinforced the building's steel frame. The design was by H.J. Brunnier Associates, and the main contractor was Dinwiddie Construction.

In September 1895, The Call wrote:

[The Call Building] is to be built on the corner of Market and Third streets, of granite and white marble, and will be fifteen stories — 310 feet high, the highest building this side of Chicago. Unlike the Chronicle building it will be a beautiful building and a credit to its owner, Claus Spreckels, and worthy of the great paper to be printed within its walls. A light granite will be used for the first three stories, but above the third story white marble will be used. The main entrance or rotunda will be finished in some polished California marble, the very choicest obtainable, and the floor will be mosaic.

Construction concluded in 1897. The building eventually stood 315 feet (96 m) tall, making it the tallest building west of Chicago. It had an ornate baroque dome that housed the offices of Reid & Reid, the building's architects, and four corner cupolas, as well as an ornate triumphal arch for its entrance. By the end of 1897, Claus Spreckels had spent over one million dollars on the construction of his new building. A personal touch of his was an engraved "CS" on much of the building, such as the lobby, doors, and doorknobs. A red light on the 19th floor known as the Call Lantern signaled that an extra edition was coming.

The building was connected with a tunnel to a second building on Stevenson Street that held heat boilers, electric engines, and pumps, as well as additional offices, known as the Power House.

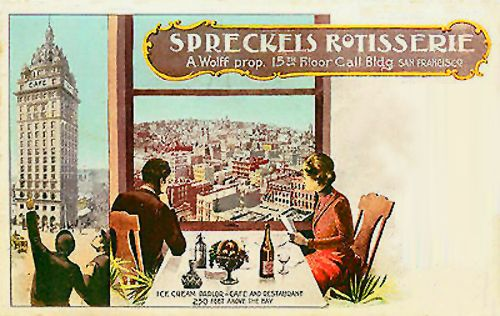
Spreckels Rotisserie in the Call Building was a popular tourist attraction.

Its opening with a light show drew attention from across the San Francisco Bay including the East Bay because it was so bright. It could be seen from San Jose. It quickly became a popular tourist attraction.

The structure was badly burned and damaged by the 1906 San Francisco earthquake, although it did not collapse due to its steel frame, thick brick walls, and quality design. However, its heavily wooden and ornate interior were essentially destroyed, though some artifacts remained. After the earthquake, the building was renamed the Claus Spreckles Building. The collapse of the adjoining Power House during the earthquake may have sparked the fire which burned it. Six months following the Earthquake, the Call was publishing again from the building as restoration continued. Its restoration was seen as a symbol of the reconstruction of San Francisco. In 1914, the newspaper moved into new offices, and new owners allowed it to decline somewhat.

The building's basement was probably used as a speakeasy during the Prohibition Era. In 1937, architect Albert Roller refurbished the structure in a Moderne Art Deco style, to fit with contemporary 20th century standards. The building's height was reduced to 298 feet (91 m), the number of stories was increased from 15 to 21, and the ornate dome and the cupolas atop the building were removed.

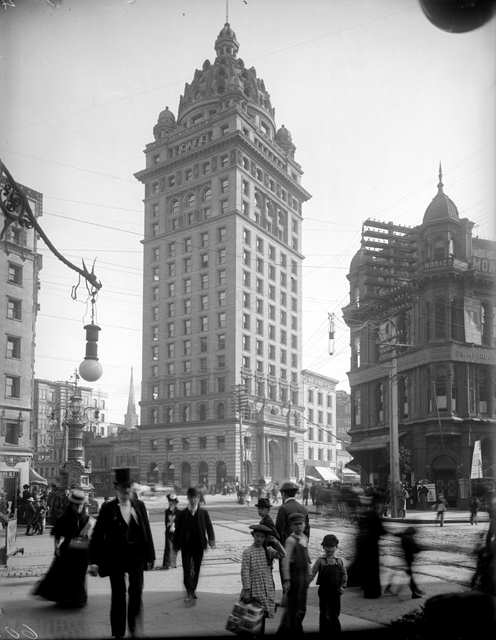
The Call Building before the devastating 1906 earthquake.

There were various significant architectural and infrastructural changes to the building in the 21st century, including an exterior paint job with dark stripes of brown to emphasize the building's verticality. The building was put up for sale in August 2013 at nearly 50 million dollars, and sold in December of that same year. Following this, an extensive capital improvement and renovation project has begun to revive the building and ensure that it meets the needs of today's office tenants.

== Reception ==
The reception to the construction of the then-Call Tower was widely positive. In September 1895, The Call wrote that "The San Francisco Call is to have the finest building ever erected for a newspaper office'. An unknown admirer wrote: "It is, per se, a beautiful building—that is the unanimous verdict. After that it is imposing, magnificent, costly, a pride to San Francisco, a monument to the good taste and enterprise of its owner and builder, Claus Spreckels; the greatest newspaper building in the world, the handsomest of tall buildings, the tallest of the tall buildings west of Chicago—all these things and more; but first, last and all the time, it is the most beautiful building." Public reaction was overwhelmingly positive. Some of the excitement was based on the idea that the Call Building could be San Francisco's first and only true skyscraper, given the low skylines at the time.

The building inspired the 1906 Humboldt Bank Building and its form.

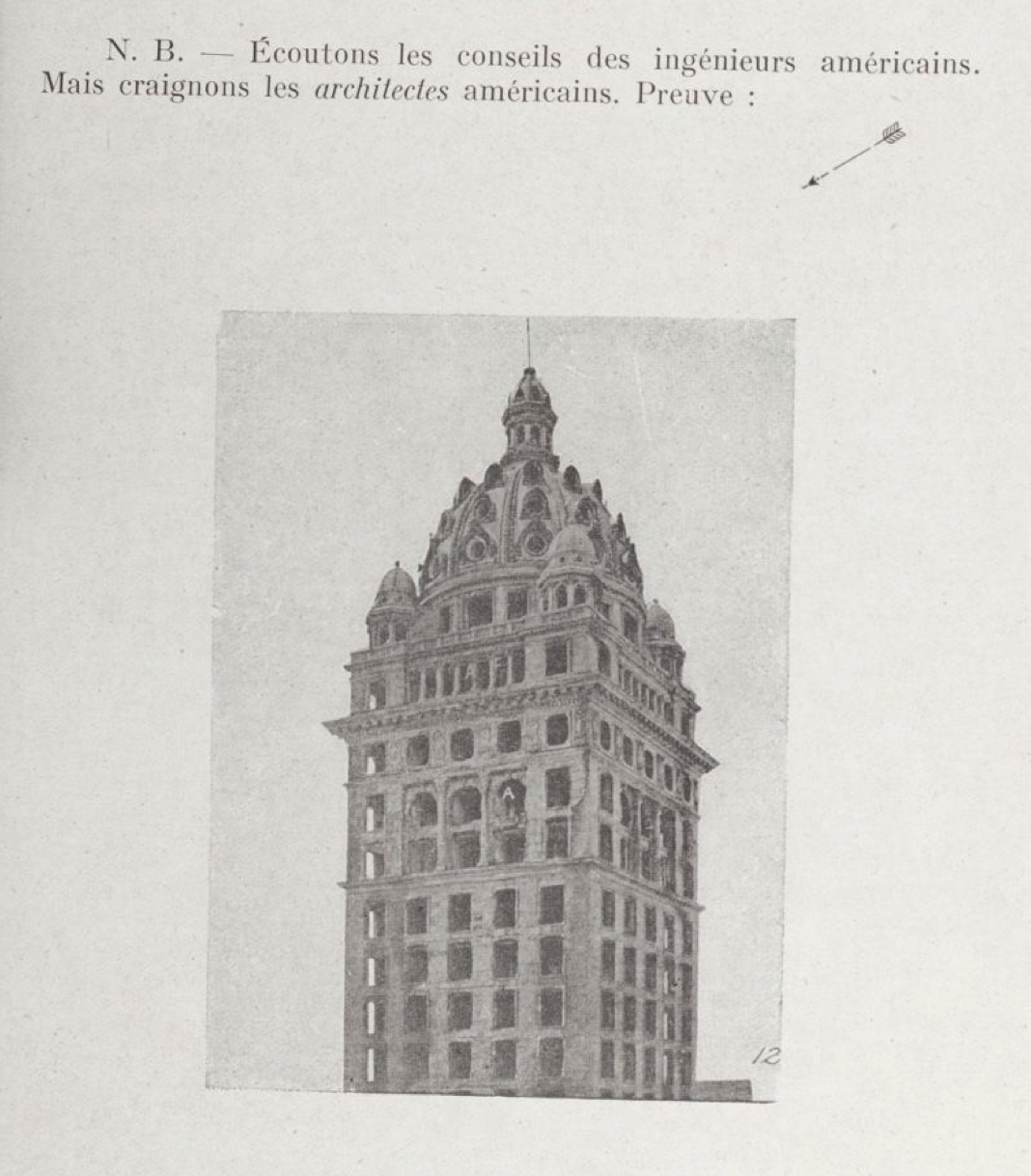
Le Corbusier's critique of the Call Tower.

However, some modernist architects developed other attitudes towards it, such as Le Corbusier, who viewed its ornate neo-Baroque spire as backward. He wrote, above a photo of the Call Tower, in his 1923 book Vers un architecture the caption: "Écoutons les conseils des ingenieurs américains. Mais craignons les architectes americains, Preuve:" (translation: "Let us listen to the advice of American engineers. But let us beware of American architects. Proof:"). His use of the building bombed out after the 1906 fire, with dirt covering its facade, probably served to demonstrate his point at this style of architecture being outdated, albeit in a rather deceptive way.

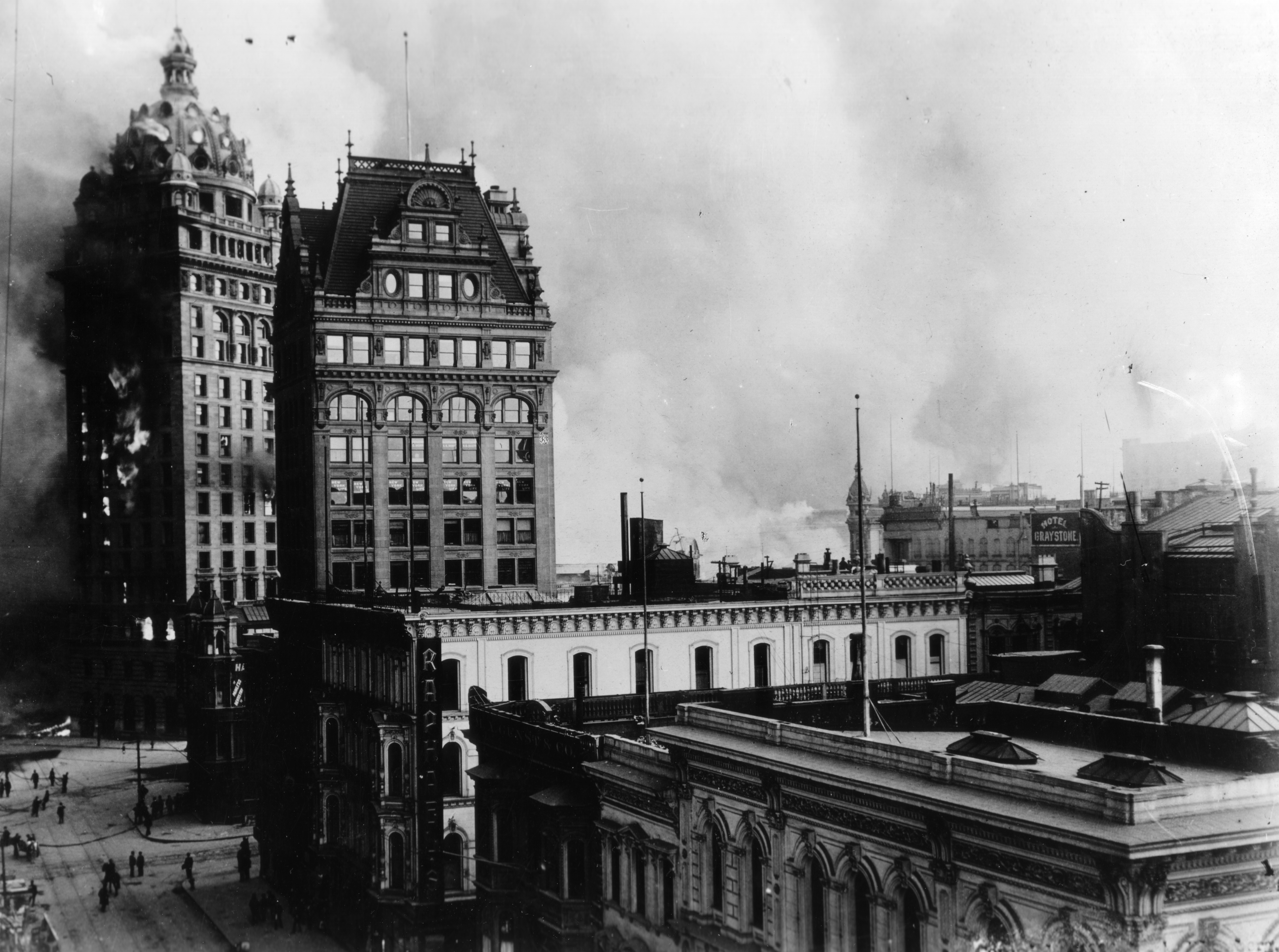
On fire after the 1906 earthquake

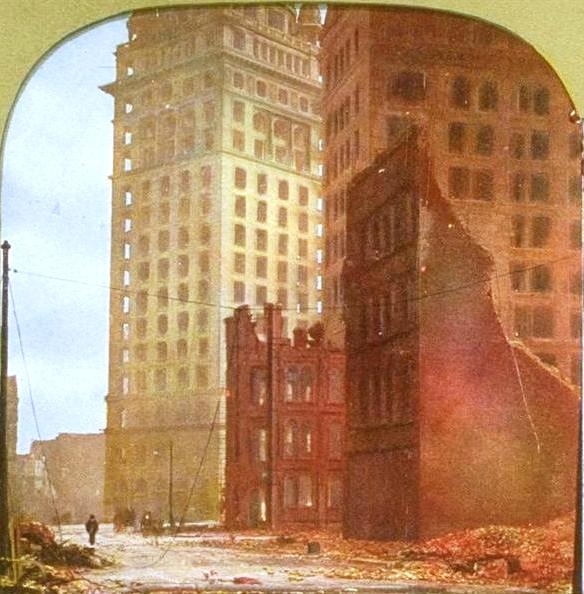
Aftermath of the fire

== See also ==
- List of early skyscrapers
- List of San Francisco Designated Landmarks
- List of tallest buildings in San Francisco
