= George W. Kelham =

American architect

George William Kelham
- Born: 1871; Manchester, Massachusetts, U.S.
- Died: 1936 (aged 64–65)
- Education: Harvard University
- Alma mater: École des Beaux-Arts
- Occupation: Architect
- Years active: 1906–1936

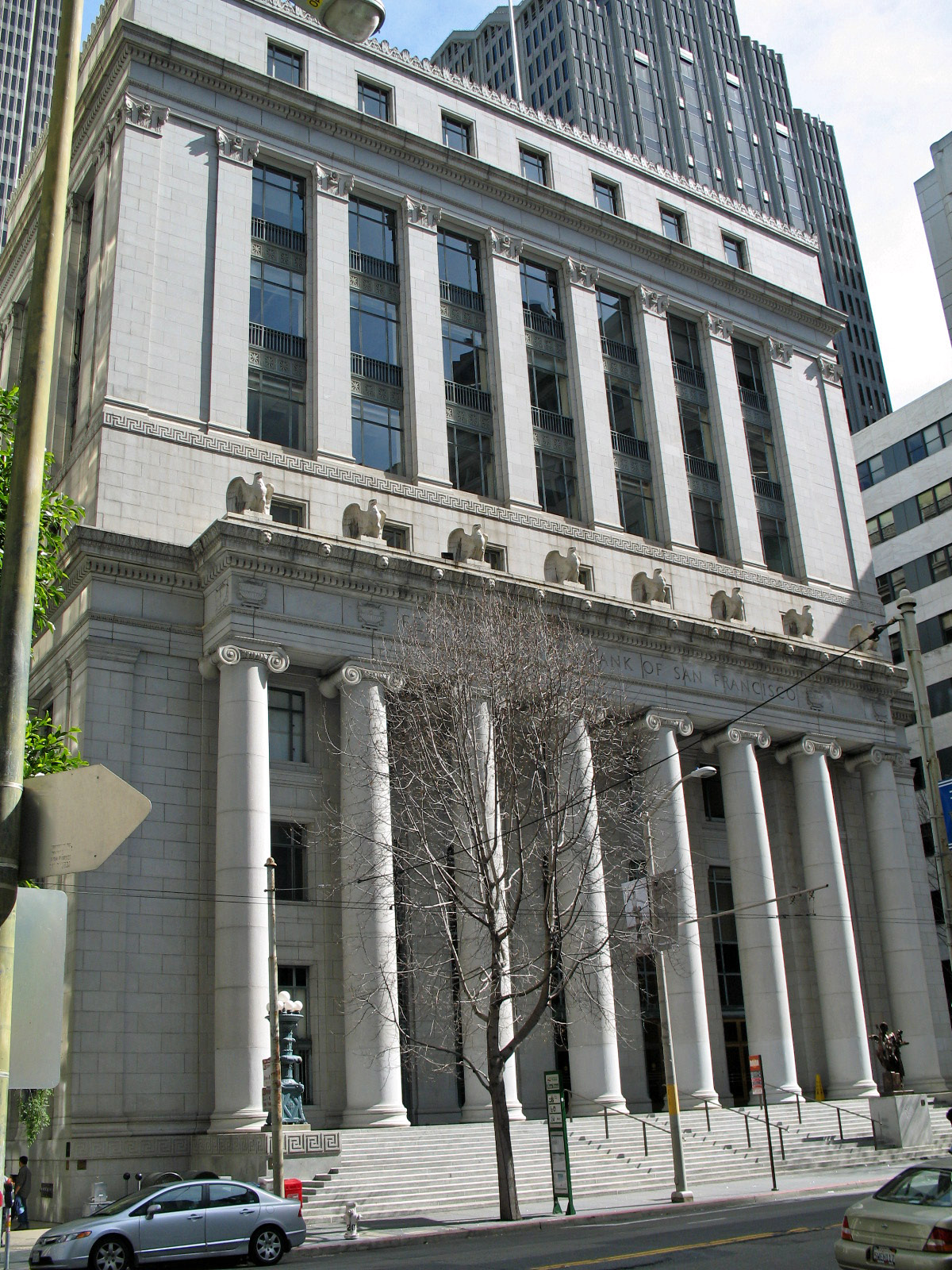
Federal Reserve Bank, San Francisco, 1924

George William Kelham (1871–1936) was an American architect, he was most active in the San Francisco Bay Area.

== Biography ==
Born in Manchester, Massachusetts, Kelham was educated at Harvard University and graduated from the Ecole des Beaux-Arts in 1896. As an employee of New York architects Trowbridge & Livingston, he was sent by the firm to San Francisco for the Palace Hotel in 1906 and remained there after the building completion in 1909.

Kelham was responsible for the master plan for the Panama–Pacific International Exposition in San Francisco, did significant work on Treasure Island for the Golden Gate International Exposition in 1938, and designed at least five major buildings in the city, along with significant work in Salt Lake City and Los Angeles. He was also supervising architect for the campus of the University of California, Berkeley from 1927 to 1931.

== Work ==
=== California ===
==== San Francisco ====
- Sharon Building (1912)
- Ganter & Mattern Company Building (1912)
- Panama-Pacific International Exposition (1915), supervising architect
- The old San Francisco Public Library (1917), now the Asian Art Museum of San Francisco
- Standard Oil Building (1922)
- Federal Reserve Bank Building (1924), NRHP-listed
- Delia Fleishhacker Memorial Building (1925), NRHP-listed
- Russ Building (1927)
- Shell Building (1929)
- Administration Building, Treasure Island (1938), NRHP-listed
- Hall of Transportation, Treasure Island (1938), NRHP-listed
- Court of the Moon (1938), Golden Gate International Exposition

==== Elsewhere ====
- Griffith-McKenzie Building, now Helm Building (1914), Fresno
- Farmers' and Merchants' Bank (1917), Stockton
- Roble Hall (1917), dormitory for women at Stanford University
- Bay Terrace Subdivision (1918), 126 individual buildings as housing for Mare Island Naval Shipyard workers, Vallejo
- Standard Oil Building (1926), Los Angeles
- University of California, Los Angeles supervising architect (1927), including the designs for:
  - Powell Library
  - Haines Hall
  - Kerckoff Hall
  - Moore Hall
  - Men's Gym
- University of California, Berkeley supervising architect for:
  - Bowles Hall (1928), NRHP-listed
  - Valley Life Sciences Building (1930)
  - International House (1930)
  - Moses Hall (1931)
  - McLaughlin Hall (1931)
  - Davis Hall (1931)
  - Edwards Stadium (1932)
  - Harmon Men's Gym (1933)
