= Recommind =

American software company

Recommind Inc.
- Type: Incorporated
- Industry: Information technology Information access Software; Legal technology
- Founded: San Francisco, California (2000)
- Headquarters: San Francisco, United States
- Area served: Americas; Europe; Asia; Australia
- Products: Decisiv Search; Decisiv Email; Decisiv Categorization; Axcelerate eDiscovery; Perceptiv Contract Analysis
- Website: recommind.opentext.com

Recommind (OpenText Recommind) is a subsidiary of OpenText Corporation that builds and sells software for electronic discovery, information governance, enterprise search and content categorization.

== History ==
Recommind was founded in 2000 by Jan Puzicha, Thomas Hofmann and Derek Schueren. Probabilistic latent semantic analysis (PLSA), a technique used for data analysis, is the underlying methodology for Recommind's software technology. Puzicha and Hofmann introduced and then patented PLSA in 1999, based on research they undertook at University of California, Berkeley.

In 2013, the company was selected as among the world's top 10 most innovative companies in big data by Fast Company. In the same year, it secured an e-discovery review contract with the Securities and Exchange Commission.

In 2016, Recommind was acquired by OpenText for approximately $163 million
