= Third Street (San Francisco) =

Street in San Francisco, California, United States

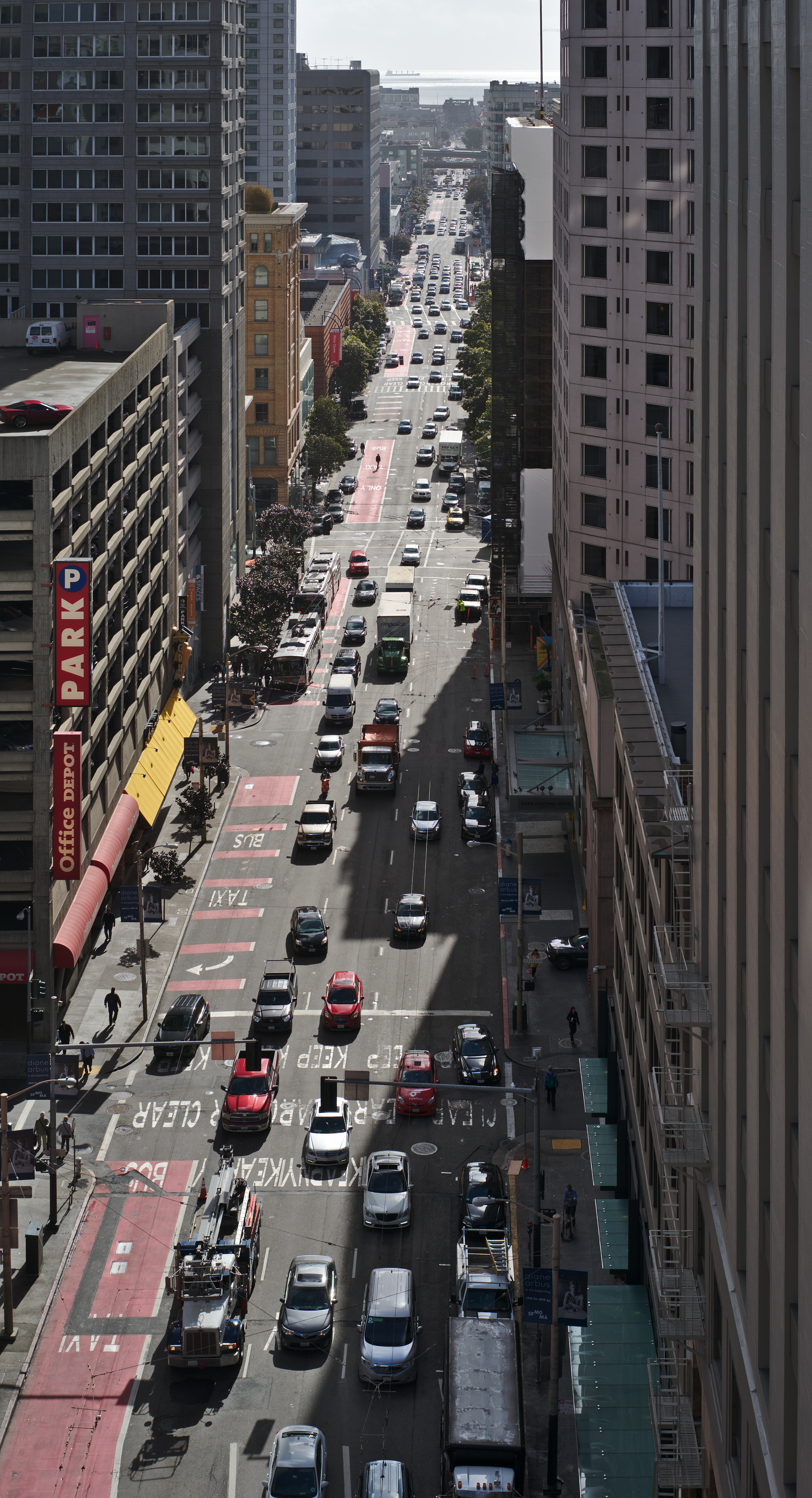
- Third Street seen from its Northern End at Market Street, with the San Francisco Bay in the far background
- Location: San Francisco, California
- South end: US 101 (Bayshore Boulevard) near Little Hollywood
- North end: Market Street in Union Square

Third Street is a north–south street in San Francisco, California, running through the Downtown, Mission Bay, Potrero Point, Dogpatch, and Bayview-Hunters Point neighborhoods. The road turns into Kearny Street north of Market Street and connects into Bayshore Boulevard south of Meade Avenue. It was formerly called Kentucky Street in the Dogpatch and Railroad Avenue in the Bayview.

== Background ==
Major League Baseball's San Francisco Giants play at Oracle Park on the intersection of Third and King.

The majority of the street is served by the T Third Street light rail line. It was the first new light rail line in San Francisco in more than half a century, and the first fully accessible line in the system. It is also the first true light rail line in the mostly streetcar Muni Metro system, as it operates primarily in the median.

In 2009, San Francisco Mayor Gavin Newsom proposed Third Street be renamed for former mayor Willie Brown. The proposal was not adopted.

In the 1960s, the downtown section of Third Street was known as San Francisco's "skid row", with most of its (then much smaller) homeless population concentrating there.

The street featured as a filming location in the James Bond film A View to a Kill, when Bond escapes from police in a fire engine by jumping over the rising Lefty O'Doul Drawbridge.
