= Joseph Hoffman =

American screenwriter

- Born: February 20, 1909; New York, New York, USA
- Died: May 25, 1997 (aged 88); Los Angeles, California, USA
- Occupation: Screenwriter
- Years active: 1935–1972

Joseph Hoffman (1909–1997) was an American screenwriter.

== Biography ==
Hoffman began his career with a bang as a screenwriter in the mid-1930s and was installed as a junior screenwriter at 20th Century Fox. He is credited with writing the story, dialogue, or screenplay for 57 movies, from Your Uncle Dudley to The King's Pirate. From the mid-1950s into the 1960s, Hoffman wrote for television, including Leave It to Beaver, My Three Sons, The Smothers Brothers, Bonanza, and The Patty Duke Show. From 1954 on, he also worked as a producer at Screen Gems.

== Filmography ==
=== Films ===
Year	Film	Credit	Notes
1935	Your Uncle Dudley	Screenplay By	Co-Wrote Screenplay with "Allen Birkin" and "Dore Schary"
1936	Charlie Chan's Secret	Screenplay By	Co-Wrote Screenplay with "Robert Ellis" and "Helen Logan"
1936	Jailbreak	Screenplay By	Co-Wrote Screenplay with "Robert Hardy Andrews"
1936	Country Gentlemen	Screenplay By	Co-Wrote Screenplay with "Gertrude Orr"
1936	Thank You, Jeeves!	Written By	Co-Wrote Screenplay with "Stephen Gross"
1937	Damaged Goods	Screenplay By	
1937	She's Got Everything	Story By	Co-Wrote Story with "Maxwell Shane"
1937	Under Suspicion	Written By	Co-Wrote Screenplay with "Jefferson Parker" and "Philip Wylie"
1937	Hollywood Round-Up	Story By, Screenplay By	Co-Wrote Screenplay with "Monroe Shaff" and "Ethel La Blanche"
1937	Headin' East	Screenplay By	Co-Wrote Screenplay with "Paul Franklin" and "Ethel La Blanche"
1938	Arson Gang Busters	Screenplay By	Co-Wrote Screenplay with "Norman Burnstine" and "Alex Gottlieb"
1938	Safety in Numbers	Screenplay By	Co-Wrote Screenplay with "Karen DeWolf" and "Robert Chapin"
1938	Shadows Over Shanghai	Screenplay By	
1939	The Jones Family in Hollywood	Story By	Co-Wrote Story with "Buster Keaton"
1939	Pride of the Navy	Story By	Co-Wrote Story with "James Webb"
1939	Boy Friend	Screenplay By	Co-Wrote Screenplay with "Barry Trivers"
1939	Quick Millions	Story By, Screenplay By	Co-Wrote Screenplay with "Buster Keaton" and "Stanley Rauh"
1940	Young as You Feel	Screenplay By	Co-Wrote Screenplay with "Stanley Rauh"
1940	Shooting High	Screenplay By	Uncredited Writer
1941	The Return of Daniel Boone	Screenplay By	Co-Wrote Screenplay with "Paul Franklin"
1941	The Officer and the Lady	Screenplay By	Co-Wrote Screenplay with "Lambert Hillyer"
1942	One Thrilling Night	Written By	
1942	The Man with Two Lives	Written By	
1942	City of Silent Men	Story By, Screenplay By	Co-Wrote Story with "Robert E. Kent"
1942	The Living Ghost	Screenplay By	
1943	High Explosive	Story By	
1943	Redhead from Manhattan	Screenplay By	
1943	My Kingdom for a Cook	Screenplay By	Co-Wrote Screenplay with "Harold Goldman", "Jack Henley", and "Andrew Solt"
1943	Swing Fever	Story By	Co-Wrote Story with "Matt Brooks"
1943	Gung Ho!: The Story of Carlson's Makin Island Raiders	Screenplay By	Co-Wrote Screenplay with "Lucien Hubbard"
1944	Carolina Blues	Screenplay By	Co-Wrote Screenplay with "Al Martin" and "Jack Henley"
1944	Goodnight Sweetheart	Story By	Co-Wrote Story with "Frank Fenton"
1944	Girl in the Case	Screenplay By	Co-Wrote Screenplay with "Dorcas Cochran"
1944	Gypsy Wildcat	Screenplay By (Uncredited)	Additional Dialogue
1945	China Sky	Screenplay By	Co-Wrote Screenplay with "Brenda Weisberg"
1946	One Way to Love	Screenplay By	
1947	That's My Gal	Screenplay By	
1947	Sikken en nat	Screenplay By	
1948	An Innocent Affair	Written By	Co-Wrote Screenplay with "Lou Breslow"
1949	And Baby Makes Three	Written By	Co-Wrote Screenplay with "Lou Breslow"
1950	Buccaneer's Girl	Screenplay By	Co-Wrote Screenplay with "Harold Shumate"
1951	Air Cadet	Screenplay By	
1951	Week-End with Father	Screenplay By	
1952	At Sword's Point	Screenplay By	Co-Wrote Screenplay with "Walter Ferris"
1952	No Room for the Groom	Screenplay By	Based on the novel "My True Love" By "Darwin Teilhet"
1952	Has Anybody Seen My Gal	Screenplay By	
1952	The Duel at Silver Creek	Screenplay By	Co-Wrote Screenplay with "Gerald Drayson Adams"
1952	Against All Flags	Written By	Co-Wrote Screenplay with "Aeneas MacKenzie"
1953	The Lone Hand	Screenplay By	
1954	Rails Into Laramie	Screenplay By	Co-Wrote screenplay with "D.D. Beauchamp"
1954	Yankee Pasha	Screenplay By	Based on the novel of the same name by "Edison Marshall"
1955	Chicago Syndicate	Screenplay By	
1955	Tall Man Riding	Screenplay By	Based on the novel of the same name by "Norman A. Fox"
1959	Pier 5, Havana	Written By	Co-Wrote Screenplay with "Robert E. Kent"
1964	Sex and the Single Girl	Story By	Based on the novel of the same name By "Helen Gurley Brown"
1967	The King's Pirate	Written By	Co-Wrote screenplay with "Paul Wayne" and "Aeneas MacKenzie"

=== Television ===
Year	TV Series	Credit	Notes
1955	General Electric Theater	Writer	1 Episode
1955	Damon Runyon Theater	Writer	1 Episode
1955-57	The Ford Television Theater	Producer	24 episodes
1956	Celebrity Playhouse	Producer	1 Episode
1956	Lux Video Theatre	Writer	1 Episode
1957-58	Colt .45	Writer, producer	7 episodes
1960	Michael Shayne	Producer	9 episodes
1961	Whispering Smith	Writer, producer	8 episodes
1961-62	Leave It to Beaver	Writer	6 episodes
1962	Bonanza	Writer	1 Episode
1962	Ichabod and Me	Writer	1 Episode
1962-67	My Three Sons	Writer	11 episodes
1964	The Great Adventure	Writer	1 Episode
1964	36th Academy Awards	Writer	
1964-68	The Virginian	Writer	4 episodes
1965	Branded	Writer	1 Episode
1965	The Patty Duke Show	Writer	1 Episode
1966-70	Family Affair	Writer	6 episodes
1970	Nanny and the Professor	Writer	1 Episode
1972	Love, American Style	Writer	1 Episode

== Bibliography ==
- Shelley, Peter. Frances Farmer: The Life and Films of a Troubled Star. McFarland, 2010.
