= Yankee Pasha =

Yankee Pasha may refer to:

- Yankee Pasha (novel), a historical novel by Edison Marshall published in 1947
- Yankee Pasha (film), a 1954 film by based on the novel
