= Harpoon (1948 film) =

1948 film

- Directed by: Ewing Scott
- Written by: Ewing Scott
- Produced by: Ewing Scott associated George Danches
- Starring: John Bromfield; Alyce Louis; James Cardwell
- Music by: Lucien Cailliet
- Production company: Danches Bros. Productions
- Distributed by: Screen Guild Productions
- Release date: November 1948
- Running time: 83 minutes
- Country: United States
- Budget: $400,000

Harpoon is a 1948 American adventure film directed and produced by Ewing Scott, and starring John Bromfield in his first film role. Although described by some sources as a "documentary," it is a fictional feature film shot on location in Alaska.

== Plot ==
In Alaska in the late 19th century, a feud between two whaler's sons carry on the rivalry after the deaths of their fathers.

== Cast ==
- John Bromfield as Michael Shand
- Alyce Louis as Kitty Canon
- James Cardwell as Red Dorsett Jr.
- Patricia Garrison as Christine McFee
- Jack George as Rev. McFee
- Edgar Hinton as Kurt Shand

== Production ==
The Danches brothers, Abe, Ralph, and George, were Cleveland-based industrialists who made a fortune during World War II selling powdered eggs. After the war, the brothers set up Danches Bros. Productions to make movies and made Untamed Fury in 1946 with Ewing Scott. Scott had made two films in Alaska in the 1920s and had an idea for a new one, which he convinced the Danches brothers to fund. In May 1947 Scott announced he would make the film on a three-month location trip. The Danches brothers purchased a military surplus patrol boat and converted it into a "floating studio" on which the entire production crew embarked from San Diego to Alaska on 20 May 1947 for the shoot. The boat, which had originally been built for $250,000, was purchased for $40,000 and was painted black on one side and white on the other so it could be used to depict two different boats in the movie.

Scott wanted James Davis or Robert Alda for the lead and intended to release through Universal. John Bromfield was eventually cast after being discovered repairing nets on the Santa Monica pier. Although this film marked Bromfield's first credited role, he would make his debut screen appearance in Sorry, Wrong Number which premiered one month before Harpoon was released to theaters.

The production proved problematic, with the original actor playing "Red" having to be replaced after suffering severe injuries on the set and extensive reshoots costing over $30,000 required after it was discovered some of the film was scratched. The production crew returned to California in September 1947. Following some additional studio work, filming was finished by October 1947.

The Danches wanted to make a follow-up, The Vanishing Isle and The Kind of Kapu. Neither appears to have been made. However, Scott did make Arctic Manhunt (1948), shot mostly in Alaska.

== Reception ==
New York Times critic Bosley Crowther gave the film a "minor citation for effort", but dismissed its story as "hopelessly naive" and "childish", and the acting and direction as "painfully amateurish".

The ship used during the production of Harpoon, "The Flying Kate", is referenced in John S. Bohne's 2001 book The Sea Change, which describes the film as "a rough sea adventure made from a rather bad script".
