= The Flying Saucer =

1950 film by Mikel Conrad

- Theatrical release insert poster
- Directed by: Mikel Conrad
- Written by: Howard Irving Young; Mikel Conrad
- Produced by: Mikel Conrad; Morris M. Wein
- Starring: Mikel Conrad; Hans von Teuffen; Denver Pyle
- Cinematography: Phillip Tannura
- Edited by: Robert Crandall
- Music by: Darrell Calker
- Production companies: Colonial Productions, Inc.
- Distributed by: Film Classics
- Release date: January 5, 1950
- Running time: 70 minutes
- Country: United States
- Language: English

The Flying Saucer is a 1950 independently produced American black-and-white science-fiction spy film drama. It was written by Howard Irving Young from an original story by Mikel Conrad, who also produced, directed and stars in the film with Pat Garrison and Hantz von Teuffen. The film was first distributed in the U.S. by Film Classics and later rereleased in 1953 by Realart Pictures as a double feature with Atomic Monster (the retitled reissue of Man Made Monster, originally released in 1941 by Universal Pictures).

The Flying Saucer was the first feature film to deal with the new and popular topic of flying saucers, which were first identified on June 24, 1947 when private pilot Kenneth Arnold reported seeing nine silvery, crescent-shaped objects flying in tight formation. During the 1947 flying-disc craze, more than 800 copycat sightings were reported throughout North America.

The film is not related to the later Ray Harryhausen science-fiction film Earth vs. the Flying Saucers, released by Columbia Pictures.

== Plot ==
American intelligence officials learn that Soviet spies have begun exploring a remote region of the Alaskan Territory in search of answers to the worldwide reports of "flying saucers". Wealthy American playboy Mike Trent, who was raised in that remote region, is recruited by intelligence officer Hank Thorn to assist a Secret Service agent in exploring the area to discover what the Soviets may have found.

To his surprise, Mike discovers that the agent is an attractive woman named Vee Langley, and they slowly become mutually attracted. Their cover story is that Mike is suffering from a nervous breakdown and she is his private nurse. At Mike's family's wilderness lodge, they are met by a foreign-accented caretaker named Hans, who is new to the job. Mike is very skeptical of the flying-saucer reports until he spots one flying over the lodge. Assorted complications ensue until Mike and Vee finally discover that Hans is a Soviet agent trying to acquire the flying saucer. The saucer is an invention of American scientist Dr. Lawton, but Lawton's assistant Turner is a communist sympathizer and tries to sell the saucer to the Soviets for one million dollars.

Mike's trip to Juneau to see old friends, including Matt Mitchell, is ill-advised. When Vee tracks him down, he is in the company of a bar girl named Nanette. Matt tries to strike a bargain with Soviet ring leader Colonel Marikoff but is knocked unconscious. He is able to escape and seeks Mike, but they are attacked by the Soviets, who kill Matt. Before he dies, Matt reveals the location of the saucer to be Twin Lakes. Mike rents an aircraft and flies to where the saucer is hidden at an isolated cabin. After flying back to his lodge, he tries to find Vee, who has tried to spirit Lawton away. The trio are captured by the turncoat Taylor and a group of Soviet agents. The Soviets lead their prisoners through a secret tunnel hidden under the glacier, but an avalanche kills them. Mike, Vee and Lawton escape the tunnel just in time to see Turner fly away in the saucer. It suddenly explodes in mid-air because Lawton had placed a time bomb on aboard for such an eventuality. Their mission now accomplished, Mike and Vee embrace and kiss.

== Cast ==
- Mikel Conrad as Mike Trent
- Pat Garrison as Vee Langley
- Hantz von Teuffen as Hans
- Roy Engel as Dr. Lawton
- Lester Sharpe as Col. Marikoff
- Denver Pyle as Turner
- Earl Lyon as Alex, a spy
- Frank Darrien as Matt Mitchell
- Russell Hicks as Intelligence Chief Hank Thorn
- Virginia Hewitt as Nanette
- Garry Owen as Bartender
- Phillip Morris
- George Baxter
- Robert Boon

== Production ==
Principal photography for The Flying Saucer took place from late September to early October 1949 at Hal Roach Studios. Additional B-roll photography was shot in Alaska on location where Mikel Conrad claimed to have obtained footage of actual flying saucers while shooting Arctic Manhunt in the winter of 1947.

The opening prologue appears before the onscreen credits and states: "We gratefully acknowledge the cooperation of those in authority who made the release of the 'Flying Saucer' film possible at this time." Although the message obliquely alludes to authorized government films of flying saucers, no such footage is included in The Flying Saucer.

== Reception ==
In a contemporary review for The New York Times, critic Bosley Crowther wrote: "'The Flying Saucer' ... can go right on flying, for all we care. In fact, it is such a clumsy item that we doubt if it will go very far, and we hesitate, out of mercy, to fire even a critical shot at it."

== See also ==
- 1950 in film
- List of science fiction films of the 1950s
