= Headin' East =

1937 film by Ewing Scott

- Directed by: Ewing Scott
- Screenplay by: Paul Franklin; Joseph Hoffman; Ethel La Blanche
- Produced by: L.G. Leonard
- Starring: Buck Jones
- Cinematography: Allen Q. Thompson
- Edited by: Robert O. Crandall
- Production company: Coronet Pictures
- Distributed by: Columbia Pictures
- Release date: December 13, 1937
- Running time: 67 minutes
- Country: United States
- Language: English

Headin' East is a 1937 American Western film directed by Ewing Scott.

== Plot ==
Cowboy Buck Benson trades his trusty six-shooter for bare knuckles and batters his way from the wide-open plains to crack down on mob-related crime in Manhattan.

== Cast ==
- Buck Jones as Buck Benson
- Ruth Coleman as Helen Calhoun
- Shemp Howard as Windy Wylie
- Donald Douglas as Eric Ward
- Elaine Arden as Penny
- Frank Faylen as Joe
- Leo Gorcey as Boy Boxer in Gym (Uncredited)

== Production ==
The working title of the film was West of Broadway.
