= McAllister Tower Apartments =

Apartment skyscraper in California

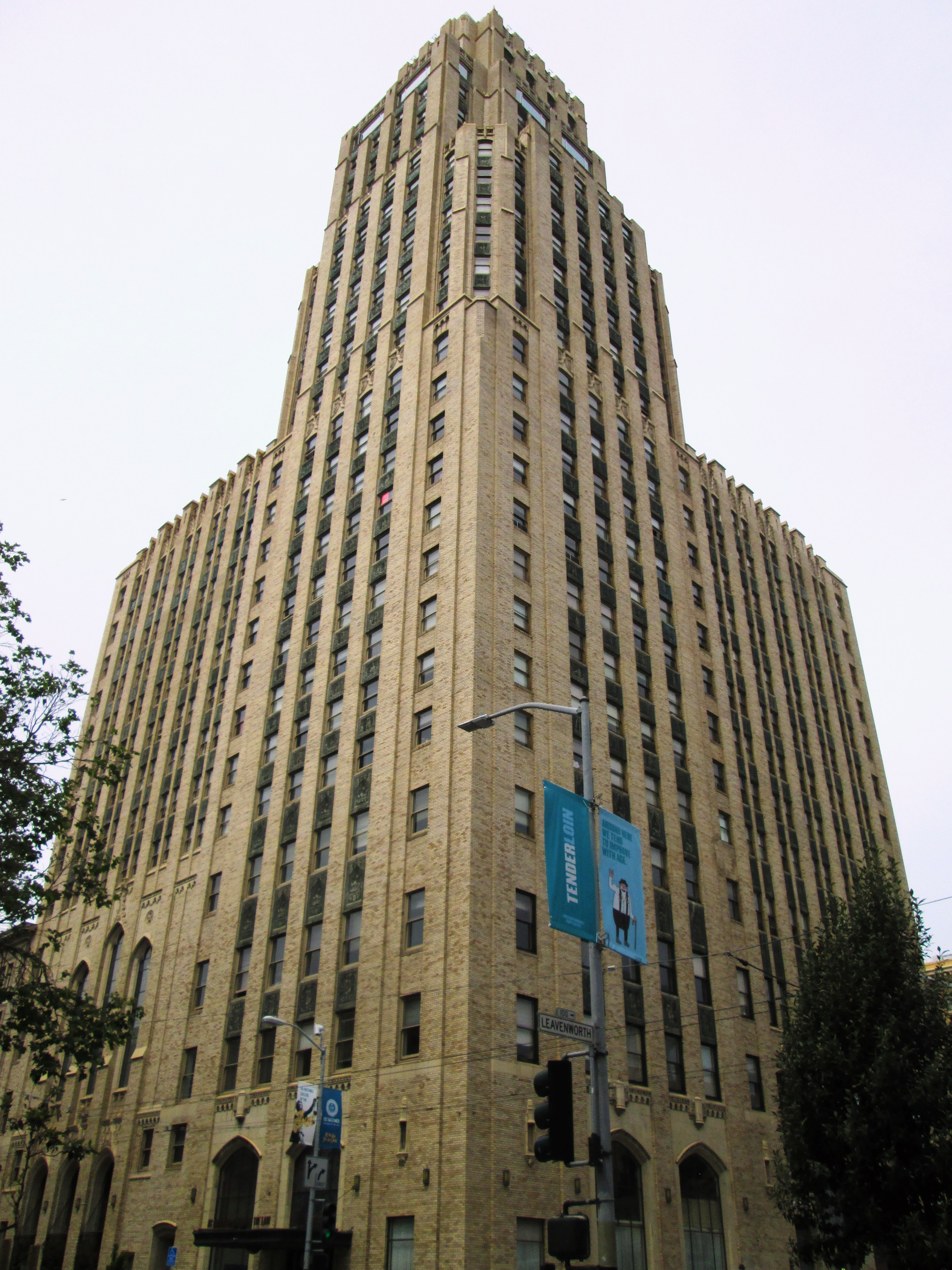
- The building in 2017

- Location within San Francisco
- Former names: 100 McAllister; Temple Methodist Episcopal Church; William Taylor Hotel; Empire Hotel

General information
- Type: Offices; Residential
- Architectural style: Gothic Revival; Art Deco/Art Moderne
- Location: 100 McAllister Street; San Francisco, California
- Coordinates: 37.7810°N 122.4139°W
- Completed: January 1930
- Owner: UC College of the Law, San Francisco
- Operator: UC College of the Law, San Francisco

Height
- Roof: 94 m (308 ft)

Technical details
- Floor count: 28
- Floor area: 280,000 sq ft (26,000 m^{2})

Design and construction
- Architects: Miller & Pflueger; Lewis P. Hobart

McAllister Tower Apartments, also known as the William Taylor Hotel, is a 28-story, 94 m (308 ft) residential apartment skyscraper at 100 McAllister Street in San Francisco, California. The property is owned and operated by UC Law SF. The tower includes mixed-use offices on various floors, student residences and the Art Deco-styled "Sky Room" with a panoramic view on the 24th floor.

The hotel was named in honor of William Taylor, a Methodist missionary who served in San Francisco during the California gold rush. Conceived as an unusual combination of a large church surmounted by a hotel, construction of the building brought architectural dispute. Initially designed by Timothy L. Pflueger in the Gothic Revival style, the investors fired his firm and hired Lewis P. Hobart, who changed little of Pflueger's design. In a resulting lawsuit, Pflueger won nearly half the damages he asked for. The building opened in 1930 as the William Taylor Hotel and Temple Methodist Episcopal Church. However, extra construction expenses had put the congregation at greater financial risk, and the church-hotel concept did not prove popular. No profit was made in six years, and the church left, losing their investment. In the late 1930s the building housed the Empire Hotel, known for its Sky Room lounge, then from World War II to the 1970s, 100 McAllister served as U.S. government offices.

Reopening as university housing and offices in 1981, McAllister Tower is home to some 300 law students and their families. "The Tower" is sited one block from the administrative and scholastic center of UC Law SF (formerly UC Hastings College of the Law) and is the most prominent building in the district. It is a contributing property to the National Register of Historic Places's Uptown Tenderloin Historic District since 2009.

== History ==
=== Church and hotel ===
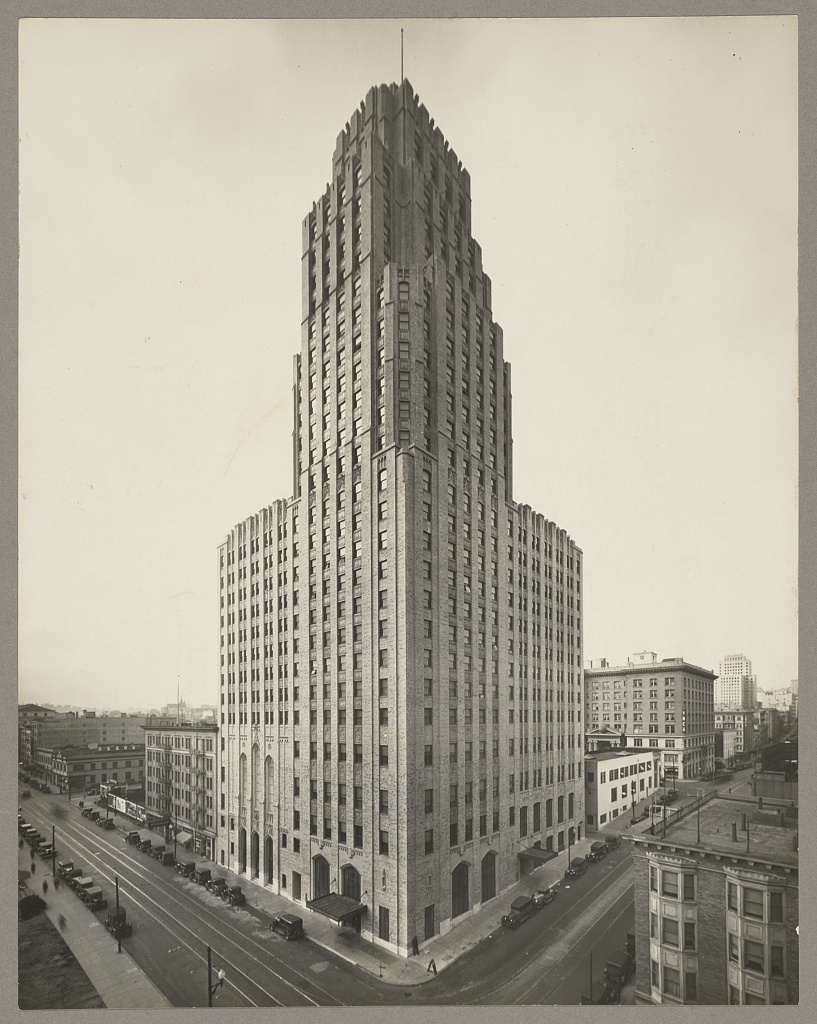
William Taylor Hotel in the 1930s

The skyscraper at 100 McAllister began in 1920 with a plan formulated by Reverend Walter John Sherman to merge four of the largest Methodist Episcopal congregations in San Francisco, sell their various churches and properties and combine their assets to build a "superchurch" with a hotel on top of it. From their initial $800,000 they bought property at McAllister and Leavenworth streets and hired the architectural firm of Miller and Pflueger to design the edifice. Timothy L. Pflueger was chosen as the designer. The new hotel, intended to be "dry" (serving no alcoholic beverages) in the "sinful" city, was to be named after William Taylor, a Methodist Episcopal street preacher and missionary who formed the first Methodist church in San Francisco. The large church was named Temple Methodist Episcopal Church, or simply "Temple Methodist".

Beginning in 1925, Pflueger designed a 308 ft (94 m), 28-story, step-back skyscraper made of brick framed with steel, along the lines of his just-completed Pacific Telephone & Telegraph Company Building. Its main decorative theme was neo-Gothic, expressed strongly in the three Gothic arches which formed the main street-level entrance for the church. The Great Hall, the large worship area located within the second, third and fourth floors was to seat 1,500 churchgoers and a smaller chapel was designed for 125 more. A grand pipe organ from Skinner Organ Company was installed with four manuals controlling 3,881 pipes. A stained glass window was placed 80 feet above the sanctuary, representing Faith, Love and Hope in three tall, narrow panels. Two assembly halls could be combined to hold 1,100 attendees for theatrical or athletic events. Some 500 guest rooms and 32 tower apartments were intended to bring a steady flow of visitors and a source of profit to the church. Though never the tallest building in San Francisco, it was to be the tallest hotel on the Pacific Coast for many decades.

In a dispute, the architectural firm of Miller and Pflueger was fired from the project, and was replaced by Lewis P. Hobart. Miller and Pflueger sued for $81,600, alleging that Hobart's design was little changed from Pflueger's original. Three months after the hotel and church opened in January 1930, Miller and Pflueger won $38,000 in a favorable court decision.

Dedication of the church's pipe organ took place August 31, 1930. It was E. M. Skinner's opus 819 of Boston, Massachusetts. The combined congregation was very satisfied with their new place of worship.

Eventually costing US$2.8 million ($54 million in current value), the building's completion required several rounds of new financing from its investors in order to overcome unanticipated expenses. Unfortunately for the congregation, the idea of a hotel above a church didn't attract the requisite number of guests and the venture failed to turn a profit.

=== Empire Hotel ===
By November 1936, enough debt had accumulated that a bondholder's protective committee foreclosed on the property, buying it back for $750,000. The Temple Methodist congregation lost its investment and was asked to leave. The Skinner Opus pipe organ was removed to be sold to Occidental College in Los Angeles and rebuilt in their Thorne Hall. The three-piece stained glass window was removed and exhibited, eventually making its way to Stockton, California where it was installed in the Morris Chapel at the University of the Pacific. The 100 McAllister building itself was refurbished: the church's floor area was given over to parking, a coffee shop was built in part of the first floor lobby and the new enterprise opened again as the Empire Hotel, noted for completing, in 1938, the first view lounge in the area, the Sky Room on the 24th floor. With plush carpeting, a large Art Deco-style oval bar, and plate glass windows on all sides, the Sky Room provided a panoramic view of the city. Architect & Engineer wrote of the luxurious bar in April, 1938, that it "has no prototype west of New York", referring to Manhattan's Rainbow Room which opened three-and-a-half years earlier.

=== Federal offices ===
At the beginning of direct American involvement in World War II, the U.S. government bought the building and converted it to federal offices, officer billets, spaces used by the Army's Ordnance Procurement department, a passport agency and an induction center run by the local draft board. The high vaulted ceiling of the Great Hall worship center was hidden by a dropped ceiling. After the war, the Internal Revenue Service moved offices into the building.

Many federal groups at 100 McAllister moved their offices in 1959–1960 to the newly built federal building at 450 Golden Gate Avenue, later named the Phillip Burton Federal Building. Occupancy at 100 McAllister was low, though the United States Army Corps of Engineers moved their San Francisco District offices there in the 1960s, and local draftees were still required to appear there through the late 1960s. The San Francisco Selective Service System offices were located in the lower floors of the building during the Vietnam War.

=== UC Hastings ===
In 1978, the University of California, Hastings College of the Law (now "UC Law SF") bought the building, the most prominent in the Tenderloin district, and began two years of refurbishment and redesign. Calling it "McAllister Tower", 248 units were modernized for residential use by law students, and the building opened in 1981 with a combination of compact studio units as well as larger one- and two-bedroom apartments taking up a total of 17 floors. The building, home to about 300 law students and their families, is casually referred to as "the Tower" by Hastings residents and faculty, who have but a one-block commute to the law school's main building at 198 McAllister.

From 1990 through 2001, the Great Hall housed the theater of George Coates Performance Works – an experimental multi-media theater troupe that used the 60 foot high vaulted ceiling for projections.

The old Sky Room with its spectacular 360-degree view reopened in 1999 as the James Edgar Hervey Skyroom, in honor of alumnus James Edgar Hervey, Class of 1950, a prominent San Diego trial lawyer. It is used as a space for student study by day (no alcohol allowed) and is available for special events in the evenings. Other floors of the building hold offices, apartments and residential conveniences. The mezzanine level contains a compact fitness center, the third and fourth floors contain classrooms and offices for political action groups and legal assistance organizations, and the 22nd and 23rd floors hold publishing headquarters for a number of scholarly journals.

The Great Hall remains un-refurbished and has been judged by UC Hastings to be in need of substantial repair and improvement, including major architectural engineering work. The college has plans to create a 400-seat performing arts venue within the Great Hall.

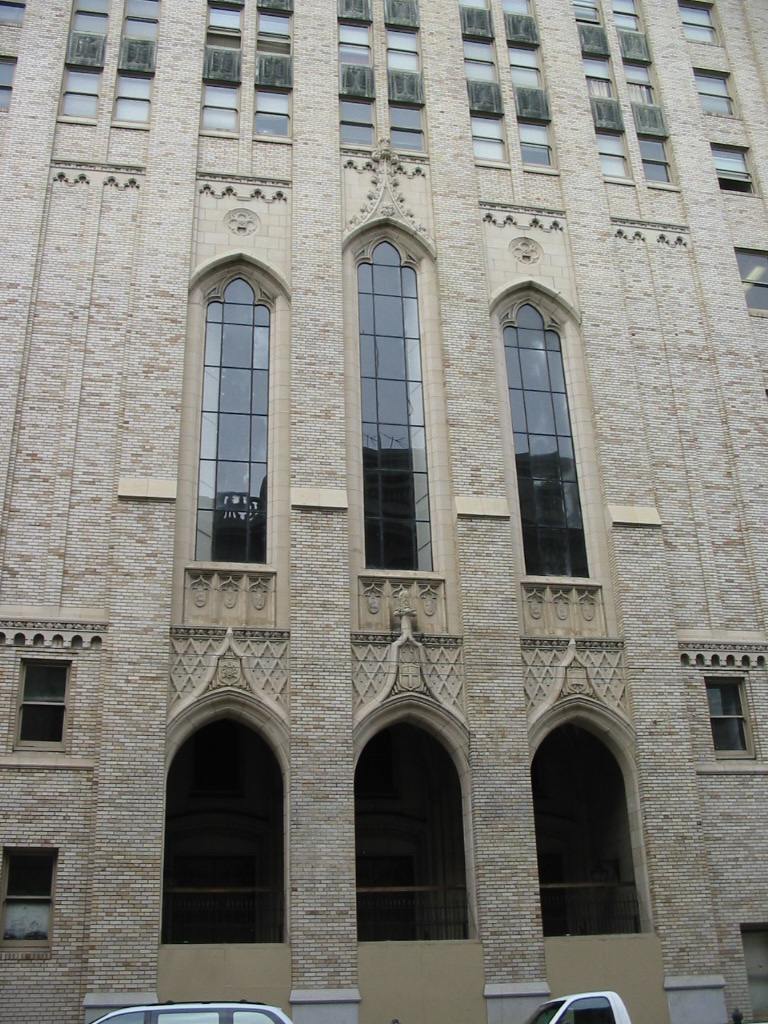
Traces of the Temple Methodist Episcopal Church include the original three entrance doors and decorative windows, designed in the Gothic Revival architecture style

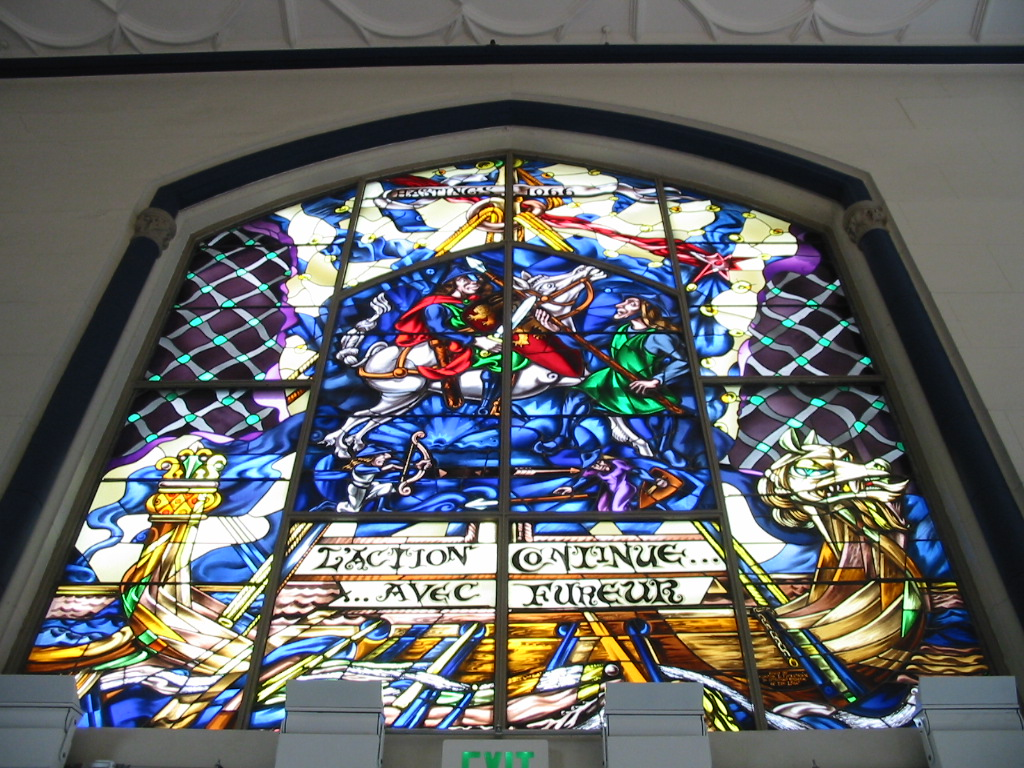
The Battle of Hastings (1066) as depicted on a stained glass window over the main entrance. The French phrase (l'action continue ... avec fureur) translates to "the battle rages on".

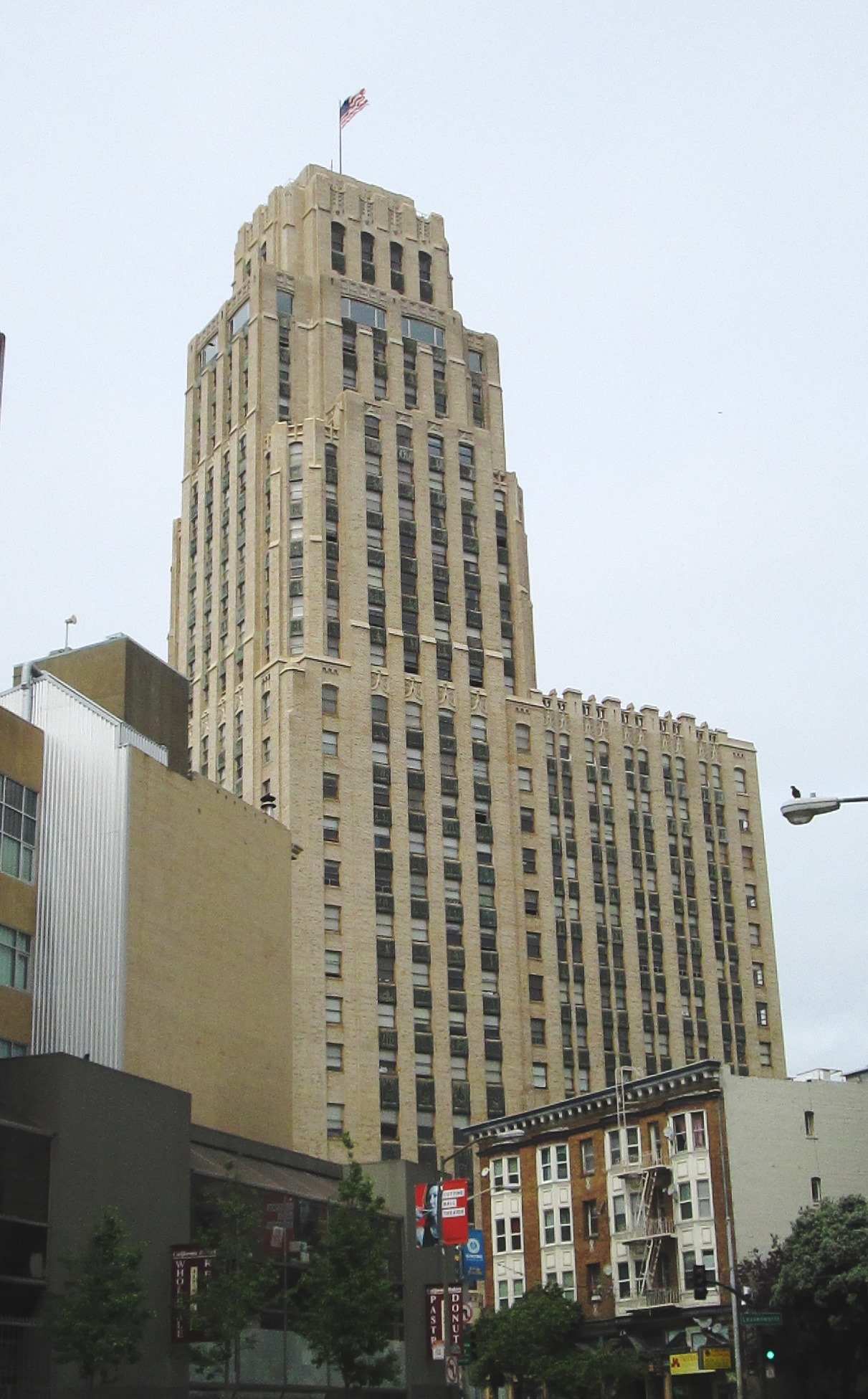
The building from the southeast

== See also ==
- Eliel Saarinen's Tribune Tower design
- San Francisco's tallest buildings
