= The Daring Young Man =

1935 film by William A. Seiter

- Directed by: William A. Seiter
- Screenplay by: Sam Hellman; William Hurlbut; Glenn Tryon
- Story by: Claude Binyon; Sidney Skolsky
- Produced by: Robert Kane
- Starring: James Dunn; Mae Clarke; Neil Hamilton; Sidney Toler; Warren Hymer; Stanley Fields
- Cinematography: Merritt B. Gerstad
- Production company: Fox Film Corporation
- Distributed by: Fox Film Corporation
- Release date: May 24, 1935
- Running time: 73 minutes
- Country: United States
- Language: English

The Daring Young Man is a 1935 American comedy film directed by William A. Seiter and written by Sam Hellman, William Hurlbut and Glenn Tryon. The film stars James Dunn, Mae Clarke, Neil Hamilton, Sidney Toler, Warren Hymer and Stanley Fields. This is the film to be released on May 24, 1935, by Fox Film Corporation. This was the last film for Fox Film Corporation before it merged with Twentieth Century Pictures to form 20th Century-Fox.

== Plot ==
Two top reporters, male and female, fall in love and plan to marry, however as she waits for the groom at the church he never shows up. He was enticed into going undercover in a jail to expose gang activity inside the jail, being promised a lot of money and prestige for the story. Before leaving for the assignment he writes a letter to his beloved, but his publisher rips it up, so she thinks he has gotten cold feet and she gets angry at him for deserting her. Meanwhile, he exposes corrupt activity inside the jail. Will his beloved ever find out the truth of why he never showed up to marry her?

== Cast ==
- James Dunn as Don McLane
- Mae Clarke as Martha Allen
- Neil Hamilton as Gerald Raeburn
- Sidney Toler as Warden Palmer
- Warren Hymer as Pete Hogan
- Stanley Fields as Rafferty
- Madge Bellamy as Sally
- Frank Melton as Cub Reporter
- Raymond Hatton as Flaherty
- Jack La Rue as Cubby
- Arthur Treacher as Col. Baggott
- Dorothy Christy as Helen Kay
- Robert Gleckler as Editor Hooley
- William Pawley as Muggs
- Phil Tead as Cripps
