= Anna Amendola =

Italian actress (1931–2019)

Anna Amendola della Torre di Lavagna
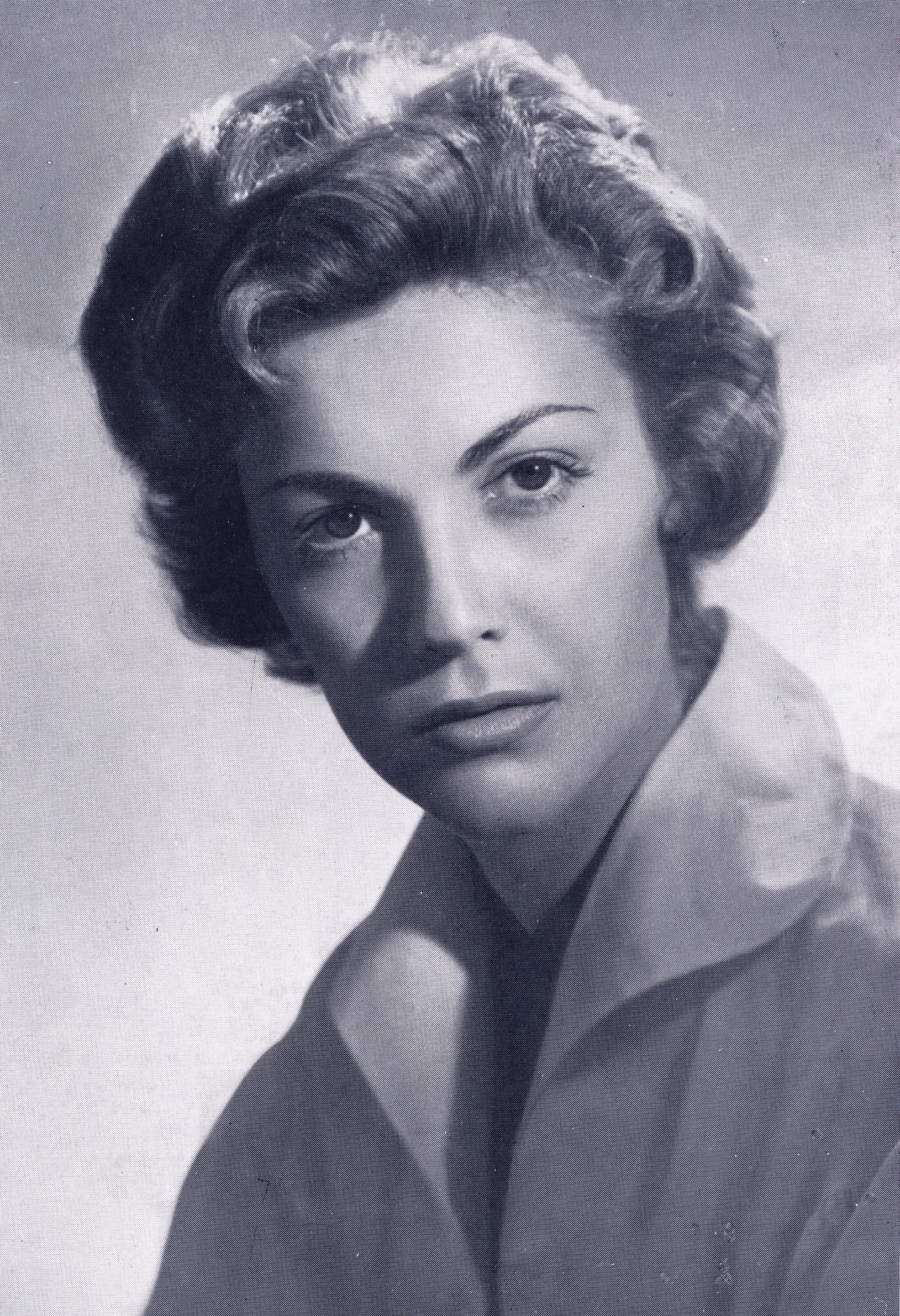
- Anna Amendola in 1953
- Born: 23 September 1931; Rome, Italy
- Died: 31 August 2019 (aged 91); Rome, Italy
- Occupation: Actor
- Years active: 1952-1958

Anna Amendola (23 September 1931 – 31 August 2019) was an Italian actress.

She appeared in more than ten movies from 1952 to 1958.

Amendola died in Rome on 31 August 2019, at the age of 87.

Mother of Francesca della Torre and Luca della Torre.

== Selected filmography ==
Year	Title	Role	Notes
1953	We, the Women (Siamo donne (original title))	Anna	
1954	Sins of Casanova	Gertrude	
1954	Cañas y barro	Nela	
1954	Loves of Three Queens	Minerva	
1954	Daughters of Destiny		
1955	French Cancan	Esther Georges	
1955	Sins of Casanova	Geltrude von Klaudof	
1955	Napoleon	Caroline Murat (uncredited)	
1957	Mattino di primavera		
1957	Sendas marcadas	Tesa	
1957	Mañana...	Chica	
1958	Avenida Roma, 66		
