= Son of Sinbad =

1955 film by Ted Tetzlaff

- Directed by: Ted Tetzlaff
- Written by: Jack Pollexfen; Aubrey Wisberg
- Produced by: Robert Sparks
- Starring: Dale Robertson; Vincent Price; Sally Forrest
- Cinematography: William E. Snyder
- Edited by: Roland Gross; Frederic Knudtson
- Music by: Victor Young
- Distributed by: RKO Radio Pictures
- Release date: June 1, 1955
- Running time: 91 minutes
- Country: United States
- Language: English

Son of Sinbad is a 1955 American adventure film directed by Ted Tetzlaff. It takes place in the Middle East and consists of a wide variety of characters, including over 127 women.

The film was shot in 1953 and planned to be released in 3D. Because of difficulties with the Motion Picture Production Code, studio head Howard Hughes shelved the film until 1955, when it was converted to the Tushinsky SuperScope process, in 2-D (flat). It is Vincent Price's fourth and final 3-D film.

Dale Robertson (as Sinbad) co-stars with Sally Forrest and Price, as well as Lili St. Cyr, a well-known stripteaser of the 1950s.

== Plot ==
In ancient Baghdad, the poet Omar Khayyám searches for his friend Sinbad, the son of the legendary sailor, and finds him outside the palace of the Khalif. Although a reward has been offered for Sinbad's capture, he sneaks into the palace undeterred and recites Omar's poetry to woo Nerissa, a harem girl. When a slave exposes him, both Sinbad and Omar are apprehended and brought before the Khalif.

Also on trial are Greek scholar Simon Aristides and his daughter Kristina, a childhood friend of Sinbad, who have been falsely accused of theft. The Khalif orders the execution of all four, but his advisor, Jiddah, urges him to first meet Murad, an ambassador of Tamerlane whose invading forces threaten the city. Murad demands hospitality while his troops prepare for an attack.

To save Kristina, Sinbad reveals that Simon possesses the secret of Greek fire, an explosive formula. Simon agrees to demonstrate the weapon in exchange for freedom for himself, Kristina, Sinbad, and Omar. The Khalif consents—though Sinbad and Omar remain imprisoned. During the demonstration, Simon hypnotizes Kristina to recite the formula. Unbeknownst to them, Jiddah and Murad secretly observe but are unable to identify the chemicals being used.

Impressed, the Khalif agrees to release Sinbad and Omar the next morning. Kristina confides in Ameer, who is in love with Sinbad, asking her to inform him of his imminent freedom. Despite her jealousy, Ameer delivers the message. However, she later discovers that Kristina has been abducted and Simon murdered. Murad has taken Kristina and the chemical bottles. Before being captured by Jiddah, Ameer sends a warning via carrier pigeon.

While torturing Ameer for information, Jiddah discovers a tattoo indicating her connection to the Forty Thieves—a legendary group once led by Sinbad's father. Ameer confirms their descendants remain active, leading Jiddah to suspect the warning was sent to them. Meanwhile, Sinbad and Omar escape their cell and confront the Khalif. Sinbad offers to rescue Kristina in exchange for gold, a pardon, and the promise of becoming second in command. The Khalif agrees, unaware Jiddah has alerted Murad.

In the desert, Ameer finds Sinbad and Omar and reveals Murad is traveling with disguised Tartars posing as merchants. The Forty Thieves plan an ambush at the caravan's first camp. Sinbad hides underground near the camp, intending to infiltrate Kristina's tent. When Murad unwittingly removes Sinbad's breathing reed, he is forced to emerge but manages to rescue Kristina.

The Forty Thieves—revealed to be all women—launch a surprise attack and reclaim Simon's chemical bottles. At their hideout, Sinbad uses the command "open sesame" to enter with Kristina and Omar. The Thieves' leader, Ghenia, grants refuge. Kristina confesses her love for Omar, while Ameer rejects Sinbad's advances due to his wandering affections.

Murad's forces soon besiege the cave. Sinbad hypnotizes Kristina to recall the Greek fire formula. With the Thieves’ help, he creates the explosive and defeats Murad's army in battle. Sinbad slays Murad in a duel, and peace is restored. He persuades the Thieves to accompany him to Baghdad and make peace with the Khalif.

At the palace, the Khalif prepares to punish Sinbad for failure, unaware of Jiddah's betrayal. When Sinbad arrives with Kristina and the victorious raiders, the Khalif embraces him and orders Jiddah's punishment. Omar is appointed royal poet, the Thieves are pardoned, and Sinbad is named second in command. He then proposes to Ameer, asking her to be his bride.

== Cast ==
- Dale Robertson as Sinbad
- Sally Forrest as Ameer
- Vincent Price as Omar Khayyám
- Lili St. Cyr as Nerissa
- Mari Blanchard as Kristina
- Leon Askin as Khalif
- Raymond Greenleaf as Simon Aristides
- Mary Ellen Bromfield as Dancer (credited as Kalantan)
- Nejla Ates as Dancer
- Pat Sheehan as Harem Girl
- Jackie Loughery as Harem Girl
- Carol Brewster as Harem Girl
- Mary Morlas as Harem Girl
- Joy Langstaff as Tartar Girl
- Kim Novak as Raider
- Roxanne Arlen as Raider
- Laurie Carroll as Arab Woman

== Production ==
The filming of Son of Sinbad began in May 1953. Although the credited cast was chosen through auditioning, a lot of the harem girls, Tartar girls, slave girls, trumpeters, and raiders were selected through a series of pageants and contests that Howard Hughes either saw or held. Joan Pastin, Marvleen Prentice, and Dawn Oney were chosen through a contest in Modern Screen arranged by Howard Hughes, while several others were selected because they were finalists in Queen of the Los Angeles Home Show of 1952. Sally Forrest was cast after Piper Laurie fell ill, while Vincent Price was on contract with RKO Studios when he was given the role of Omar Khayyam. Dee Gee Sparks and Nancy Dunn were cast in walk-on roles because their fathers (Robert Sparks and Linwood Dunn) were the producers of the film. Leonteen Danies was cast as a slave girl after being spotted at a dance academy. Pat Sheehan was offered a role while dining at Mimi's Kitchen with Howard Hughes. Suzanne Alexander was seen on a beach by Howard Hughes and subsequently offered a role.

Lili St. Cyr's voice was dubbed in the film at the request of Howard Hughes.

== Critical reception ==
The film—which foregrounds real-life stripper St. Cyr amidst a Baghdad harem housing dozens of nubile starlets (and which, decades after the fact, was frankly deemed "a voyeur's delight" by no less authoritative a source than veteran RKO executive Vernon Harbin's 1982 as-told-to tome, The RKO Story)—was promptly condemned by the Catholic Legion of Decency almost a month prior to its scheduled release date.

Adverse publicity notwithstanding, the consensus amongst critics, while similarly negative, was much more focused on the affront to viewers' intelligence and artistic sensibilities than to their modesty or morals. Case in point, Hollywood Reporter critic Jack Moffitt.

This movie, in its story and in its approach to sex, seems to be made for (and by) adolescents of all ages. Since there are many adolescents in the world, it may make money. If it does, bad taste all over the world will have been given encouragement. I shall leave the moral issues involved to the theologians and will confine myself to deploring 'Son of Sinbad' as an affront to the public intelligence.

Moffitt goes on to quote advice purportedly given Roman emperor Nero by Gaius Petronius Arbiter. "One naked woman can be an inspiration, but three dozen are merely a congestion." Concluding his review with some measure of silver lining, Moffitt recalls being reminded during the film's waning moments that while "all good things must come to an end, it is comforting to know that bad things must too."

Albeit a tad less ready with the quip, Variety's Brog takes a similar tack, stating that "the RKO release rates more censure for the dull quality of its entertainment than for its moral values," adding that "one will be more inclined to laugh than pant at the manner in which sex is presented in the Robert Sparks production by the writing, direction and cast."

Nor were the dailies discernibly more charitable. New York Daily News critic Wanda Hale calls the film "one of those Technicolor costume things, big, gaudy and perpetually tiresome" while wondering "why RKO made it [and] who will want to see it besides the worshipping followers (fans to you) of the star Dale Robertson, who is a big, good-looking fellow, but better as a cowboy talking western jargon than as a swashbuckling hero reciting the immortal lines of Omar Khayyam."

Although most of America's papers of record evidently opted not to review the film at all, Los Angeles Times critic Philip K. Scheuer did plunge in, and did so with a vengeance. Doubling down on the sarcasm quotient, from the piece's "Flat on His Fez" headline, closely paraphrased from his third paragraph punch line, to the final paragraph plus, headlined "Suspicious Odor," Scheuer concludes, "[The film] has something to do with Sinbad's defeat of the invading Tamerlane through the use of 'Greek fire,' a noisome substance into which missiles are dipped and which burst into flame on contact. Of it Mr. Price remarks that 'if this doesn't destroy them, the smell of it will.' ... Which is dangerous talk for 'Son of Sinbad.' It could be misconstrued."

== See also ==
- List of American films of 1955
