= Mikel Conrad =

American actor (1919–1982)

Mikel Conrad (30 July 1919 – 11 September 1982) was an American actor and film director, writer and producer. He was born in Columbus, Ohio and died in Los Angeles, California at the age of 63.

== Filmography ==
=== Actor ===
- Untamed Fury (1947) - 'Gator-Bait' Blair
- Border Feud (1947) - Elmore
- The Gangster (1947) - Thug (uncredited)
- Check Your Guns (1949) - Henchman Ace Banyon
- The Wreck of the Hesperus (1948) - Angus McReady
- Phantom Valley (1948) - Henchman Craig (uncredited)
- The Gallant Blade (1948) - Officer (uncredited)
- The Man From Colorado (1948) - Morris (uncredited)
- South of St. Louis (1949) - Lieutenant (uncredited)
- Take One False Step (1949) - Freddie Blair
- Mr. Soft Touch (1949) - Officer Miller (uncredited)
- Sand (1949) - Tony (uncredited)
- Arctic Manhunt (1949) - Mike Jarvis
- Abbott and Costello Meet the Killer, Boris Karloff (1949) - Sgt. Stone
- Illegal Entry (1949)
- The Flying Saucer (1950) - Mike Trent
- Francis the Talking Mule (1950) - Major Garber
- The Bandit Queen (1950) - Captain Gray
- Million Dollar Pursuit (1951) - Louie Palino
- Westward the Women (1952) - Rose's Man (uncredited)
- Hoodlum Empire (1952) - Chunce (uncredited)
- Carson City (1952) - Workman (uncredited)
- Untamed Women (1952) - Steve Holloway
- Godzilla, King of the Monsters! (1956) - George Lawrence (uncredited)

=== Director ===
- The Flying Saucer (1950)
