= Rope of Sand =

1949 film by William Dieterle

- Theatrical release poster
- Directed by: William Dieterle
- Screenplay by: Walter Doniger; Additional dialogue: John Paxton
- Story by: Walter Doniger
- Produced by: Hal B. Wallis
- Starring: Burt Lancaster; Paul Henreid; Claude Rains; Peter Lorre
- Cinematography: Charles Lang
- Edited by: Warren Low
- Music by: Franz Waxman
- Production company: Wallis-Hazen
- Distributed by: Paramount Pictures
- Release date: August 4, 1949 (New York City)
- Running time: 104 minutes
- Country: United States
- Languages: English; Afrikaans
- Box office: $2,250,000

Rope of Sand is a 1949 American adventure-suspense film noir directed by William Dieterle, produced by Hal Wallis, and starring Burt Lancaster and three stars from Wallis's Casablanca – Paul Henreid, Claude Rains and Peter Lorre. The film introduces Corinne Calvet and features Sam Jaffe, John Bromfield, and Kenny Washington in supporting roles. The picture is set in South West Africa. Desert portions of the film were shot in Yuma, Arizona.

== Plot ==
Hunting guide Mike Davis (Burt Lancaster) comes across a cache of diamonds in a mining area, located in a remote region of South West Africa. He is caught by the mine's police, but refuses to reveal the diamonds' location, even under torture at the hands of the diamond company's security chief, Paul Vogel (Paul Henreid). He leaves South Africa for some time.

Davis returns to get the diamonds, which he still expects will be at the spot where he found them. The mining company's owner, Martingale (Claude Rains), tries to find out where the diamonds can be found by guile rather than force. He hires a beautiful prostitute, Suzanne Renaud (Corinne Calvet), to seduce Davis and get him to reveal the secret location. Davis plans an illegal entry into the diamond mining area to retrieve the diamonds, then escape to Portuguese Angola. Meanwhile, Vogel is attracted to Suzanne and offers to marry her but Suzanne is attracted to Davis, who is more interested in his diamonds than Suzanne. Davis finds the diamonds, but Martingale threatens to kill Suzanne unless Davis gives him the diamonds. Davis gives up the diamonds, and ends up leaving the country with Suzanne, discovering that he loves her more than the diamonds.

== Cast ==
- Burt Lancaster as Mike Davis
- Paul Henreid as Vogel
- Claude Rains as Martingale
- Corinne Calvet as Suzanne
- Peter Lorre as Toady
- Sam Jaffe as Dr. Hunter
- John Bromfield as Thompson, a guard
- Mike Mazurki as Pierson, a guard
- Kenny Washington as John
- Edmund Breon as Chairman
- Hayden Rorke as Ingram
- David Thursby as Henry, the bartender
- Josef Marais as Specialty Singer
- Miranda Marais as Specialty Singer

== Background ==
According to the Paramount Collection at the Academy of Motion Picture Arts and Sciences (AMPAS) library, the desert sequences were shot in Yuma, Arizona.

Paul Henreid was blacklisted from major studios at the time, but says he was cast because Dieterle was an old friend of his, and Hal Wallis was supportive of the actor being cast. Henreid said the role was a departure for him, but "it had the greatest lines in the script, and I had a lot of fun doing it."

== Reception ==
=== Critical response ===
Film critic Glenn Erickson reflected on the background of the film, and how it was received when first released: "A polished production on all technical levels, the gritty Rope of Sand was filmed from a screenplay purchased by producer Wallis specifically for Burt Lancaster in 1947. Although William Dieterle's direction is capable, the script works too hard to introduce an overly familiar collection of stock thriller types ... Critics generally liked Lancaster's performance, even if they slighted the work of Claude Rains and Peter Lorre, and saved the bulk of their praise for Paul Henried's nasty villain. Lancaster's own assessment of the film was unprintable, but he was quoted at a time when he was itching to move on to more interesting roles."

== Accolades ==
Nominated

- Golden Globes: Best Screenplay, Walter Doniger, 1950.
