= Mary Ellen Bromfield =

American actress, dancer and author (1928–2023)

- Born: Mary Ellen Tillotson; March 13, 1928; Fresno County, California, U.S.
- Died: July 5, 2023 (aged 95); Lake Havasu City, Arizona, U.S.
- Other names: Kalantan; Aleene Dupree
- Occupations: Actress; dancer; author
- Years active: 1946–2023
- Spouses: Adolfo Martinez (m. 19??; div. 19??); John Bromfield (m. 1962; died 2005)

Mary Ellen Bromfield (March 13, 1928 – July 5, 2023) was an American actress, dancer and author. As a dancer she performed under the stage names Kalantan and Aleene Dupree and later appeared in the 3D adventure film Son of Sinbad (1953).

== Background ==
Mary Bromfield was born in Fresno County, California on March 13, 1928, to Frank and Edna Tillotson. She attended the University of the Pacific in Stockton, California, earning a Bachelor of Arts in music.

=== Dance and screen career ===
Bromfield began performing as a dancer in the late 1940s, headlining in venues in Las Vegas, New Orleans, and Mexico City. She adopted the stage name Kalantan during her engagements in Mexico. As Kalantan, she made her first screen appearance in Howard Hughes’s 1953 3D production Son of Sinbad.

=== Later life and writing ===
After marrying actor John Bromfield in 1962, Bromfield retired from performing and later worked in sales for a technology company. She subsequently turned to writing and has published several novels, including Gulls Haven (2011), as well as her autobiography, Kalantan: Behind the Curtain (2016).

=== Personal life and death ===
Bromfield first married hair stylist Adolfo Martinez in Mexico City; the couple later divorced. She married John Bromfield in 1962 and remained with him until his death in 2005.

Bromfield died on July 5, 2023, at the age of 95.

== Filmography ==
- Midnight Frolics (1946)
- Son of Sinbad (1953)

== Books ==
- Gulls Haven (2011)
- Kalantan: Behind the Curtain (2016)
- Stories of Crime (2016)
- The Murder of Ellena (2016)
- The Ghosts of Blue Manor (2017)
- Moss (2017)
- Tired (2018)
- I'm Laughing (2018)
- It Happens (2018)
- The Specter (2018)
- Listen to the Quiet (2018)
- Wouldn't You Know (2019)
- The House on the Hill (2019)
- Asa Crow (2019)
- Fear (2020)
- No Time to Lose (2020)
- Sam: I Am Woman (2021)
