= Corinne Calvet =

French actress (1925–2001)

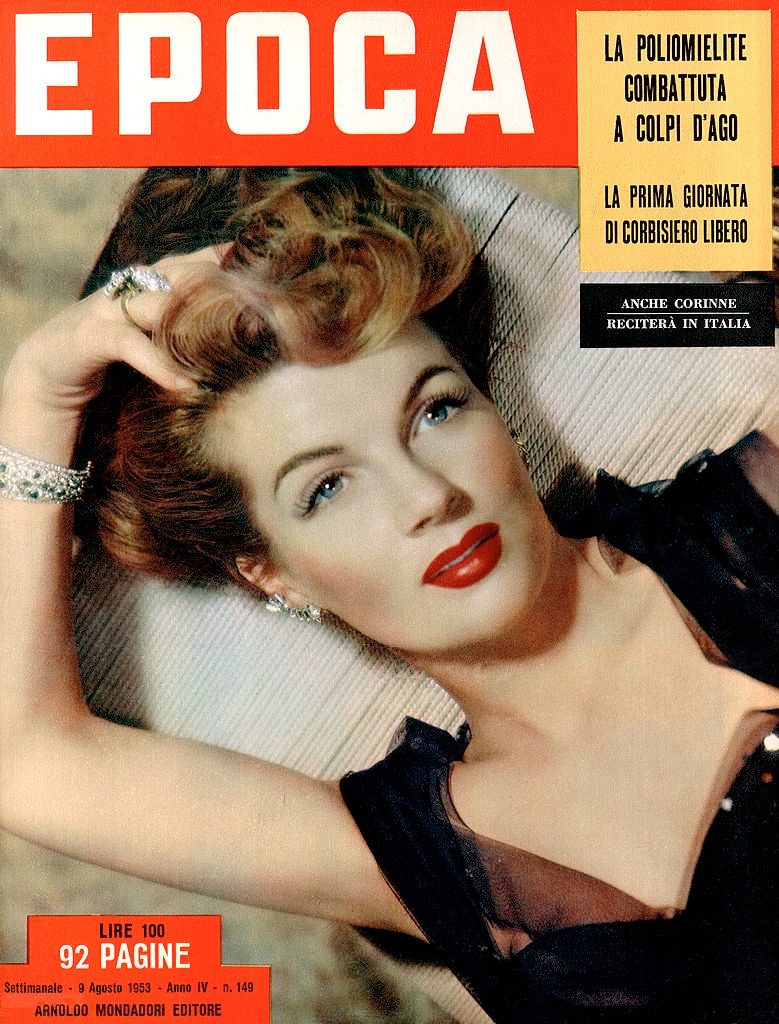
- Calvet on the August 1953 cover of Epoca
- Born: Corinne Dibos; April 30, 1925; Paris, France
- Died: June 23, 2001 (aged 76); Los Angeles, California, U.S.
- Education: Sorbonne University
- Occupation: Actress
- Years active: 1945–1988
- Known for: Rope of Sand; Sailor Beware; When Willie Comes Marching Home; What Price Glory; My Friend Irma Goes West; On the Riviera; Thunder in the East; Powder River; Flight to Tangier
- Spouses: John Bromfield (m. 1948; div. 1954) Jeffrey Stone (m. 1955; div. 1960) Robert J. Wirt (m. 1968; sep. 1971)
- Children: 1

Corinne Calvet (April 30, 1925 – June 23, 2001), born Corinne Dibos, was a French actress who appeared mostly in American films. According to one obituary, she was promoted "as a combination of Marlene Dietrich and Rita Hayworth", but her persona failed to live up to this description, though the fault lay partially with a string of mediocre films. She eventually became better known for her turbulent private life and some well-publicised legal battles.

== Biography ==
=== Early life ===
Calvet was born in Paris. Her mother was a scientist who played a part in the development of thermally resistant glass. One of her sisters, a doctor, died when taken hostage by the Germans during the war. She and her father had to flee Paris when the Germans came. Calvet studied criminal law at the Sorbonne. "A lawyer needs exactly what an actor needs, strong personality, persuasive powers and a good voice," she said later.

While studying law, she often went to the Deux Magots café where her group of friends included Jean-Paul Sartre, Jean Cocteau and Jean Marais, which prompted her to try acting. Marais advised her to join Charles Dullin's acting school, where he had trained alongside Simone Signoret and Gérard Philipe. She then studied at L'Ecole du Cinema.

=== French acting career ===
Calvet made her debut in French radio, stage plays, and cinema in the 1940s. She appeared uncredited in the film Blind Desire (1945) and was the French voice of Rita Hayworth in dubbed versions of American movies.

She had a speaking part in Petrus (1946) starring Fernandel. Her father did not want her to use the family name, so she chose "Calvet" from a name on a bottle of wine (she felt that alliteration had been lucky for Michèle Morgan, Dannielle Darrieux, and Simone Signoret).

Calvet played a model in We Are Not Married (1946) and had a supporting role in Last Chance Castle (1947).

=== Hal Wallis and 20th Century Fox ===
According to one obituary, "Just after the Second World War, most of the major Hollywood studios were importing female talent from Europe in the hopes of finding another Garbo, Dietrich or Bergman to lend exoticism to their product. Alida Valli, Hildegard Knef and Denise Darcel were among those who had varying success during the period, and Corinne Calvet was the choice of Paramount."

The studio was looking for a Frenchwoman to play a suspected collaborator in Sealed Verdict (1948). It signed Calvet in February 1947. In April the studio announced she would be called "Corinne Calvat". Eventually the studio decided Calvet was too young, and in August, cast Florence Marly instead.

Paramount did not use her for a year. Calvet spent that time training and working on her English; however, Hedda Hopper later claimed she spent that time "in nightclubs instead of learning English." Her visa was nearly rescinded because her association with the existentialist element in France was suspicious to the House Un-American Activities Committee. Paramount dropped her.

Calvet did a test for MGM, which signed her for six months from July 1948. She was in a car accident but recovered. She married actor John Bromfield who was under contract to Hal B. Wallis. Wallis saw a test of Calvet, and in August 1948, took her back to Paramount for a role in Rope of Sand (1949) opposite Burt Lancaster and Paul Henreid, directed by William Dieterle.

She was given star billing in her second Hollywood film, When Willie Comes Marching Home (1950), starring Dan Dailey and directed by John Ford for 20th Century Fox. Fox bought half her contract from Paramount, having the right to use her for five films.

Wallis put her in My Friend Irma Goes West (1950) a film best remembered for being the second movie released starring Martin and Lewis. "I couldn't believe he would cast me in such a script", she later recalled. "Rope of Sand had made me a valuable property. Doing this film would ruin my chances of rising higher as a dramatic star."

In January 1950, Hedda Hopper claimed that Calvert's "ego is [now] so inflated I doubt if she could get inside a jumping rope...Corinne thinks she's god's gift to America instead of being grateful for the opportunity after flopping at two studios."

At Paramount, she did Quebec (1951) with John Drew Barrymore, a film about the Lower Canada Rebellion.

20th Century Fox borrowed her to play Danny Kaye's leading lady in On the Riviera (1951), which earned her a Roscoe by the Harvard Lampoon for giving one of the worst film performances of 1951.

Wallis co starred her with Joseph Cotten in Peking Express (1951) and Martin and Lewis in Sailor Beware (1952).

John Ford re-teamed her with Dailey in What Price Glory (1952). Calvet began appearing on television shows like Lux Video Theatre.

She made a television appearance on The Colgate Comedy Hour with Donald O'Connor on February 3, 1952. She also appeared on the game show The Name's the Same, in the "I'd Like to Be" segment, where she stumped the panel with her choice of Rocky Marciano.

At Paramount, she did Thunder in the East (1953) with Alan Ladd, then at Fox was Rory Calhoun's leading lady in Powder River (1953).

Paramount put her in the thriller Flight to Tangier (1953), and she appeared on Ford Television Theatre. She developed a night club act and toured the U.S.

In April 1954, she tried to commit suicide.

Calvert made two films at Universal: The Far Country (1954) with James Stewart, and So This Is Paris (1954) with Tony Curtis. In 1955, she became an American citizen.

=== Return to Europe ===
Calvet returned to France to star in One Step to Eternity (1955), then went to Italy to appear in Le ragazze di San Frediano (1955) and Sins of Casanova (1955).

In February 1955, it was announced she would star in a TV series based on the radio show Cafe Istanbul but it appears to not have been made.

She made Operazione notte (1957) in Italy.

Calvet went back to Hollywood to appear in episodes of Climax!, Studio One in Hollywood, and Richard Diamond, Private Detective. She had the lead in Plunderers of Painted Flats (1959) and supported George Sanders in Bluebeard's Ten Honeymoons (1960).

Upset with her treatment in Hollywood, Calvet "decided to return to France to make her headquarters" in 1960.

She did continue to work in the U.S., appearing in Hemingway's Adventures of a Young Man (1962) and Apache Uprising (1965) (with Calhoun) as well as episodes of The DuPont Show of the Week, Burke's Law, and Batman.

=== Later career ===
Calvet's later appearances include Pound (1970) by Robert Downey Sr., The Phantom of Hollywood (1974), an episode of Police Story, Too Hot to Handle (1977), The French Atlantic Affair, an episode of Starsky & Hutch, and She's Dressed to Kill (1979).

She studied at the Arica Institute, a Human Potential Movement group, and made a new career as a hypnotherapist, specializing in regressing people to their past lives..

Her last appearances were in Hart to Hart (1979), Dr. Heckyl and Mr. Hype (1980), The Sword and the Sorcerer (1982), and Side Roads (1988).

In her memoir, titled Has Corinne Been a Good Girl? (1983), she stated that the roles she played for Hollywood studios never challenged her acting ability. In 1958, referring to being cast as a French temptress, she told an interviewer "If I had come to Hollywood as a dramatic actress, I never would have been Corinne Calvet, and you never would have been sitting here talking to me."

== Personal life ==
Calvet was married three times. Her first marriage was to actor John Bromfield (1948 – March 17, 1954), who co-starred with her in Rope of Sand and who she claimed had been ordered to marry her by his studio. She then married actor Jeffrey Stone (1955–1960) and producer Robert J. Wirt (1968 – October 1971). All three marriages ended in divorce.

She had a son with Jeffrey Stone, John, born in 1956.

Between her last two marriages, she had a six-year, de facto relationship with millionaire Donald Scott, and they adopted a boy together. She later admitted she never earned more than $10,000 a year during this period.

Calvet once said "American men make wonderful husbands if you don't love them. But if you love them, don't marry them. I don't mean they are lousy lovers," Calvet said. "I just think they are little boys who don't know what they want. In America, you don't have romances, you have affairs. And these affairs really lack class."

=== Legal troubles ===
In 1952, Calvet sued actress Zsa Zsa Gabor for $1 million, accusing her of slander after Gabor was quoted as saying that Calvet was not really French, but was "a cockney English girl who couldn't even speak French a few years ago." The legal wrangle quickly disappeared from the media.

In 1967 her paramour of six years, Donald Scott, sued Calvet to recover $878,000 in assets that he had put under her name in an effort to hide them from his wife in a divorce battle. A two-week trial resulted in which Scott claimed Calvet had used voodoo to control him. The suit was settled with Calvet returning all but $200,000 of the disputed sum.

== Death ==
Calvet died June 23, 2001, in Los Angeles of an intracerebral hemorrhage, aged 76.

== Selected filmography ==
- Blind Desire (1945) – (uncredited)
- Petrus (1946) – Liliane
- We Are Not Married (1946) – Le modèle
- Last Chance Castle (1947) – Mme Tritonel
- Rope of Sand (1949) – Suzanne Renaud
- When Willie Comes Marching Home (1950) – Yvonne Le Tete
- My Friend Irma Goes West (1950) – Yvonne Yvonne
- Quebec (1951) – Mme. Stephanie Durossac aka La Fleur
- On the Riviera (1951) – Colette
- Peking Express (1951) – Danielle Grenier
- Thunder in the East (1951) – Lizette Damon
- Sailor Beware (1952) – Herself
- What Price Glory (1952) – Charmaine
- Powder River (1953) – Frenchie Dumont
- Flight to Tangier (1953) – Nicki
- The Far Country (1954) – Renee Vallon
- So This Is Paris (1954) – Suzanne Sorel
- One Step to Eternity (1954) – Véra Volpone
- Le ragazze di San Frediano (1955) – Bice
- Sins of Casanova (1955) – Luisa di Charpillon
- Operazione notte (1955)
- Plunderers of Painted Flats (1959) – Kathy Martin
- Bluebeard's Ten Honeymoons (1960) – Odette
- Hemingway's Adventures of a Young Man (1962) – Contessa
- Apache Uprising (1965) – Janice MacKenzie
- Pound (1970)
- The Phantom of Hollywood (1974, TV Movie) – Mrs. Wickes
- Too Hot to Handle (1977) – Madame Ruanda
- The French Atlantic Affair (1979, TV Movie) – Colette
- Dr. Heckyl and Mr. Hype (1980) – Pizelle Puree
- The Sword and the Sorcerer (1982)
- Side Roads (1988) – (final film role)

== Radio appearances ==
Year	Program	Episode/source
1953	Broadway Playhouse	Candle Light

== Bibliography ==
- Calvet, Corinne (1983). Has Corinne Been A Good Girl? : The Intimate Memoirs of a French Actress in Hollywood. New York: St. Martin's Press. ISBN 0-312-36405-9.
