= Bluebeard's Ten Honeymoons =

1960 British film by W. Lee Wilder

- Directed by: W. Lee Wilder
- Written by: Myles Wilder
- Produced by: Roy Parkinson
- Starring: George Sanders; Corinne Calvet; Jean Kent
- Cinematography: Stephen Dade
- Edited by: Tom Simpson
- Music by: Albert Elms
- Production company: Anglo Allied Pictures
- Distributed by: Warner-Pathé Distributors; Allied Artists Pictures
- Release date: 21 March 1960
- Running time: 92 minutes
- Country: United Kingdom
- Language: English

Bluebeard's Ten Honeymoons (also known as Bluebeard's 10 Honeymoons) is a 1960 British thriller film directed by W. Lee Wilder and starring George Sanders, Corinne Calvet, and Jean Kent. It was written by Myles Wilder. The story is loosely based on that of the real-life serial killer Henri Désiré Landru.

== Plot ==
Art dealer Henri Landru becomes infatuated with burlesque performer, Odette, who already has a lover and is only interested in Landru for money. She tricks Landru into thinking her mother is sick and needs money for an important operation. Landru vows to raise the money to fund the operation.

Landru attempts to find furniture that he can sell. He meets a young widow, Vivienne, who is hoping to sell some vintage furniture. He quickly charms Vivienne but when he later discovers she has sold her furniture to somebody else they quarrel, resulting in Vivienne's accidental death. Landru is able to cover up the manslaughter, but when he is able to easily claim Vivienne's furniture as his own and sell it he realises he has found an easy way to make money. Landru adopts several aliases and charms several wealthy, middle-aged women one by one, wooing them into marriage before killing them, usually by drugging them and then stabbing them.

Landru later sees Odette with her lover and realises she has been stringing him along the entire time. He lures her to his villa where he murders her.

Vivienne's sister has become suspicious over her disappearance but the police cannot help her without any evidence. She sets out to find Landru, eventually finding him at his rented villa. The police arrive and arrest Landru. The film ends with Landru's execution.

== Cast ==
- George Sanders as Henri Landru
- Corinne Calvet as Odette
- Jean Kent as Julienne Guillin
- Patricia Roc as Vivienne Dueaux
- Greta Gynt as Jeanette
- Maxine Audley as Cynthia
- Ingrid Hafner as Giselle
- Peter Illing as Lefevre
- George Coulouris as Lacoste
- Sheldon Lawrence as Pepi
- Paul Whitsun-Jones as station master
- Keith Pyott as estate agent
- Jack Melford as concierge
- Robert Rietty as bank clerk
- Mark Singleton as advertising clerk
- Ian Fleming as lawyer

== Production ==
It was shot at Elstree Studios near London and on location in Paris. The film's sets were designed by the art director Paul Sheriff.

== Reception ==
The Monthly Film Bulletin wrote: "Period, background and mood all fluctuate maddeningly ... and the unedifying narrative is developed along the most obvious lines imaginable. Landry's passion for Odette, especially as expressed by a weary George Sanders and an over-excited Corinne Calvet, seems a fantastic motive for the crimes themselves; and the somewhat nostalgic roster of victims (Patricia Roc, Jean Kent, Greta Gynt, etc.) strike one as nothing if not obliging. Paul Sherifi's art direction is suitably drab, but the craftsmanship otherwise is very poor."

Variety wrote: "This is a dull, preposterous yarn, allegedly based on the notorious career of Henri Landru, the French mass-killer. It drags tremendously, is acted only adequately, is written in cliches and directed with no sense of drama. In short, it's a sad little flop which is unlikely to make the grade even as a dualer. Not even the marquee value of George Sanders and Corinne Calvel can hide the fact that by all standards this one is a turkey,"

Leslie Halliwell said: "Another version of the story of Landru, alternating wildly between fantasy, farce and melodrama. Not a success in any of its moods."
