= Morris Chapel =

Chapel at University of the Pacific, California, United States

Coordinates: 37.9817°N 121.3089°W

Morris Chapel is a chapel located on the campus of the University of the Pacific in Stockton, California, United States. It was dedicated in 1942.

== History ==
In 1937, University of the Pacific president Tully C. Knoles proposed the construction of a chapel on the university's Stockton campus. Percy and Lillie Morris, having borne the majority of the financial burden of construction, were memorialized when the chapel was officially named and dedicated on April 19, 1942. In 1946, Ovid Ritter, Vice President of the university, wrote, “The College of the Pacific serves students of all faiths, and Morris Chapel renders service to them all without distinction at all times.”

== Faith ==
The Chapel was conceived as a spiritual ‘lighthouse’ for the University of the Pacific. It serves as the focal point for Christian worship on campus, both Protestant and Roman Catholic and it has also provided over the years a venue for the celebration of marriage for thousands of couples, both within and beyond the University community.

== Features ==
=== The Sanctuary Window ===
The great Sanctuary Window above and behind the altar originally consisted of three lancet windows, tall and narrow, which were installed in the Temple Methodist Church in San Francisco in 1930. These windows were removed when the church gave up its building in 1937. The windows were then on exhibition in 1939-1940, after which they were presented to Morris Chapel by the trustees of the Temple Methodist Church. The three separate windows were then merged into one large window consisting of the three great panels, and were installed for the "enrichment of our sanctuary and to the glory of God". The three principal figures from left to right represent Faith, Love (John 4:8; Jesus with the children), and Hope.

=== The Rose Window ===
At the opposite end of the Chapel over the gallery is the Rose Window, also a gift of Temple Methodist. It expresses symbolically the Life of Christ. Beginning with the lowest rosette, the descending dove symbolizes the Holy Spirit hovering over Mary the mother of Jesus at the moment of her conception. Moving clockwise, the five-pointed Star of Bethlehem recalls the Epiphany of Jesus to the wise men from the East, and subsequently to all nations beyond Israel. The next rosette portrays the figures of an open book, the Bible, the Word of God, which Jesus is and which he preached. At the top, the figure of the sun encircling the Greek abbreviation for Jesus’ name (IHC) recalls his title as the Sun of Righteousness. To the right, the chalice recalls his last Passover meal with his disciples, and the sacrament of the Eucharist that he instituted there. In the last rosette, the crown of thorns symbolizes his passion, and the abbreviation, INRI, recalls the legend that Pilate commanded to be placed over his head on the cross: Iesus Nazarenus Rex Iudaeorim, Jesus of Nazareth, King of the Jews. The central rosette of the Cross and the Crown recalls the Kingdom of God, which Christians believe was announced and initiated in the life, death, and resurrection of Jesus.

=== The Chancel Organ ===
The original organ was contributed by Samuel H. Kress of New York. The present organ, dedicated on April 2, 1992, is a two-manual tracker organ with 1,300 speaking pipes, custom-built by J. W. Walker & Sons, Ltd., of Suffolk, England. Its purchase, installation, and maintenance have been made possible through the generous gifts of alumni and friends of the University.

=== The Inscriptions ===
A remarkable feature of Morris Chapel is the inscription of the Apostles' Creed, written in Latin above the side arches in the nave. The Apostles' Creed is one of the earliest known professions of Christian faith, and was used as a baptismal confession in Rome as early as the second century of the Common Era. Over the chancel arch is inscribed the Kyrie (Kyrie eleison..., Christe eleison..., Kyrie eleison...; Lord have mercy..., Christ have mercy..., Lord have mercy...), another of the most ancient liturgical elements of Christian worship, used perhaps even by the very first Christian communities.

The chapel incorporates liturgical elements associated with early Christianity and architectural features influenced by medieval church design..
