= Sins of Casanova =

- DVD cover
- Directed by: Steno
- Written by: Lucio Fulci
- Produced by: Emo Bistolfi; Elio Gagliardo; Dario Sabatello
- Starring: Gabriele Ferzetti; Corinne Calvet
- Cinematography: Mario Bava
- Music by: Angelo Francesco Lavagnino
- Release date: 1955
- Running time: 95 minutes
- Country: Italy
- Language: Italian

Sins of Casanova (Italian: Le avventure di Giacomo Casanova, lit. 'Adventures of Giacomo Casanova') is a 1955 Italian comedy film directed by Steno. It stars Gabriele Ferzetti, Corinne Calvet and Irène Galter. Famed horror film director Lucio Fulci wrote the script, one of his earliest projects, while Mario Bava was the cinematographer.

== Cast ==
- Gabriele Ferzetti as Giacomo Casanova
- Corinne Calvet as Louse de Châtillon
- Irène Galter as Dolores
- Nadia Gray as Teresa
- Mara Lane as Barbara
- Marina Vlady as the bride
- Carlo Campanini as the valet
- Aroldo Tieri as José
- Anna Amendola as Gertrude
- Florence Arnaud as Angelica
- Fulvia Franco as Bettina
- Lia Di Leo as Lucrezia
- Nico Pepe as Bragadin
- Nerio Bernardi as the Inquisitor
- Ursula Andress as passenger in the carriage
