= Flirting with Fate (1938 film) =

1938 film by Frank McDonald

- Theatrical release poster
- Directed by: Frank McDonald
- Screenplay by: Joseph Moncure March; Charlie Melson; Ethel La Blanche
- Story by: Daniel Jarrett; A. Dorian Otvos
- Produced by: David L. Loew
- Starring: Joe E. Brown; Leo Carrillo; Beverly Roberts; Wynne Gibson; Steffi Duna; Charles Judels; Stanley Fields
- Cinematography: George Schneiderman
- Edited by: Robert O. Crandall
- Music by: Victor Young
- Production company: David L. Loew Productions
- Distributed by: Metro-Goldwyn-Mayer
- Release date: December 2, 1938
- Running time: 69 minutes
- Country: United States
- Language: English

Flirting with Fate is a 1938 American comedy film directed by Frank McDonald and written by Joseph Moncure March, Charlie Melson and Ethel La Blanche. The film stars Joe E. Brown, Leo Carrillo, Beverly Roberts, Wynne Gibson, Steffi Duna, Charles Judels and Stanley Fields. The film was released on December 2, 1938, by Metro-Goldwyn-Mayer.

== Cast ==
- Joe E. Brown as Dan Dixon
- Leo Carrillo as Sancho Ramirez
- Beverly Roberts as Patricia Lane
- Wynne Gibson as Bertha
- Steffi Duna as Carlita
- Charles Judels as Don Luis Garcia
- Stanley Fields as Fernando
- Leonid Kinskey as Pedro Lopez
- Chrispin Martin as Solado
- Inez Palange as Señora Lopez
- Irene Franklin as Hattie
- Jay Novello as Manuel Del Valle
- George Humbert as Del Rio
- Lew Kelly as Herbie
- Phillip Trent as Larry
- Ann Hovey as Ida
- Dick Botiller as Renaldo
- Carlos Villarías as Police Captain
