= John Bromfield =

Actor and commercial fisherman (1922–2005)

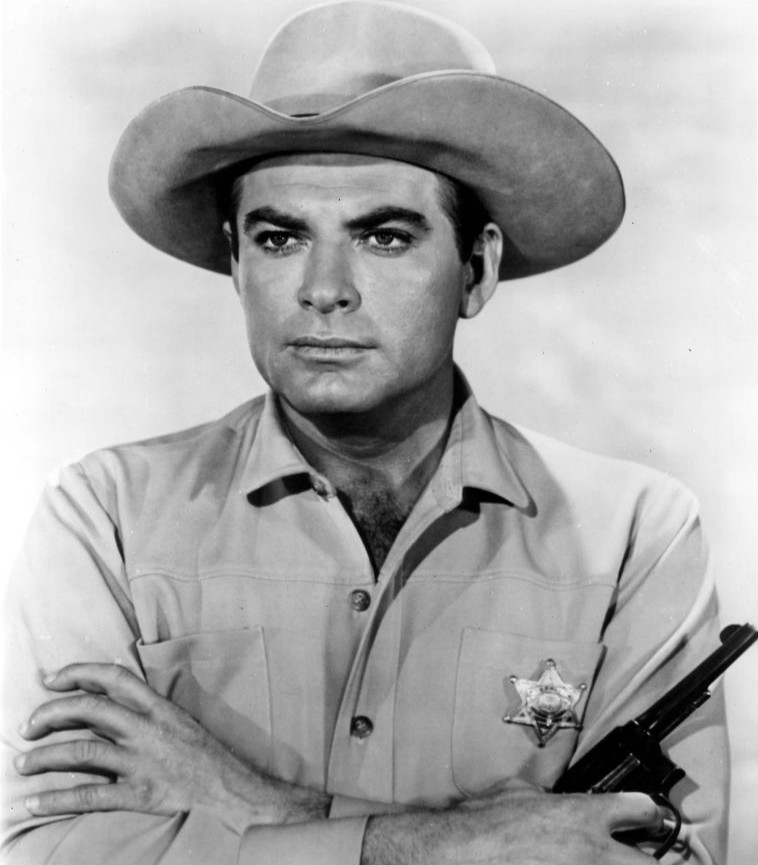
- Bromfield as Frank Morgan.
- Born: Farron Bromfield; June 11, 1922; South Bend, Indiana, U.S.
- Died: September 19, 2005 (aged 83); Palm Desert, California, U.S.
- Resting place: Forest Lawn Memorial Park, Glendale, California
- Occupations: Actor, commercial fisherman
- Years active: 1948–1960
- Spouses: Grace Landis (divorced) Corinne Calvet (m. 1948; div. 1954) Larri Thomas (m. 1955; div. 1959) Mary Ellen Bromfield (m. 1962–2005)

John Bromfield (born Farron Bromfield; June 11, 1922 – September 19, 2005) was an American actor and commercial fisherman.

== Early years ==
Farron Bromfield was born in South Bend, Indiana. He played football and was a boxing champion at Saint Mary's College of California, where he also lettered in football, baseball, track and swimming. In the 1940s, he gained his first acting experience at the La Jolla Playhouse.

Bromfield served in the United States Navy in World War II.

== Film ==
Bromfield's screen debut came in Harpoon (1948). The same year, he was cast as a detective in Sorry, Wrong Number, starring Burt Lancaster and Barbara Stanwyck for Paramount Pictures. In 1953, Bromfield appeared with Esther Williams, Van Johnson and Tony Martin in Easy to Love.

He also starred in horror films, including the 1955 3D production Revenge of the Creature, one of the Creature from the Black Lagoon sequels.

== Television ==
In the middle 1950s, Bromfield starred in two seasons of The Sheriff of Cochise and continued in the same 'Frank Morgan' role for another two seasons when the show became U.S. Marshal. He also appeared in other westerns, such as NBC's Frontier anthology series in the role of a sheriff in the episode "The Hanging at Thunder Butte Creek".

== Later years ==
In 1960, Bromfield retired from acting to produce sports shows and work as a commercial fisherman off Newport Beach, California.

== Personal life ==
Bromfield married Grace Landis while in college. They later divorced. He married actress Corinne Calvet in Boulder, Colorado, in 1948. They were divorced March 16, 1954. He also was divorced from actress/dancer Larri Thomas. He and his fourth wife, actress/dancer and author Mary Ellen Bromfield, were married 43 years.

== Death ==
Bromfield died September 18, 2005, at age 83 from renal failure in Palm Desert, California.

== Filmography ==
Year	Title	Role	Notes
1948	Sorry, Wrong Number	Joe - Detective	
1948	Harpoon	Michael Shand	
1949	Rope of Sand	Thompson	
1950	Paid in Full	Dr. Clark	
1950	The Furies	Clay Jeffords	
1952	The Cimarron Kid	Tulsa Jack	Uncredited
1952	Hold That Line	Biff Wallace	
1952	Flat Top	Ens. Snakehips McKay	
1952	Easy to Love	Hank	
1954	Ring of Fear	Armand St. Dennis	
1954	The Black Dakotas	Mike Daugherty	
1955	Revenge of the Creature	Joe Hayes	
1955	The Big Bluff	Ricardo De Villa	
1955	The Tender Trap	Actor in 'Easy to Love' - Movie on TV	Uncredited
1956	Three Bad Sisters	Jim Norton	
1956	Manfish	Captain Brannigan	
1956	Crime Against Joe	Joe Manning	
1956	Quincannon, Frontier Scout	Lt. Burke	
1956	Frontier Gambler	Deputy Marshal Curt Darrow	
1956	Hot Cars	Nick Dunn	
1956	Curucu, Beast of the Amazon	Rock Dean	
1961	Morgan keibu to nazô no otoko		(final film role)

== See also ==
- Horror films
