= One Step to Eternity =

1954 film

- Directed by: Henri Decoin
- Written by: Patricia McGerr (novel); Jean de Baroncelli; J.C. Eger; Henri Decoin
- Starring: Danielle Darrieux; Michel Auclair; Corinne Calvet; Lyla Rocco
- Cinematography: Robert Lefebvre
- Edited by: Denise Reiss
- Music by: René Sylviano
- Production companies: CFC; Films EGE; Noria Film
- Distributed by: La Société des Films Sirius (France)
- Release date: 17 December 1954
- Running time: 90 minutes
- Countries: France; Italy
- Language: French

One Step to Eternity (French:Bonnes à tuer, Italian:Quattro donne nella notte) is a 1954 French-Italian thriller film directed by Henri Decoin and starring Danielle Darrieux, Michel Auclair and Corinne Calvet. It was shot at the Boulogne Studios in Paris. The film's sets were designed by the art director Jean d'Eaubonne with costumes by Pierre Balmain.

== Plot ==
A French newspaper editor invites his wife, ex-wife, mistress and intended fiancée to his apartment, planning to murder one of them.

== Cast ==
- Danielle Darrieux as Constance Andrieux dite Poussy
- Michel Auclair as François Roques dit Larry
- Corinne Calvet as Véra Volpone
- Miriam Di San Servolo as Maggy Lang
- Lyla Rocco as Cécile Germain-Thomas
- Gérard Buhr as William Jordan
- Roberto Risso as Mario Mirador
- Gil Delamare as Forestier
- Ky Duyen as Bao, le serviteur
- Émile Genevois as Le postier
- Jean Berton as Un inspecteur
- Jean Sylvère as L'aveugle
- Jacques Jouanneau as Le flic
- Raymond Gerome as Un client de la boîte
