= Stanley Fields (actor) =

American actor (1883–1941)

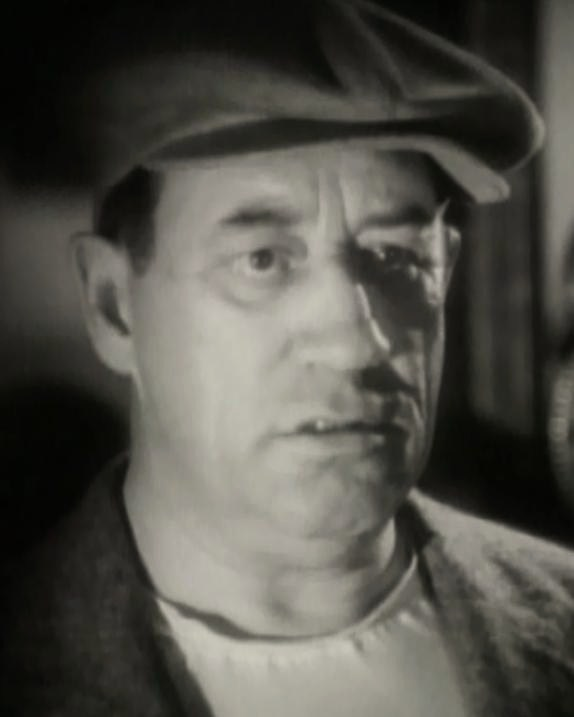
- Fields in Algiers (1938)
- Born: Walter L. Agnew; May 20, 1883; Allegheny City, Pennsylvania, U.S.
- Died: April 23, 1941 (aged 57); Los Angeles, California, U.S.
- Years active: 1929–1941
- Spouse: Alta Bailey

Stanley Fields (born Walter L. Agnew; May 20, 1883 – April 23, 1941) was an American actor.

== Biography ==
On Broadway, Fields performed in Fifty Miles from Boston (1908) and The Red Widow (1911). After that, for eight years, Fields performed in vaudeville with Frank Fay. he started on a film career with a screen debut as a gunman in her talkie New York Nights. In 1930, he signed a long-term contract with Paramount Pictures.

He died of a heart attack on April 23, 1941.

== Selected filmography ==
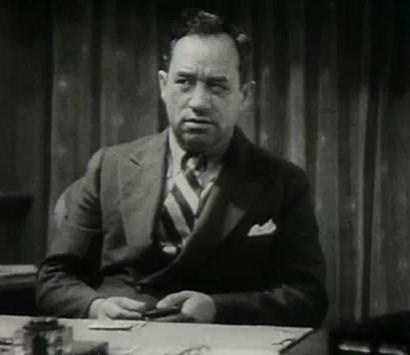
Stanley Fields in Little Caesar (1931).

- New York Nights (1929) - Hood (uncredited)
- Street of Chance (1930) - Dorgan
- Dangerous Paradise (1930) - Steamer Captain (uncredited)
- Mammy (1930) - Pig Eyes (uncredited)
- Captain of the Guard (1930) - Hangman (uncredited)
- Ladies Love Brutes (1930) - Mike Mendino
- The Border Legion (1930) - Hack Gulden
- Manslaughter (1930) - Peters
- Her Man (1930) - Al
- The Lottery Bride (1930) - Bartender (uncredited)
- See America Thirst (1930) - Spumoni
- Hook, Line and Sinker (1930) - McKay - Blackwell Henchman
- Little Caesar (1931) - Sam Vettori
- Cimarron (1931) - Lon Yountis
- Cracked Nuts (1931) - Gen. Bogardus
- City Streets (1931) - Blackie
- A Holy Terror (1931) - Butch Morgan
- Traveling Husbands (1931) - Dan Murphy - House Detective
- Skyline (1931) - Captain Breen
- Riders of the Purple Sage (1931) - Oldring
- Way Back Home (1931) - Rufe Turner
- Girl of the Rio (1932) - Mike
- Two Kinds of Women (1932) - Harry Glassman
- Girl Crazy (1932) - Lank Sanders
- Destry Rides Again (1932) - Sheriff Jerry Wendell
- The Mouthpiece (1932) - Mr. Pondapolis
- The Painted Woman (1932) - Yank
- Hell's Highway (1932) - F. E. Whiteside
- One Way Passage (1932) - Freighter Captain (uncredited)
- Rackety Rax (1932) - Gilatti
- Sherlock Holmes (1932) - Tony Ardetti
- The Kid from Spain (1932) - Jose
- Island of Lost Souls (1932) - Captain Davies
- The Constant Woman (1933) - Beef - Stagehand
- Destination Unknown (1933) - Gattallo
- Terror Aboard (1933) - Capt. Swanson
- He Couldn't Take It (1933) - Sweet Sue
- Roman Scandals (1933) - Slave Auctioneer (uncredited)
- Palooka (1934) - Blacky Wolfe (uncredited)
- Sing and Like It (1934) - Butch - Hood
- Strictly Dynamite (1934) - Pussy
- Many Happy Returns (1934) - Joe
- Name the Woman (1934) - Dawson
- Rocky Rhodes (1934) - Harp Haverty
- Kid Millions (1934) - Oscar Wilson
- Life Returns (1935) - Dog Catcher
- Helldorado (1935) - Truck Driver
- Baby Face Harrington (1935) - Mullens
- The Daring Young Man (1935) - Rafferty
- Mutiny on the Bounty (1935) - Muspratt
- Black Gold (1936) - Lefty Stevens
- It Had to Happen (1936) - Mug
- O'Malley of the Mounted (1936) - Red Jagger
- The Mine with the Iron Door (1936) - Dempsey
- The King Steps Out (1936) - Bruiser (uncredited)
- Show Boat (1936) - Backwoodsman with Gun (uncredited)
- Ticket to Paradise (1936) - Dan Kelly
- The Devil Is a Sissy (1936) - Joe
- The Gay Desperado (1936) - Butch
- Maid of Salem (1937) - First Mate
- The Great O'Malley (1937) - Convict at Lathe (uncredited)
- Midnight Court (1937) - 'Slim' Jacobs
- Way Out West (1937) - Sheriff
- The Hit Parade (1937) - Bedtime Story Man
- The Last Train from Madrid (1937) - Avila (uncredited)
- Three Legionnaires (1937) - Gen. Stavinski
- The Toast of New York (1937) - Top Sergeant
- Souls at Sea (1937) - Captain Paul M. Granley
- The Sheik Steps Out (1937) - Abu Saal
- All Over Town (1937) - Slug
- Wife, Doctor and Nurse (1937) - Delivery Man
- Danger – Love at Work (1937) - Thug
- Counsel for Crime (1937) - George Evans
- Ali Baba Goes to Town (1937) - Tramp
- Roll Along, Cowboy (1937) - Barry Barker
- Wells Fargo (1937) - Abe - Prospector
- Algiers (1938) - Carlos
- Of Human Hearts (1938) - Horse Owner (uncredited)
- Arsène Lupin Returns (1938) - André - Horse Groom (uncredited)
- The Adventures of Marco Polo (1938) - Bayan
- Wide Open Faces (1938) - Duke Temple
- Panamint's Bad Man (1938) - Harold 'Black Jack' Deavers
- Painted Desert (1938) - Bill
- Straight, Place and Show (1938) - Slippery Sol
- The Sisters (1938) - Ship's Captain (uncredited)
- Flirting with Fate (1938) - Fernando
- Off the Record (1939) - Big Bruiser (uncredited)
- Blackwell's Island (1939) - 'Bull' Bransom
- Chasing Danger (1939) - Captain Fontaine
- The Kid from Kokomo (1939) - Muscles Malone
- Exile Express (1939) - Tony Kassan
- Hell's Kitchen (1939) - Buck
- Fugitive at Large (1939) - Manning
- Pack Up Your Troubles (1939) - Sgt. Walker
- Viva Cisco Kid (1940) - Boss
- King of the Lumberjacks (1940) - Dominic Deribault
- Ski Patrol (1940) - Birger Simberg
- New Moon (1940) - Tambour
- Wyoming (1940) - Curley - Henchman (uncredited)
- The Great Plane Robbery (1940) - Frankie Toller
- Where Did You Get That Girl? (1941) - Crandall
- The Lady from Cheyenne (1941) - Jerry Stover
- I'll Sell My Life (1941) - Bochini (final film role)
