= Hollywood Round-Up =

1937 film

- Directed by: Ewing Scott
- Written by: Joseph Hoffman; Monroe Shaff; Ethel La Blanche
- Produced by: L.G. Leonard
- Starring: Buck Jones; Helen Twelvetrees; Grant Withers
- Cinematography: Allen Q. Thompson
- Edited by: Robert O. Crandall
- Music by: Morris Stoloff
- Production company: Columbia Pictures
- Distributed by: Columbia Pictures
- Release date: November 6, 1937
- Running time: 54 minutes
- Country: United States
- Language: English

Hollywood Round-Up is a 1937 American western film directed by Ewing Scott and starring Buck Jones, Helen Twelvetrees and Grant Withers. It was produced by Columbia Pictures.

== Cast ==
- Buck Jones as Buck Kennedy
- Helen Twelvetrees as Carol Stephens
- Grant Withers as Grant Drexel
- Shemp Howard as Oscar Bush
- Dickie Jones as Dickie Stephens
- Eddie Kane as Henry Wescott
- Monte Collins as Freddie Foster
- Warren Jackson as Director Perry King
- Lester Dorr as Louis Lawson
- Lee Shumway as Banker Dunning
- Edward Keane as Lew Wallace
- George Beranger as Hotel Clerk

== Bibliography ==
- Fetrow, Alan G. . Sound films, 1927-1939: a United States Filmography. McFarland, 1992.
- Pitts, Michael R. Western Movies: A Guide to 5,105 Feature Films. McFarland, 2012.
