= The Far Country (film) =

1954 film by Anthony Mann

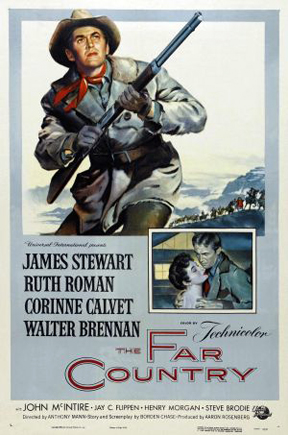
- Theatrical release poster by Reynold Brown
- Directed by: Anthony Mann
- Written by: Borden Chase
- Produced by: Aaron Rosenberg
- Starring: James Stewart; Ruth Roman; Corinne Calvet; Walter Brennan; John McIntire; Jay C. Flippen; Henry Morgan; Steve Brodie
- Cinematography: William H. Daniels
- Edited by: Russell F. Schoengarth
- Music by: Joseph Gershenson
- Production company: Universal Pictures
- Distributed by: Universal Pictures
- Release date: 22 July 1954 (London): February 12, 1955 (New York City)
- Running time: 97 minutes
- Country: United States
- Language: English
- Box office: $2.5 million (US)

The Far Country is a 1954 American Technicolor Western film directed by Anthony Mann and starring James Stewart, Ruth Roman, Walter Brennan, John McIntire and Corinne Calvet. Written by Borden Chase, the film is about a self-minded adventurer who locks horns with an evil, corrupt judge while driving cattle to Dawson, Yukon Territory. It is one of the few Westerns to be set in Alaska — others include The Spoilers (1955) and North to Alaska (1960) — although it was not filmed there. This was the fourth Western film collaboration between Anthony Mann and James Stewart. The supporting cast features Jay C. Flippen, Harry Morgan, Steve Brodie, Robert J. Wilke, Chubby Johnson, Royal Dano and Jack Elam.

== Plot ==
In 1896, Jeff Webster hears of the Klondike Gold Rush and he and friend Ben Tatem decide to drive a herd of cattle to Dawson City, Yukon. On the way, he annoys self-appointed Judge Gannon by interrupting a hanging in Skagway, so Gannon unilaterally confiscates his herd. After signing on to assist in taking supplies to Dawson, Jeff and Ben return to town to take the animals back to make them a part of the caravan, and they take off with Gannon and his men in hot pursuit. After crossing the border into Canada, Jeff uses a few well-placed warning shots to persuade Gannon's gang to give up the chase, but the judge promises to hang Jeff when he returns through Skagway.

When Jeff gets to Dawson, he finds a widespread benign lawlessness, and ignores it as none of his business. He auctions off his herd for $2 per pound on the hoof to new arrival Ronda Castle who had hired him, a saloon owner and one of Gannon's business associates, when she outbids Hominy, Grits and Molasses, co-owners of the local hash house. Both Ronda and French-Canadian gamine Renee Vallon are strongly attracted to Jeff. Now looking for their next adventure, Jeff and Ben use $40,000 of their proceeds to buy an existing gold claim, soon doubling their money.

Ronda sets up a saloon in partnership with Gannon, who begins cheating the miners out of their claims. Gannon and his gunmen show up to grab their share (and then some), making Dawson much more dangerous. Jeff stays out of it, instead planning to sneak out by river while Gannon is otherwise occupied. However, Gannon is tipped off when Ben buys extra coffee for the long trip; his men kill Ben and wound Jeff, finally forcing him to take sides.

Jeff calls Gannon out to settle the dispute man to man, but the villain arranges an ambush. Ronda rushes out to warn Jeff and is fatally shot in the back. Jeff kills Gannon in the ensuing gunfight and the rest of his gang agree to leave town, rather than fight all the fed-up longtime residents, who have finally found their courage and have armed themselves to directly face and resist the gang.

== Cast ==
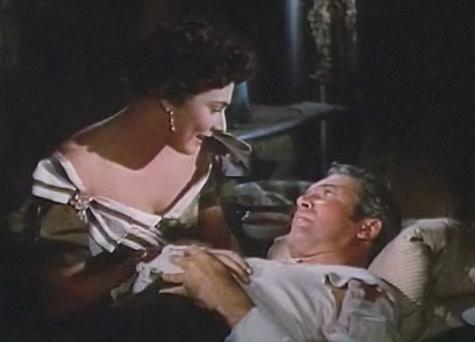
Ruth Roman and James Stewart

- James Stewart as Jeff Webster
- Ruth Roman as Ronda Castle
- Corinne Calvet as Renee Vallon
- Walter Brennan as Ben Tatem
- John McIntire as Judge Gannon
- Jay C. Flippen as Marshal Rube Morris
- Harry Morgan as Ketchum
- Steve Brodie as Ives
- Connie Gilchrist as Hominy
- Robert J. Wilke as Madden
- Chubby Johnson as Dusty
- Royal Dano as Luke
- Eugene Borden as Dr Vallon
- Jack Elam as Newberry
- Eddy Waller as Yukon Sam
- Kathleen Freeman as Grits
- Connie Van as Molasses

== Historical background ==
The character of Gannon may be loosely based on that of Soapy Smith, a confidence artist and gang leader who ran the town of Skagway during the Alaska Gold Rush. He was killed in a gunfight, although not as shown in the movie. The cattle were driven to Seattle, shipped to Skagway, and then driven further to Dawson, to total about 1,500 miles driven distance.

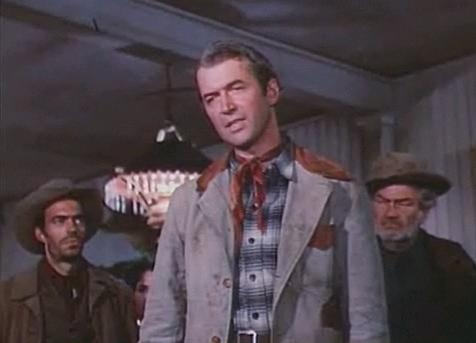
Jack Elam, James Stewart, and Jay C. Flippen

== Production ==
Filming locations

- Athabasca Glacier, Alberta, Canada
- Jasper National Park, Alberta, Canada

James Stewart had developed such a rapport with his horse "Pie" that he rode in 17 films including this. He was able to get the horse to do something at liberty all by himself when the trainer was not around. Shooting on this location, the horse needed to walk from one end of a street to another with no ropes on him or anything. Stewart went up to him and whispered in Pie's ear telling him what he needed him to do. And 'Pie' did it.

== Reception ==
The film was first released in the summer of 1954 throughout the UK, and was released in the US in February 1955. Stewart took a percentage of the profits. In 1955, William Goetz estimated that Stewart had earned $300,000 from the film.

== See also ==
- List of American films of 1954
