= Ethel La Blanche =

American screenwriter

- Born: Ethel LaPlanche; April 17, 1904; San Francisco, California, USA
- Died: April 28, 1992 (aged 88); Los Angeles, California, USA
- Occupation(s): Screenwriter, actress

Ethel La Blanche (April 17, 1904 – April 28, 1992) was an American screenwriter known for her work in the Western genre.

== Biography ==
Ethel was born in San Francisco, California, to Valentin LaPlanche and Katherine Riley. The family moved to Los Angeles when she was young.

She began working as a stenographer at a film studio in her teens, according to census records. She also dabbled in acting early on in her career, appearing in small roles in short Mack Sennett–produced films in the early 1930s. In her professional life, she went by the name Ethel La Blanche.

In the late 1930s and early 1940s, she wrote a string of B-movies, including Pirates on Horseback, Flirting with Fate, and Exile Express.

== Selected writing filmography ==
- Pirates on Horseback (1941)
- Exile Express (1939)
- Flirting with Fate (1938)
- Headin' East (1937)
- Hollywood Round-Up (1937) (dialogue)
- Man Hunters of the Caribbean (1936)
