= Ewing Scott =

American film director

Ewing Scott (1897–1971) was an American writer, producer and director. He specialized in films that involved location filming.

== Select credits ==
- Igloo (1932)
- Hollywood Round-Up (1937)
- Untamed Fury (1947)
- Harpoon (1948)
- Arctic Manhunt (1949)
