= University of the Pacific (United States) =

Private university in Stockton, California

- Former names: College of the Pacific (1911–1961); University of the Pacific (1852–1911); California Wesleyan College (1851)
- Type: Private university
- Established: July 10, 1851; 175 years ago
- Religious affiliation: United Methodist Church
- Academic affiliations: NAICU; IAMSCU
- Endowment: $643.2 million (2024)
- President: Christopher Callahan
- Faculty: 890 (2024)
- Administrative staff: 1,228 (2024)
- Students: 6,852 (2025)
- Undergraduates: 3,097 (2025)
- Postgraduates: 3,755 (2025)
- Other students: 1,628 (2024)
- Location: Sacramento, San Francisco, and Stockton, California, U.S. 37°58′46″N 121°18′45″W
- Campus: Urban, 175 acres (71 ha)
- Colors: Orange and black
- Nickname: Tigers
- Sporting affiliations: NCAA Division I – WCC
- Mascot: Powercat
- Website: pacific.edu

University of the Pacific (Pacific or UOP) is a private, historically Methodist-affiliated university with its main campus in Stockton, California, United States, and graduate campuses in San Francisco and Sacramento. It was the first university chartered in the state of California (1851), the first independent coeducational campus in California, and the first conservatory of music and first medical school on the West Coast.

Pacific was chartered on July 10, 1851, in Santa Clara, California, under the name California Wesleyan College. The school moved to San Jose in 1871 and then to Stockton in 1924. Pacific is accredited by the WASC Senior College and University Commission. In addition to its liberal arts college, Pacific has schools of business, dentistry, education, engineering, law, music, pharmacy, and health sciences.

The University's Holt-Atherton Special Collections and Archives is the home of the largest collections of the works of famed naturalist, conservationist, and "Father of the National Parks" John Muir. Pacific's William Knox Holt Memorial Library and Learning Center, houses a museum style space for Muir's papers. The Muir Experience has physical and digital exhibits to inspire user interaction with Muir's work.

== History ==
Pacific was founded on July 10, 1851, in Santa Clara. It was originally named California Wesleyan College, but one month later, it petitioned to have its name changed. It opened in 1852 under the name University of the Pacific. In 1858, the college opened the first medical school on the West Coast, the Medical Department of the University of the Pacific. The medical school was later affiliated with University College under the name Cooper Medical College, and in 1908 it was taken over by Stanford University and became the Stanford University School of Medicine. The University offered coeducational preparatory classes beginning in 1852, and college classes became coeducational in fall of 1870.

In 1871, the campus was moved to San Jose, to an area that came to be known as the College Park neighborhood, and opened its doors to women, becoming the first independent co-educational campus in California. In 1878, the Conservatory of Music was established at Pacific, making it the first of its kind west of the Mississippi River. In 1896, Napa College merged with the college. In 1911, the name was changed to College of the Pacific (COP).

In 1924, the campus relocated from the Bay Area to the city of Stockton becoming the first private four-year university in the Central Valley. In 1925, the San Jose campus was sold to Santa Clara College, which moved its Santa Clara Prep to the campus and renamed it Bellarmine College Preparatory.

The university expanded into graduate and professional education in the 1950s, establishing the School of Pharmacy in 1955 and the Graduate School in 1956. The School of Engineering was established in 1957. In 1961, the university resumed using the name University of the Pacific.

In 1962, Pacific merged with the San Francisco College of Physicians and Surgeons (established in 1896 in San Francisco), and then in 1966, with the McGeorge School of Law (established in 1924 in Sacramento).

In the late 1960s, when federal law surrounding funding of church-associated universities came into question, Pacific stopped receiving funding from the United Methodist Church. The university maintains its affiliation with the church while operating as a non-denominational school. Also in the 1960s, three new colleges were established that were modeled after British universities Oxford and Cambridge, integrating faculty and students into distinct living and learning communities: Raymond College (1962) was introduced as an accelerated, interdisciplinary liberal arts program in which students could shape their courses of study; Elbert Covell College (1963) was a unique inter-American college, with half its students from the U.S. and half from Latin America and classes taught in Spanish; and Callison College (1967) focused on non-western studies, giving students the opportunity to spend a year of their studies in Asia. These independent colleges merged with the rest of the university in 1982.

In 2013, the university received an estate gift of $125 million from Robert and Jeanette Powell. It is the largest gift in the university's history. This gift increased Pacific's endowment to $334 million. That same year, Pacific awarded its highest honor, the Order of Pacific, to the Powells.

In May 2019, the university's board of regents approved the School of Health Sciences, which launched in fall 2020 with four new graduate health care programs. The board also approved merging the Gladys L. Benerd School of Education with University College to form Benerd College, a new school focused on innovative educational programs with flexible pricing and delivery methods, including hybrid and online programs for working adults.

In May 2026, the university announced plans to open a school of medicine in 2030 to address the growing physician shortage across California's Central Valley.

== Campuses ==
=== Stockton ===
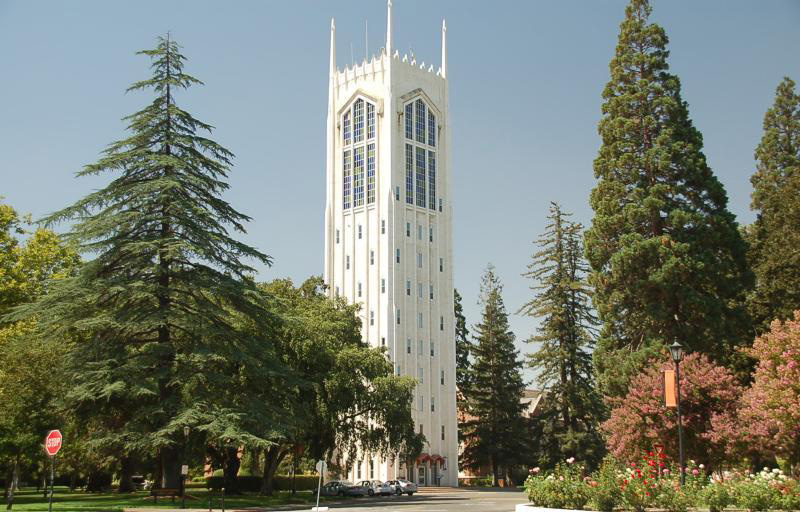
Burns Tower on the Stockton campus

The Stockton Campus is home to three main residential halls: Grace Covell Hall, Southwest Hall, and the Quad Buildings. The Quads are composed of several separate smaller residence halls in proximity to each other. Grace Covell is the largest residence hall on campus holding more than 350 students. Junior and seniors can find housing in the McCaffrey Center Apartments located in the center of campus, or in the three apartment buildings: Monagan Hall, Chan Family Hall, and Calaveras Hall, which is named after the Calaveras River that flows through the campus. There are also fraternity and sorority houses located on campus.

Because of its similarities to East Coast Ivy League universities, the Stockton Campus has been used in numerous Hollywood films. Its tower, rose gardens, architectural columns, brick-faced buildings, and numerous trees have variously been featured in: High Time, Raiders of the Lost Ark, Indiana Jones and the Kingdom of the Crystal Skull, The Sure Thing, Dead Man on Campus, All the King's Men, Flubber, and Dreamscape, among others. During June 2025, filming of the HBO comedy series Rooster took place at Pacific.

The university opened the LEED (Leadership in Energy and Environmental Design) Gold-certified John T. Chambers Technology Center, home of the university's School of Engineering and Computer Science, in 2010. Calaveras Hall, a new apartment-style residence hall, opened in 2018. In 2019, the university renovated the William Knox Holt Memorial Library.

The campus is home to Morris Chapel, a non-denominational church.

=== Sacramento ===
Pacific's 13-acre Sacramento Campus houses graduate and professional programs and a degree completion program in the Oak Park neighborhood, south of downtown. It consists of 26 buildings, including academic facilities, four residential facilities, and a fitness center/pool.

The campus includes the McGeorge School of Law, which is the only law school approved by the American Bar Association in Sacramento County. In 2015, Pacific began a transformation of its Sacramento Campus by adding graduate and professional programs. The campus now houses the School of Health Sciences, alongside McGeorge, with programs focused on law, health sciences, organizational leadership, and public policy. In 2025, the dental school's International Studies Program expanded to include the Sacramento Campus.

=== San Francisco ===
Pacific's San Francisco Campus is located in San Francisco's South of Market neighborhood, containing classrooms, administrative offices, a simulation laboratory and clinics offering dental care to the public through the Dugoni School of Dentistry. The San Francisco Campus also includes graduate programs in audiology and music therapy.

=== Campus sustainability ===
The university strives to promote environmental responsibility. Students are given opportunities to take part in sustainability service projects through the M.O.V.E. (Mountains, Ocean, Valley Experience) program. The on-campus dining services participates in the Farm to Fork Program, buying food locally where feasible. In 2009, students from the Residence for Earth and Environmental Living and Learning (a campus residential learning community), the Students for Environmental Action, and the Department of Earth and Environmental Sciences designed and implemented the "Tap That" campaign, whose goal was to inform students, faculty and staff about the effects of disposable water bottles on the environment.

The university opened several LEED-certified buildings, including the Don and Karen DeRosa University Center, the John T. Chambers Technology Center, and the Vereschagin Alumni House and has an interactive garden program on its Stockton and Sacramento campuses. In 2019, Pacific was ranked eighth for the sustainability of campus buildings by the Association for the Advancement of Sustainability in Higher Education. In 2021 and 2022, Pacific was ranked among the top 10 universities in the world for sustainable food and dining practices on college campuses.

Pacific installed solar panels over eight parking lots on the Stockton campus, which provide 30% of the campus's energy needs. The project, which was completed in April 2022, also involved the installation of 16 electric car ports in a partnership with Tesla.

== Organization and administration ==
On July 1, 2020, Christopher Callahan became the university's 26th president. Callahan was the founding dean of the Walter Cronkite School of Journalism and Mass Communication at Arizona State University.

== Academics ==
Pacific is accredited by the WASC Senior College and University Commission and offers more than 80 undergraduate areas of study, including 12 accelerated programs, more than 30 graduate and professional programs in 10 schools and colleges, and a continuing education program.

The university's nine schools and colleges are:

- Arthur A. Dugoni School of Dentistry: San Francisco
- Benerd College: Stockton, Sacramento, and San Francisco.
- College of the Pacific: The university's school of arts and sciences (liberal arts), Stockton
- Conservatory of Music: The first conservatory of music on the west coast, Stockton
- Eberhardt School of Business: Stockton
- McGeorge School of Law: Sacramento
- School of Engineering and Computer Science: Stockton
- School of Health Sciences: Sacramento
- Thomas J. Long School of Pharmacy: Stockton

=== Admissions ===
Undergraduate admission to University of the Pacific is rated as "more selective" by U.S. News & World Report. For fall 2025, Pacific received 8,656 freshmen applications; 5,977 were admitted (69%). The average GPA of enrolled freshmen was 3.61, while the average SAT score was 1316.

First-time freshmen profile
| | 2025 | 2024 | 2023 | 2021 | 2020 | 2019 | 2018 | 2017 |
|---|---|---|---|---|---|---|---|---|
| Freshman Applicants | 8,656 | 7,780 | 5,763 | 10,854 | 14,035 | 13,043 | 13,545 | 13,064 |
| Admits | 5,977 | 5,549 | 5,467 | 8,606 | 9,932 | 8,544 | 8,598 | 8,475 |
| % Admitted | 69.1 | 71.3 | 94.9 | 79.3 | 70.8 | 65.5 | 64.0 | 65.0 |
| Enrolled | 676 | 766 | 773 | 753 | 712 | 779 | 954 | 899 |
| % Yield | 11.3 | 13.8 | 14.1 | 8.7 | 7.2 | 9.1 | 11.1 | 10.6 |
| Median GPA | 3.61 | 3.62 | 3.63 | 3.82 | 3.84 | 3.60 | 3.54 | 3.52 |
| Median SAT | 1316 | 1311 | 1282 | 1247 | 1220 | 1240 | 1230 | 1198 |
(*SAT out of 1600)

=== Reputation and rankings ===
The 2025 U.S. News & World Report ranking of U.S. colleges and universities ranked University of the Pacific No. 139 in the "Top National Universities" category. The 2026 Wall Street Journal/Times Higher Education College Rankings ranked Pacific 85th. In 2022 the Georgetown University Center on Education and the Workforce ranked Pacific 39th in the U.S. in return on investment for low-income students.

== Student life ==
As of 2025, the Stockton Campus had 4,655 students (3,074 undergraduates, 1,088 graduate, 493 professional students). The San Francisco Campus had 664 students (19 undergraduates, 147 graduate, 498 professional students), and the Sacramento Campus had 1,533 students (4 undergraduate, 852 graduate, 677 professional students).

Undergraduate demographics as of Fall 2025
| Race and ethnicity | Total |
|---|---|
| Asian | 34% |
| Hispanic | 29% |
| White | 14% |
| Other (Note: Other consists of Multiracial Americans & those who prefer to not say.) | 13% |
| Foreign national | 7% |
| Black | 3% |
| Pacific Islander | 0% |
Economic diversity
| Low-income (Note: The percentage of students who received an income-based federal Pell grant intended for low-income students.) | 36% |

=== Student newspaper ===
The Pacifican is the university's student newspaper. It was founded in 1908, making it one of California's oldest continuously run student publications. In 2024, the student government voted to cut the $15,000 allocated for the paper from its budget.

=== Greek life ===
About 10% of students are members of a social fraternity or sorority at University of the Pacific, where there are three on-campus social fraternity houses and three on-campus social sorority houses. There are also a variety of multicultural and professional organizations.

== Athletics ==
Pacific had previously competed in the NCAA Division II California Collegiate Athletic Association conference but left in 1950. In 1952, Pacific became a charter member of the California Basketball Association, which soon became the West Coast Athletic Conference (WCAC) and is now the West Coast Conference (WCC). They remained in the WCAC until joining the Pacific Coast Athletic Association, now known as the Big West Conference, in 1969 for football and 1971 for other sports. Pacific dropped football after the 1995 season and returned to the WCC in 2013.

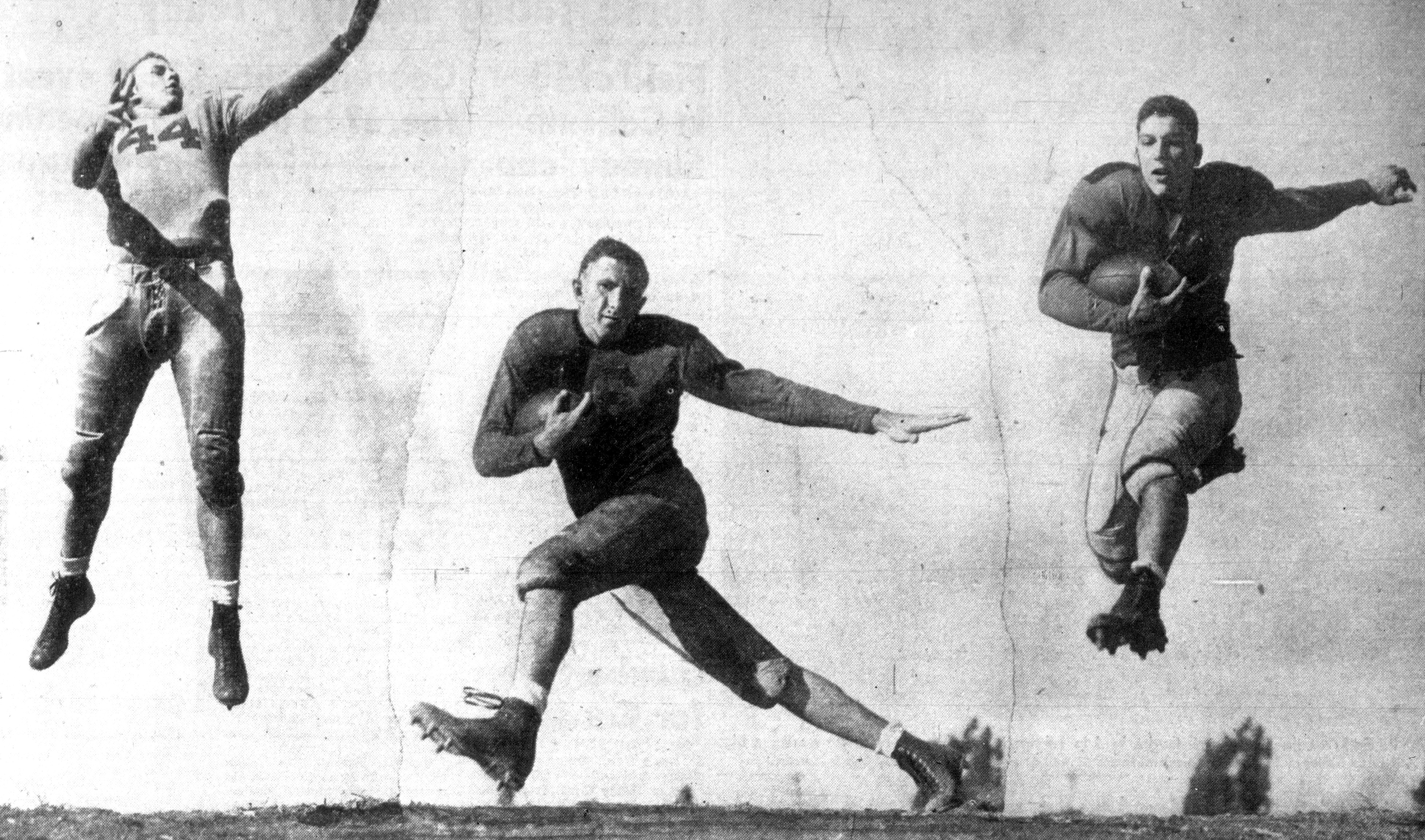
Tigers football players in 1943

Facilities on the Stockton Campus include the 2,500-seat Klein Family Field for baseball, the 350-seat Bill Simoni Field for softball, the 6,150-seat Alex G. Spanos Center for basketball and volleyball, Knoles Field for soccer, Chris Kjeldsen Pool and Pacific Aquatics Center for swimming and water polo, the Eve Zimmerman Tennis Center, and the Janssen-Lagorio Gymnasium and Performance Center.

University of the Pacific competes in NCAA Division I athletics as the Pacific Tigers in the West Coast Conference. After over 40 years of being in a conference (the PCAA/Big West) in which they were the only private school ever to have been a member, they returned to a league that is now composed exclusively of private, faith-based schools.

== Notable alumni ==
- Arif Alvi, MS 1984, 13th president of Pakistan (2018–2024)
- Rod Arrants, BA 1967, actor
- Thoren Bradley, BA and MA, social media influencer
- Scott Boras, PharmD 1977, JD 1982, sports agent
- Mary Ellen Bromfield, dancer
- Dave Brubeck, BM 1942, pianist and composer
- Connie Callahan, JD 1974, judge of the U.S. Court of Appeals for the Ninth Circuit
- Pete Carroll, BS 1973, college and professional football coach
- Jamie Lee Curtis, actress
- John Duarte, MBA 1989, farmer, nursery owner, and United States Congressman
- Tom Flores, 1958, football coach
- José Hernández, 1985, NASA astronaut
- Chris Isaak, BA 1981, musician and actor
- Nemir Kirdar, 1960, founder of Investcorp
- Eddie LeBaron, 1949, quarterback of the undefeated 1949 football team and player in the NFL
- Janet Leigh, 1947, actress, singer, dancer, and author
- Scott Liggett, musical composer
- Bridget Marquardt, MA 2001, model and actress
- George Moscone, 1953, California state senator and 37th mayor of San Francisco
- Theodore Olson, BA 1962, 42nd Solicitor General of the United States (2001–2004)
- Richard F. Pedersen, American diplomat and President of the American University in Cairo.
- Matt de la Peña, BA 1996, Newbery Medal-winning author
- Irene Roberts, 2006, opera singer
- Brad Schumacher, swimmer
- Robert D. Sharp, BA 1987, Vice Adm. (ret.), United States Navy, director National Geospatial-Intelligence Agency
- Alex Spanos, real estate developer, owner of the Los Angeles Chargers
- Chris Tamas, 2003, college volleyball coach
- Sem Verbeek, tennis player
- Robert M. Widney, 1862, lawyer and judge
- Amr Zedan, BS 1997, Saudi Arabian businessman and sportsman

== See also ==
- List of colleges and universities in California
