= Yankee Pasha (film) =

1954 film by Joseph Pevney

- Directed by: Joseph Pevney
- Screenplay by: Joseph Hoffman
- Based on: Yankee Pasha; 1947 novel by Edison Marshall
- Produced by: Howard Christie
- Starring: Jeff Chandler; Rhonda Fleming; Mamie Van Doren
- Cinematography: Carl Guthrie
- Edited by: Virgil Vogel
- Music by: Hans J. Salter
- Production company: Universal Pictures
- Distributed by: Universal Pictures
- Release date: April 17, 1954 (New York City)
- Running time: 84 minutes
- Country: United States
- Language: English
- Box office: $1,250,000

Yankee Pasha is a 1954 American romantic adventure film directed by Joseph Pevney and starring Jeff Chandler, Rhonda Fleming. and Mamie Van Doren. Shot in technicolor, it was produced and distributed by Hollywood studio Universal Pictures. The film is based on the 1947 novel Yankee Pasha by Edison Marshall.

== Plot ==
Fur trapper Jason Starbuck (Jeff Chandler) arrives in Salem, Massachusetts in 1800. A general store owner challenges him to a horse race, but his rider's fiancée, Roxana Reil, gives a helpful tip to Starbuck on how to win the race.

A romantic attraction develops and Roxana's father advises her not to marry a man she does not love. Roxana sets sail for France, however, and her boat is attacked by pirates, who kill her father and take Roxana captive in Morocco, making her a slave. Starbuck pursues her. He is introduced by a U.S. consul to the sultan, who is impressed with Starbuck's rifle marksmanship. He is offered a position with the sultan's infantry and given a slave of his own, Lilith.

Roxana has been sold to Omar Id-Din, who could be plotting against the sultan. Starbuck challenges Omar to a duel, with the winner acquiring the other's rifle and slave. Starbuck wins and intends to return home with Roxana, but they are betrayed by the jealous Lilith, who fights Roxana and tells Omar of their plans.

Starbuck is taken prisoner. Lilith has a change of heart, however, and changes clothes with Roxana to fool the guards. With the help of Hassan Sendar, one of the sultan's soldiers, they help rescue Starbuck, who leads the escape of other prisoners. He throws Omar from a roof. He and Roxana are free, and, as a reward, Hassan is given a new slave, Lilith.

== Cast ==
- Jeff Chandler as Jason Starbuck
- Rhonda Fleming as Roxana Reil
- Mamie Van Doren as Lilith, Harem Slave
- Lee J. Cobb as Sultan
- Bart Roberts as Omar Id-Din
- Hal March as Hassan Sendar
- Tudor Owen as Elias Derby
- Arthur Space as Richard O'Brien
- Benny Rubin as Zimil
- Phil Van Zandt as Baidu Sa'id
- Harry Lauter as Dick Bailey
- John Day as First mate Miller
- Christiane Martel as Harem Girl
- Myrna Hansen as Harem Girl
- Kinuko Ito as Harem Girl
- Emita Arosemena as Harem Girl
- Synove Gulbrandsen as Harem Girl
- Alicia Ibanez as Harem Girl
- Ingrid Mills as Harem Girl
- Maxine Morgan as Harem Girl
- Mara Corday as Harem Girl
- Lisa Gaye as Harem Girl
- Marla English as Harem Girl
- Rosalind Hayes as Eliza

== Production ==
The novel was a best seller and Universal bought the film rights as a vehicle for Jeff Chandler. Chandler recorded the song I Should Care on Brunswick Records from the film.
