= Untamed Fury =

1947 film

- Directed by: Ewing Scott
- Written by: Taylor Caven; Paul Gerard Smith; Ewing Scott
- Produced by: Ewing Scott
- Starring: Steve Pendleton; Mikel Conrad; Leigh Whipper
- Cinematography: Ernest Miller
- Edited by: Robert O. Crandall
- Music by: Alexander Laszlo
- Production company: Danches Brothers Productions
- Distributed by: Producers Releasing Corporation
- Release date: March 22, 1947
- Running time: 60 minutes
- Country: United States
- Language: English

Untamed Fury (also known as The Outlander) is a 1947 American adventure film directed by Ewing Scott and starring Steve Pendleton, Mikel Conrad and Leigh Whipper. It was distributed by Producers Releasing Corporation.

== Cast ==
- Steve Pendleton as Jeff Owens
- Mikel Conrad as 'Gator-Bait' Blair
- Leigh Whipper as Uncle Gabe
- Mary Conwell as Judy Blair
- Althea Murphy as Patricia 'Pat' Wayburn
- Jack Rutherford as Nubie Blair
- Charles Keane as Rufe Owens
- Rodman Bruce as Lige
- Paul Savage as Swamper
- E.G. Marshall as Pompano, The Dance Caller
- Norman McKayas Bradbury, the writer

== Production ==
The film was financed by the Danches brothers, industrialists who had made a fortune during World War II and wanted to enter into filmmaking. The film's budget was $165,000.
