= Edison Marshall =

American writer (1894–1967)

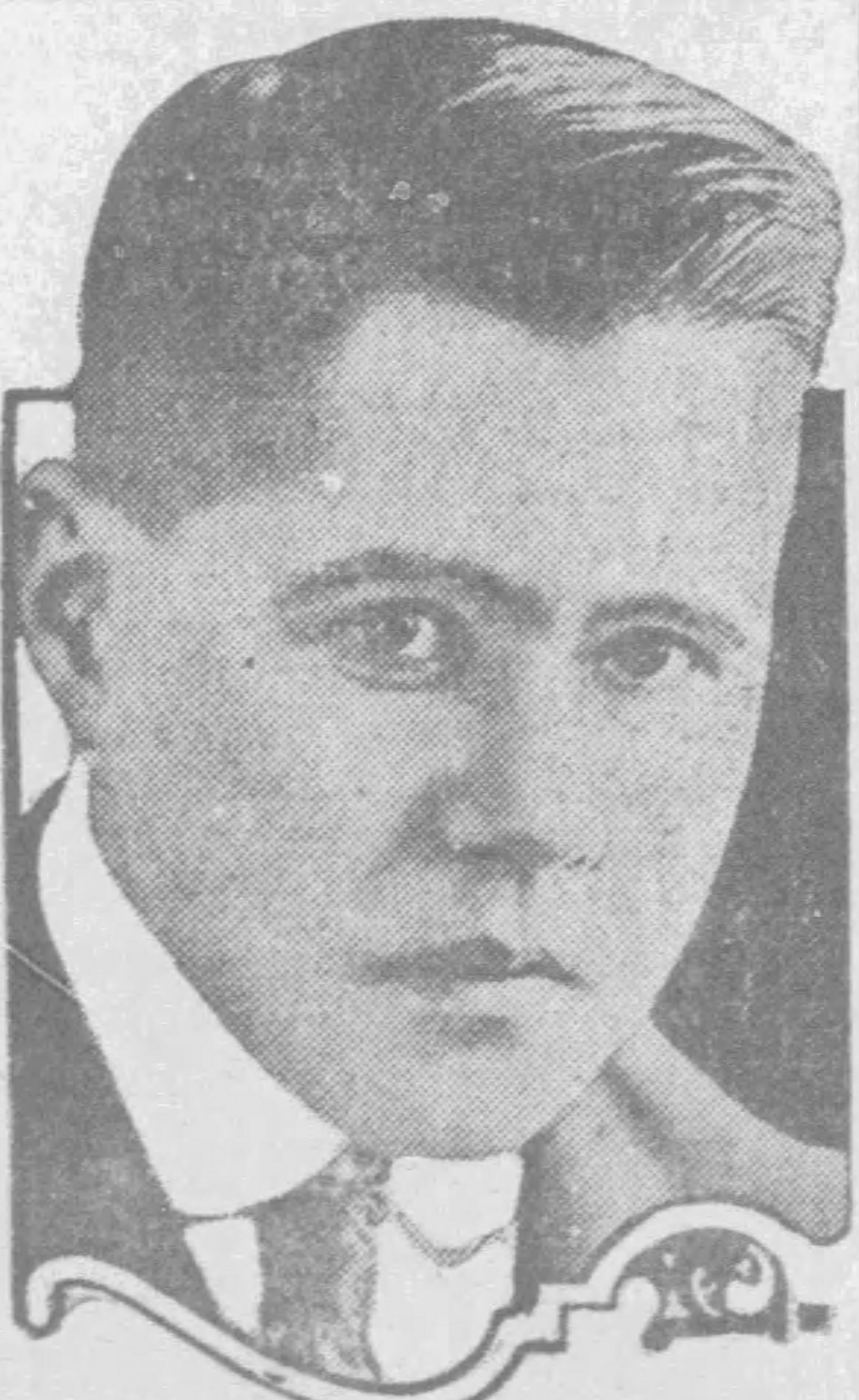
- Marshall in 1920
- Born: Edison Tesla Marshall; August 28, 1894; Rensselaer, Indiana, U.S.
- Died: October 29, 1967 (aged 73); Augusta, Georgia, U.S.
- Education: University of Oregon
- Occupations: Short story writer; novelist
- Spouse: Agnes Sharp Flythe
- Children: 2
- Writing career
- Pen name: Hall Hunter
- Genres: Historical fiction; science fiction
- Notable awards: O. Henry Award (1921)

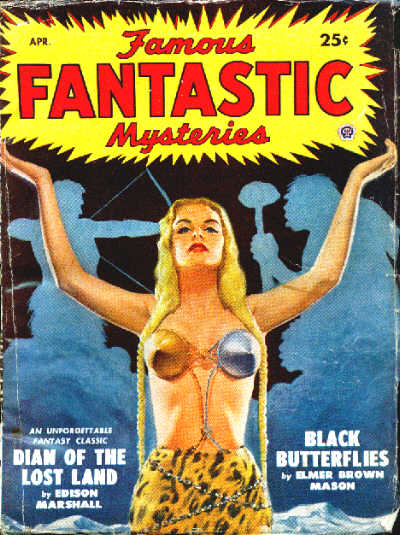
Marshall's 1923 novel Dian of the Lost Land was reprinted as the cover story for the April 1949 issue of Famous Fantastic Mysteries

Edison Tesla Marshall (August 28, 1894 – October 29, 1967) was an American author of short stories and novels.

== Life ==
Marshall was born on August 28, 1894, in Rensselaer, Indiana. He grew up in Medford, Oregon, and attended the University of Oregon from 1913 to 1916. He served in the U.S. Army with the rank of second lieutenant. His 1917 World War I draft registration card indicated he was a "professional writer" employed by The American Magazine and The Saturday Evening Post, and that he was missing his thumb on his left hand. He married Agnes Sharp Flythe; they had two children, Edison and Nancy. In 1926, they moved to Augusta, Georgia. Marshall mainly wrote historical fiction. He also wrote some science fiction about lost civilizations.

For some of his work, he used the pseudonym Hall Hunter.

His novel Benjamin Blake was adapted into a movie in 1942, Son of Fury, featuring Tyrone Power. Yankee Pasha-The Adventures of Jason Starbuck was adapted into the movie Yankee Pasha, featuring Jeff Chandler and Mamie Van Doren in 1954, as was The Vikings, featuring Kirk Douglas, in 1958.

He had a Gold Cross, Order of Merit from the University of Miami.

A life-long hunter, he stalked big game in Canada, Alaska, Africa, Indo-China, and India. He described his hunting experiences in The Heart of the Hunter, copyrighted in 1956. (A high school hunting accident cost him his thumb).

He died on October 29, 1967, in Augusta, Georgia.

== Awards ==
- 1921 O. Henry Award

== Works ==
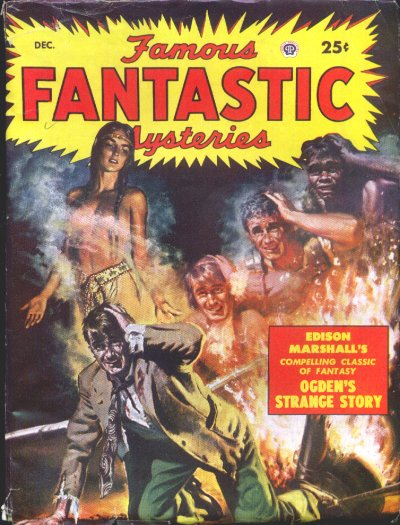
Marshall's 1934 novel Ogden's Strange Story was reprinted as the cover story on the December 1949 issue of Famous Fantastic Mysteries

- The Voice of the Pack. Little, Brown, and Company. 1920.
- The Snowshoe Trail. A. L. Burt. 1921.
- The Strength of the Pines. Little, Brown. 1921. (reprinted 1950 as Trail's End, Popular Library)
- Shepherds of the Wild . Little, Brown and Company. 1922. (reprinted 1950 as Riders of the Smoky Land)
- The Skyline of Spruce. Little, Brown, and Company. 1922.
- The Land of Forgotten Men. A. L. Burt. 1923. (reprinted 1972 as The Lost Land)
- Seward's Folly. Little, Brown and Company. 1924.
- Love Stories of India. Farrar, Straus. 1933.
- Ogden's Strange Story. H. C. Kinsey & Company, Inc. 1934.
- Dian of the Lost Land. H. C. Kinsey & Company, Inc. 1935.
- The Stolen God. Philadelphia Inquirer Public Ledger. 1937.
- The Doctor of Lonesome River. Triangle Books. 1938.
- The Jewel of Mahabar. H. C. Kinsey & Company, Inc. 1938.
- Benjamin Blake. Farrar, Straus. 1941.
- Great Smith. Farrar & Rinehart. 1943.
- Yankee Pasha-The Adventures of Jason Starbuck. Farrar, Straus. 1947.
- Gypsy Sixpence. Farrar, Straus. 1949.
- The Upstart. Dell. 1950.
- The Infinite Woman. Farrar, Straus. 1950.
- Castle in the Swamp: A Tale of Old Carolina. Farrar, Straus. 1948.
- The Viking. Farrar, Straus, and Young. 1951.
- Caravan to Xanadu: a Novel of Marco Polo. Farrar, Straus and Young. 1951.
- Bengal Tiger: a Tale of India. Doubleday. 1952.
- American Captain. Farrar, Straus & Young. 1954.
- The Gentleman. Farrar, Straus & Cudahy. 1956.
- The Pagan King. Doubleday. 1959.
- Earth Giant. Doubleday. 1960.
- West with the Vikings. Doubleday. 1961.
- The Conqueror. Doubleday. 1962.
- Cortez and Marina. Doubleday. 1963.
- The Lost Colony. Doubleday. 1964.

He had also worked on Parole, Inc. (1948), a film noir, as a dialog director.

=== Stories ===
- "The Heart of Little Shikara". O. Henry memorial award prize stories. Doubleday. 1922.
- William Harris Elson; Christine M. Keck, eds. (1922). "The Elephant Remembers". Junior high school literature. Scott, Foresman and Co.
