= Yankee Pasha (novel) =

1947 novel by Edison Marshall

- First edition
- Author: Edison Marshall
- Language: English
- Publisher: Farrar, Straus
- Publication date: October 21, 1947
- Publication place: United States
- Media type: Print (hardback and paperback)
- Pages: 375 (first edition, hardback)

Yankee Pasha: The Adventures of Jason Starbuck is a historical novel written by Edison Marshall and published in 1947.

Yankee Pasha is probably Marshall's best-known work and one of the most popular. It was produced in seven different editions with many separate printings between 1947 and 1975 in the U.S.A. and Europe. Upon initial publication, the book received positive reviews including that of Fletcher Pratt, the American writer particularly noted for his works on naval history, that appeared in the December 6, 1947 issue of the Saturday Review.

As in most of the novels of Edison Marshall, readers informed about local history and names can see references to his past life in Oregon in Yankee Pasha.

One of the paperback covers of the book was realized by the American realist artist James Bama and another one was made by famous paperback book cover artist Robert Stanley.

The book was made into a film in 1954, Yankee Pasha, starring Jeff Chandler and Rhonda Fleming, and featuring Mamie Van Doren. It was released by Universal Pictures.
