= Arctic Manhunt =

1949 film

- Directed by: Ewing Scott
- Written by: Oscar Brodney; Joel Malone
- Based on: "Narana of the North" by Ewing Scott
- Produced by: Leonard Goldstein; William Grady Jr. (as Billy Grady Jr.)
- Starring: Mikel Conrad; Carol Thurston; Wally Cassell
- Cinematography: Irving Glassberg; Kay Norton
- Edited by: Otto Ludwig
- Production company: Universal Pictures
- Distributed by: Universal Pictures
- Release date: September 24, 1949
- Running time: 60 minutes
- Country: United States
- Language: English
- Budget: $215,000

Arctic Manhunt is a 1949 American adventure film directed by Ewing Scott and starring Mikel Conrad, Carol Thurston and Wally Cassell.

== Plot ==
Insurance agents head to the icy wilderness to collect an ex-con in possession of $250,000 in stolen funds.

== Cast ==
- Mikel Conrad as Mike Jarvis
- Carol Thurston as Narana
- Wally Cassell as Tooyuk

== Production ==
60% of the film was shot on location in the Arctic over a four-month period.
