= Ankush Kumar Bahl =

- Born: San Francisco, CA
- Occupation: Conductor
- Formerly of: Omaha Symphony Orchestra
- Award: Grammy
- Website: www.ankushbahl.com

Ankush Kumar Bahl is a Grammy-nominated Conductor and music director. He has won the Solti Foundation U.S. Career Assistance Award numerous times (2011, 2013, 2015, 2016).

== Early life and education ==
Kumar Bahl was raised in the San Francisco Bay Area. He is of Indian descent. Kumar Bahl received a double degree in music and rhetoric from the University of California at Berkeley. In 2003, he received a master's degree in Orchestral Conducting from the Manhattan School of Music, where he studied with Zdenek Macal, David Gilbert, and George Manahan.

== Career ==
In 2005, Bahl made his debut at Carnegie Hall as assistant conductor during the New York Youth Symphony's 42nd season, conducting Brahms's "Tragic Overture."

Bahl was mentored by Kurt Masur, in collaboration with the Manhattan School of Music. Under Masur, Bahl was Assistant Conductor at Leipzig Gewandhaus Orchestra, Orchestre National de France, and the Leipzig Gewandhaus Orchestra. In addition to Masur, Bahl includes Maestros Jaap van Zweden, Zdenek Macal, David Zinman, and Gianandrea Noseda among his mentors.

From 2011 to 2015, Bahl was the Assistant Conductor of the National Symphony Orchestra in Washington, D.C under Christoph Eschenbach. In 2013, he made his debut at the NSO's summer series, Wolf Trap. In 2014, Bahl stepped in when Guest Conductor Rafael Frühbeck de Burgos fell ill.

Bahl co-founded Everything Conducting, a free online platform offering educational resources developed alongside fellow conductors John Devlin, Anna Edwards, and Enrico Lopez-Yañez in 2020.

In 2021, Bahl joined Omaha Symphony as music director.

In 2022, Bahl was Guest Conductor at Oakland Symphony, leading the orchestra through Hector Berlioz's “Symphonie fantastique."

In 2024, Bahl and the Omaha Symphony were nominated for a Grammy at the 66th Annual Awards in the Best Classical Compendium category for Sculptures, composed by Andy Akiho.

Bahl has been Guest Conductor at The Kennedy Center, Hong Kong Philharmonic Orchestra, Richmond Symphony, Detroit Symphony Orchestra, Amsterdam's Royal Concertgebouw Orchestra, The Chelsea Symphony, Sacramento Philharmonic Orchestra, the Juilliard School, Jackson Symphony Orchestra, Buffalo Philharmonic Orchestra, London Symphonia.

== Personal ==
Kumar Bahl is married. He and his wife, Ritu Shrotriya, are parents to twin sons.
