= Bear Valley Music Festival =

Annual music festival in California, US

The Bear Valley Music Festival is an American classical music festival that takes place in the High Sierra ski village of Bear Valley, Alpine County, California. Held since 1967, the festival takes place over three weekends in late July to early August. The festival features, symphonic, chamber, opera, rock, country and pops concerts.

== History ==
Initially known as Music From Bear Valley, the Bear Valley Music Festival was founded in 1967 by conductor John Gosling. Gosling, who at the time was the music director of the Monterey Symphony, spent summer vacations with his family in Bear Valley. The initial festival concerts were performed in the Bear Valley Lodge on August 23 and 24,1968. Gosling recruited musicians from the San Francisco Bay Area for the first season's "surprisingly good" chamber orchestra. By 1970, the festival had grown to a seven day, three concert event. Among the first musicians attracted to the festival was noted violinist, Stephan Krayk who served as concertmaster of the festival orchestra for ten years. Krayk helped shape the festival orchestra in its early years. In the mid-1970s, the festival began setting up what was eventually referred to as the “Big White Tent" in a parking lot between Creekside Drive and the granite rocks (where some festival goers can listen to the music for free).

By 1982, the festival had expanded from a single weekend with a chamber orchestra into a two week festival, that stretched over three weekends, featuring a full symphony orchestra. In 1982, Gosling was succeeded by Carter Nice, then music director of the Sacramento Symphony. Under Nice's leadership, the quality of the orchestra improved as the festival attracted musicians from around the country. Nice expanded the stature and diversity of artists appearing with the festival to include, among others, Joshua Bell, Glen Campbell, Glenn Dicterow, Jeffry Kahane, Ronald Leonard, Ramsey Lewis and Ursula Oppens. Noted personalities such as Lloyd Bridges and Robert Conrad also appeared with the festival orchestra, and the repertoire grew to include large symphonic works and full opera productions. Maestro Nice invited pianist Olga Kern to perform at the festival in August 2001, shortly after hearing her gold medal winning performance at the Van Cliburn International Piano Competition in 2001.

After 27 years, Carter Nice retired as Music Director of the festival in 2013. He was succeeded by Michael Morgan, then music director of the Oakland Symphony, and the Sacramento Philharmonic. Known for "...making classical music accessible and fun," Morgan's first season featured an eclectic repertoire that included chamber music, jazz, Broadway tunes, movies, and a concert that featured Vadym Kholodenko, winner of the fourteenth Van Cliburn International Piano Competition. During his nine years as music director, Morgan's practice of innovative programming mixed with traditional classics introduced Bear Valley Music Festival audiences to a spectrum of artists and music, e.g., jazz artist Mads Tolling, a commissioned work by composer David Conte, and performances of works of rarely performed composers such as Florence Beatrice Price. Maestro Morgan's final public performances were with the festival orchestra at the Bear Valley Music Festival, on August 1, 2021.

In 2022, Alexander Mickelthwate, music director of the Oklahoma City Philharmonic, was named music director of the Bear Valley Music Festival. Only the fourth music director in the festival's over half-century history, Mickelthwate counts Morgan as an early mentor in his conducting career. Known for growing audiences, community outreach and "artistic scope", Maestro Mickelthwate has continued Morgan's legacy of innovative programming. During the first three years of his tenure, he has programmed contemporary works by such composers as Mason Bates, Jarod Impichchaachaaha Tate and Eric Whiteacre while still programming traditional symphonic works. He has collaborated with musicians and composers with the San Francisco Conservatory of Music, Stanford University's Jazz Workshop and San Francisco's Community Music Center. Under Mickelthwate's leadership, the festival orchestra continues to draw musicians from across the country.

== Music directors ==
- John Gosling, Founder 1967-1985
- Carter Nice 1985-2012
- Michael Morgan 2013-2021
- Alexander Mickelthwate 2022-

== Opera conductors ==
- Thomas Conlin
- Carter Nice
