= John Devlin (conductor) =

- Occupation: Conductor at Wheeling Symphony Orchestra
- Instrument: Clarinet
- Spouse: Camille Cintrón Devlin (married 2015-present)
- Website: johndevlinmusic.com

John Gennaro Devlin is an American orchestral conductor and music director. He has been the music director of the Wheeling Symphony Orchestra in West Virginia since 2019, and is concurrently serving as the Music Director of the Lancaster Festival Orchestra in Ohio, a position he began in 2025.

== Early life and education ==
Devlin went to Emory University. Devlin began conducting and served as the Assistant Conductor of the Emory Youth Symphony Orchestra from 2006-2008.

Devlin graduated Summa cum Laude from Emory, with dual Bachelor of Arts degrees in Clarinet Performance and Latin in 2008 and was inducted into the Phi Beta Kappa Honor Society. Devlin earned his Master of Music degree in Orchestral Conducting from the University of Maryland School of Music in 2011, as well as his Doctor of Musical Arts in Orchestral Conducting in 2015, studying under James Ross.

== Clarinet performance ==
In fourth grade, Devlin began studying clarinet with Dorothy Duncan in Bronxville, New York. At age 16, he joined the Festival Orchestra at Hoff-Barthelson in Scarsdale, New York. In 2003 and 2004, he participated in the Clarinet Workshop and the Young Artists Wind Ensemble at Boston University, Tanglewood Institute. Devlin was also a member of the New York Youth Symphony Orchestra from 2003-2004.

At Emory University, Devlin participated in the Chamber Music Program (woodwind quintet), and served as co-principal clarinet of the Emory University Orchestra and of the Emory University Wind Ensemble.

== Career ==
In 2014, Devlin co-founded Gourmet Symphony, a non-profit organization whose mission was to reimagine the classical music experience by pairing it with fine food and drink. In 2017, violinist Joshua Bell performed with the National Symphony Orchestra, in an event that Devlin conducted, curated by Gourmet Symphony at the Ronald Reagan building in Washington, D.C. That same year, Devlin delivered his first TED Talk at TEDxTysons, titled "Innovation In A Crowded Marketplace."

Devlin joined the Princeton Symphony Orchestra as Assistant Conductor to Music Director Rossen Milanov in 2015. Also in 2015, Devlin became the Cover Conductor at the National Symphony Orchestra in Washington, D.C. Over his three-year tenure, Devlin was Cover Conductor for Music Directors Christoph Eschenbach and Gianandrea Noseda, plus Guest Conductors Donald Runnicles, Leonard Slatkin, Edward Gardner, James Conlon, Marek Janowski, Gustavo Gimeno, Ton Koopman, and Edo de Waart.

In 2019, Devlin was appointed the Music Director of the Wheeling Symphony Orchestra (WSO), becoming the ninth conductor in its 90-year history. Under Devlin’s leadership, the WSO received the 2022 West Virginia Governor’s Award for Resiliency in the Arts and the Virginia B. Toulmin Foundation Award in both 2023 and 2025.

Devlin co-founded Everything Conducting, a free online platform offering educational resources developed alongside fellow conductors Ankush Kumar Bahl, Anna Edwards, and Enrico Lopez-Yañez in 2020. Devlin co-hosts the podcast UpBeat from Everything Conducting with Enrico Lopez-Yañez, which launched the same year.

In 2025, Devlin began his tenure as Music Director of the Lancaster Festival Orchestra in Ohio, which supports and celebrates artistic growth and performance in classical music.

== Guest conducting ==
Since 2013, Devlin has guest conducted at the following orchestras: National Symphony Orchestra, Utah Symphony, Rochester Philharmonic Orchestra, Louisville Orchestra, Sarasota Orchestra, North Carolina Symphony, Colorado Springs Philharmonic, Virginia Symphony Orchestra, Hawai’i Symphony Orchestra, Columbus Symphony, Omaha Symphony, Princeton Symphony Orchestra, Kalamazoo Symphony Orchestra, Greenville Symphony Orchestra, Allentown Symphony Orchestra, York Symphony Orchestra, Alexandria Symphony Orchestra, Wintergreen Festival Orchestra, Elgin Symphony Orchestra, and the American Repertory Ballet.

== Collaborations and commissions ==
Devlin has collaborated with artists from myriad disciplines such as Yo-Yo Ma, Joshua Bell, Time for Three, Chris Thile, Sasha Cooke, Clarice Assad, Stefan Jackiw, Tessa Lark, Shara Nova, Xavier Foley, Eunice Kim, Third Coast Percussion, Soloman Howard, Madeline Adkins, Tracy Silverman, and Maxim Lando.

Devlin has also collaborated with Broadway stars such as Sutton Foster, Renée Elise Goldsberry, Sierra Boggess, Hugh Panaro, Scarlett Strallen, Capathia Jenkins, Ryan Shaw, and Morgan James. He has also conducted live orchestral performances accompanying films such as the Harry Potter series, Jurassic Park, and other cinematic projects.

In 2013, Devlin commissioned and conducted the world premiere of La Saulaie, a semi-finished work of Claude Debussy that was later completed by Robert Orledge. Devlin has also commissioned and premiered works from composers such as Adolphus Hailstork, Leanna Primiani, Clarice Assad, Daniel Bernard Romain, Eric Nathan, Arlene Sierra, Michael Foumai, and Quinn Mason.

== Awards and honors ==
- Georg Solti Foundation Career Assistance Award (2023)
- Mayor's Award for Distinguished Service, Loyalty, and Dedication to the City of Wheeling (2023)
- West Virginia Governor’s Arts Award (2022)
- University of Maryland All-STAR Award and Distinguished Teaching Assistant Award
- Robert W. Woodruff Scholarship (2007)
- Beinecke Scholar (2007)
- Phi Beta Kappa Honor Society (2006)

== Personal ==
Devlin has been married to Camille Cintrón Devlin since 2015.
