= Paramount Theatre (Oakland, California) =

Concert hall in Oakland, California

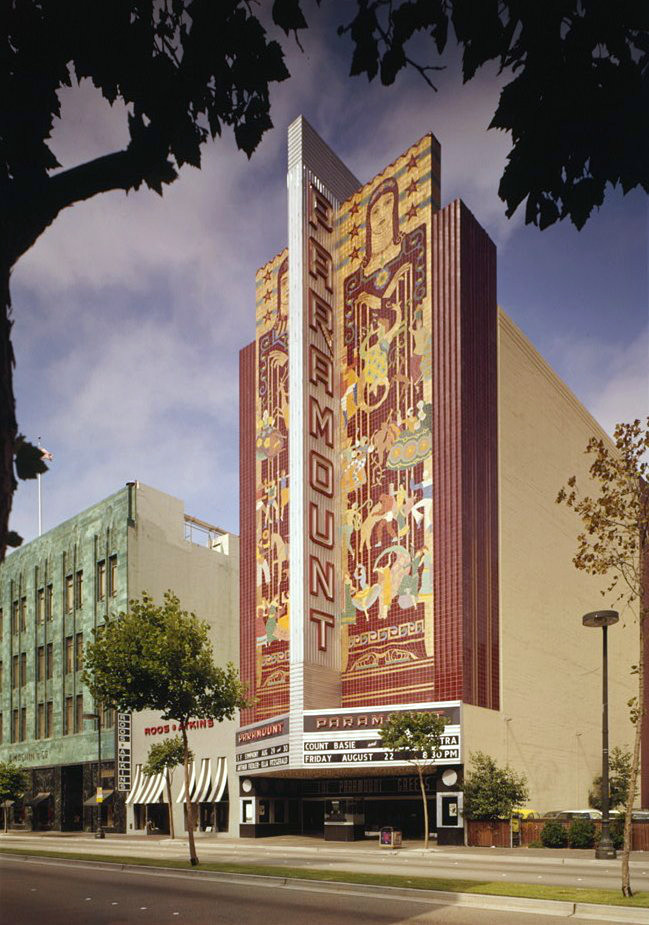
- Interactive map of Paramount Theatre
- Location: 2025 Broadway; Oakland, California, USA
- Coordinates: 37°48′34″N 122°16′05″W
- Owner: City of Oakland; Nonprofit
- Seating type: Orchestra, balcony
- Capacity: 3,040
- Type: Indoor theater
- Public transit: 19th Street

Construction
- Opened: 1931
- Renovated: 1973

Website
- www.paramounttheatre.com
- Paramount Theatre
- U.S. National Register of Historic Places
- U.S. National Historic Landmark
- California Historical Landmark
- Oakland Designated Landmark
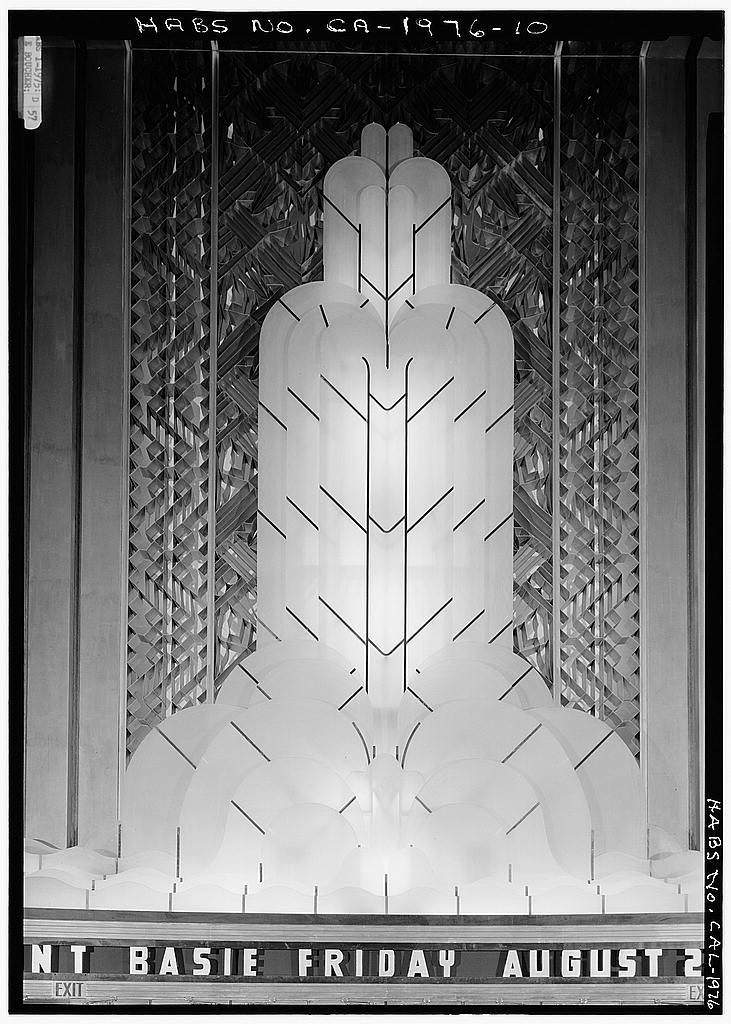
- Grand Lobby interior, Fountain of Light over entrance and marquee

- Location within Oakland, California
- Location: Oakland, California
- Coordinates: 37°48′36″N 122°16′4″W
- Area: less than one acre
- Built: 1931
- Architect: Timothy Pflueger
- Architectural style: Art Deco
- NRHP reference No.: 73000395
- CHISL No.: 884
- ODL No.: 9

Significant dates
- Added to NRHP: August 14, 1973
- Designated NHL: May 5, 1977
- Designated CHISL: 1975
- Designated ODL: 1975

The Paramount Theatre is a 3,040-seat Art Deco concert hall located at 2025 Broadway in Downtown Oakland. When it was built in 1931, it was the largest multi-purpose theater on the West Coast, seating 3,476. Today, the Paramount is the home of the Oakland Symphony and the Oakland Ballet. It regularly plays host to R&B, jazz, blues, pop, rock, gospel, classical music, as well as ballets, plays, stand-up comedy, lecture series, special events, and screenings of classic movies from Hollywood's Golden Era.

== History ==
The Paramount Theatre was built as a movie palace, during the rise of the motion picture industry in the late 1920s. In 1925, Adolph Zukor's Paramount Publix Corporation, the theater division of Paramount Pictures, one of the great studio-theater chains, began a construction program resulting in some of the finest theaters built. Publix assigned the design of the Oakland Paramount to 38-year-old San Francisco architect Timothy L. Pflueger (1892–1946) of Miller and Pflueger. The Paramount opened at a cost of $3 million on December 16, 1931. Pflueger was also the designer of the Castro Theatre in San Francisco. The Art Deco design referred to the 1925 Exposition Internationale des Arts Décoratifs et Industriels Modernes in Paris. The term Art Deco has been used only since the late 1960s, when there was a revival of interest in the art and fashion of the early 20th century.

The Paramount organ was built by Wurlitzer for the Paramount Publix theaters: a four-manual, twenty-rank model called the Publix I (Opus 2164), which cost $20,000 in 1931.

The gala premiere on December 16, 1931, was attended by Kay Francis, star of the opening film, The False Madonna, and cast members Conway Tearle, Charles D. Brown, Marjorie Gateson, and William Boyd (not yet known as Hopalong Cassidy). Notable guests included California's governor James Rolph and Oakland mayor Fred N. Morcom. Tickets were first-come, first-served: sixty cents for the balcony seat and eighty-five cents for a seat in the orchestra. The program also included a Fox Movietone News newsreel, a Silly Symphony animated cartoon The Spider and the Fly, and the music of the Paramount's own 16-piece house orchestra, under the direction of Lew Kosloff. Last on the program was the stage show Fanchon & Marco's "Slavique Idea", a forty-minute revue featuring Sam Hearn, comedians Brock and Thompson, dancer LaVonne Sweet, the acrobatic Seven Arconis, Patsy Marr, and the Sunkist Beauties in a chorus-line finale.

In June 1932 the Paramount closed, unable to meet operating expenses of more than $27,000 per week. Competing with Paramount was the Fox Oakland Theater, which had opened in 1928. The Paramount stayed closed for nearly a year. The days when movie theaters could support not just the showing of movies, but entire orchestras, stage shows, and uniformed attendants, were over, just as the Paramount was being completed. When it reopened in May 1933, it was under the management of Frank Burhans, the manager of the Warfield Theatre in San Francisco. He was commissioned to get the Paramount out of debt, and his method for achieving this was to operate without either a stage show or an orchestra, and to unscrew light bulbs in an effort to reduce energy expenses. The Paramount showed the best of the new motion pictures, including such features as Dancing Lady (1933) with Joan Crawford and Clark Gable, Dames (1934) with Dick Powell, and The Gay Divorcee (1934) with Fred Astaire and Ginger Rogers. The Great Depression gave way to World War II, and the Port of Oakland became a major departure and arrival point for servicemen. The Paramount's comfortable chairs and spacious lounges were a favorite gathering place. In the 1950s, popcorn machines and candy counters were installed, and on the lobby walls the incandescent lights were taken out and replaced by neon tubing in red and blue. In 1953, it played the first CinemaScope movie The Robe with Richard Burton and Jean Simmons. The 1957 Elvis Presley's Jailhouse Rock attracted a thousand young people. At the end of the 1950s theaters were losing patrons to television, but the Paramount management responded with talent shows, prize nights, and advertising campaigns.

For a second time the Paramount closed on September 15, 1970, because it no longer was able to compete with smaller movie theaters in the suburbs. The Paramount's last film was Let It Be (1970) with The Beatles. In 1971, a Warner Bros. movie, The Candidate, starring Robert Redford, was filmed using the interior of the Paramount as one of the principal locations.

Hope surfaced in October 1972 when the Oakland Symphony Orchestra Association (OSO), in need of a new home, purchased the Paramount for $1 million, half of which was donated by the seller, National General Theaters—formerly the Fox Theaters-West Coast—with the other half coming from generous private donors. The popcorn machines and candy counters were removed. With the help of restoration project manager Peter Botto, new, wider seats were installed, the distance between rows was increased to provide more leg room, and a replica of the original carpet was laid throughout the theater. Two bars, one on the mezzanine and one on the lower level, and a new box office were added. Skidmore, Owings & Merrill were consultants for the restoration, with Milton Pflueger & Associates assisting. The Paramount reopened on September 22, 1973, in its original 1931 splendor. Following the Opening the Oakland Symphony had sold out nearly all seats on subscription sales and sold out a majority of individual concerts.

But even with the house full the Paramount Theatre proved a financial burden to the Oakland Symphony. In addition the Oakland Symphony financed renovation costs with a $1 million loan. Rather than continue absorbing the Paramount's operating losses, the Oakland Symphony transferred the Paramount to the City of Oakland in 1975 for $1 in exchange for 40 years of free rent. They continued with that agreement until the Oakland Symphony Orchestra filed for Chapter 7 bankruptcy in September 1986.

Seeing an opportunity, a group of seven private citizens banded together and approached city officials with the idea of managing and operating the Paramount on behalf of the city as a nonprofit organization. They agreed, and the management structure has remained to this day.

Walking into the main lobby, with its gold ornamentation along the walls, curving staircase, and glowing light fixtures, is like taking a trip back through Old Hollywood. Public tours of the Paramount Theatre are given on the first and third Saturdays of each month, excluding holidays and holiday weekends. Documented in 1972 by the Historic American Buildings Survey, the theater was entered into the National Register of Historic Places on August 14, 1973, and became a California Registered Historical Landmark in 1976 and a U.S. National Historical Landmark in 1977.

=== Photo gallery ===
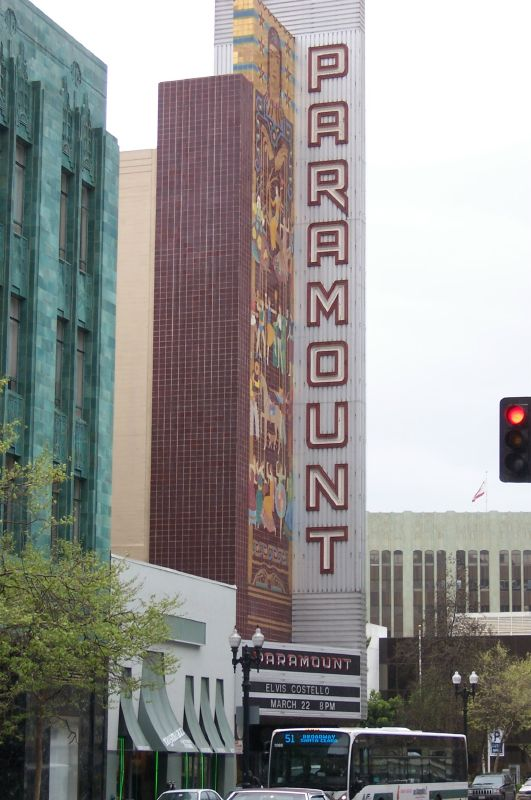
2005 view of marquee listing Elvis Costello

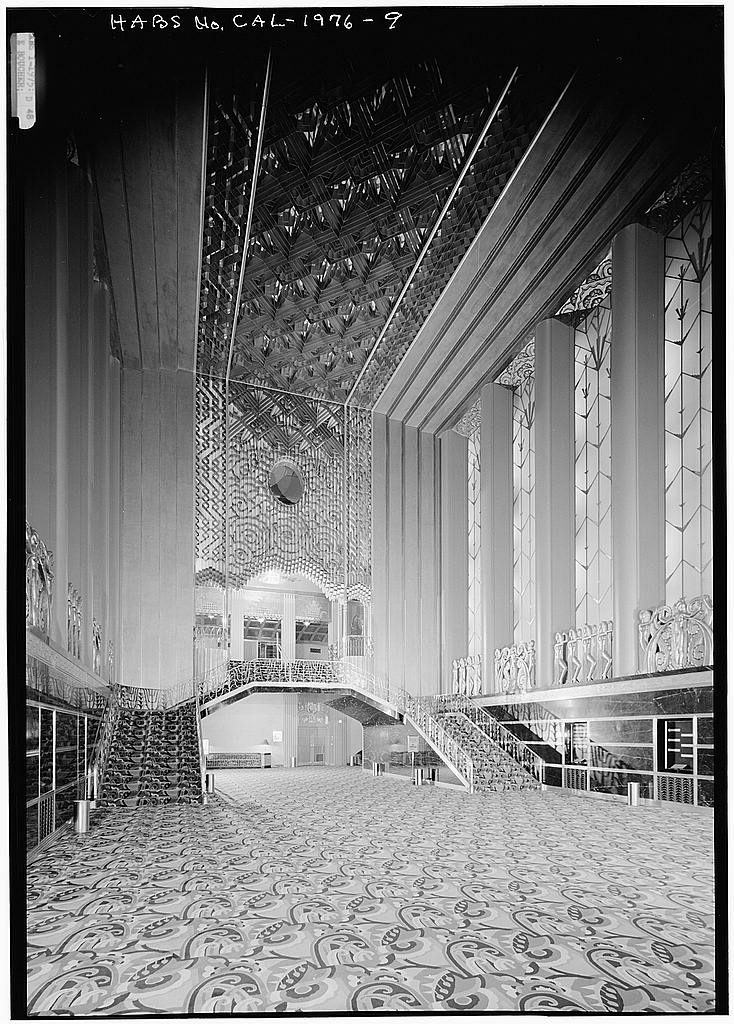
1975 photograph by Jack E. Boucher showing the four-story Grand Lobby

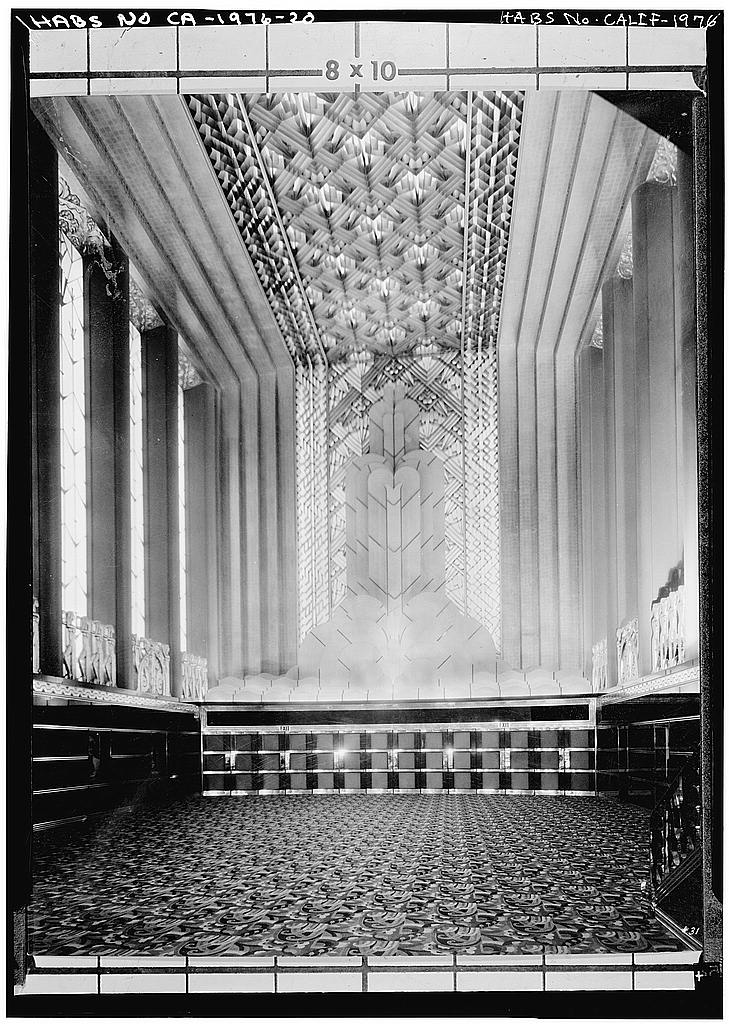
Fountain of Light over seven double doors at entrance

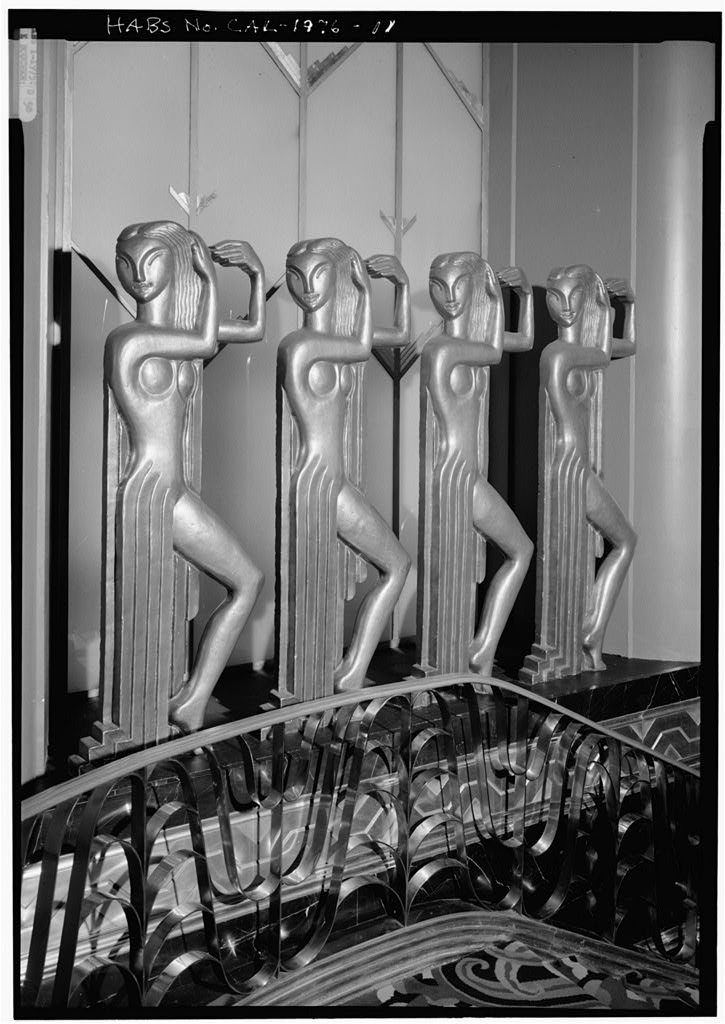
Grand Lobby north wall showing dancing figures

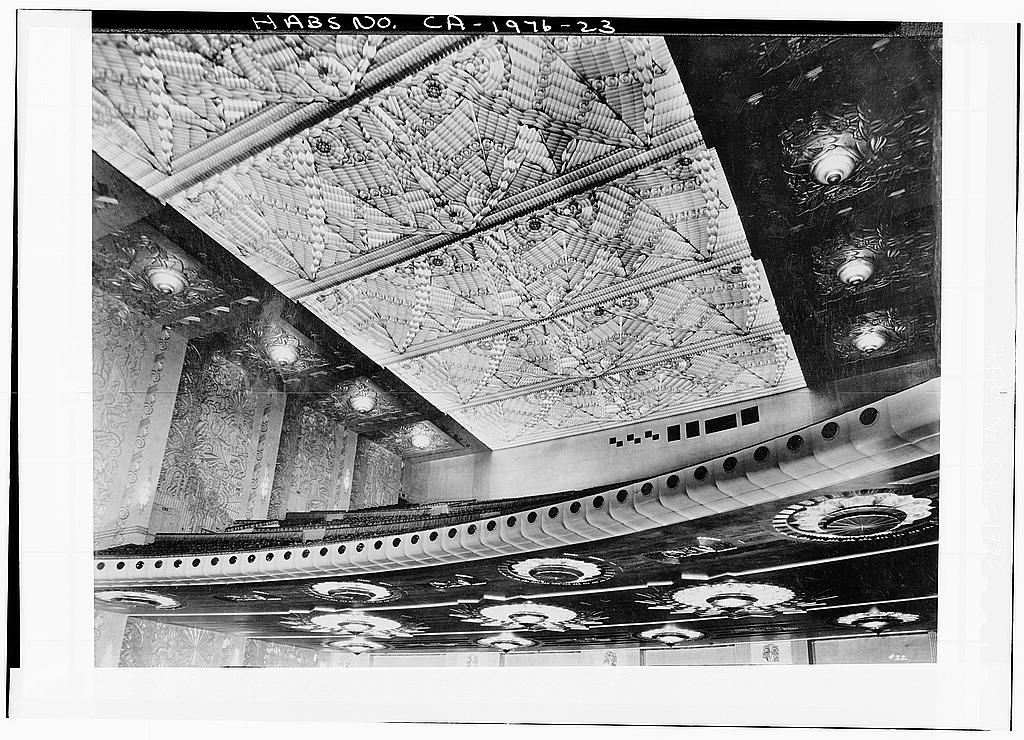
1932 image of auditorium ceiling and balcony soffit. Round holes in balcony edge are for stage lighting instruments. Dark windows in far wall are for film projectors and spotlights.

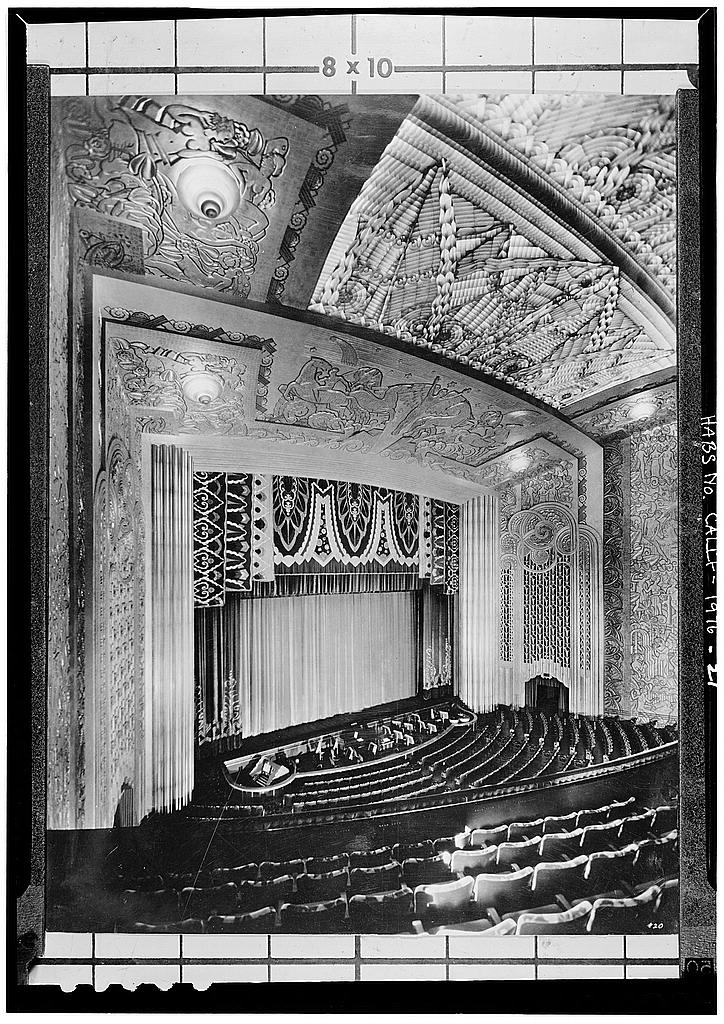
1932 view looking down from the balcony at the ceiling, proscenium, curtain, seating and hydraulic orchestra pit

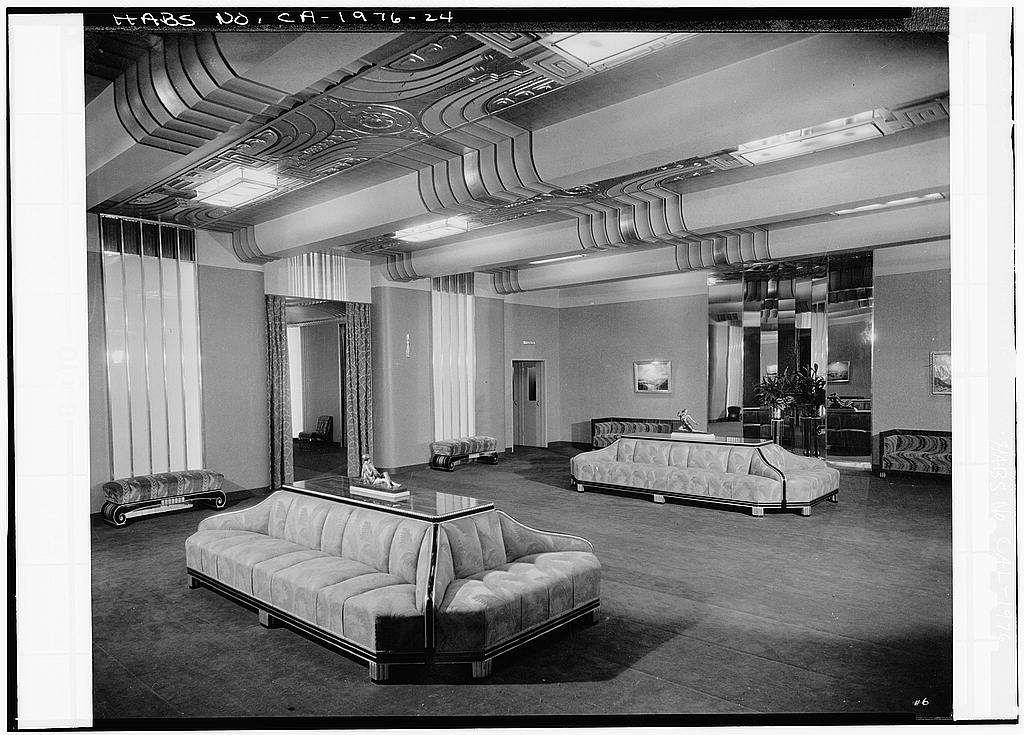
Basement lounge showing stylized couches and benches. Note the bold wall and ceiling designs

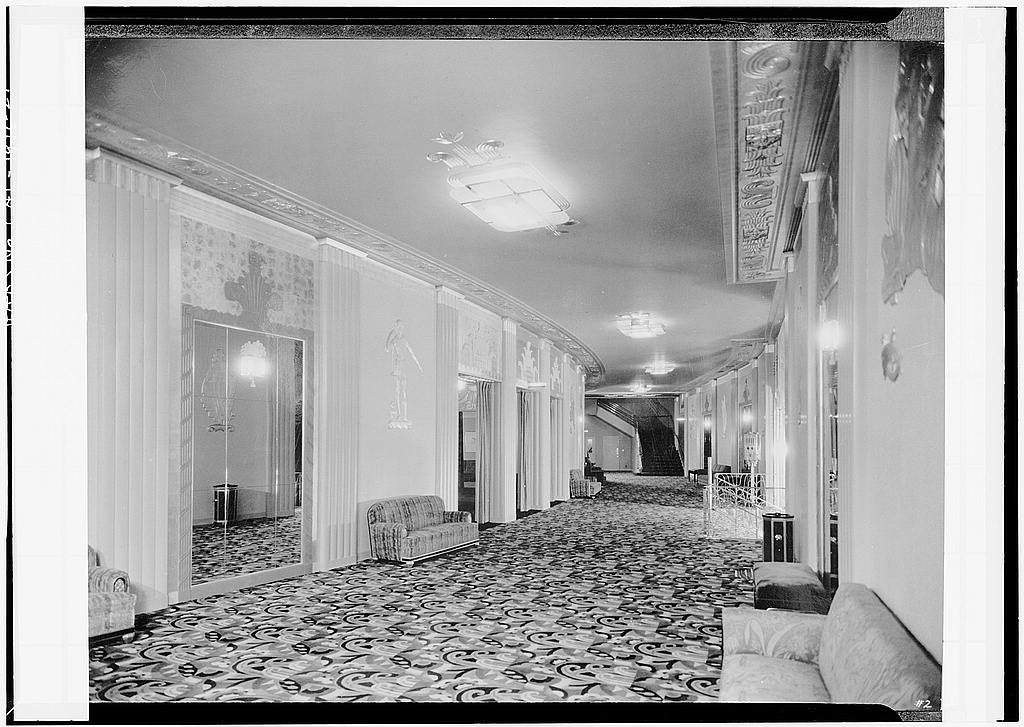
Mezzanine-level foyer

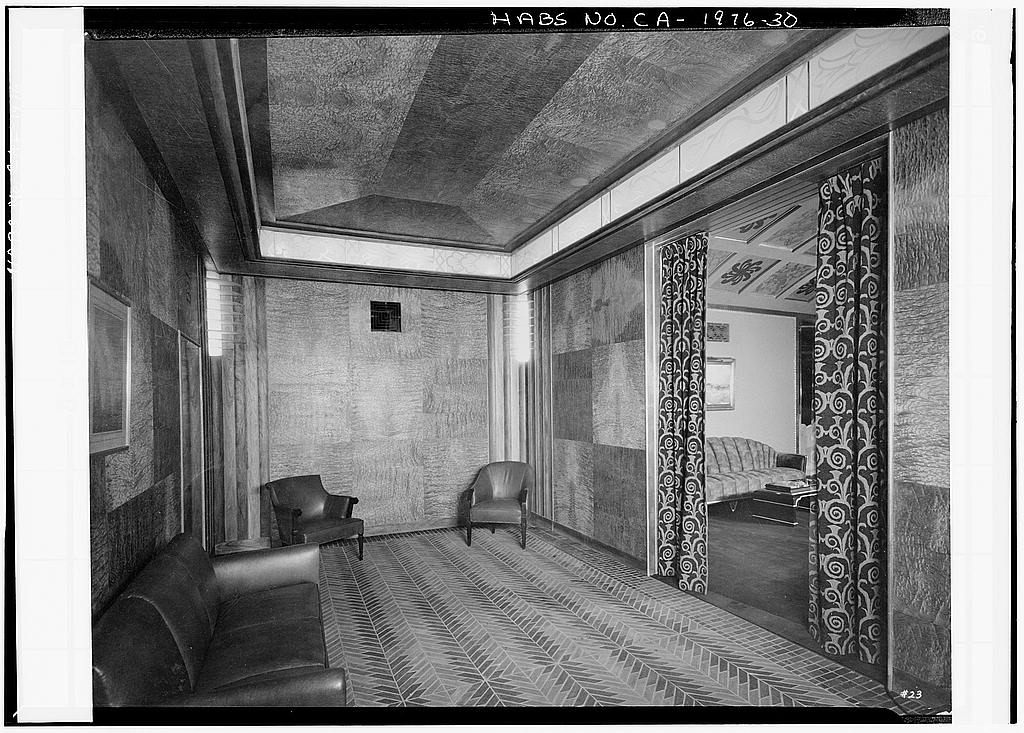
Men's lounge, mezzanine level

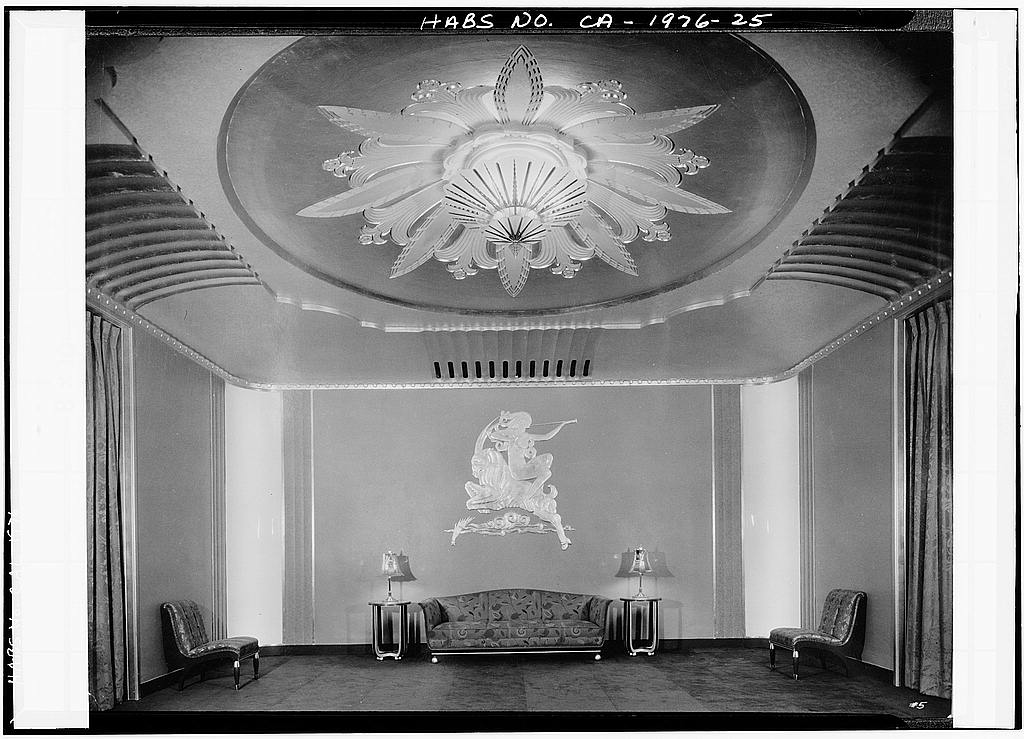
Women's lounge, basement level

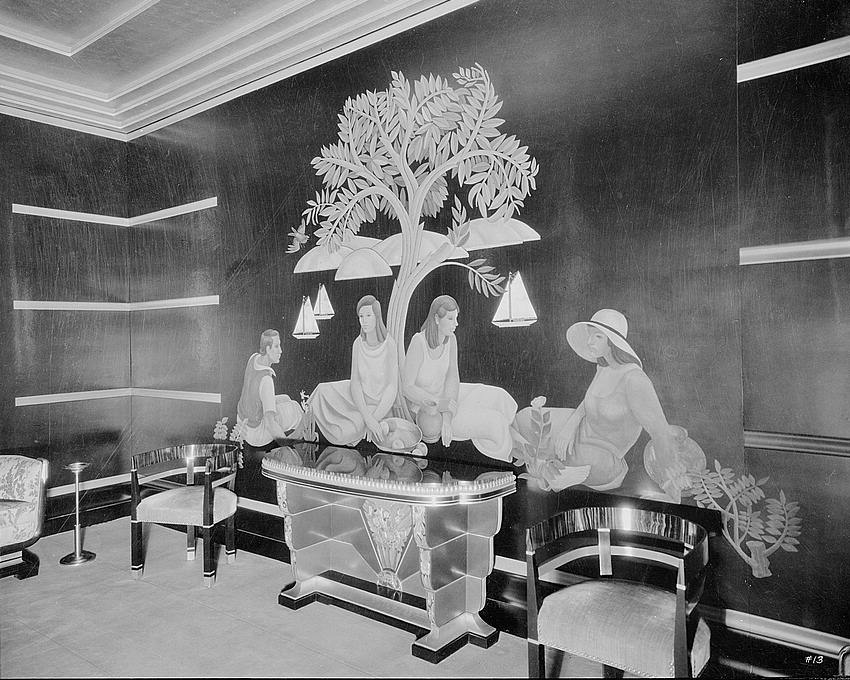
Women's Smoking Room, basement level

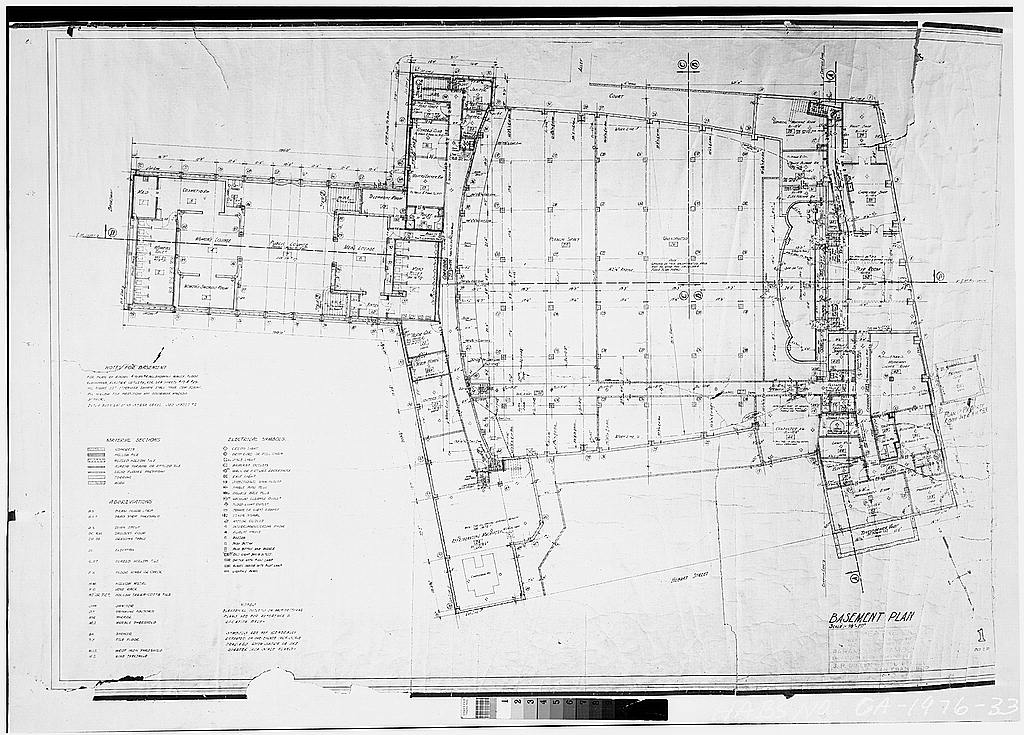
Architect's basement plan

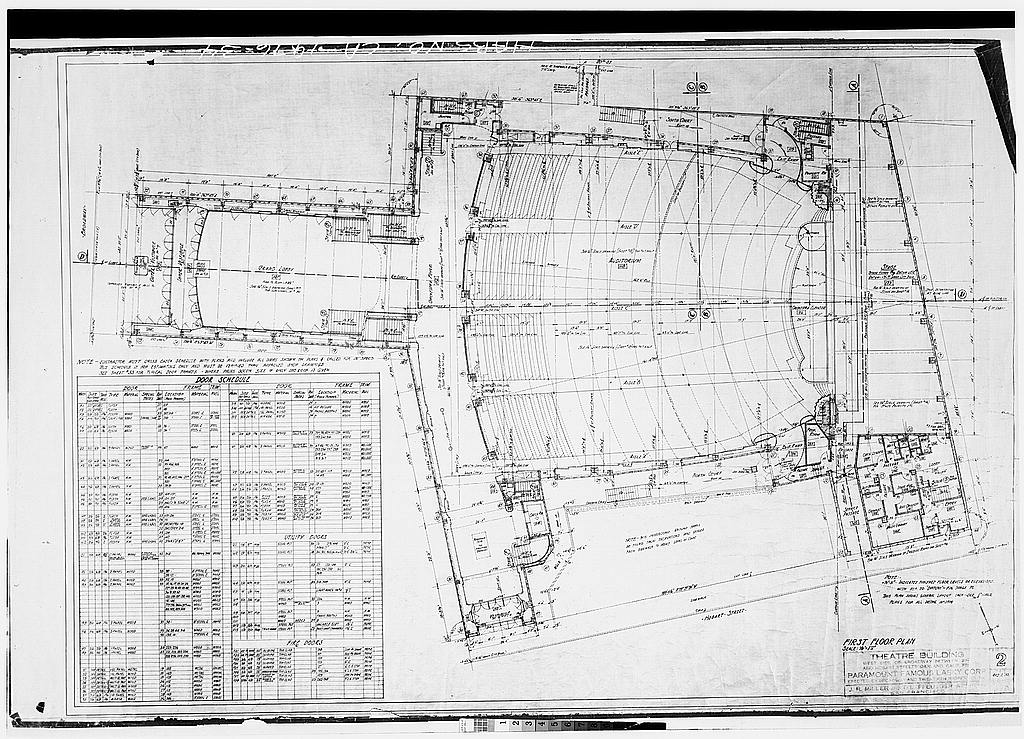
Architect's first floor plan

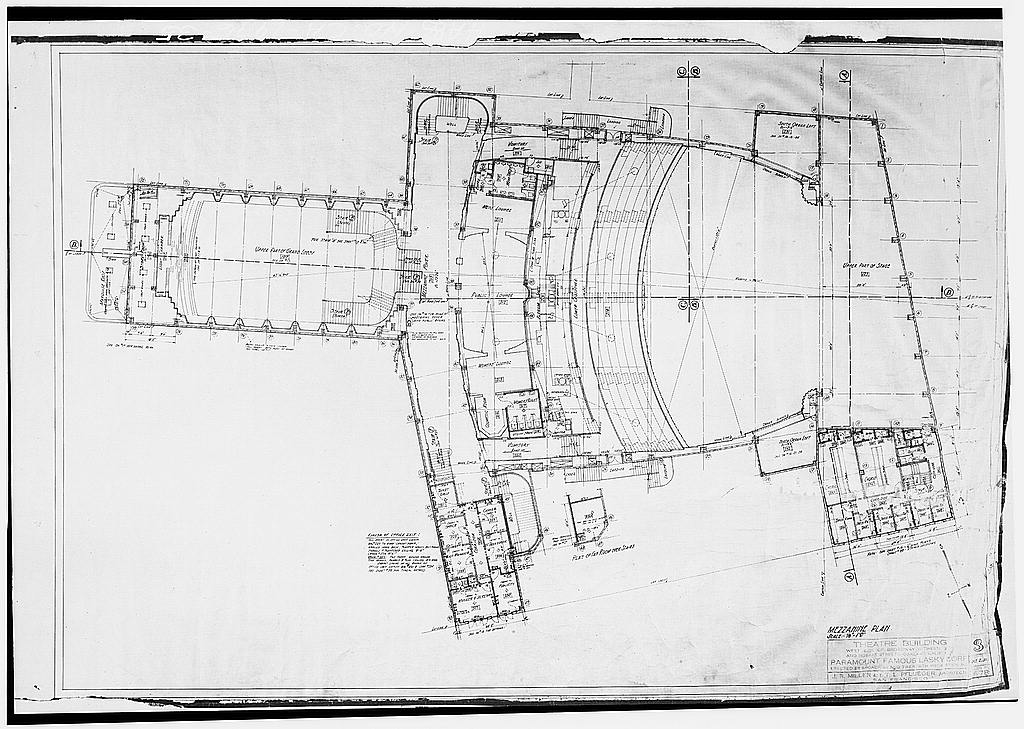
Architect's mezzanine plan

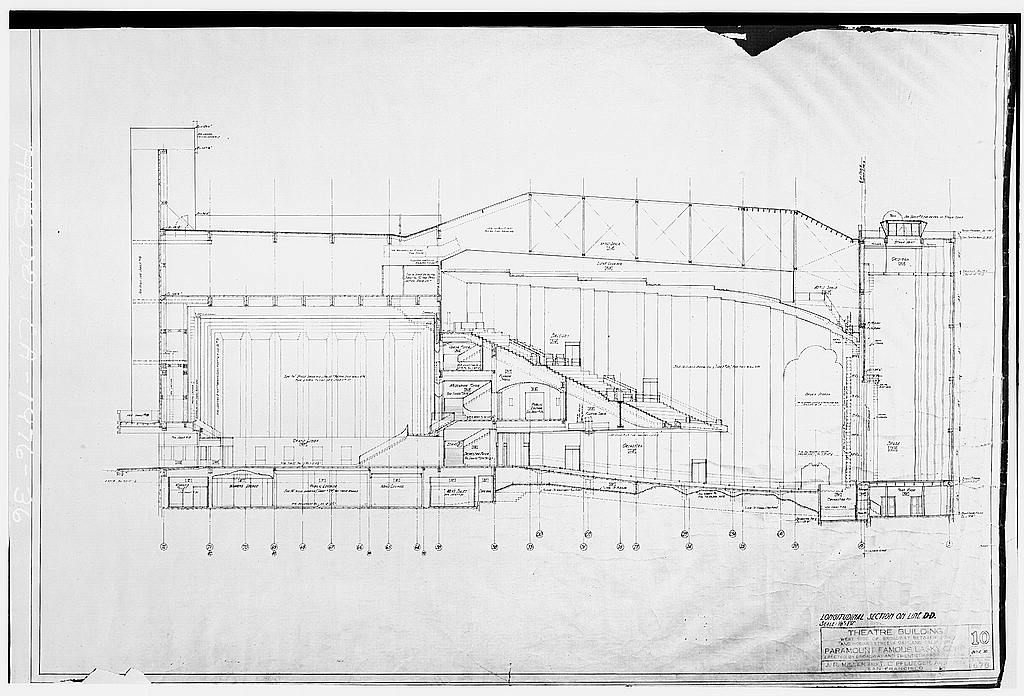
Architect's longitudinal section (cutaway side view)

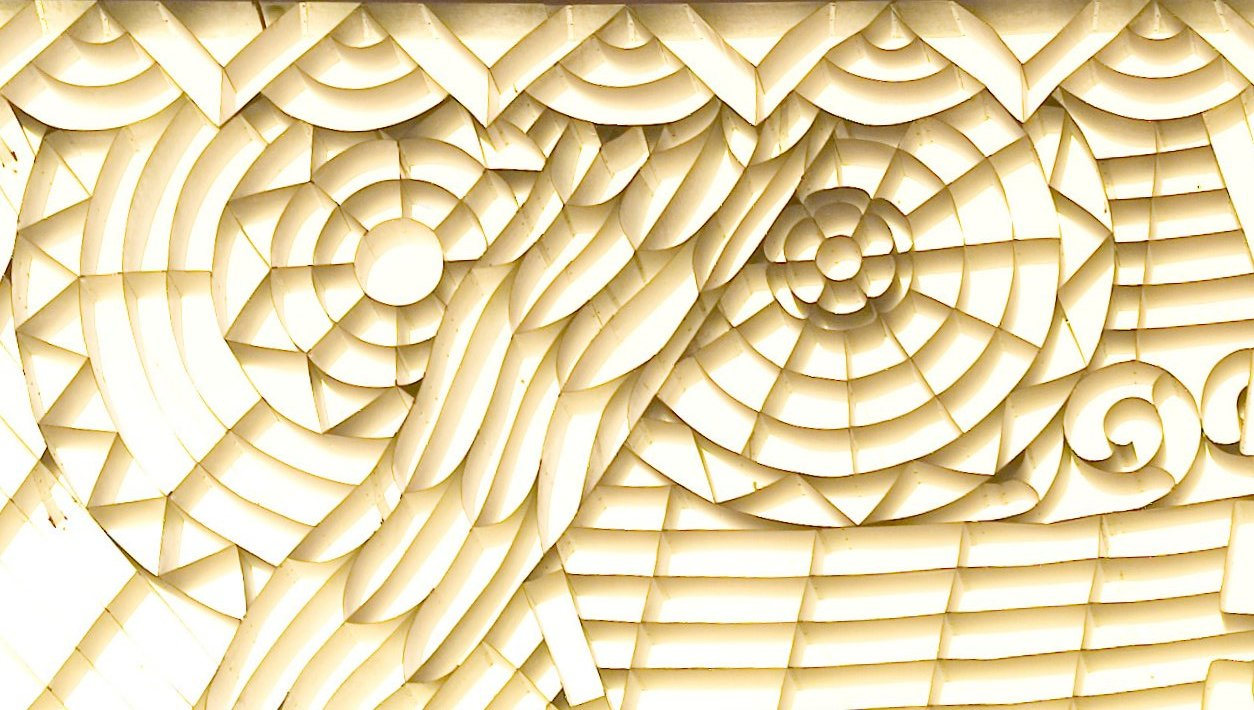
A small section of Timothy L. Pflueger's patented ceiling grid which extends over the entire auditorium

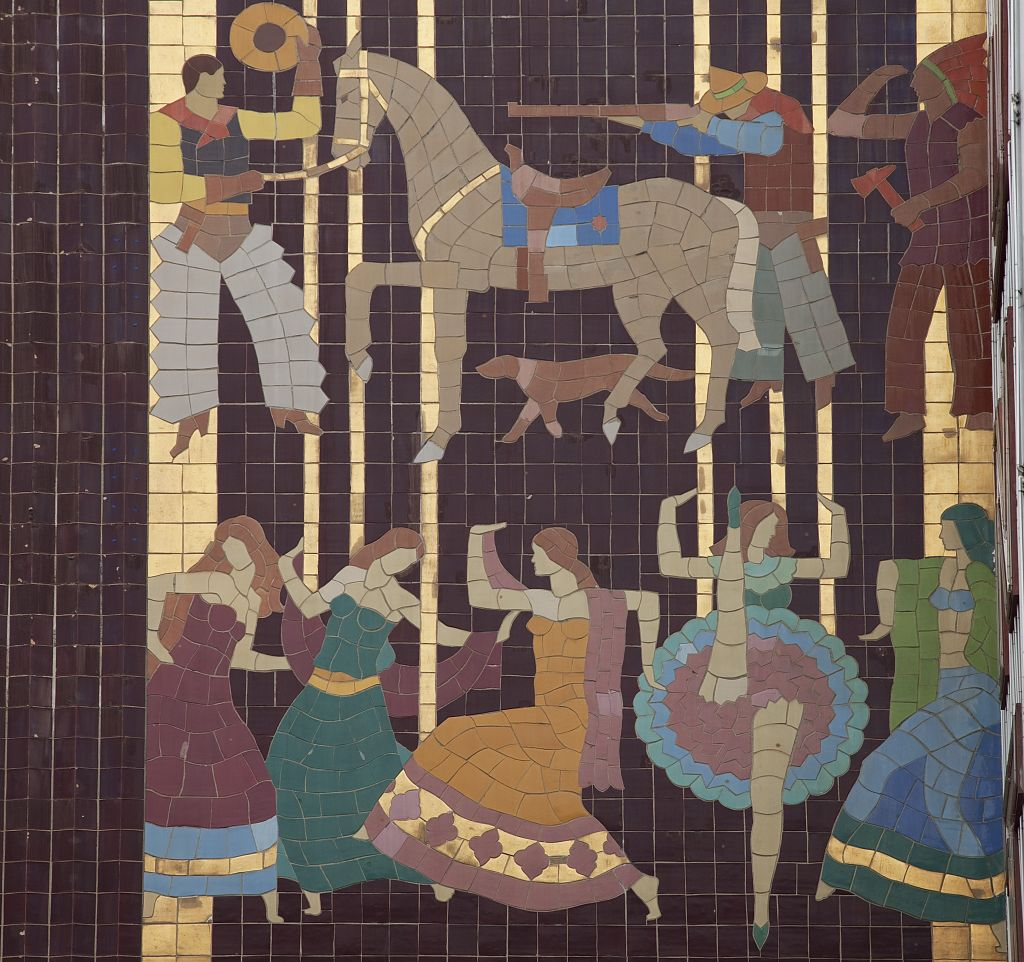
Detail of mosaic on facade

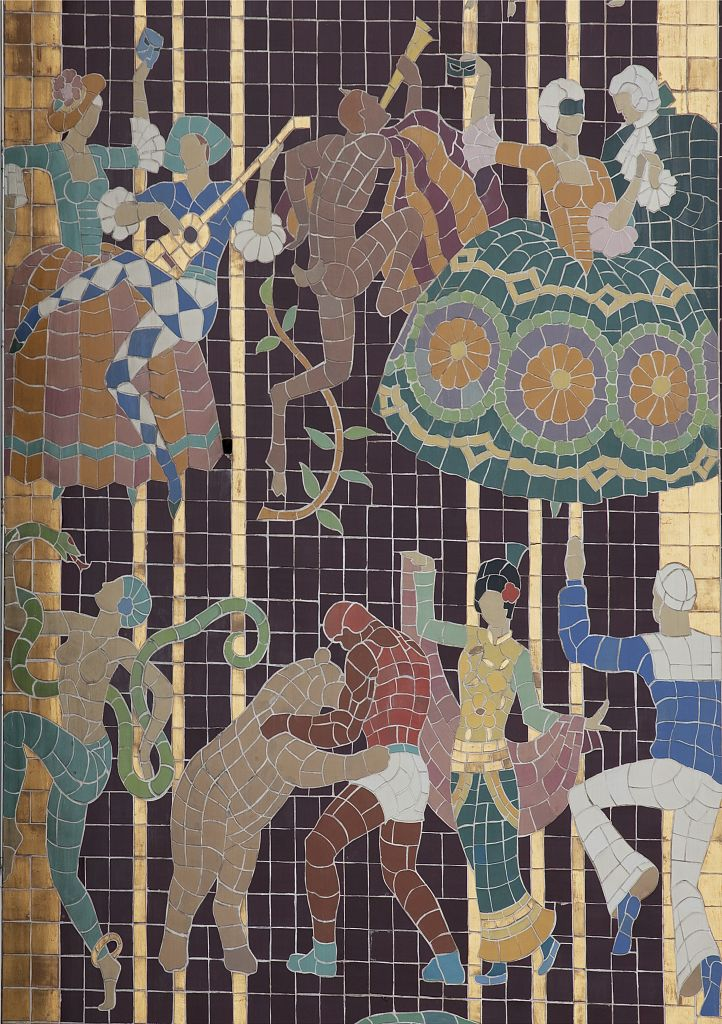
Detail of mosaic on facade

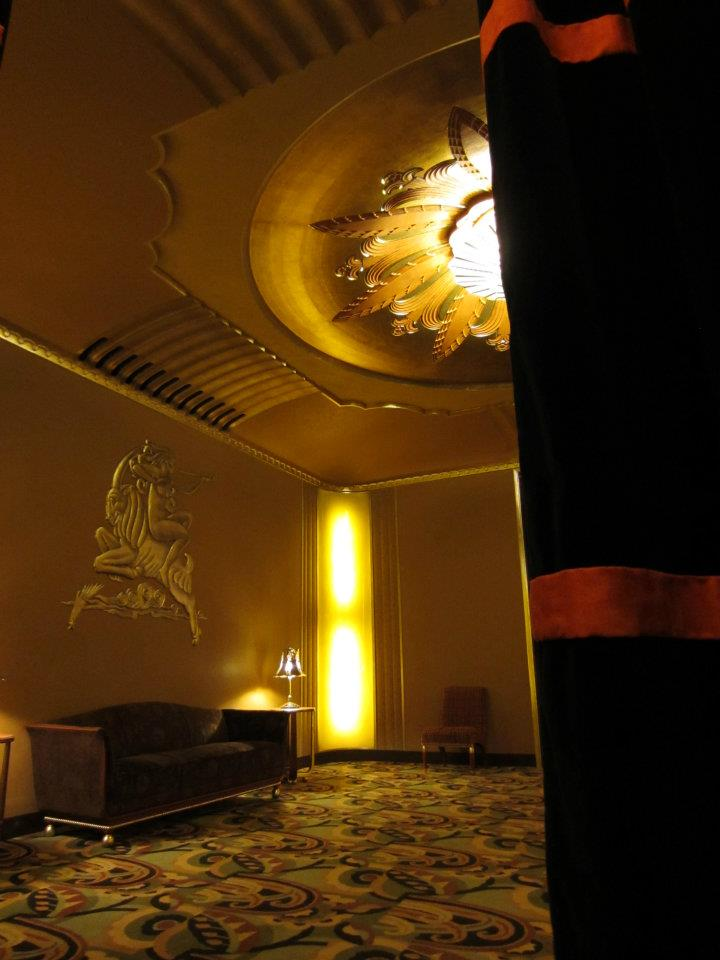
Detail of Women's Lounge, basement level
- Alvin Tenpo's smugmug photos of the Paramount Theater, Oakland, California
- Flickr photos of the Paramount Theatre, Oakland, California

== Main events ==
=== Symphony and ballet ===
Michael Morgan was music director from September 1990 until his death in August 2021. With its May 18, 2007, performance of George Gershwin's Porgy and Bess sold out, the Oakland East Bay Symphony opened its final rehearsal to the public.

In December 2007, the Oakland Ballet celebrated the 35th anniversary of Ronn Guidi's Nutcracker at the Paramount Theatre, with Michael Morgan conducting the music of Tchaikovsky.

=== Notable concerts ===
The Paramount has hosted concerts by a wide variety of acts since the mid-1970s, including Bob Marley & The Wailers, Bruce Springsteen & The E Street Band, Prince, James Brown, Diana Ross, Bonnie Raitt, Al Green, Jeff Beck, Lionel Richie, B.B. King, Anita Baker, Brian Wilson, Elvis Costello, Gladys Knight, Lucinda Williams, and Nelly Furtado.

1974

- Boz Scaggs "Slow Dancer", March 4

1975

- Bob Marley & The Wailers, July 8
- Patti LaBelle with Nona Hendryx and Sarah Dash, September 9
- Nancy Wilson, Les McCann, Hubert Laws, Esther Phillips, Stanley Turrentine, "Jelly Roll Jazz Festival", October 3
- Boz Scaggs "A Night to Remember", December 29

1976

- Grover Washington Jr., George Benson, January 16
- Vladimir Horowitz, February 15
- Bob Marley and the Wailers, May 29 and 30
- Bruce Springsteen & the E Street Band, October 2

1977

- Peter Allen, December 15
- Al Jarreau with The Crusaders, December 31

1978

- Ronnie Laws, Flora Purim, Airto Moreira, February 9
- Oingo Boingo Band, October 31

1986

- Ashford & Simpson, December 6

1988

- Jackson Browne Band, David Crosby, Graham Nash, November 2 and 3

1991

- Natalie Cole (Unforgettable Tour)
- Daryl Hall & John Oates
- Jean-Luc Ponty

1992

- Morris Day, Jerome Benton, Edwin Hawkins, David Whitfield
- En Vogue
- David Sanborn Band with comedian Jeff Cesario

1994

- The Canton Spirituals with The Blind Boys of Alabama, The Fairfield Four
- Lyle Lovett
- Earth, Wind & Fire
- Illinois Jacquet Big Band, J. J. Johnson Quintet, The "Jazz at the Philharmonic" All-Star Jam with Tommy Flanagan, Benny Carter, Roy Haynes and Al McKibbon

1995

- Anita Baker
- Harry Belafonte
- Jackson Browne
- "California Blues – Swingtime Tribute" with Johnny Otis, Charles Brown, Jay McShann, Jimmy Witherspoon, Jimmy McCracklin, Lowell Fulson and Earl Brown
- Fourplay
- Kirk Franklin and Family
- Mississippi Mass Choir with Dorothy Norwood, Olivet Institutional Baptist Church, Choir of Oakland
- Rachelle Ferrell with Will Downing, Gerald Albright, Jonathan Butler
- Bonnie Raitt
- Stevie Wonder

1996

- Tori Amos
- k.d. lang
- Tom Waits

1997

- Ashford & Simpson with Maya Angelou
- Charles Brown with Ruth Brown, John Lee Hooker, Bonnie Raitt
- Sarah McLachlan with Madeleine Peyroux
- Maxwell
- Nicholas Brothers, Count Basie Orchestra, Donald O'Connor, Williams Brothers
- "Porgy and Bess" concert Joe Henderson sextet with Tommy Flanagan, Dave Holland, Al Foster, Conrad Herwig and Stephan Harris

1998

- Amy Grant
- Lyle Lovett
- Bonnie Raitt
- Lionel Richie

1999

- Jeff Beck
- James Brown
- Sheryl Crow
- Rubén González with Ibrahim Ferrer
- Lauryn Hill
- B.B. King
- Maxwell
- Britney Spears, July 29
- Tom Waits
- Neil Young March 20

2000

- Mary J. Blige
- James Brown with Tower of Power
- D'Angelo
- Will Downing, Gerald Albright, Chanté Moore and Phil Perry
- Rickie Lee Jones, with Dan Hicks & the Hot Licks
- Maze with Frankie Beverly
- Paul Simon

2001

- Erykah Badu
- Björk
- James Brown with Tower of Power
- Isaac Hayes and the Oakland East Bay Symphony: Musical tribute to Gordon Parks
- Alicia Keys
- Maxwell (musician)
- Tori Amos

2002

- Jeff Beck
- Mary J. Blige
- Ani DiFranco, Bruce "U. Utah" Phillips, Toshi Reagon
- Enrique Iglesias
- Alicia Keys with Glenn Lewis
- Pat Metheny Group
- Teddy Pendergrass
- Prince "One Nite Alone With Prince", U.S. Spring tour
- Bonnie Raitt

2003

- Erykah Badu
- Anita Baker
- James Brown
- Earth, Wind & Fire
- Al Green
- Brian McKnight with Mýa
- Sigur Rós

2004

- Natalie Cole
- Will Downing, with Kem, Kenny Lattimore
- Josh Groban
- Enrique Iglesias
- Taj Mahal
- Sarah McLachlan
- The Temptations and the Four Tops
- Wilco Band

2005

- Elvis Costello
- Dead Can Dance
- Bob Dylan
- Tom Jones, with Tower of Power
- Journey
- Alicia Keys
- David Gray
- Gerald Levert, Eddie Levert
- Ricky Martin
- Brian McKnight
- Bonnie Raitt
- Jill Scott
- The Whispers & Howard Hewett
- Jethro Tull

2006

- James Blunt
- Toni Braxton
- Elvis Costello
- Donald Fagen
- David Gilmour
- Al Green with Booker T. Jones
- R. Kelly
- B.B. King, special guest Mavis Staples
- Gladys Knight
- Madeleine Peyroux with Vienna Teng
- Robert Plant
- Tool

2007

- Pepe Aguilar & His 20-Piece Mariachi Orchestra
- Tori Amos
- Benise
- The Black Crowes
- Crowded House
- Earth, Wind & Fire
- Kenny "Babyface" Edmonds
- Nelly Furtado
- Ben Harper & The Innocent Criminals
- Iron & Wine
- Dave Koz with Jonathan Butler, Wayman Tisdale and Kimberley Locke
- Lauryn Hill
- Diana Ross—U.S. "I Love You" tour, Produced by Live Nation, November 4
- Twelve Girls Band
- Tyrese, with Ginuwine
- Lucinda Williams
- Brian Wilson

2008

- Erykah Badu with The Roots
- Bowfire
- Jill Scott
- 70s Soul Jam with The Stylistics, Bloodstone, The Delfonics, The Chi-Lites and Main Ingredient featuring Cuba Gooding Sr.
- Donna Summer
- Keith Sweat, Bell Biv DeVoe, Tony! Toni! Toné!
- The Temptations & Four Tops
- The Whispers, Stephanie Mills
- Dream Theater
- Max Raabe and the Palast Orchester

2011

- One Direction

=== Stand-up comedy ===
- 1974 – George Carlin
- 1975 – Richard Pryor, Lily Tomlin
- 1997 – Bernie Mac
- 2000, 2001 – Jamie Foxx
- 2004, 2007 – George Lopez
- 2005 – Bill Cosby
- 2006 – Lewis Black
- 2007 – Mike Epps
- 2008 – Cedric the Entertainer, Katt Williams
- Chris Rock (1997, 1999, 2003, 2008)
  - The three sold-out performances by Chris Rock in 2003 included a total attendance of 8,883 and a total gross of $448,000.
- Jerry Seinfeld (1996, 2001, 2004, 2011)
  - In 2004, the four sold-out performances of Seinfeld grossed $819,390; 12,001 patrons is a record since the renovation and re-opening of the Paramount Theatre back in 1973.
- 2023 - Louis CK

==== Black Comedy Explosion ====
- 1990 Paul Mooney, Martin Lawrence, Shawn Wayans, Damon Wayans, Larry La La, Laura Hayes
- 1991 Martin Lawrence, Jamie Foxx, Chris Thomas, Yvette Wilson
- 1992 Jamie Foxx, Chris Thomas, Yvette Wilson
- 1993 D. L. Hughley, Paul Mooney, Chris Tucker, Yvette Wilson, Ruben Paul
- 1994 George Wallace, Mark Curry, Chris Tucker, Chris Spencer
- 1995 Chris Rock, Mark Curry, Cedric the Entertainer
- 1996 Dave Chappelle, Cedric the Entertainer, Tommy Davidson
- 1997 Jamie Foxx, Yvette Wilson, Cedric the Entertainer, Chris Thomas, D. L. Hughley, Arnez J, Sheryl Underwood, Guy Torry
- 1998 Tommy Davidson, Don 'D.C.' Curry
- 1999 Don "DC" Party, Sheryl Underwood, Mike Epps
- 2000 D. L. Hughley
- 2001 Guy Torry, Bruce Bruce, Ricky Smiley
- 2002 Tommy Davidson, Sheryl Underwood, Alex Thomas
- 2004 Sheryl Underwood, Paul Mooney
- 2005 D. L. Hughley, Lavelle Crawford
- 2007 Lavelle Crawford, Earthquake, Sheryl Underwood, Ruben Paul

=== Live stage plays ===
- 1997 – The musical play The Wiz was at the Paramount, with Grace Jones, Peabo Bryson and CeCe Peniston.
- 2001 – The Diary of Black Men, directed by Clarence Whitmore, a play that had been touring the country since 1983
- 2006 – Tyler Perry's Madea Goes to Jail played to a packed seven-date stint at the Paramount.
- 2008 – Andrew Lloyd Webber's musical Cats was performed in May.

=== Classic movie nights ===
It wasn't until 1987 that the Paramount returned to its true calling as a movie house, showing Buster Keaton's The General (1926), a silent film accompanied by the Wurlitzer. In 1988, Casablanca (1942), starring Humphrey Bogart and Ingrid Bergman, launched the first movie series. The 2002 feature was Peter Sellers in Dr. Strangelove (1964).

In 2002 it showed Wizard of Oz (1939), with Judy Garland, and in 2004 the Paramount showed several classic movies: Harvey (1950), starring James Stewart, Viva Las Vegas (1964) starring Elvis Presley and Ann-Margret, The Graduate (1967) with Dustin Hoffman and Anne Bancroft, and The Bad and the Beautiful (1952) starring Kirk Douglas and Lana Turner.

The Paramount Movie Classics series continues scheduling screenings throughout the year and is enthusiastically supported by guests and staff members alike who often dress up in costume as movie characters.

=== Other ===
In order to accommodate the large number of people attending on the High Holy Days, since 2001 Oakland's Temple Sinai has held its main High Holy Day services at the Paramount, filling the entire 1,800 seats on the mezzanine of the theater, and most of the 1,200 seats in the balcony.

=== Notable events ===
The Black Filmmakers Hall of Fame was founded in 1973 in Oakland. They held elegant events that honored such screen legends as Clarence Muse, Hattie McDaniel, Billy Dee Williams, Melvin Van Peebles, and Danny Glover with the Oscar Micheaux Awards. Some of the events were hosted at Oakland's Paramount Theatre. In 2001 Harry Belafonte, Eubie Blake and Diahann Carroll was inducted in the Filmmakers Hall of Fame at the Paramount.

1995 – Poet Maya Angelou read from her work at a benefit at Paramount for the St. Paul's Episcopal School.

1999 – Actress Halle Berry was at the Paramount for the premiere of Introducing Dorothy Dandridge, an HBO docudrama.

2007 – Former Congressman Ron Dellums was sworn in on Monday, January 8, as Oakland's 48th mayor in a public ceremony at the Paramount Theatre. A crowd of 1,900 people gathered for the ceremony.

2011 – Hosting of the premiere for the 2011 film Moneyball. The cast as well as some Oakland Athletics players and executives attended the premiere.

2012 – Abel Gance's film Napoléon had four screenings from March 24 to April 1 as part of the San Francisco Silent Film Festival. Accompanied by a live orchestra, Napoléon was shown at the original 20 frames per second and ending with a 20-minute final triptych sequence. These, the first US screenings of British film historian Kevin Brownlow's 5.5-hour-long restored version, were described as requiring three intermissions, one of which was a dinner break. Score arranger Carl Davis led the 46-piece Oakland East Bay Symphony for the performances.

== See also ==
- Alameda Theatre (Alameda, California)
- Fox Oakland Theater
- Grand Lake Theater
