= Kedrick Armstrong =

American conductor

- Born: 1994/1995 (age 31–32); Georgetown, South Carolina, U.S.
- Education: Wheaton College; University of Colorado Boulder
- Occupation: Conductor
- Employer: Oakland Symphony
- Website: kedrickarmstrong.com

Kedrick Armstrong (born 1994/1995) is an American conductor. He has been music director of the Oakland Symphony since 2024.

== Early life and education ==
Armstrong was born and raised in Georgetown, South Carolina. He grew up in a "very religious household", playing gospel music and becoming pianist for his church at the age of 12. He learned to play the clarinet, and gained a working knowledge of other orchestral instruments.

Armstrong enrolled at South Carolina Governor's School for the Arts & Humanities. Following high school, he attended Wheaton College, where he was the only Black student in the music conservatory. He graduated from Wheaton in 2016 with a bachelor's degree in music. In June 2020, Armstrong wrote an open letter calling for more diversity in the college's curriculum, which had 766 co-signers and prompted reforms in the conservatory.

Armstong attended graduate school at the University of Colorado Boulder, earning a masters degree in orchestral conducting in 2023. Drawn to Boulder by their Helen Walker-Hill Collection, Armstrong's graduate research focused on Black women composers, including Julia Perry and Irene Britton Smith; he conducted a world premiere of Smith's 1956 orchestral work, Sinfonietta, with the CU Boulder Symphony Orchestra. While he was still in grad school, The Washington Post included Armstrong in a list of "22 composers and performers to watch in 2022".

== Career ==
While living in Chicago, Armstrong worked as a church music director and freelance conductor. He served as guest conductor for ensembles including the Chicago Opera Theater, Chicago Sinfonietta, and the Lyric Opera of Chicago, where he conducted the world premiere of The Factotum and served as music mentor for their youth empowerment program. He then served as principal conductor and creative partner of the Knox-Galesburg Symphony.

After serving as guest conductor for the Oakland Symphony on three occasions, in April 2024 Armstrong was named to succeed the late Michael Morgan as their new music director. He debuted at the symphony's season opening in October 2024.

== Personal life ==
Armstrong lives in Oakland, California. He is queer. He enjoys cooking, and says his faith is a "big part of my life".
