= John A. Gosling =

- Born: May 18, 1928; Trenton, New Jersey
- Died: October 18, 2004 (aged 76) Savannah, Georgia
- Genres: Classical
- Instruments: Trumpeter, conductor

John A. Gosling (May 18, 1928 in Trenton, New Jersey – October 18, 2004 in Savannah, Georgia) was an American trumpeter and conductor of classical music. He studied trumpet (under William Vacchiano) and conducting at the Juilliard School in New York. He served as music director of the Erie Philharmonic from 1967 to 1973, and of the North Carolina Symphony in 1973. In 1968, while music director of the Monterey Symphony, he founded the Bear Valley Music Festival in Bear Valley, California, and served as conductor and music director of that festival until 1984.
