= Michael Foumai (composer) =

American classical music composer (born 1987)

Michael Thomas Foumai
- Occupation: Composer
- Organization: Composer-in-residence for the Hawaii Symphony
- Known for: Raise Hawaiki
- Website: www.michaelfoumai.com

Michael Thomas Foumai (born 1987, Honolulu, Hawai'i) is an American composer of classical music. He is the first Composer-in-Residence at the Hawai'i Symphony Orchestra as well as its Director of Artistic Engagement. Foumai serves on the faculty of the University of Hawaiʻi at Mānoa in the Theory & Composition area. He cites composer John Williams as inspiration as well as film, anime, poetry, classical music and Hawaiʻi.

== Education ==
Foumai was raised on Oʻahu, in Makiki. Foumai discovered his love for music, playing the violin at Kawānanakoa Middle School. Foumai attended Roosevelt High School, where he performed his first orchestra piece, graduating in 2005. Foumai graduated from University of Hawaiʻi with a Bachelor of Music in 2009. He earned his Masters of Music (2011) and Doctorate of Music (2014) in composition from the University of Michigan in Ann Arbor.

== Career ==
In the early part of Foumai's career, he garnered fellowships, grants and accolades for his compositions. In 2014, the Alabama Orchestra Association named Foumai its 2014 winner of their annual composition contest, with his original work, Kinder-Und Hausmärchen: A Grimm Overture, which premiered at the All-State Orchestra Festival in February of that year.

Foumai was awarded the Fromm Fellowship Commission at Harvard University in 2014. For this project, he composed the Manookian Murals, which premiered in Philadelphia in 2016, supported by the Dolce Suono Ensemble.

In 2015, the Portland Symphony Orchestra commissioned Foumai's Becoming Beethoven. Centering Beethoven's hearing loss, the work threaded motives from the 5th, 6th, 7th, and 9th symphonies as Beethoven triumphed to created classic works. Also that year, Foumai composed Full Metal, its title derived from the manga series Fullmetal Alchemist by Hiromu Arakawa. This was commissioned by with Conductor Jacob Harrison and the Iowa State University Orchestra. The American Composers Orchestra premiered Foumai's The Spider Thread, based on the short story The Spider's Thread by Ryūnosuke Akutagawa in 2015 as well.

In 2018, the Portland Symphony Orchestra commissioned Foumai The Telling Rooms, which premiered in 2019 with Eckart Preu as conductor. The Telling Rooms was based on poems by three poes—Aubrey Duplissie, Husna Quinn and Eliza Rudalevige—called "The Happiest Color", "Dressed in Red" and "Ink Wash".

In 2019, Foumai's Raise Hawaiki, inspired by story of the Polynesian voyaging greats Eddie Aikau, Nainoa Thompson, Mau Piailug, Sam Kaʻai and Sam Low in the Hōkūleʻa, was performed by the Hawai'i Symphony Orchestra with the Oʻahu Choral society, choirs from University of Hawai'i at Mānoa, Kapiʻolani Community College, University of Hawai'i at West Oʻahu, the Hawaiʻi Youth Opera Chorus and community choir. Later that year, a portion of it, Raise Hawaiki: Kealaikahiki (The Way to Tahiti), was conducted by John Devlin.

In 2021, seven of Foumai's works were showcased in the "Sheraton Starlight Series" at the Waikīkī Shell. The works featured were Becoming Beethoven, Raise Hawaiki: Kealaikahiki (The Way to Tahiti), Fullmetal, Rat Race! (inspired by Tom and Jerry) and the premiere of Overture on Themes from the Songbook of Her Majesty Queen Liliʻuokalani which was conducted by Sarah Hicks.

In 2022, as part of its Rock My Soul festival, the Los Angeles Philharmonic commissioned Foumai to arrange the music of Florence Price, titled A Piece for Solo Piano and Orchestra after Florence Price's Fantasie Nègre No. 1. It premiered at the Walt Disney Concert Hall in Los Angeles and was curated by soprano Julia Bullock and conducted by Lidiya Yankovskaya.

In 2022, Foumai's composed Defending Kalo for violin and harp, commissioned by the Composing Earth project and the Gabriela Lena Frank Creative Academy of Music. It premiered at the Harvard-Epworth United Methodist Church, Cambridge, Boston, MA. In Breath Water Spirit, composed for cello and piano, Foumai continued to explore the tradition of the stories of Hawai'i. This piece was commissioned by Lili and Wilson Ervin.

In 2023, "Living Pono", a harp concerto, premiered at the Annapolis Symphony Orchestra and was conducted by José-Luis Novo.

== Awards and fellowships ==
- BMI Student Composer Award (2010)
- BMI Student Composer Award (2011)
- Sioux City Symphony, Composer of the Year (2012)
- Jacob Druckman Prize (2012)
- Presser Foundation Award, American Prize (2013)
- BMI Student Composer Award (2013)
- Music Teachers National Association, Composer of the Year (2013)
- Fromm Foundation, Commission (2014)
- Intimacy of Creativity Fellowship at the Hong Kong University of Science and Technology (2014)
- Inaugural Kaplan Fellow in Composition at the Bowdoin International Music (2015)
- ASCAP Foundation, Young Composer Award (2017)
- Pacific Century Fellows (2022)
