= Fantasie Nègres =

Set of four piano fantasies by Florence Price

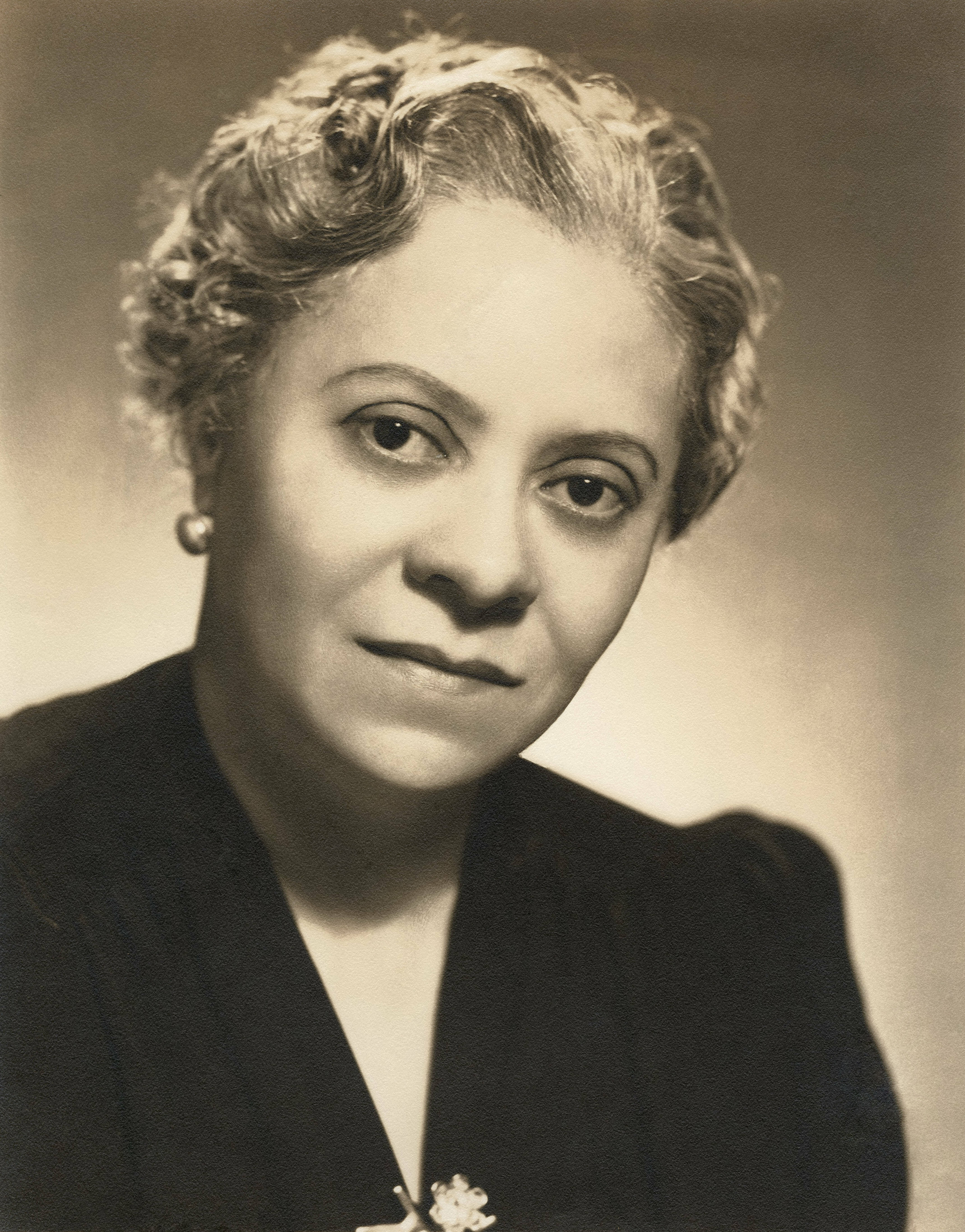
Price c. 1940

The Fantasie Nègres are a set of four solo piano fantasies by American composer Florence Beatrice Price composed between 1929 and April 1932. Written in a variety of keys, the fantasies were inspired by African American spirituals.

== Fantasies ==
=== No. 1 in E minor ===
Composed in 1929, two year after Price moved to Chicago, Illinois, Fantasie Nègre No. 1 in E Minor was dedicated to Margaret Bonds. It was premiered in 1932 as part of ballet choreographed by Katherine Dunham with Bond preforming. The work is an adaptation/liberal interpretation of the African American spiritual, "Sinner Please Don’t Let This Harvest Pass." Price revised in piece in early 1932.

According to Horace J. Maxile Jr. of the Journal of the American Musicological Society, unlike it's succeeding three fantasies which contain original themes that are "sonically akin to spiritual melodies." According to pianist Samatha Ege, the work "cascade of notes" and lower melody belonged to "Sinner Please Don’t Let This Harvest Pass." According to James Harrington, of Fanfare: The Magazine for Serious Record Collectors, the work also contains "passing hints" of the spiritual "Sometimes I Feel Like a Motherless Child."

=== No. 2 in G minor ===
Fantasie Nègre No. 2 in G Minor was composed in early to mid March 1932. According to John Michael Cooper of Wise Classical Music, the piece is unique for its allusions to "ancestral repertoires." He states the No. 2 is based on a four-stage "call-and-response figure" that transitions between a fanfare and ascending arpeggios both in D major. Additional, he states that the two main themes, in G minor and B-flat major, demonstrate "Price's rich harmonic technique" through "highly chromatic episodes" and "ingenious contrapuntal combination", and that the work ends with a "chordal allusion" to the Christian hymn "How Great Thou Art."

=== No. 3 in F minor ===
Price composed Fantasie Nègre No. 3 in F Minor on March 30, 1932. Originally thought to have been lost aside from two pages, Samantha Ege discovered the rest of the original manuscript within a box on a shelf of Price's archive. By using the music from the known pages, Ege tracked down remaining fragment through shared motifs and reconstructed the piece in its entirety. The manuscript is currently held at the University of Arkansas. While the pieces begins in the key of F minor, the second page of the manuscript ended in A-flat major.

=== No. 4 in B minor ===
Composed on April 5, 1932, Fantasie Nègre No. 4 in B Minor the piece's main theme was written in B minor, a tonal area in G major and a coda. Price submitted it to in Musical Composition for Composers of the Negro Race section in the 1932 Rodman Wanamaker Musical Composition Contest, in which it received an honorable mention. It was premiered on June 15, 1937, at a Composer Forums concert arranged by the Federal Music Project in Chicago, by pianist Marion Hall MacFadyen.

According to R. Larry Todd and Kathrine Uhde of Journal of the Society for American Music, the piece opens an "improvisatory mood-setting passage" containing an arpeggio gesture within the tonic before shifting to a descending B harmonic minor scale. This leads to a passage with "expressive wave-shaped and circular motives." They additional stated that the work shares structural similarities to Price's Violin Fantasy No. 1, which was written the following year. According to John Michael Cooper of Wise Classical Music, while measures 150 to 153 allude to a cadenza-like transition, the following 2 bars reiterate the work's second theme in G, "complete with a raised fifth degree that produces a two-bar augmented sonority rare in the vernacular idioms of the two main themes."

== Reception ==
In the 21st-century, Ege stated that fantasies No. 2, 3 and 4 were "reminiscent of Brahms", like "three self-contained miniatures," and that they showed a differing side of "Price's composition voice" in contrast to her "Black folkloric style." In 2020, James Bennett II– of WQXR-FM– stated was the No. 1 in E minor was sonic equivalent of a fond memory, praising Price for her transformation of "llyrically haunting melodies into a somnambulant nocturne" in a manner evocative of Chopin. In 2022, Scott Noreiga of Fanfare: The Magazine for Serious Record Collectors praised No. 1 in E minor as a "tour de force," comparing its composition style to that of "Liszt or Thalberg." In 2023 John T. K. Scherch of WRTI 90.1 stated that No. 4 in B minor resembled combination between a jazz band and the music of Clara Wieck Schumann.

== Recordings ==
Title	Pianist	Fantasie(s) recorded				Year	Label	Catalogue ID
Title	Pianist	No. 1	No. 2	No. 3	No. 4	Year	Label	Catalogue ID
Kaleidoscope: Music by African-American Women	Helen Walker-Hill	Yes	No	No	No	2002	Leonarda	#339
America Again	Lara Downes	Yes	No	No	No	2016	Sono Luminus	DSL 92207
Nasty Women	Joanna Goldstein	Yes	No	No	No	2018	Centaur Records	CRC 3631
Some of These Days	Lara Downes	No	Yes	No	No	2020	Flipside Music	FL 0024
Fantasie Nègre: The Piano Music of Florence Price	Samantha Ege	Yes	Yes	Yes	Yes	2021	Lorelt	LNT 144
Revival: Music of Price & Bonds	Michelle Cann	Yes	Yes	No	Yes	2023	Curtis Studio	N/A
African Pianism, Vol. 2	Rebeca Omordia	Yes	No	No	No	2024	Somm CD	SOMMCD 0688
Fantasie	Jeneba Kanneh-Mason	Yes	No	No	No	2025	Sony Classical	3 Differing (Note: CD: 19802889462; Digital: G010005427435H, G0100054263178)
Piano Heroines: Hensel, Wieck, Beach, Price	Claire Huangci	No	Yes	No	No	2026	Alpha	ALPHA 1231
