= Michael Morgan (conductor) =

American conductor (1957–2021)

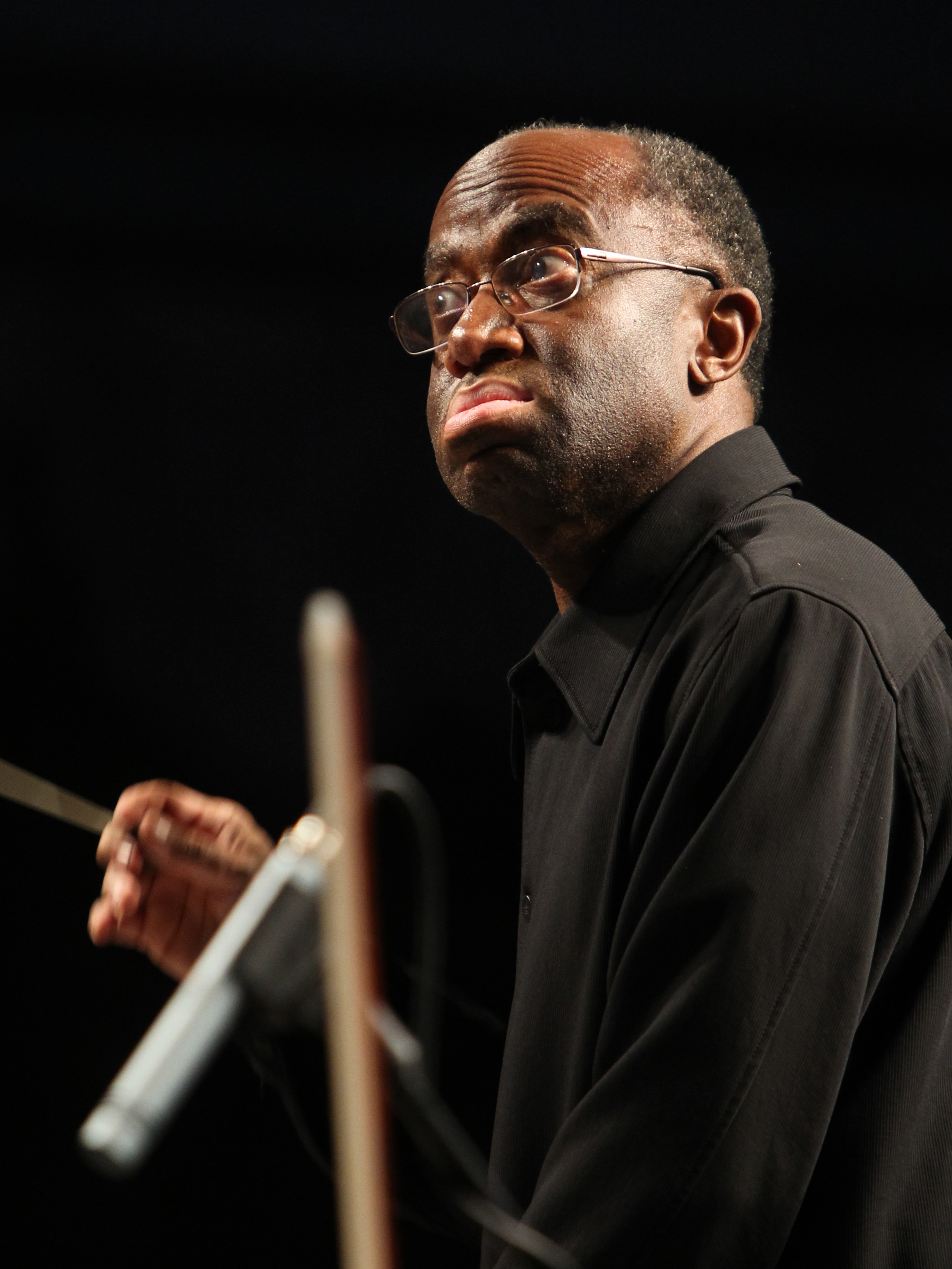
Morgan in 2013

Michael DeVard Morgan (September 17, 1957 – August 20, 2021) was an American conductor. He was music director of the Oakland Symphony (formerly Oakland East Bay Symphony) for 30 years. He was also music director of the Sacramento Philharmonic Orchestra, artistic director of Festival Opera in Walnut Creek, California and music director of the Bear Valley Music Festival in Bear Valley, California, where his final public performances took place.

== Early life and education ==
Michael Morgan was born and raised in Washington, D.C., where he attended public schools. His father Willie DeVard Morgan was a biologist; his mother Mabel Morgan was a health researcher. He began to play the piano at age 8, and by age 12 he was conducting two orchestras, one at MacFarland Junior High School, the other at his church. He attended McKinley Technology High School in D.C., and was the conductor of the D.C. Youth Orchestra. He attended Oberlin College Conservatory of Music but did not graduate. He spent a summer at the Oberlin College Conservatory at Tanglewood. There he was a student of Gunther Schuller and Seiji Ozawa, and it was at that time that he first worked with Leonard Bernstein.

== Career ==
In 1979 he became apprentice conductor for the Buffalo Philharmonic. In 1980, he won first prize in the Hans Swarovsky International Conductors Competition in Vienna, Austria and became Assistant Conductor of the Saint Louis Symphony Orchestra, under Leonard Slatkin. His operatic debut was in 1982 at the Vienna State Opera in Mozart's The Abduction from the Seraglio. In 1986, Georg Solti chose him to become the assistant conductor of the Chicago Symphony Orchestra, a position he held for five years under both Solti and Daniel Barenboim.

He became music director of the Oakland Symphony (formerly Oakland East Bay Symphony) in 1991. He served as artistic director of the Oakland Youth Orchestra, music director of the Sacramento Philharmonic Orchestra, and artistic director of Festival Opera in Walnut Creek, California. He also taught the graduate conducting course at the San Francisco Conservatory of Music. In 2002 and 2003 he taught conducting at the Tanglewood Music Center and led conducting workshops around the country. He taught a conducting workshop in Winnipeg, Canada and returned to South America as a guest conductor. As stage director he led productions of Bernstein's Mass at the Oakland East Bay Symphony, and a modern staging of Mozart's Don Giovanni at Festival Opera. As a chamber musician (piano) he appeared on the Chamber Music Alive series in Sacramento as well as occasional appearances in the Bay Area. As a guest conductor he appeared with most of America's major orchestras including the New York Philharmonic, New York City Opera, St. Louis Opera Theater, the San Francisco Symphony, San Francisco Ballet, and Washington National Opera. In 2012, he was named music director of the Bear Valley Music Festival. Maestro Morgan's final public performances were with the Bear Valley Festival Orchestra on August 1, 2021.

== Awards ==
In 2005 he was honored by the San Francisco Chapter of The Recording Academy with the 2005 Governors Award for Community Service. On the opposite coast, the American Society of Composers, Authors and Publishers (ASCAP) chose Morgan as one of its five 2005 Concert Music Award recipients. ASCAP further honored Oakland East Bay Symphony in 2006 with its Award for Adventurous Programming. The San Francisco Foundation honored him with one of its Community Leadership Awards, and he received an honorary doctorate from Holy Names University.

== Personal life ==
Morgan was openly gay. He said that "Being a classical musician, being a conductor, being black, being gay – all of these things put you on the outside, and each one puts you a little further out than the last one" and that "you get accustomed to constructing your own world because there are not a lot of clear paths to follow and not a lot of people that are just like you". A private person, he lived with his mother and sister. For the last seven years of his life he was on daily kidney dialysis. He received a kidney transplant in May 2021, but contracted an infection, and died on August 20, 2021, at the age of 63.

== See also ==
- Black conductors
