= Oakland Symphony =

Orchestra in Oakland, California

- Classical symphony orchestra
- Former name: Oakland East Bay Symphony
- Founded: 1933 (93 years ago); 2015 (11 years ago) (restablished)
- Disbanded: 1986 (40 years ago)
- Location: Oakland, California, U.S.
- Music director: Kedrick Armstrong (since 2024)
- Website: oaklandsymphony.org

The Oakland Symphony is an American orchestra, based in Oakland, California. The orchestra is resident at the Paramount Theatre (Oakland, California). Founded in 1933, the orchestra filed for Chapter 7 bankruptcy in 1986. Musicians from the orchestra reorganised in 1988 as the Oakland East Bay Symphony (OEBS). The orchestra reverted to its original name in 2015.

== History ==
=== 1933–1986 ===
In 1933, the Oakland Symphony Orchestra was formed under the leadership of conductor Orley See, who became its first music director. The orchestra presented four concerts in the lobby of the Oakland YMCA in its first season. See served as music director until his death in 1957. Piero Bellugi was the orchestra's second music director, from 1957 to 1959.

In 1959, Gerhard Samuel became the orchestra's music director. During the 1960s, the home of the orchestra was the Oakland Civic Auditorium (now the Kaiser Convention Center). During Samuel's tenure, the orchestra's season expanded from 8 to 24 concerts, and the orchestra developed a national reputation in the United States for its programming and community work. In 1964, Samuel oversaw the creation of the Oakland Symphony Youth Orchestra, with 75 student musicians under the leadership of composer Robert Hughes. The Oakland Symphony Youth Orchestra performed in schools and for community organizations, and regularly commissioned and premiered works, financed through volunteer activities. As well, the youth orchestra made five commercial recordings and toured internationally, and won a silver medal at the Herbert von Karajan Festival in Berlin. Samuel also oversaw the establishment of the Oakland Symphony Chorus.

In 1966, the Ford Foundation undertook a national programme of matching grants to selected American cultural institutions for them to establish long-term financial stability through the building of endowment fund. From this programme, the Oakland Symphony was one of sixty-one American orchestras chosen for a matching grant, of $1.35M USD, the largest grant available to orchestras of its size.

In 1971, Harold Farberman became the orchestra's music director. Under Farberman, the annual subscription series expanded from 24 to 33 concerts. The orchestra introduced a 'Pops' Series and concerts for young people, with educational programs in schools. The orchestra also undertook free concerts in public places and campaigns to reach out to diverse ethnic populations. The latter included a 'Minority Orchestral Fellowship Program', to offer young string players from non-white backgrounds opportunities to play one year with a professional orchestra. The programming under Farberman also reduced the number of contemporary works and increased the proportion of standard classical repertoire.

In 1972, the Oakland Symphony Association acquired and renovated the 2,998-seat Paramount Theatre), with key donations from Steven Bechtel Jr. and Edgar Kaiser Sr., who also served as board president. This 1973 restoration project later received an award in 1981 from the National Trust for Historic Preservation. Later declared a National Historic Landmark, the Paramount Theatre attracted audiences and the orchestra sold nearly all its house on subscription. However, even with such audience numbers, the Paramount proved to be a financial burden. The symphony association financed the renovation costs with a $1 million loan. In 1975, rather than continue absorbing the Paramount's operating losses, the symphony association transferred the theater to the City of Oakland for $1, in exchange for 40 years' free rent. To pay off the remaining renovation loan, the board converted its Ford Foundation grant funds originally earmarked for endowment into operating funds. In subsequent years, the orchestra spent those converted Ford Foundation matching funds, until their eventual depletion.

Farberman stood down as music director in 1979. Calvin Simmons became the orchestra's music director as of the 1979–1980 season, the first African-American conductor named to the post. Simmons served as music director until his death in 1982. After Simmons' death, Leonard Slatkin became artistic consultant to the orchestra for the 1982–1983 season. The orchestra was in a financially difficult point in its history, as debts were mounting, while attendance figures remained essentially stable.

Richard Buckley became the orchestra's music director in 1983. Under Buckley, the symphony continued expanding its season offerings, in the face of mounting debts and essentially stable audience figures. The symphony received favorable reviews, though its subscription sales stayed flat and single ticket sales were in decline. In the 1985–1986 season, the musicians went on strike, leading to the cancellation of the season's October 1985 opening. The strike was resolved in November 1985, where the settlement included significant increases in orchestra services and player earnings. Simultaneously, the board was undergoing a radical and controversial reorganization that alienated some long-time supporters and left the board structure chaotic.

In the spring of 1986, the orchestra announced expansion to its largest season ever, with services added to its existing programs at the Rheem Theatre (Moraga, California) and Zellerbach Hall (Berkeley, California), and a decision to return its main subscription series to its former home, the Oakland Auditorium theater, now known as the Calvin Simmons Theatre. A month after announcing that expansion, orchestra management cut that season almost in half, citing financial crisis, and requested a 30% pay reduction from the orchestra musicians on the contract signed less than eight months earlier. Management and musicians did not reach a compromise. On 21 August 1986, management filed for reorganization under Chapter 11 of the Federal Bankruptcy Code, On 12 September 1986, musicians' representatives and the management/board negotiating team held their only meeting to negotiate the issues. The musicians rejected management's position. Representatives of the Oakland Symphony Association board subsequently voted to file for liquidation of the association under Chapter 7 of the Federal Bankruptcy Code.

A retrospective analysis by Melanie Beene, Patricia Mitchell, and Fenton Johnson investigated in detail the history of the orchestra that culminated in the 1986 bankruptcy declaration. One partial evaluation of the factors that culminated in the 1986 bankruptcy reads, with reference to the final contract negotiations that failed to resolve the situation:

'Those negotiations were the culmination of years of unrealistic expectations on the part of the players and the Association managements and board members. For the board and management, there was the desire to be "major", as a matter of civic and musical pride. For the players, too, there was the desire to be "major", both in terms of earnings, and in professional comparison with their colleagues. These desires, however, obscured the extremely problematic realities of Oakland's situation – its place in a secondary market competing with San Francisco; its chronic inability to generate sufficient increases in audience and ticket revenue; and its worsening financial crisis.'

=== 1988–2015 ===
After the bankruptcy and dissolution of the Oakland Symphony, the Oakland Symphony Youth Orchestra and Oakland Symphony Chorus continued to function, retaining the orchestra's parent name in their own organisational names. In 1988, musicians from the past Oakland Symphony and the Oakland Symphony League (Oakland Symphony Guild) jointly formed a new orchestra, the Oakland East Bay Symphony (OEBS). The OEBS appointed Michael Morgan as its music director, and he took up the post as of the 1990–1991 season.

=== 2015–present ===
In 2015, the OEBS reverted to the orchestra's past name of the Oakland Symphony. Morgan continued as the music director of the Oakland Symphony until his death in August 2021. During the final two decades of Morgan's tenure, the orchestra had not worked with any guest conductors, with Morgan serving as sole conductor.

In 2022, Kedrick Armstrong first guest-conducted the orchestra. He returned for additional guest conducting appearances in 2023 and 2024. In April 2024, the orchestra announced the appointment of Armstrong as its new music director, with immediate effect.

== Music directors ==
- Orley See (1933–1958)
- Piero Bellugi (1958–1959)
- Gerhard Samuel (1959–1971)
- Harold Farberman (1971–1979)
- Calvin Simmons (1979–1982)
- Richard Buckley (1983–1986)
- Michael Morgan:
  - 1990–2015 (music director, Oakland East Bay Symphony)
  - 2015–2021 (music director, Oakland Symphony)
- Kedrick Armstrong (since 2024)

== Assistant conductors ==
- 2026 Zachary Salsburg-Frank

== Awards ==
- 1977 ASCAP Award for Adventurous Programming
- 1978 ASCAP Award for Adventurous Programming
- 1982 ASCAP Award for Adventurous Programming

== See also ==
- Arts and culture in Oakland, California
- List of symphony orchestras in the United States
- Music of California
