= Sacramento Philharmonic Orchestra =

Sacramento Philharmonic & Opera
- Orchestra
- Former name: Sacramento Symphony Orchestra
- Founded: 1948
- Concert hall: SAFE Credit Union Performing Arts Center
- Principal conductor: Michael Morgan (1997–2021) Ari Pelto (music director & chief conductor) (2026-2029)
- Website: www.sacphilopera.org

The Sacramento Philharmonic and Opera is one of the Sacramento region's leading performing arts organizations and is the professional symphony orchestra and opera in the Sacramento region. The nonprofit organization as it is now, was established in 2015 after the merger of the Sacramento Philharmonic (formerly symphony) and Sacramento Opera and is currently led by Giuliano Kornberg, who is the chief executive officer.

The original Sacramento Symphony was founded in 1948. The Sacramento Philharmonic (prior to the merger with the Opera), newly formed in 1999, was led by maestro Michael Morgan for 15 years, The orchestra performs at the SAFE Credit Union Performing Arts Center. In 2023, Ari Pelto joined the Sacramento Philharmonic as artistic advisor and principal conductor. In 2026, Ari Pelto was appointed Music Director and Chief Conductor.

The Sacramento Philharmonic & Opera has now performed for nearly 500,000 greater Sacramentans through orchestra, opera, pops, elementary school, pop-up, and civic partnership concerts and events since 2015, including multiple sold-out performances at the SAFE Credit Union Performing Arts Center.

In addition to those attending orchestral and opera presentations, SP&O has reached 30,000 3rd-5th grade students in Title 1 schools through music education offerings including full orchestra “Link Up” concerts in partnership with Carnegie Hall. As one of the largest and most frequent Sacramento-based tenants of SAFE PAC, in ten years the SP&O has held more than 300 concert events and rehearsals at the SAFE PAC, engaging more than 650 greater Sacramento classical musicians and bringing to Sacramento some 175 internationally celebrated guest artists and conductors. The SP&O continues to provide live music for performances of The Nutcracker with the Sacramento Ballet, and has provided live music for the first four Harry Potter movies. In addition, the orchestra has performed twice with Andrea Bocelli at the Golden 1 Center.

== History ==
=== Sacramento Symphony Orchestra ===
The Sacramento Symphony was established in 1948 and rapidly became a large regional orchestra made up of local professional musicians. However, starting in 1986 and continuing through the mid-1990s, the Sacramento Symphony had severe administrative difficulties and ran into significant operating deficits, repeatedly filing for bankruptcy. Despite several moderate bail-outs from businesses, the general public and local government, in 1997 the Sacramento Symphony officially closed its doors.

Directors included Fritz Berens (1956?-1963?), who helped found the Sacramento Youth Symphony, Harry Newstone (1965–78), who oversaw the move from the Memorial Auditorium and the Hiram Johnson High School Auditorium (where most of the concerts were held) to the new Community Center, Carter Nice (1979–92) and Geoffrey Simon.

=== The Sacramento Philharmonic ===
Established the same year as the symphony shut down, the new Sacramento Philharmonic, composed almost entirely of the same orchestra members, featured a significantly smaller schedule. The philharmonic, with the support of Sacramento County, sought to avoid the unfortunate fate of the defunct symphony and requested several market studies from national firms to help determine the potential for professional orchestral music in the Sacramento region. With a similar population to Cleveland, which has a world-famous orchestra in the highest calibre, the potential, as determined by the studies, seemed positive.

In 2013, the Sacramento Philharmonic merged with the Sacramento Opera to form the Sacramento Region Performing Arts Alliance. A year after the merger, the new group announced it would sit out the 2014–15 season due to financial problems and disagreements between leaders of the two formerly separate organizations.

In April 2015, the organization announced that it would reopen for the 2015–16 season. The group promoted its return with a series of surprise flash-mob style performances at locations throughout the city and merger with the Sacramento Opera to create one organization.

In 2022, the organization appointed Giuliano Kornberg as executive director. Kornberg has since led the organization through enviable artistic success and financial growth. In 2024, the Sacramento Philharmonic & Opera announced that it had performed for a record 400,000 greater Sacramentans; subscription revenue had increased 45%; and the organization had raised over $10 million in gifts and sponsorships to both the Sacramento Philharmonic & Opera and the Sacramento Philharmonic & Opera Foundation (its Endowment) since 2015. In 2023, Ari Pelto was named principal conductor and artistic advisor and in 2026, he was appointed Music Director and Chief Conductor. The Sacramento Philharmonic & Opera's management and musicians are currently in a three-year collective bargaining agreement, securing a robust slate of performances.
