= San Francisco subway =

San Francisco subway can refer to

- Muni Metro
- Bay Area Rapid Transit
- Market Street subway
- Central Subway (San Francisco)
