= Chinese Historical Society of America =

Chinese-American museum in San Francisco, California

Coordinates: 37°47′38″N 122°24′32″W

- 美國華人歷史學會

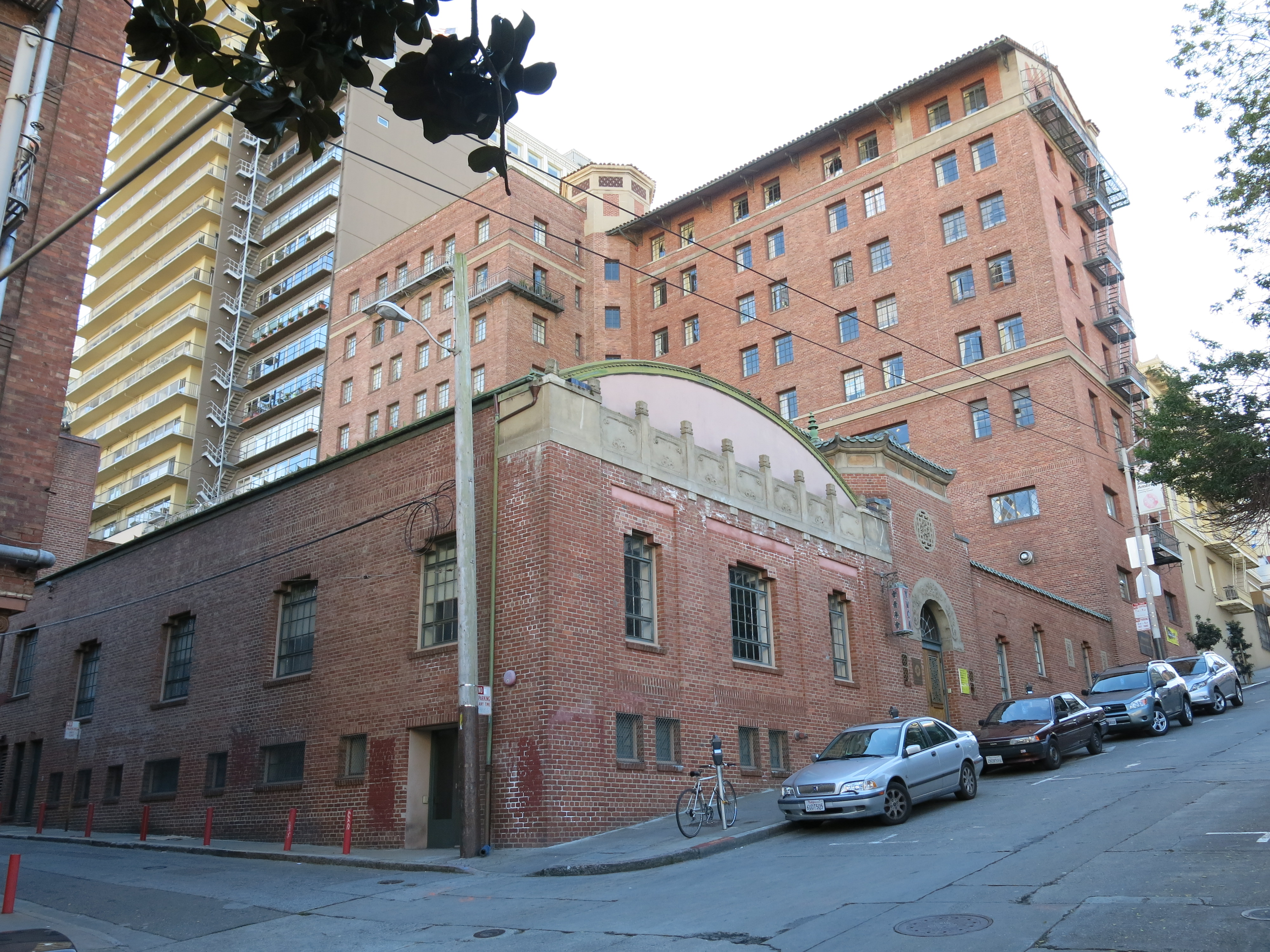
- Chinatown YWCA building, designed by Julia Morgan
- Headquarters: 965 Clay Street; San Francisco
- Website: chsa.org

The Chinese Historical Society of America (simplified Chinese: 美国华人历史学会; traditional Chinese: 美國華人歷史學會; pinyin: Měiguó Huárén Lìshǐ Xuéhuì; Jyutping: Mei^{5}gwok^{3} Waa^{4}jan^{4} Lik^{6}si^{2} Hok^{6}wui^{6}; abbreviated CHSA) is the oldest and largest archive and history center documenting the Chinese American experience in the United States. It is based in the Chinatown neighborhood of San Francisco, California.

== History ==
Conceived in the fall of 1962 and incorporated on January 5, 1963, the CHSA was founded by Thomas W. Chinn, C.H. Kwock, Chingwah Lee, H.K. Wong, and Thomas W.S. Wu D.D.S. with a mission “to promote the contribution that the Chinese living in this country have made to their adopted land, the United States of America,” aiming to challenge a norm which excluded the history of Chinese immigrants in building California and the American West. US curriculum and instruction has under-told and under-acknowledged the experiences and contributions of Asian Americans, which the CHSA has addressed with public resources and programs that add to the public record and inspire appreciation among a wide audience.

CHSA is a nonprofit 501(c)(3) offering permanent, rotating and traveling exhibitions, public events, and a center for research, scholarship, and learning about the contributions and legacy of Chinese in America. CHSA collaborates with groups locally and nationally to provide opportunities to engage with content and history of, by and for Chinese Americans and Asian Americans.

== Location ==
The CHSA initially met in various private homes until 1966, when it moved into its first permanent headquarters, that the Shoong Foundation had donated to function as a museum, a small space at 17 Adler Place, San Francisco, CA 94133 (off 1140 Grant Avenue, now Jack Kerouac Alley).

In June 1989, CHSA moved to 650 Commercial Street, occupying the former Chinatown YWCA building that had been designed by noted architect Julia Morgan.

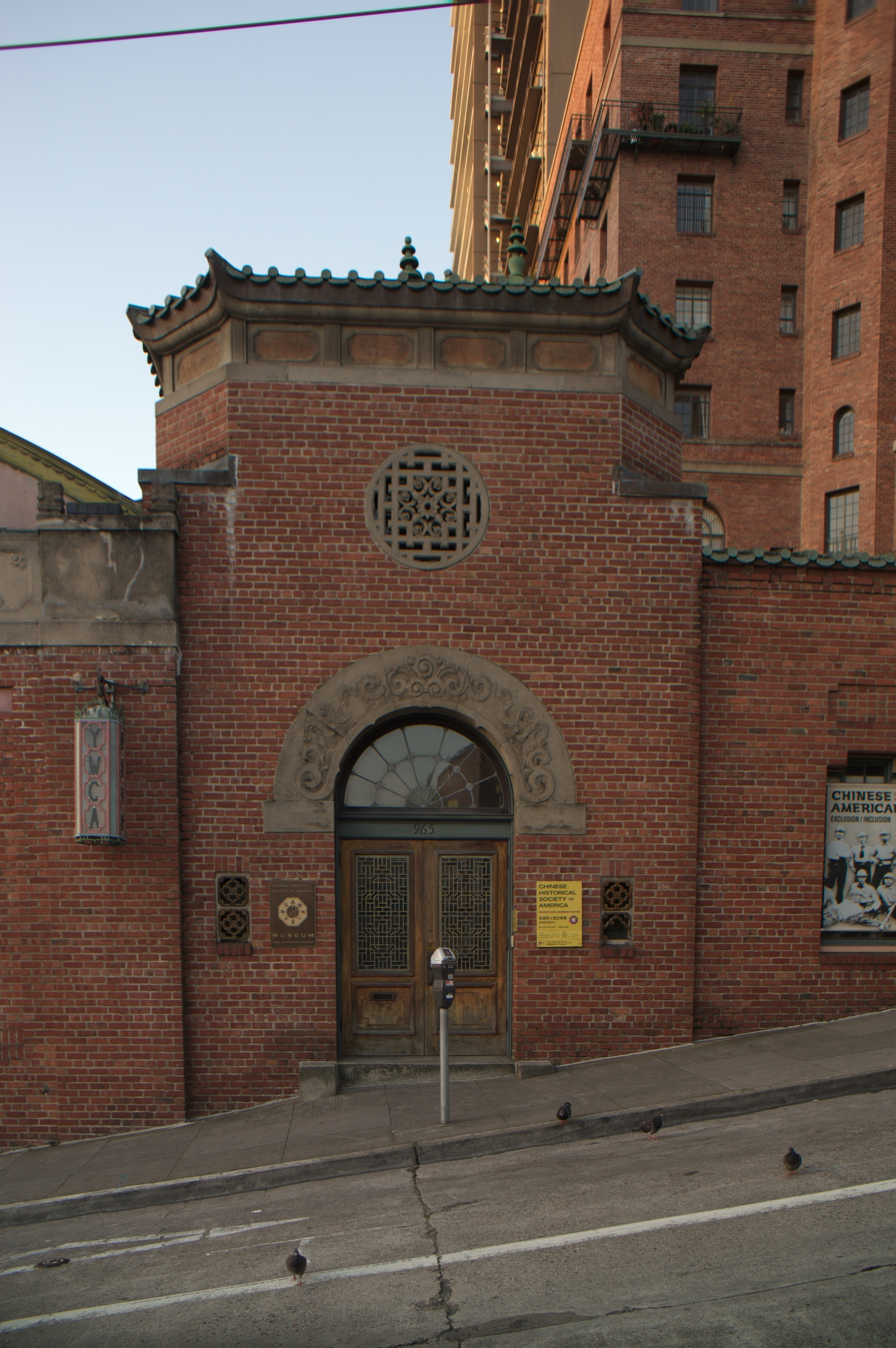
2001 CHSA Museum, at former Chinatown YWCA branch, 965 Clay Street

"CHSA headquarters relocated from Adler, Commercial, and Broadway."

Morgan was contracted to design the now-historic building in consultation with Chinese-Americans, and it included cultural elements from Chinese arts and crafts. This first Chinatown branch of the YWCA had been occupying a former saloon at Stockton and Sacramento since 1916, until October 1929 when the San Francisco YWCA passed a Resolution to build a new facility on three adjacent lots bounded by Joice, Clay, and Powell. The new building was occupied from 1932 until it was damaged in the 1989 Loma Prieta earthquake. It sat vacant until the Board of the YWCA decided to sell the building to the CHSA in 1996,and with the help of Supervisor Tom Hsieh and Mayor Willie Brown, Significant restoration work ensued for CHSA's occupancy and use.

In November 2001 the CHSA relocated and opened the Chinese Historical Society of America Museum and Learning Center in the Chinatown YWCA building. The National Trust for Historic Preservation awarded the CHSA its National Preservation Honor Award in 2004 for its work restoring and retrofitting the 1932 building, nicknamed the "Lantern on the Hill". In 2005, CHSA received another award from the California Heritage Council for its restoration of the YWCA building .

== Exhibitions and Activities ==
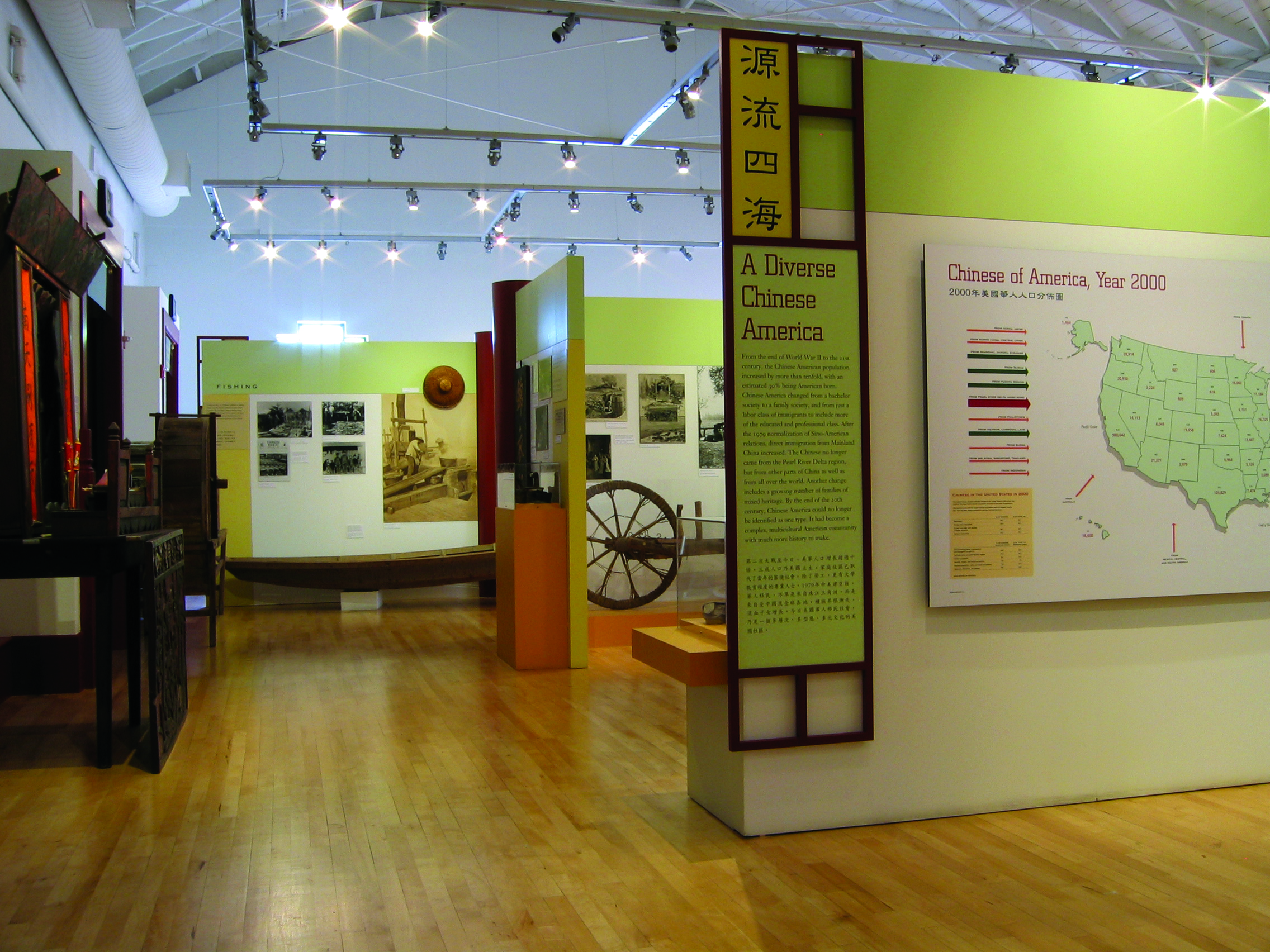
Historical exhibit

The CHSA Museum features the set of twelve Gum Shan (金山) paintings by Jake Lee which were originally commissioned for a private dining room in Johnny Kan's eponymous restaurant, which opened in 1959. The museum also has on permanent display the large mural One Hundred Years: History of the Chinese in America by James Leong, commissioned for the Ping Yuen Housing Project in the early 1950s.

From 2016 to 2021, 'Chinese American: Exclusion/Inclusion' was on display from New York Historical Society (NYHS), and later transferred to American Chinese Museum Foundation in Philadelphia. In 2017, Frank Wong donated his 'Forever, Chinatown' dioramas for CHSA's 'The Chinatown Miniatures Collection'. In 2018, the banner exhibit 'Towards Equality:California’s Chinese American Women' opened, and is now available for loan and with a curriculum guide. In 2022, the city of San Francisco awarded the CHSA $400,000 for the return of "We Are Bruce Lee: Under the Sky, One Family" as an extended museum exhibition. In 2025, students from San Francisco State University and Academy of Art University created a new exhibit entitled '“Challenging a Whitewashed History: Chinese laundries in the U.S."

In 2026, the CHSA and Chinese for Affirmative Action (CAA) commissioned a mural on the southwest corner of Grant Avenue and Sacramento Street, commemorating Wong Kim Ark, steps from where he born in 1873 to non-citizen parents. Also in 2026, the CHSA collaborated with USA Dragon and Lion Dance Sports Association, United Chinese Americans (UCA) and others for a national initiative celebrating the United States Semiquincentennial.

CHSA's press releases address current events such as the 2021 Atlanta Spa shootings, and in 2026 the Closing of the National Archives and Records Administration (NARA) facilities in San Bruno and Chicago.

== Publications & Collections ==
- Chinese America: History and Perspectives, founded by Him Mark Lai the 'dean of Chinese American history' (currently edited by SFSU Professor, Jonathan H. X. Lee), has been published annually by CHSA since 2010.
- CHSA also helped build the digital archives of Him Mark Lai and co-sponsored his 'In Search of Roots' Program where participants researched their Chinese American family history and genealogy, and visited their ancestral villages in Guangdong China.
- CHSA has a collection of nearly 22,000 Chinese and Chinese American historical artifacts. In 2022, the CHSA received $850,000 in funding from the State of California to digitize and modern its archives using augmented reality and virtual reality technology.

== See also ==
- Journal of Asian American Studies
- Him Mark Lai, Chinese Historical Society of America (1963–2009)
- Chinese American Museum
- Chinese American Historical Museum (Santa Clara County, California)
- Chinese Culture Center
- Chinese Historical Society of Southern California
- History of Chinese Americans in San Francisco
- Museum of Chinese in America
- Weaverville Joss House State Historic Park
- List of YWCA buildings
- List of works by Julia Morgan
- List of San Francisco Designated Landmarks
