= Central Subway (San Francisco) =

Light rail tunnel in San Francisco, California

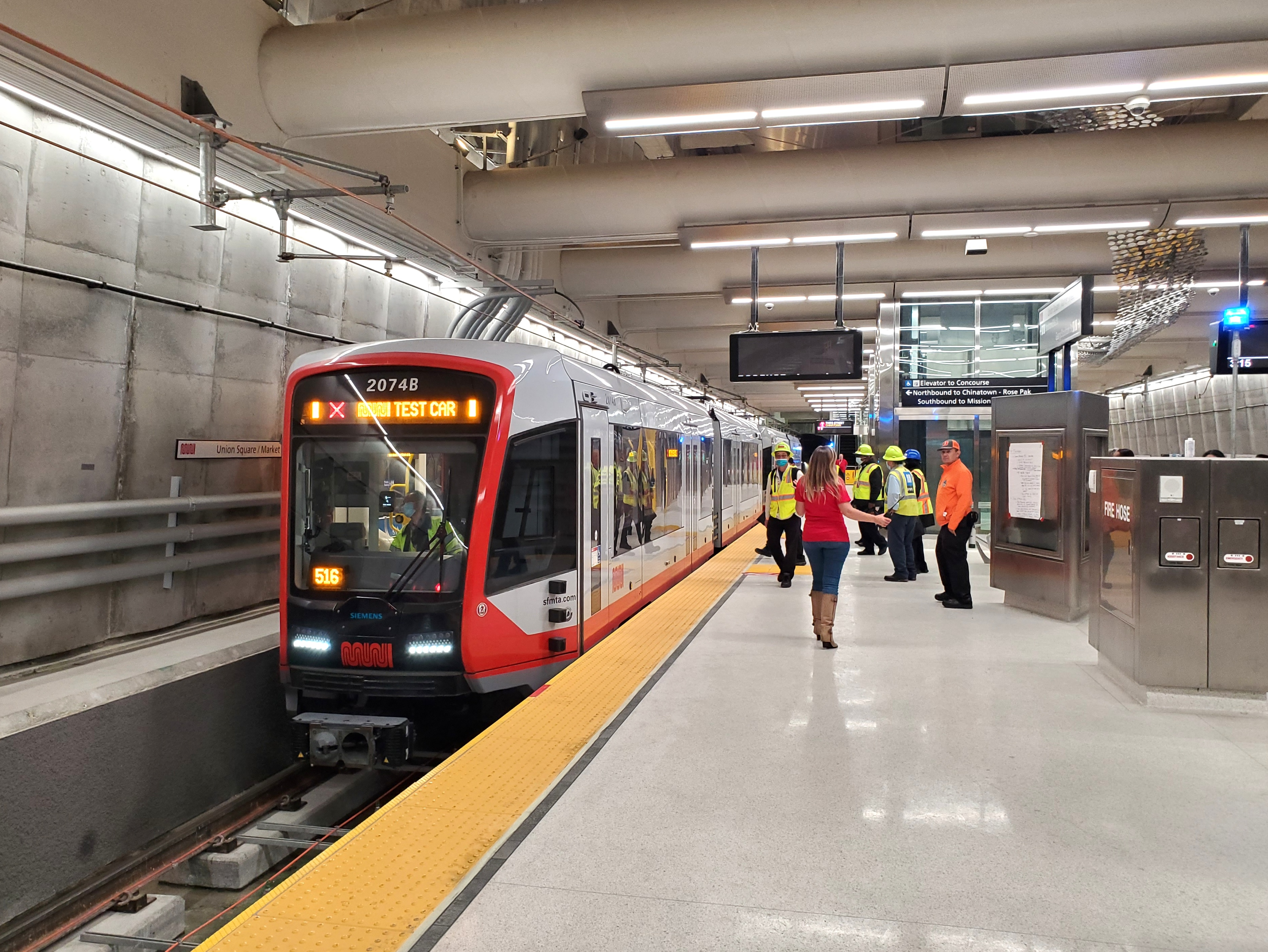
- A test train at Union Square/Market Street in November 2022

Overview
- Other name: Third Street Light Rail Project Phase 2
- Line: T Third Street
- Location: San Francisco, California
- System: Muni Metro
- Start: 4th Street portal 37.7799°N 122.3985°W
- End: Chinatown
- No. of stations: 3 (plus 1 surface as part of extension project)

Operation
- Work began: 2012
- Opened: November 19, 2022 (weekend-only shuttle service); January 7, 2023 (full service)
- Owner: San Francisco Municipal Transportation Agency
- Operator: San Francisco Municipal Railway
- Character: Light rail

Technical
- Line length: 1.7 mi (2.74 km)
- No. of tracks: 2
- Track gauge: 4 ft 8 1/2 in (1,435 mm) standard gauge
- Electrified: Overhead line, 600 V DC

Route map
Central Subway highlighted in red

The Central Subway is a Muni Metro light rail tunnel in San Francisco, California, United States. It runs between Chinatown station in Chinatown and a portal in South of Market (SoMa), with intermediate stops at Union Square/Market Street station in Union Square and Yerba Buena/Moscone station in SoMa. A surface portion runs through SoMa to connect to the previously existing T Third Street line at 4th and King station.

The project was initiated after the Embarcadero Freeway was demolished following the 1989 Loma Prieta earthquake, as activist Rose Pak "almost single-handedly persuaded the city to build" the Central Subway to compensate Chinatown for the loss of the fast cross-town connection. Originally set to open in late 2018, the subway initially opened with a weekend-only shuttle service between Chinatown station and 4th and Brannan station on November 19, 2022. Full service as part of the T Third Street line began on January 7, 2023. With the addition of the Central Subway, the T Third Street line is projected to become Muni Metro's highest ridership line by 2030.

The budget to complete the Central Subway was $1.578 billion. The project was funded primarily through the Federal Transit Administration’s New Starts program. In October 2012, the FTA approved a Full Funding Grant Agreement, the federal commitment of funding through New Starts, for the Central Subway for a total amount of $942.2 million. The Central Subway was also funded by the State of California, the Metropolitan Transportation Commission, the San Francisco County Transportation Authority and the City and County of San Francisco.

== Design ==
The tunnel is about 1.7 miles (2.7 km) long, including 0.4 miles (0.64 km) of non-revenue tail tracks, and includes three subway stations; the surface tracks built as part of the project are 0.4 miles (0.64 km) long and include one surface station. These surface tracks begin at 4th and King and continue northwest along 4th Street to 4th and Brannan station. The line enters the Central Subway at a portal under the Interstate 80 viaduct. Yerba Buena/Moscone station is located under 4th Street at Folsom Street. At Market Street, the subway crosses under the Market Street subway, with a reverse curve to align under Stockton Street. Union Square/Market Street station is located under Stockton Street between Market Street and O'Farrell Street, with an outside-fare-control connection to Powell Street station. The line continues north to Chinatown station at Washington Street. The twin subway tunnels continue north under Stockton Street and terminate under Columbus Avenue near Union Street, where the opportunity for extracting the excavators existed.

The platforms of all stations on the Central Subway can only accommodate two-car trains, limiting the capacity of the line.

== Cost ==
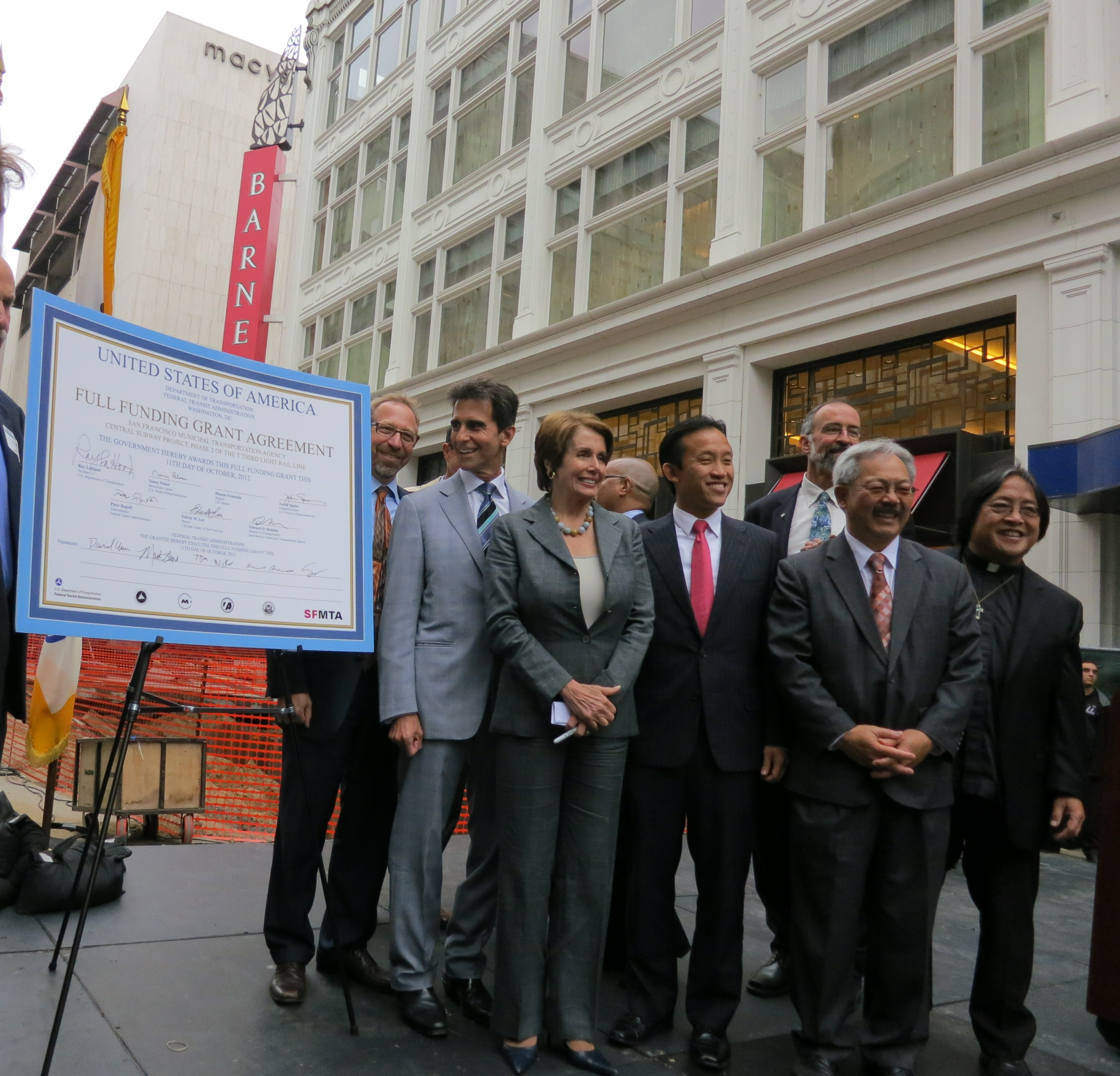
Rep. Nancy Pelosi, Mayor Ed Lee, and other dignitaries next to a poster-sized reproduction of the FTA Grant near Union Square (May 11, 2013)

In 2000, the estimated cost of the Central Subway project was $530 million. By 2001, the cost had risen to $647 million and completion was projected for 2009. When construction began in 2012, the cost had reached $1.6 billion. When the main contract for Central Subway construction was awarded in May 2013 to the lowest bidder, Tutor Perini, the $840 million contract was up to $120 million over the budgeted amount, which took up nearly two-thirds of the entire project's contingency.

Due to the capital cost ($1.578 billion for the 1.7 mile light rail line), the Central Subway project has come under criticism from transit activists for what they consider to be poor cost-effectiveness. In particular, they note that Muni's own estimates show that the project would increase Muni ridership by less than 1% and yet by 2030 would add $15.2 million a year to Muni's annual operating deficit.

Previous transit access to these areas was provided entirely on the surface through small blocks that feature intense pedestrian activity and narrow streets with multi-modal street congestion. Other, lower-cost rapid transit options were explored, such as bus rapid transit (BRT), but were rejected in part because these conditions do not support the basic features of efficient BRT operations. Compounding these conditions is the fact that many Chinatown residents are transit-dependent and do not own cars, helping rationalize funding for a subway. The high-ridership Muni bus lines serving Chinatown (e.g., the 1 California and the 30 Stockton) are typically over capacity.

In October 2012, the Federal Transit Administration (FTA) announced it would provide $942.2 million for the project under its New Starts program after indicating it would approve the grant in January. This award included the recognition that better, more comfortable service for an already intensively-used transit corridor, particularly for low-income residents as in Chinatown, justifies the investment even if it does not attract a high percentage of "new" riders the way a new rapid transit investment might somewhere that is not already served by extremely slow, uncomfortable high-ridership local service.

== Construction ==
A study released in 2000 called for the Central Subway as part of a larger plan to alleviate projected traffic gridlock which also included a light rail line along Geary. Voters approved the Central Subway in 2003, and the alignment was selected in 2008. Ground was broken for the project on February 9, 2010, however, physical work did not begin until June 2012. The first phases of work included preparation of the tunnel boring machine launch site and headwalls for the Yerba Buena/Moscone Station. At the time, the FTA grant had not been secured, and opponents were threatening lawsuits over potential disruption to traffic and businesses.

=== Tunnel boring ===
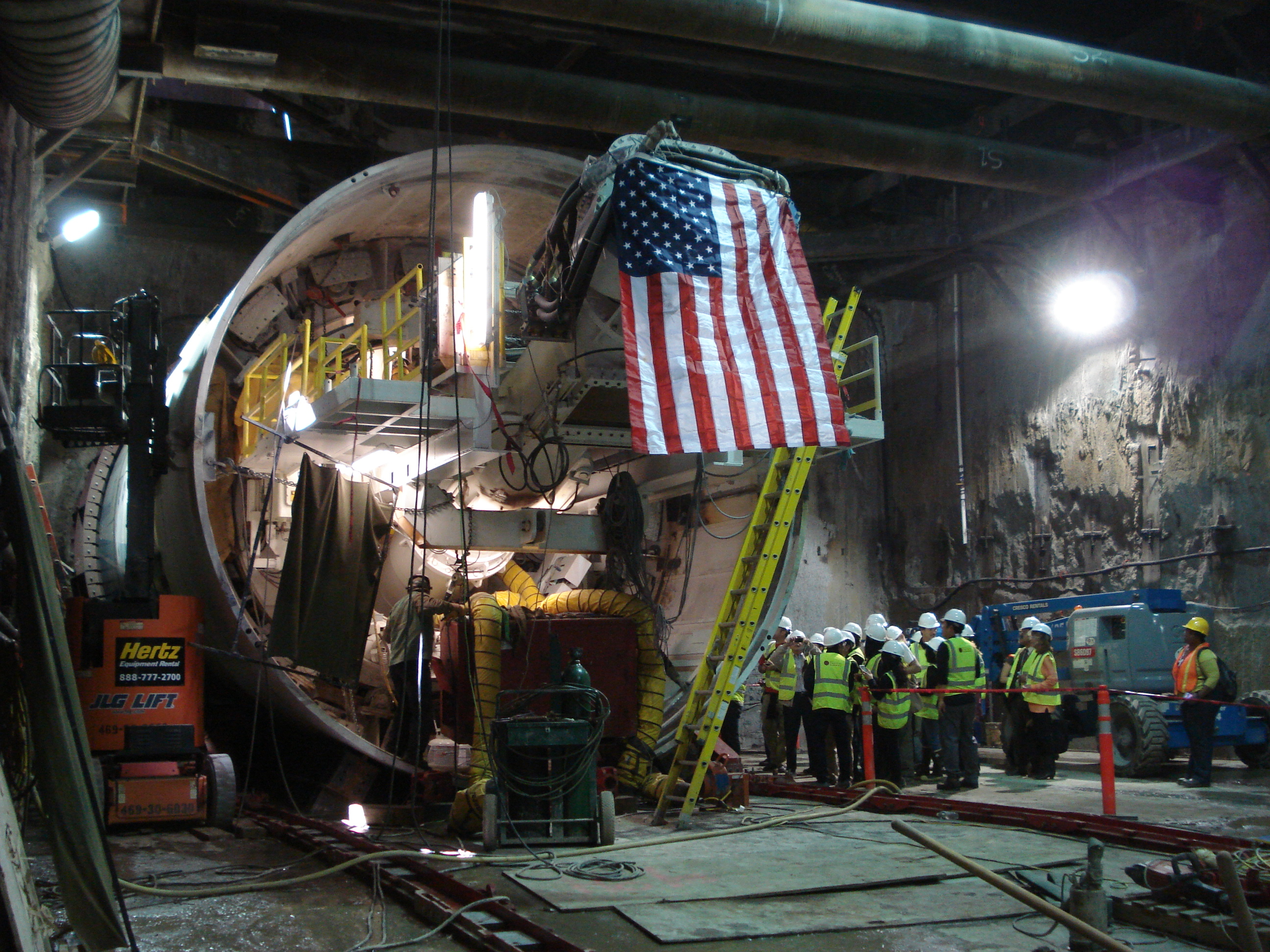
TBM "Mom Chung" prepares for launch, May 2013

The two tunnel boring machines (TBMs) are named "Big Alma" and "Mom Chung" (for "Big" Alma Spreckels and Dr. Margaret "Mom" Chung, respectively). Preparations for tunnel boring began on June 12, 2012, with the start of excavation for the TBM launch box on Fourth Street between Bryant and Harrison. "Mom Chung" was delivered to San Francisco in April and May 2013, and in late July 2013, "Mom Chung" began digging the tunnel for southbound T Third trains. "Big Alma" began digging north in November 2013 at a slightly faster rate, 54 ft/d (16 m/d), compared to the 44 ft/d (13 m/d) average of "Mom Chung".

The initial plan was to remove the two TBMs near Washington Square in North Beach in 2014 once boring was complete. On July 31, 2012, a lawsuit was filed in Superior Court by Marc Bruno and Save North Beach, a 501(c)(4) organization of North Beach merchants and residents who believed that the removal of the equipment on Columbus Avenue would cause permanent harm to the neighborhood near Washington Square. The petitioners pointed out in their suit that they are in favor of the city's "Transit First" policy and that they would favor the removal of the equipment if a subway stop was planned, approved and financed for their neighborhood. Muni General Manager Ed Reiskin announced a plan in December 2012 to extend the tunnel to Columbus and Powell, using the site of the long-closed Pagoda Palace theater to extract the TBMs, with a potential option to purchase the Pagoda as the site of a future North Beach station. In 2013, MTA reached a lease agreement with the owners of the Pagoda to tear down the old building and use its site for TBM removal. This will reduce impact of construction on the public space.

On June 11, 2014, "Big Alma" broke through to the North Beach extraction shaft at Columbus and Powell Street in North Beach, joining "Mom Chung", which had arrived on June 2. The arrival of the TBMs marked the completion the boring operation phase. The two TBMs were to be disassembled and removed, and the extraction shaft filled in by the end of 2014. The twin tunnels were fully complete by May 2015, when Mayor Ed Lee toured the project underground. Each completed tunnel is 8,500 feet (2,600 m) long and 20 feet (6.1 m) in diameter, supported by 1,750 concrete rings placed during the boring operation.

Two of the three underground stations were constructed using cut-and-cover methods while Chinatown station was constructed with the sequential excavation method.

=== Schedule ===
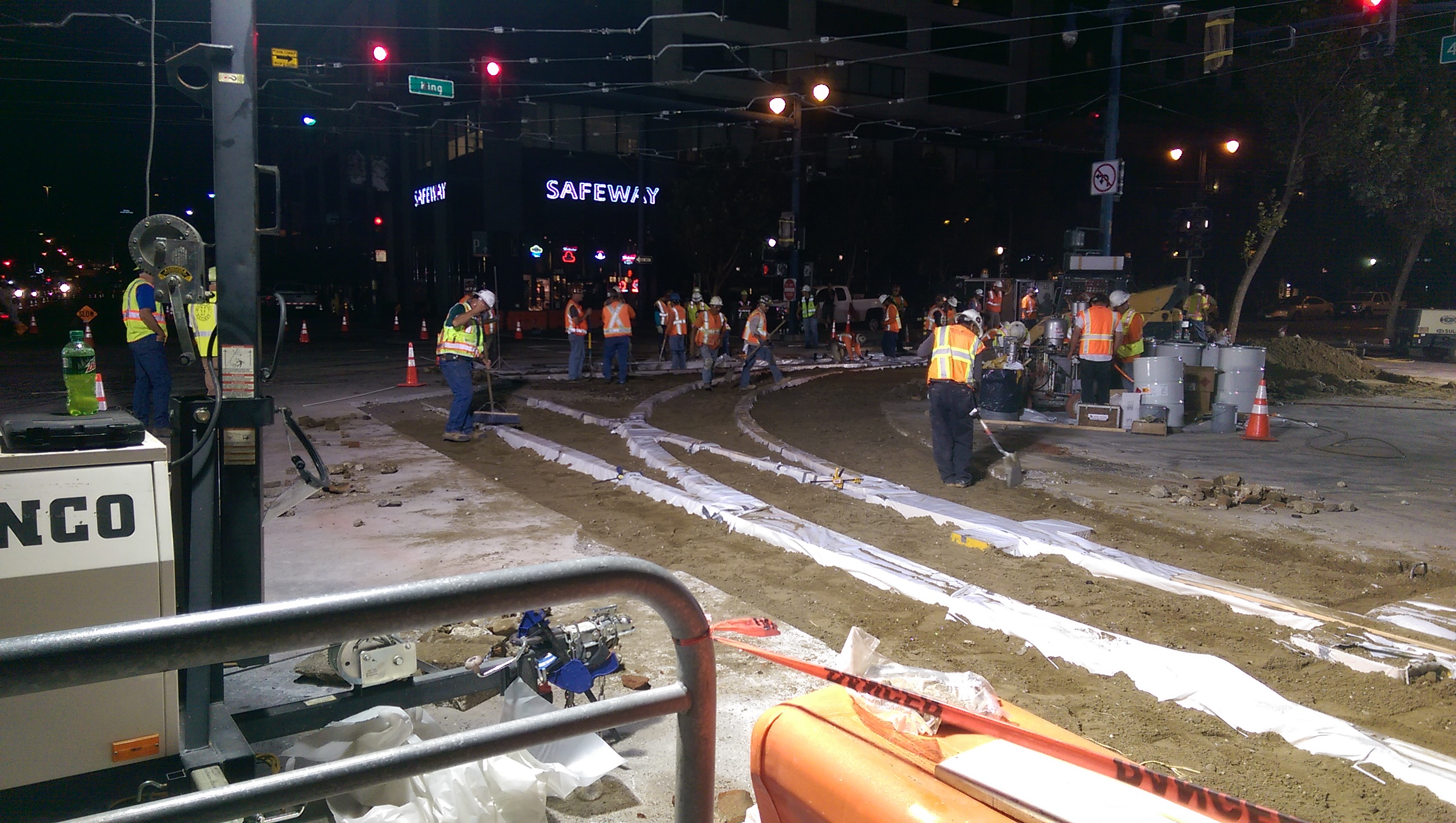
Track extension construction at 4th & King (September 5–8, 2015) as a part of the Central Subway Project

Just before construction began in 2012, the start of revenue service on the Central Subway extension was scheduled for December 2018. When the main contract was awarded to Tutor Perini in May 2013, schedule float (the amount of time set aside for delays) was reduced from 14.8 months to 5.2 months. In 2014, the San Francisco Controller's Office audited the project and predicted it would be completed on schedule in December 2018 and slightly under budget. Tunnel boring completed in June 2014, a month ahead of schedule and under budget.

Over Labor Day weekend 2015, between September 5–8, the track at the intersection of 4th Street and King Street was extended, which temporarily shortened the services of T Third Street between 4th and King station (referred to as 4th and Berry in the notice) and Sunnydale station; the K Ingleside route also ended at Embarcadero Station and did not splice with the T Third Street route. A similar shutdown was imposed in early November 2015. During the November shutdown, bus service was provided in lieu of the T-Third trains between Embarcadero and Sunnydale; E-Embarcadero service was suspended for two weekends; K-Ingleside again terminated at Embarcadero; and streets were closed in the vicinity of 4th and King.

Central Subway progress
Date		Incurred Costs		Funding (Note: Funding allocated for Central Subway Project)		Completion	
Date		$(M) (Note: Year of Expense (YOE) dollars, in millions)	% (Note: Percentage of $1,578.3 M YOE overall project budget)	$(M)	%	Date (Note: Estimated date of revenue service)	% (Note: Based on earned value analysis)
2015	Jan	747.65	47.37	1,029.79	65	Dec 2018	46.5
2015	Jul	818.77	51.88	1,029.79	65	Feb 2019	— (Note: Not calculated due to schedule realignment)
2016	Jan	893.70	56.62	1,179.79	75	May 2019	59
2016	Jul	963.51	61.05	1,179.79	75	Jul 2019	61
2017	Jan	1,025.99	65.01	1,329.79	84	Oct 2019	64.8
2017	Jul	1,094.84	69.31	1,329.79	84	Dec 2019	70.6
2018	Jan	1,178.42	74.66	1,479.79	94	Nov 2019	74.6
2018	Jul	1,232.29	78.08	1,494.00	95	Jan 2020	78.6
2019	Jan	1,305.01	82.68	1,517.99	96	Dec 2019	82.5
2019	Jul	1,374.37	87.08	1,534.05	97	Feb 2020	86.66
2020	Jan	1,488.51	94.3	1,556.74	98.7	Sep 2021	91.2
2020	Jul	1,557.53	98.7	1,578.30 (Note: Project Estimate at Completion (EAC) is $1.626 billion, a $46M overrun.)	100	Dec 2021	92.3
2021	Jan	1,696.57	100.3	1,691 (Note: Project EAC is $1.793 billion, a $215M overrun.)	100	Spr 2022	93.2
2021	Sep	1,855.17	98.1	1,877.15 (Note: Project Estimate at Completion (EAC) is $1.891 billion, a $313M overrun.)	100	Spr 2022	94.0
Notes

A Project Management Oversight Committee report released in mid-2017 reported ten months of delays in construction, pushing back the date of service as late as December 10, 2019. The $76 million contingency fund may be used to expedite completion. The delays were attributed to work on the Chinatown station. In December 2017, Tutor Perini (TPC) circulated a report predicting a fifteen-month delay past December 2019 due to circumstances beyond their control, including hard rock and required utility relocations. TPC is liable for penalties of up to $50,000 per day for late completion beyond December 2019.

Also in December 2017, the Central Subway Program Director, John Funghi, announced he would leave the project for Caltrain, where he headed the Peninsula Corridor Electrification Project starting in February 2018. In April 2018, SFMTA announced that excavation was complete for Chinatown station, which was expected to be the last station completed for the Central Subway in mid-2019. The other underground stations, Yerba Buena/Moscone and Union Square, were scheduled to be completed by the end of 2018 ahead of the then-scheduled December 2019 start of revenue service.

SFMTA noted that of 37 schedule updates submitted by Tutor Perini between December 2014 and December 2017, 21 were rejected "due to multiple and repetitive issues that vary from incorrect working sequences to unrealistic forecasted completion dates to artificially steering the schedule longest path through certain portions of the project". Contrary to TPC's claims, SFMTA stated that ground conditions were as expected from preliminary surveys, but TPC's "mining productivity has not been as planned" and directed TPC to develop a recovery schedule. In January 2018, for example, TPC modified their construction sequence at Chinatown station and were able to shave 18 days off the schedule, changing the estimated revenue service date to November 22, 2019. By May 2019, the estimated opening had slipped to February 2020. In September 2019, it was announced that the opening was delayed yet again, this time to mid-2021. Another delay to late 2021 was announced in June 2020, followed by a further delay to 2022.

In March 2021, Muni imposed a deadline for major construction to complete by March 31 as part of a settlement with TPC for work order modifications and other claims; in exchange, TPC would receive a $143 million payment. Test trains began operation in the subway in July 2021. By September 2021, construction was 98% complete. Installation of overhead line equipment at the junction with existing trackage at 4th and King took place in November 2021.

=== Other issues ===
Residents and workers near the 4th Street portal and North Beach extraction sites noted an increase in the visible number of rats after construction began.

Construction of the Union Square/Market Street station required closing Stockton Street just north of Market, which depressed traffic to retailers in Union Square. During the excavation, workers accidentally breached a water main in July 2014, causing basement-level flooding in shops along Geary between Stockton and Grant. The ensuing cleanup took several days and required a few businesses to keep stores closed. Since Stockton Street has been closed between Geary and Ellis, starting in 2014, construction is suspended in December and the area is transformed into a pedestrian plaza known as "Winter Walk". Some have called for Winter Walk to be made a permanent year-round fixture, but notable opposition included Rose Pak, who wanted to retain Stockton as a link from Market to Chinatown.

Workers breached a natural gas pipeline in May 2015 while working on the Yerba Buena/Moscone station, forcing the evacuation of the nearby Yerba Buena Center for the Arts.

=== Opening and operations ===
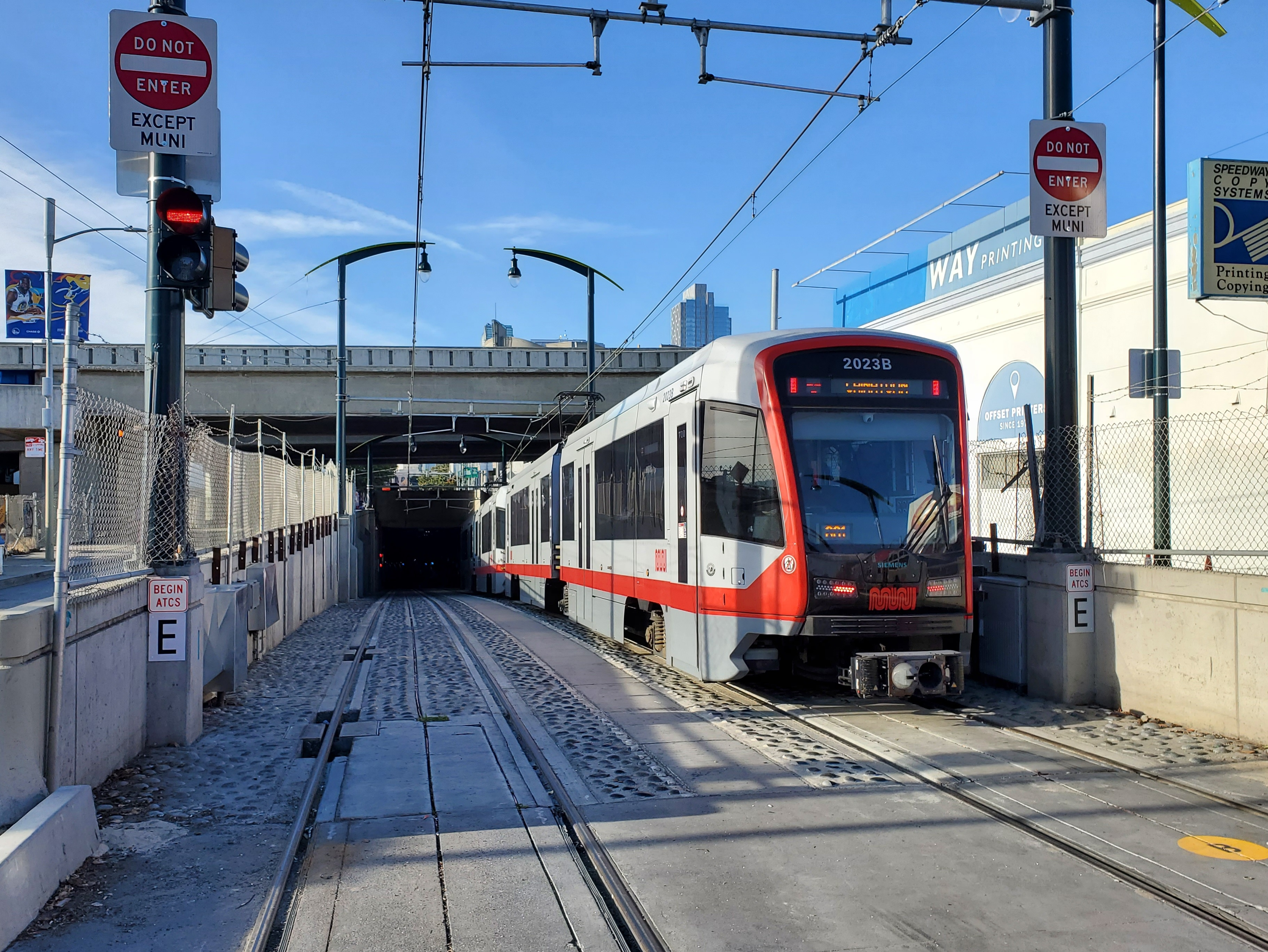
A northbound train entering the portal on the first day of public service

On September 20, 2022, the SFMTA announced that service in the Central Subway would begin on November 19, 2022. Initial service was a "soft launch", running only on weekends, while operator training continued on weekdays. This early service ran only between Chinatown station and 4th and Brannan station. The T Third Street line continued to use the Market Street subway during this period. Full service, with the T Third Street line rerouted to run through the Central Subway to Chinatown, began on January 7, 2023. Additional shuttle trains signed "S Chase Center" operate between Chinatown and UCSF/Chase Center for events at Chase Center.

Initial ridership was "tepid" – the T only saw a modest increase in ridership, while the parallel route 30 and 45 buses saw small drops. In February 2023, the three subway stations averaged 2,966 daily boardings and 4,501 daily exits. Half the ridership was at Union Square/Market Street.

The Central Subway was closed from February 26 to March 14, 2025, for water leakage mitigation at Chinatown station.

=== Art ===
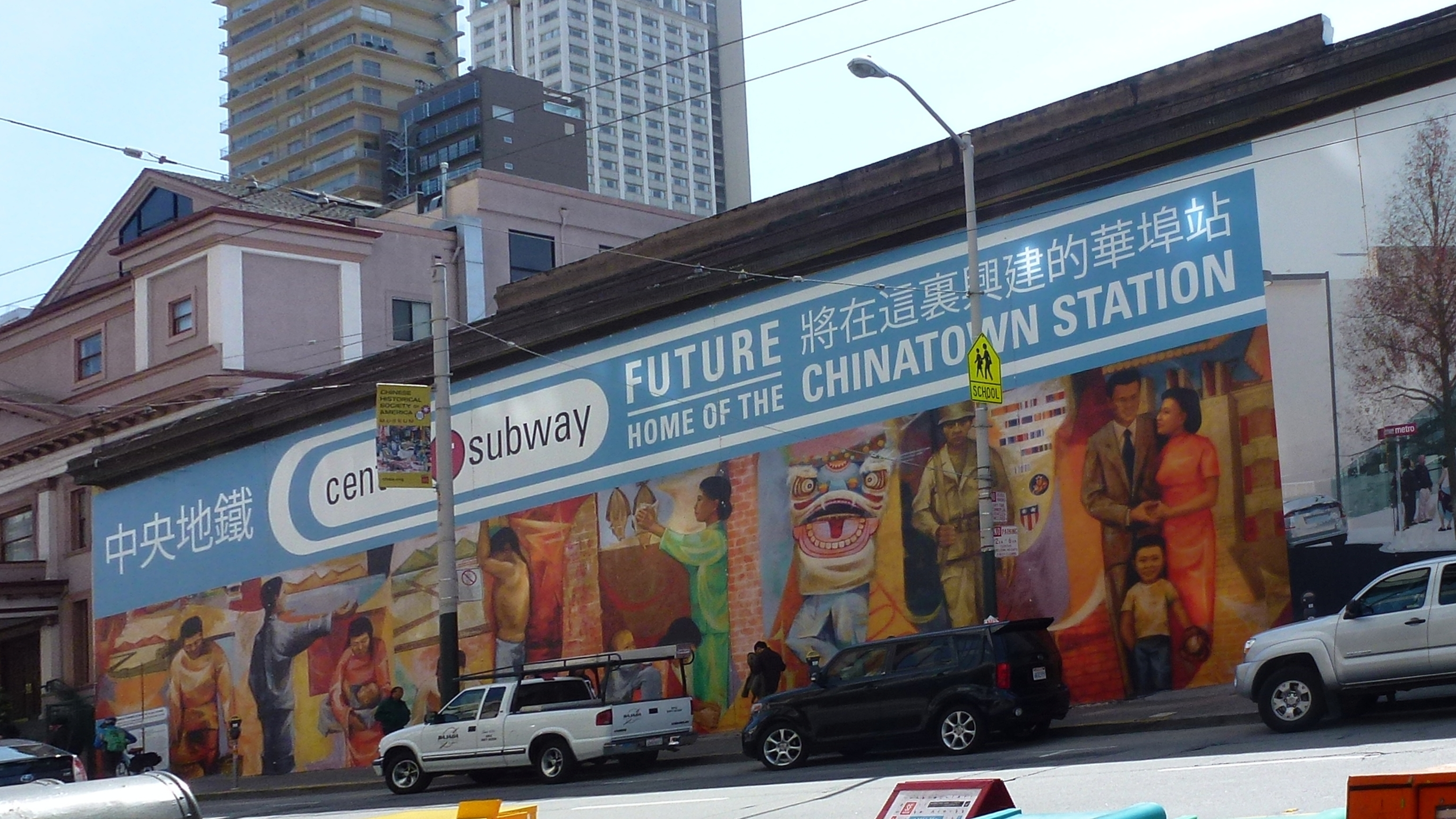
"One Hundred Years: History of the Chinese in America", temporary installation by James Leong

Ten permanent installations were built as part of the project: three at each subway station and one at 4th and Brannan. A draft of the Central Subway Arts Master Plan was presented to the San Francisco Arts Commission in September 2008. Artworks are divided into "landmark" and "wayfinding" categories. Candidates were announced in July 2010 and the winning entrants were announced that August.

Temporary artworks were also installed during construction. "One Hundred Years: History of the Chinese in America", a mural painted by James Leong originally for the Ping Yuen housing project in Chinatown, was enlarged, printed, and wrapped in 2012 around the Hogan & Vest building at Stockton & Washington, at the future Chinatown station site, prior to that building's demolition. In addition, temporary murals were painted on the construction barricades erected around the Chinatown and Yerba Buena/Moscone stations. The art was printed on adhesive vinyl and wrapped onto the plywood panels, measuring approximately 8 ft (2.4 m) high by 190 ft (58 m) long at Chinatown, along Stockton, or 160 ft (49 m) long at Yerba Buena/Moscone, along Folsom. Temporary art was also installed around the Pagoda Palace Theatre from 2014 to 2017, while it was being used to extract the two tunnel boring machines.

=== Proposed extension ===
Route for second phase (completed as the Central Subway), planned route for third phase (extension to Fisherman's Wharf), and proposed routes for fourth phase (extension to the Presidio of San Francisco). The Phase 2 tunnel runs as far as the proposed North Beach station site, but does not include the station.

A proposed third phase would build an extension beyond Chinatown, including new stations at Washington Square in North Beach and Fisherman's Wharf. In preparation, the tunnels were bored past Chinatown station, and the tunnel boring machines were extracted from the intersection of Powell and Columbus, near Washington Square.

Fourteen alternative routes were proposed in a 2014 study to extend the line, and daily ridership was projected to increase by 40,000 if the extension was completed. San Francisco Chronicle architecture critic John King wrote there was "a compelling power to the idea of an extension that, if nothing else, would make the Central Subway seem less like a boondoggle and more of a factor in the shaping of tomorrow’s city. The empty lot of the Pagoda was a starting point for dreams. Let’s see if it can become a starting point of something real as well."

The SFMTA published a concept study in January 2015 on the feasibility of several options for phase 3. The report studied three main alignments: Columbus Ave, Powell St, or a loop line on Powell St, Beach St, and Columbus Ave. Both subway and surface options were studied for each alignment. The report found that the phase 3 project could improve transit trip time by at least 50% and would increase the ridership on the T Third by 55%. Project cost estimates ranged from $440 million to $1.4 billion depending on the design. In June 2018, the SFMTA began a detailed study of possible routes to narrow down options for a future environmental impact study.

A conceptual fourth phase has been advanced by SFMTA and transit advocates to further extend the line west of Fisherman's Wharf to the Presidio. However, since the Central Subway station platforms are only long enough to accommodate two-car trains, unlike the upper deck Market Street subway platforms which can accommodate four-car LRV trains, the projected ridership increase with a fourth phase Presidio extension would require the existing stations constructed to be rebuilt to accommodate three- or four-car trains.
