= John Savage Bolles =

American architect

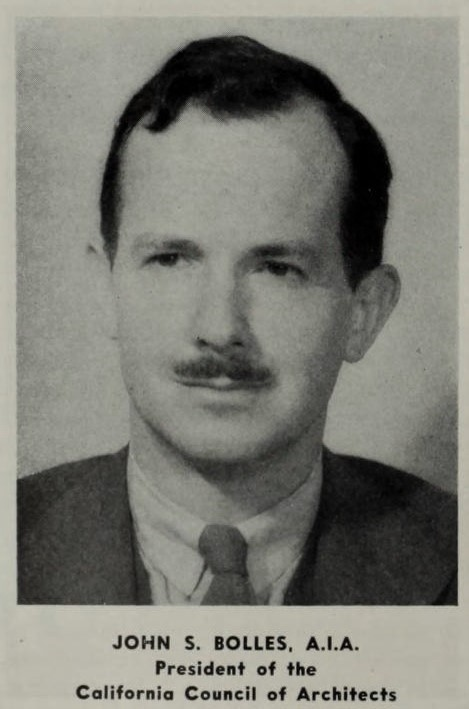
- American Architect
- Born: June 25, 1905; Berkeley, California, U.S.
- Died: March 5, 1983 (aged 77); Santa Rosa, California, U.S.
- Education: University of Oklahoma, Harvard University
- Occupation: Architect
- Spouse: Mary Van de Water Piper
- Parent: Edward Grosvenor Bolles

John Savage Bolles (June 25, 1905 – March 5, 1983) was an American architect. He was most active in San Francisco, and the designer of Candlestick Park. He was a founding partner of the architecture design firm Ward & Bolles.

== Biography ==
Born on June 25, 1905, in Berkeley, Bolles was the son of San Francisco architect Edward Grosvenor Bolles (1871–1939), who had arrived in the city in 1893. In 1926, Bolles graduated as a civil engineer from the University of Oklahoma, and graduated from Harvard University with a master's degree in architecture in 1932.

During his Harvard years he pursued archeological work at the Medinet Habu site in Egypt under Uvo Hölscher, at the Cluny Abbey in France under Kenneth John Conant, a 1929 trip to Anatolia funded by the Rockefeller Foundation, and particularly at Chichen Itza, state of Yucatán, Mexico.

In March 1935, Bolles married Mary Van de Water Piper, a Radcliffe student and daughter of William T. Piper of Piper Aircraft.

Bolles returned to San Francisco and joined his father's firm in 1936. After his father's death in 1939, Bolles began a partnership with New Zealand immigrant architect Joseph Francis (or Francisco) Ward (1898–1970) to form Ward & Bolles. They began as collaborators in 1942 on two wartime housing projects, one in Marin City and one in Oakland. From 1943 to 1945, Bolles was project engineer for the Federal Public Housing Authority for San Francisco, where he worked with fellow architect Esther Baum Born acquiring properties for housing war-industry workers. After the war, he and Ward formalized their partnership and designed a series of private houses. In 1949, he became a founding member of the Earthquake Engineering Research Institute.

In 1954 Bolles left the partnership and formed John S. Bolles Associates, which lasted until 1975 and did a variety of Bay Area commissions.

All through his career, Bolles was "a strong believer in the artistic embellishment of public buildings." For the 1939 fair he not only assisted his father, but also worked under the Spanish-American muralist Jose Moya del Pino on murals for the Temple of Religion and for the State Ballroom. Moya del Pino also painted a mural for the dining room of the Bolles residence on Lyon, and was engaged as color consultant for Bolles's Hanna School for Boys in 1952, a project which also incorporates sculpture by Ruth Cravath. Bolles insisted on integrated statuary at Candlestick Park and "often was embroiled with staid municipal officials over questions of adornment." Unfortunately Bolles was one of four designers on a committee who approved the widely derided Vaillancourt Fountain on Embarcadero Plaza.

John's son Peter joined then continued the firm beginning in the 1970s. Bolles was a member of San Francisco Urban Planning and Research, made a Fellow of the American Institute of Architects in 1963, was one-time president of the California Council of Architects, and was head of the San Francisco Art Association for many years before its dissolution in 1966.

== Candlestick Park ==
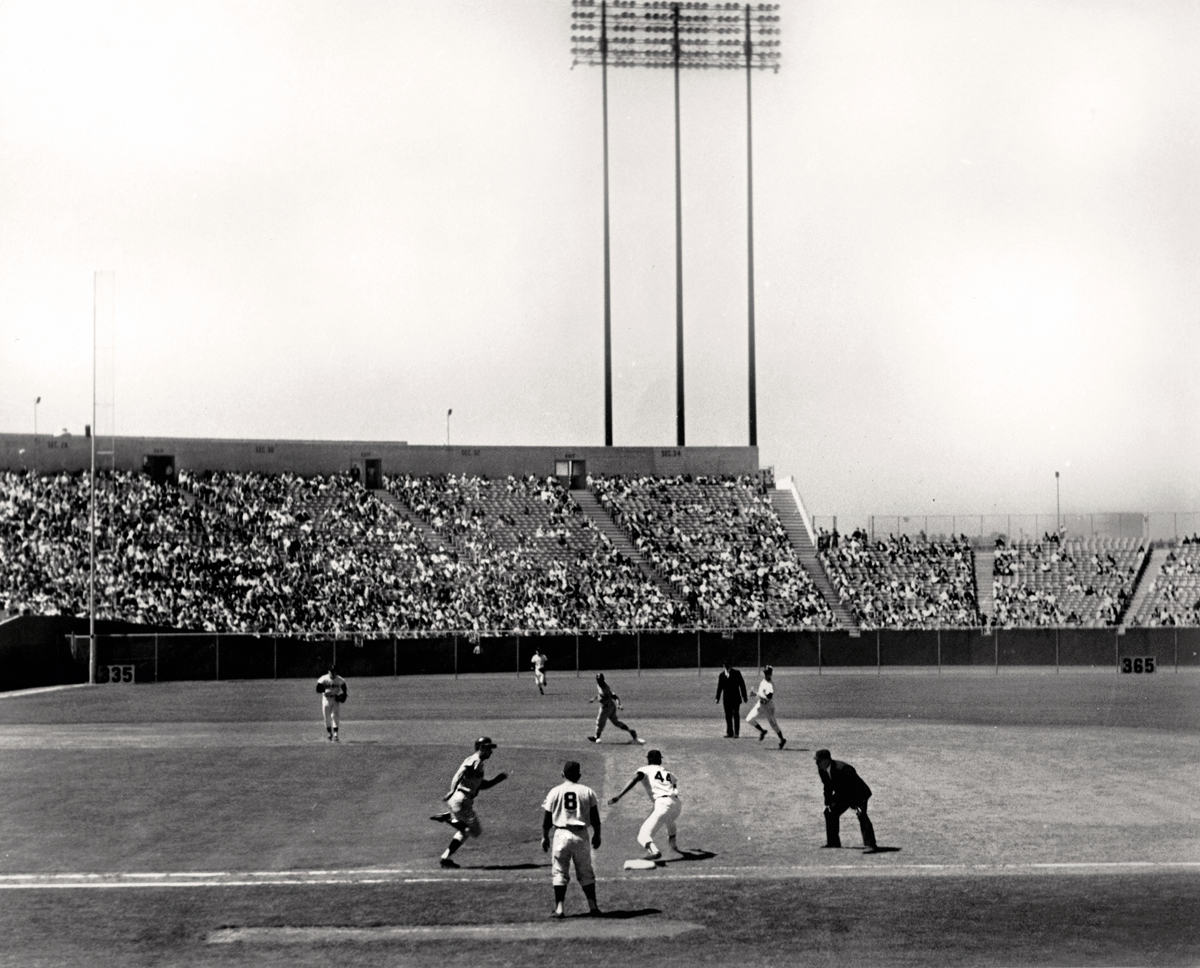
A Giants game at Candlestick, 1965

His most prominent single work, Candlestick Park stadium, was the subject of civic debate over its perceived design flaws. Its placement near the Pacific Ocean exposed players and fans to chilly temperatures, fog, dew, and particularly wind, all of which grew worse at night. Giants pitcher Stu Miller was blown off the pitcher's mound during the All Star Game of 1961. Celebrity attorney Melvin Belli sued owner Horace Stoneham and the ballclub for the return of the price of his season tickets, worth just under $1600, proceedings which were heavily reported from jury selection to his victory. Bolles had included a boomerang-shaped concrete wind baffle in the original design, reportedly reduced in construction.

After the park's expansion for the San Francisco 49ers football club in 1970, which Bolles also designed, the wind problems changed, but were no better. The architect "heard a constant chorus of insults directed at his first and only stadium." According to his son Peter, "I think Candlestick was his greatest pride and his greatest disappointment. He was thrilled to be able to do the project. But there was so much ugly press about it that I know it hurt him inside, a lot."

== Work ==
Bolles's architectural work includes:

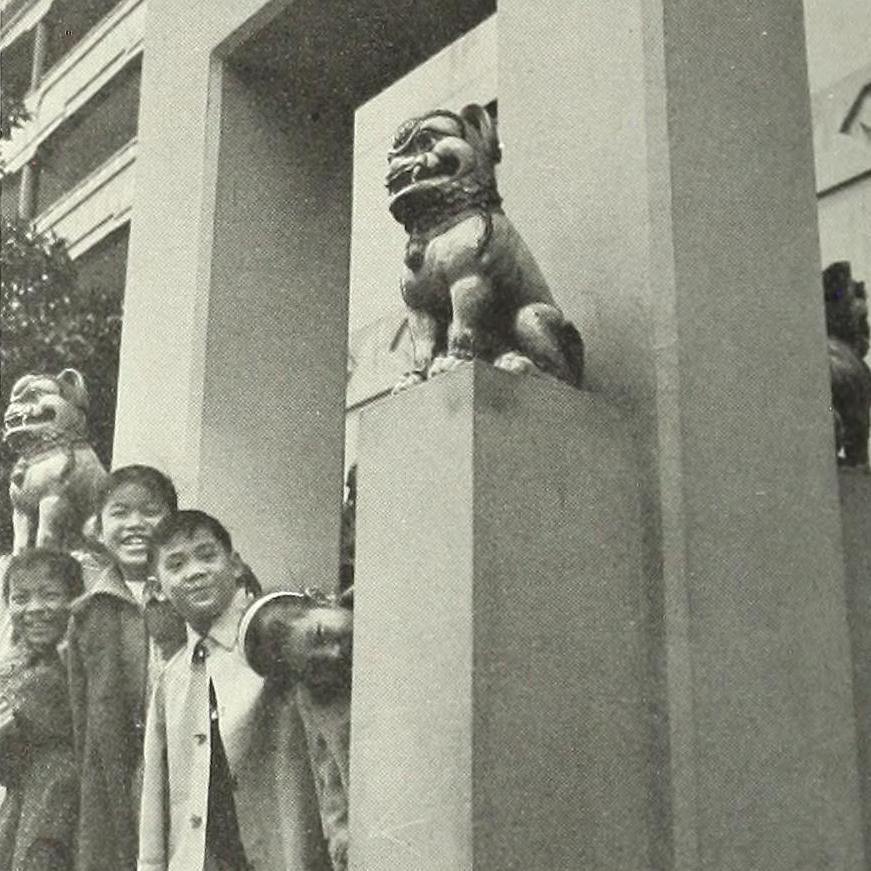
foo dogs, Pailou Gate, Ping Yuen Housing Project, c. 1952

- assisting his father, "Tower of Peace", "Temple of Religion" and the "Christian Science Monitor Building" at the Golden Gate International Exposition, Treasure Island, San Francisco (razed), 1939
- Bolls Residence, Ross, California, with landscape plan by Garrett Eckbo, 1945
- Ping Yuen Housing Project and North Ping Yuen expansion, San Francisco, with landscape architect Douglas Baylis and foo dog sculptures by Mary Erckenbrack, 1951 and 1961
- Archbishop Hanna Center for Boys, now the Archbishop Hanna High School, Boyes Springs (Sonoma), California, as Ward & Bolles and Mario Ciampi, with architectural sculpture by Ruth Cravath, 1952
- four projects for the Sperry & Hutchinson Company: South San Francisco warehouse, San Jose warehouse, San Francisco warehouse, and Oakland offices, 1954-1957
- Potrero Annex housing development, south slope of Potrero Hill, San Francisco, 1953-54
- IBM Site Plan and Building Complex, including IBM Building 25 and a campus of about 30 others, San Jose, with ground plan by landscape architect Douglas Baylis and integrated artwork by muralist Lucienne Bloch and Hydro-Gyro, a water-kinetic sculpture by Robert Boardman Howard, beginning 1957
- Paul Masson Champagne Cellars, Saratoga, California, with fountain sculpture by Gurdon Woods, 1959 (razed)
- Capilano house in Novato, California, notable example of mid-century modern residential design integrating architecture with the environment, 1963
- Candlestick Park, former home of the San Francisco Giants baseball team, 1960, renovation 1970
- McGraw-Hill Office and Distribution Center, later the Birkenstock offices and distribution center, Novato, 1962
- General Motors Fremont Assembly plant, as of 2010 the Tesla Fremont Factory, Fremont, California, 1962
- JFK Towers, 2451 Sacramento Street, San Francisco, 1966
- Moore Business Forms building, later ComputerLand headquarters, 2950 Peralta Oaks Court, Oakland, 1966
- 990 Pacific Senior Housing, San Francisco, 1969
- Bayview Branch Library of the San Francisco Public Library, Bayview–Hunters Point neighborhood, with exterior sculpture by Jacques Overhoff, 1969 (razed)
- Redevelopment Agency Building, 939 Ellis, San Francisco, 1970
- Embarcadero Plaza, San Francisco, with architects Mario Ciampi, Don Carter, and landscape architect Lawrence Halprin, 1972
- Santa Rosa Plaza, Santa Rosa, California, 1983
- Gallo Wine Headquarters Building (Modesto)
- Johnson & Johnson offices, Menlo Park
- 17 retail stores and three distribution centers across northern California for Macy's Department Stores, including
  - Bayfair Center in San Leandro
  - interiors for Hilltop Mall in Richmond, Hillsdale Shopping Center in San Mateo, and Valley Fair in San Jose
  - interior for the renovation of the Macy's Union Square San Francisco flagship store

== Published works ==
- 1977: Las Monjas, A Major Pre-Mexican Architectural Complex at Chichen Itza, University of Oklahoma Press, ISBN 0-8061-1282-4, ISBN 978-0-8061-1282-4
