= Jake Lee (painter) =

Chinese-American watercolor painter

Jake Lee (1915–1991) was a Chinese American watercolor painter. His work reflected the simple subjects of buildings and animals to Chinese immigrants, and the political and cultural aspects.

== Bibliography ==
Jake Lee was a Chinese American artist born in 1915 and died in 1991. He was a watercolor painter who also worked with gouache. He lived in Monterey, California, but as he developed as an artist, this was not only in this location. Lee's subject matter primarily featured the natural environment. His landscape paintings are simple in concept, but the color shows excellent detail. Lee also featured a visual history of the life of Chinese immigrant labor in California. Jake Lee was also an illustrator of children's books during his lifetime.

== Education ==
Jake Lee was a student at the Otis College of Art and Design in Los Angeles, California, and San Jose State University in California. Jake Lee worked under artist Don Kingman, who greatly influenced his work.

== Artworks ==
- 1956; watercolor: "Laborers Working on Central Pacific Railroad"
- 1956: watercolor: 'Immigrants Disembarking Ship"
- 1956; watercolor: "Chinese New Year Celebration"
- 1956; watercolor: "Chinese Opera House, San Francisco."
- 1956: watercolor: "Pig Roasting in Nevada City"
- 1956: watercolor: "Shoemakers in Massachusetts,1870"
- 1956: watercolor: "Shrimp Camp At China Camp"
- 1956: watercolor: "Miners in Mother Lode Country"
- 1956: Watercolor: "Lantern Making in San Francisco"
- 1956: watercolor: "Cigar Makers In San Francisco"
- 1956: watercolor: "Vineyard Workers in Sonoma County"
- 1956: watercolor: '"Champion Firehouse Team of Deadwood, South Dakota, 1888"
- 1915-1991: watercolor and pencil on paper under glass: "Horse in a corral", 13.5" H X20" W
- 1915-1991: Watercolor: "Fulton ST., New York," 10.5"h x 12.25"w
- 1915-1991: Watercolor: " Coastal California Landscape," 14.5 x 21 inches.
- 1915-1991: Watercolor: "Rural Scene," 5" x 8 1/2"
- 1915-1991: Watercolor on paper: "Chinese Market," 39 x 29 1/4inches sight

== Exhibitions ==
Jake Lee did a 12-piece for a restaurant to show the progression of Chinese American history in 1959. After the restaurant closed in 1972, the paintings disappeared until 2010, when the Chinese Historical Society of America purchased them from an auction and left them there in San Francisco.

In addition to the now-famous location of his Chinese American history paintings in San Francisco, Jake Lee is showcased at the Chinese American Museum of Los Angeles. The exhibition was called Sunshine and Shadow: In Search of Jake Lee. It was displayed from November 30, 2007, through April 13, 2008. Some pieces on display included Garage Sale, Olvera Street, and Old Spanish Light.

== Collections ==
The collection, based on artwork from Kan's restaurant, is held in the Chinese Historical Society of America in San Francisco, California. The artwork displayed at the time was based on the contribution and culture of Chinese immigrants to America in the 1800s. One of the collections was the Sunshine and Shadow for the Chinese American Museum of Los Angeles. It was based on the light against shadow on the "most mundane subjects."

== Publications ==
One of the publications was a children's book. It was titled Farewell, Sweet Princess. This book was in watercolor and was published in 1953. It was a work done with another artist named Jesse Marsh. Jake Lee was published through the Westways Magazine and made 30 paintings for Ford Times. For Westways Magazine, Jake Lee contributed pieces from the 1950s to 2007.
