= One Hundred Years: History of the Chinese in America =

Mural by James Leong in San Francisco, California

- Artist: James Leong
- Year: 1952
- Type: Egg tempera and casein on masonite
- Dimensions: 154 cm × 533.4 cm (60 in × 210 in)
- Location: Chinese Historical Society of America; San Francisco, California

One Hundred Years: History of the Chinese in America is a 1952 mural painting by James Leong.

== Background and development ==
Ping Yuen & CHSA
1 北平園, North Ping Yuen (838 Pacific)
2 西平園, West Ping Yuen (895 Pacific)
3 中平園, Central Ping Yuen (711 & 795 Pacific)
4 東平園, East Ping Yuen (655 Pacific)
5 Chinese Historical Society of America

H.K. Wong, a prominent businessman in San Francisco Chinatown, asked Leong to create a mural that would be representative of Chinese American history. This mural was to be placed at the then newly erected Ping Yuen Housing Project, the first federally funded housing project in Chinatown along Pacific Avenue near Stockton Street. At the time in the early 1950s, American troops were stationed in North Korea fighting against Chinese forces, and China turned into a Communist nation. Because of this, Asian Americans were constantly under scrutiny and looked at as suspect, dangerous, and communist. The San Francisco Chinatown community recognized the hypersensitivity of this time, and they believed that the mural would help create a better understanding of Chinese Americans and help outreach to a broader public who in turn could become educated about the Chinese American diaspora. Leong completed the mural in 1952.

== About the painting ==
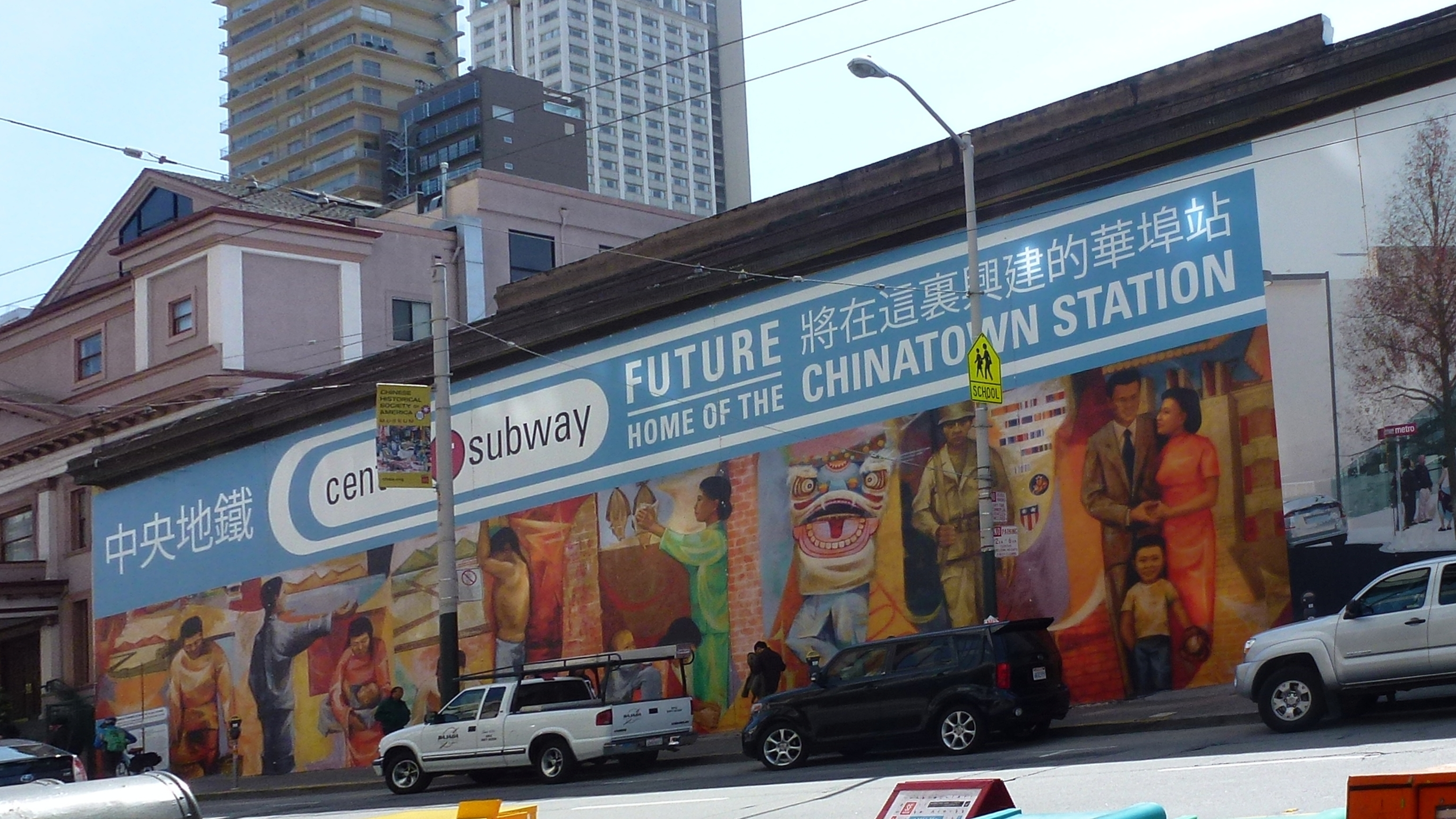
One Hundred Years: History of the Chinese in America, enlargement as a temporary installation at the Chinatown station construction site (2012)

=== Painting style ===
Painted on seven masonite panels with egg tempera and casein, One Hundred Years: History of the Chinese in America stands at an impressive 5 by 17.5 ft (1.5 by 5.3 m). Leong used bold and vibrant colors on the mural and employed curves in order to provide a fluid transition from panel to panel. The symbolism in the mural also helps create flow and connectivity. The mountains, which represent the hope and promise of a new land, connect the first three panels, while the brick walls, which signify exclusion, link the last four panels together. Whether standing or kneeling, all the figures in the mural are active.

=== Themes and symbolism ===
The first panel depicts two rice paddy workers and a farmer carrying water, while the Great Wall of China stands in the background. Leong portrays these Cantonese workers, with broad noses and high cheekbones, bending over in order to accomplish their backbreaking labor. The imagery of the Great Wall represents the home country and origins of the Chinese people. The majestic dragon that snakes along the top of the first panel is representative of China—powerful, magical and eternal. This symbol of strength and longevity watches over the Cantonese workers, who struggle yet persevere throughout famine, flood and foreign conquerors.

In the second panel, a Chinese man clad in a blue outfit points to the promise of America and the Gold Mountain. He leaves his wife and child behind. The red square of communism is looming in the background of the somber family.

The third panel depicts a man toiling on the Transcontinental Railroad while another man mines for gold. Here, the Chinese man has finally reached the Gold Mountain, located in the grassy hills of California. The railroad worker stands swinging a pickaxe. The clear display of his queue running down his back shows off his Chinese-ness and devotion to the emperor in China. Like his counterpart in the second panel, the railroad worker wears blue pants, but unlike the former’s thick cotton, the railroad man opts for America’s sturdy blue denim. A hybrid of long pigtails and blue jeans, this worker represents the transitioning of the Chinese in America.

In the fourth panel, a woman in green is sitting and picking fish with her baby slung in a pouch around her back. Another woman in red stands beside her and is drying fish. This panel represents the coming of Chinese women to America. Some came as wives. Some were given false hopes of a better life and working conditions, but upon arrival were forced into domestic servitude or prostitution. These women were indentured for many years before they could pay off their passage over. One woman wears a jade green outfit for prosperity, while the other wears red for good fortune. The baby sits in a blue sling, the same denim blue as the railroad laborer. Rust red brick walls, encasing the women in this panel, depicts the exclusion, as well as protection, of Chinese men. Although the Chinese women go on to settle and create families, they do so within the confines of these red brick walls.

The fifth panel shows a Chinese person dancing the traditional lion dance. The large lion’s head is proudly gleaming towards the audience in a burst of blues, pinks, and whites. With the celebration of Chinese New Year, the lion dance represents prosperity and the arrival of new jobs and new lives.

A Chinese American soldier marches on in the sixth panel. A more somber panel than the former five panels in terms of color and character, this panel portrays the soldier staring downcast with a rifle slung around his back and an assortment of ribbons held in suspension to his left as he returns from World War II. When World War II first began, Chinese Americans enlisted in the Armed Services. The ribbons, which represent the Chinese American’s service in the Armed Forces, hang honorably in front of a white background and portray his success in fighting for a previously all-white America. The soldier walks and steps on paper names, symbolizing the American law of 1962 that allowed for Chinese Americans to remain as American citizens. The brick wall imagery from the fourth panel returns as the soldier marches past the restrictive wall that previously posed as an obstacle.

Leong depicts an assimilated Chinese American family in the seventh and final panel–the father in suit and tie, the mother in traditional Chinese cheongsam, and the young boy in T-shirt and blue denim. The son happily clutches a baseball and mitt. The housing commission wanted the last panel to conclude with a Hollywood happy ending, and Leong succeeded in doing just that. Leong models the family after classic Hollywood cinema stars: the mother as Greer Garson and the father as a composite of Billy Batson and Captain Marvel. The young boy, on the other hand, was modeled after Russell Leong, who has gone on to serve as a professor of English and Asian American studies at the University of California, Los Angeles. This family fusion of Chinese and America stands on a brick pathway as the grand structure of Ping Yuen is set in the background. The brick, once representative of struggle and confinement, now is laid as the pathway to the future of the Chinese American family. Ping Yuen served as a steppingstone and symbol of hope for new Chinese immigrants to America. The housing structures’ bold blue pagoda roofs and red colonnades smile over the Chinese American family, while the golden sun provides a burst of warmth for the family’s happy ending.

== Reception ==
The Chinese community’s reception to One Hundred Years: History of the Chinese in America initially was controversial. Although many elements of the painting were historically correct, the Chinatown community rejected Leong’s mural. While some believed the depiction of the characters in the mural to be too Chinese, others found the subjects to be too American. The sad faces of the subjects, the Chinese men with queues, and the Chinese women picking shrimp with infants on their backs proved to be an all-too truthful look into the Chinese American past. On the other hand, the non-Chinese community embraced the painting and saw the piece as a breakthrough of historical depiction. As Asian American awareness picked up in the 1960s at places like San Francisco State University, many saw Leong’s mural to be an example of "Uncle Tomming”, or the participation of the Chinese in their own oppression within America. Adding to the controversy at the height of the McCarthy era, the FBI, Kuomintang, and Chinese Communist Party suspected Leong to have hidden secret messages within his mural.

No conspiracy was ever proven, but such aggressive political oppression and the backlash of the Chinese community further drove Leong’s motivations to continue his artwork outside of San Francisco. In 1978, Leong discovered that his painting had been moved to Ping Yuen’s recreational room, where it suffered under time and ignorance. The historic mural was propped up on chairs in the recreational room, children had hit ping-pong balls against it, and soda and food were spilled on the painting. Leong’s mural sat quietly in Ping Yuen’s recreational room until the late 1990s, when the Chinese Historical Society of America acquired the painting. In 2000, James Leong meticulously restored the painting to its previous vibrancy. As of November 13, 2001, One Hundred Years: History of the Chinese in America hangs in the Chinese Historical Society of America’s Museum and Learning Center.

In 2012, a replica of the mural was installed on the Hogan & Vest building at 933–949 Stockton before it was demolished to make way for Chinatown station as part of the Central Subway project to extend Muni Metro to Chinatown.
