= Ping Yuen =

Public housing complex in San Francisco, California, US

- 平園
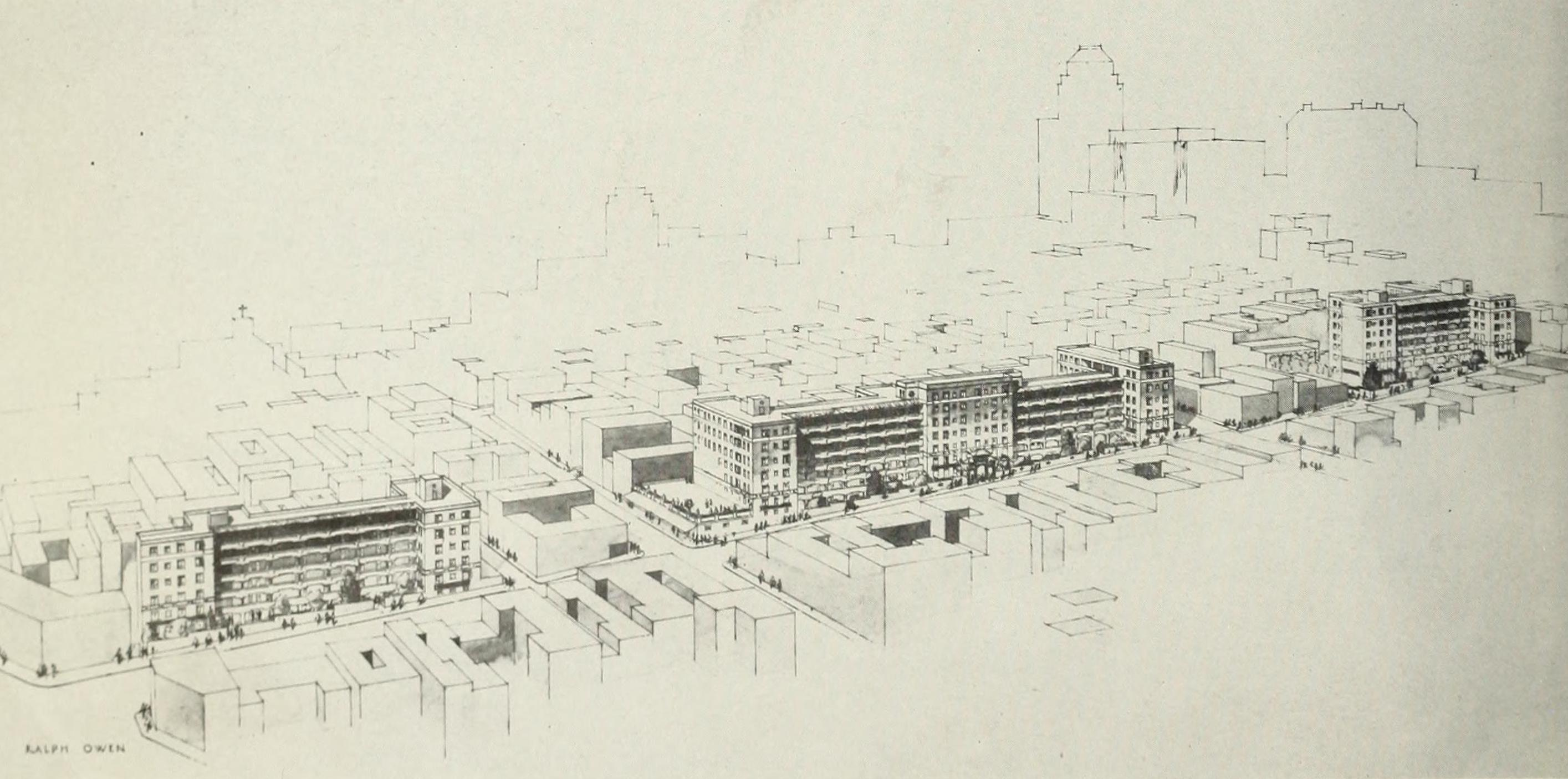
- Rendering of the Pacific Avenue facades of the three original Pings by Ralph Owen. L–R: East, Central, and West Ping Yuen.
- Interactive map of the Ping Yuen area
- Alternative names: 北平園, North Ping Yuen; 西平園, West Ping Yuen; 中平園, Central Ping Yuen; 東平園, East Ping Yuen

General information
- Location: Chinatown, Pacific Avenue: 655 (East); 711–795 (Central); 838 (North); 895 (West), San Francisco
- Coordinates: 37.7968°N 122.4062°W
- Opened: October 21, 1951
- Renovated: October 29, 1961

Design and construction
- Architect: John Bolles (PY, NPY); Ernest Born (NPY); Mark Daniels (PY); Henry Howard (PY); Joseph Ward (PY); Douglas Baylis (landscape, PY & NPY)
- Architecture firm: Ward & Bolles
- Main contractor: Theo. G. Meyer & Sons (1951); Cahill (1961)

Ping Yuen and North Ping Yuen (sometimes collectively called The Pings) form a four-building public housing complex in the north end of Chinatown, San Francisco along Pacific Avenue. In total, there are 434 apartments. The three Pings on the south side of Pacific (West, Central, and East Ping Yuen) were dedicated in 1951, and the North Ping Yuen building followed a decade later in 1961. Some of the largest murals in Chinatown are painted on Ping Yuen, which are prominent landmark buildings taller than the typical two- or three-story Chinatown buildings that date back to the early 1900s.

The formal effort to build Ping Yuen started in 1939 after Chinatown was called "the worst [slum] in the world"; it was the first public housing project completed in the neighborhood, and unlike the typical single room occupancy housing of Chinatown, featured private bathrooms and kitchens for each apartment when the first building opened in 1951. Like most buildings in Chinatown, it was designed by western architects with Chinese thematic elements.

Although it was touted as potentially drawing more tourists to the area, it soon became known as a dangerous place, with the July 4 shooting over fireworks sales that occurred at Ping Yuen leading to the Golden Dragon massacre of 1977. The murder of Julia Wong in 1978 inspired residents to go on a rent strike, led by future mayor Ed Lee, for improvements to building maintenance and security. Ownership of Ping Yuen passed from the city to the Chinatown Community Development Center in 2016, which is continuing to work with residents' associations to improve conditions.

== History ==
In 1893, the San Francisco Call confidently bragged that according to an agent from the United States Department of Labor, there were no slums in the city. Although Chinatown was mentioned as a notable exception, the "unsavory, unsightly quarter" was thought to be "rapidly growing smaller and may finally reach the vanishing point" as immigration had been throttled by the Chinese Exclusion Act of 1882. By 1896, banks had stopped lending money to Chinatown residents, and the San Francisco plague of 1900–1904 dealt another blow to the population. The San Jose Herald described Chinatown as "a foul, spreading ulcer in the center of San Francisco" and encouraged its complete removal, even though a medical investigator hired by the Call concluded "there is not the remotest danger of contagion in San Francisco if the proper radical measures recommended are carried out. ... You must not make an excuse to clean the spot because there is plague here, but you must act solely on the ground that the district is in a filthy condition". By 1904, parts of Chinatown were being demolished to improve sanitation.

However, the 1906 San Francisco earthquake and fire destroyed immigration records, resulting in the immigration of paper sons and daughters: many Chinese American residents of San Francisco claimed to have been born in the city to gain citizenship under the Fourteenth Amendment; their offspring would then be citizens as well. Numerous emigrants from China purchased papers attesting they had an American citizen as a parent. At the same time, Chinatown was rebuilt but remained geographically limited by restrictive racial covenants that prevented Chinese residents from purchasing or renting outside its boundaries; the transformation from what used to be a largely bachelor society of Chinese laborers through the immigration of women and the growth of families, combined with the hard borders of Chinatown, meant the population and density grew steadily through the early 20th century.

=== Development and construction ===
Ping Yuen & CHSA
1 北平園, North Ping Yuen (838 Pacific)
2 西平園, West Ping Yuen (895 Pacific)
3 中平園, Central Ping Yuen (711–795 Pacific)
4 東平園, East Ping Yuen (655 Pacific)
5 Chinese Historical Society of America
6 Mei Lun Yuen (945 Sacramento)

Local activists in Chinatown petitioned Congress to pass the Housing Act of 1937, hoping to build interest in better housing for their neighborhood, but since that act empowered city officials to select project sites, the San Francisco Housing Authority (SFHA) continued to ignore requests from Chinese Americans. However, starting in 1938, support from prominent officials (including SFHA commissioner Alice Griffith) began to build, and a location was proposed in Hunters Point, although that site was unacceptable due to its distance and poor transit connections. An even more prominent supporter would soon emerge: Following her visit to San Francisco and Chinatown in March 1938 and another guided tour in April 1939, conducted by Dr. Theodore C. Lee and members of the Chinese Chamber of Commerce, First Lady Eleanor Roosevelt was given a report entitled "Living Conditions in Chinatown" in July 1939, which detailed the challenges to everyday life in Chinatown and led her to push for funds to improve housing in the area. The report said that Chinatown was "a slum, a confined area largely unfit for human habitation ... [and] comparable to the worst in the world." The San Francisco Junior Chamber of Commerce announced they would perform an independent study, which was published in October 1939 and largely confirmed the earlier report's findings.

At the time, Chinatown had the highest rates of tuberculosis in San Francisco, and one of the arguments used to advocate for the new housing was again to prevent the spread of the disease by alleviating crowded conditions in Chinatown, which had been a target of public health officials in the city since the 1870s. President Roosevelt signed the Chinatown Housing Bill on October 30, 1939, providing almost $1.4 million to build new housing for Chinatown.

Although federal funding had been approved, the unnamed project (then known as Cal-1-15) was unable to proceed, as the cost of land exceeded guidelines; the San Francisco Board of Supervisors passed Resolution No. 852 on March 4, 1940, pledging to support the nascent project with $75,000 in local funds. This was approximately 1/3 of the projected amount in excess of the guidelines; the United States Housing Authority had previously agreed to cover the remainder. Dr. Theodore C. Lee, a dentist practicing in Chinatown and head of the Chinese American Citizens Alliance, worked to secure support for the housing project and was selected to the Chinese Advisory Committee which helped in the development of the project. In February 1941, a brief news item gave notice the $1.5 million project had been approved. In its annual report that year, the SFHA stated they had 70% of the land under option.

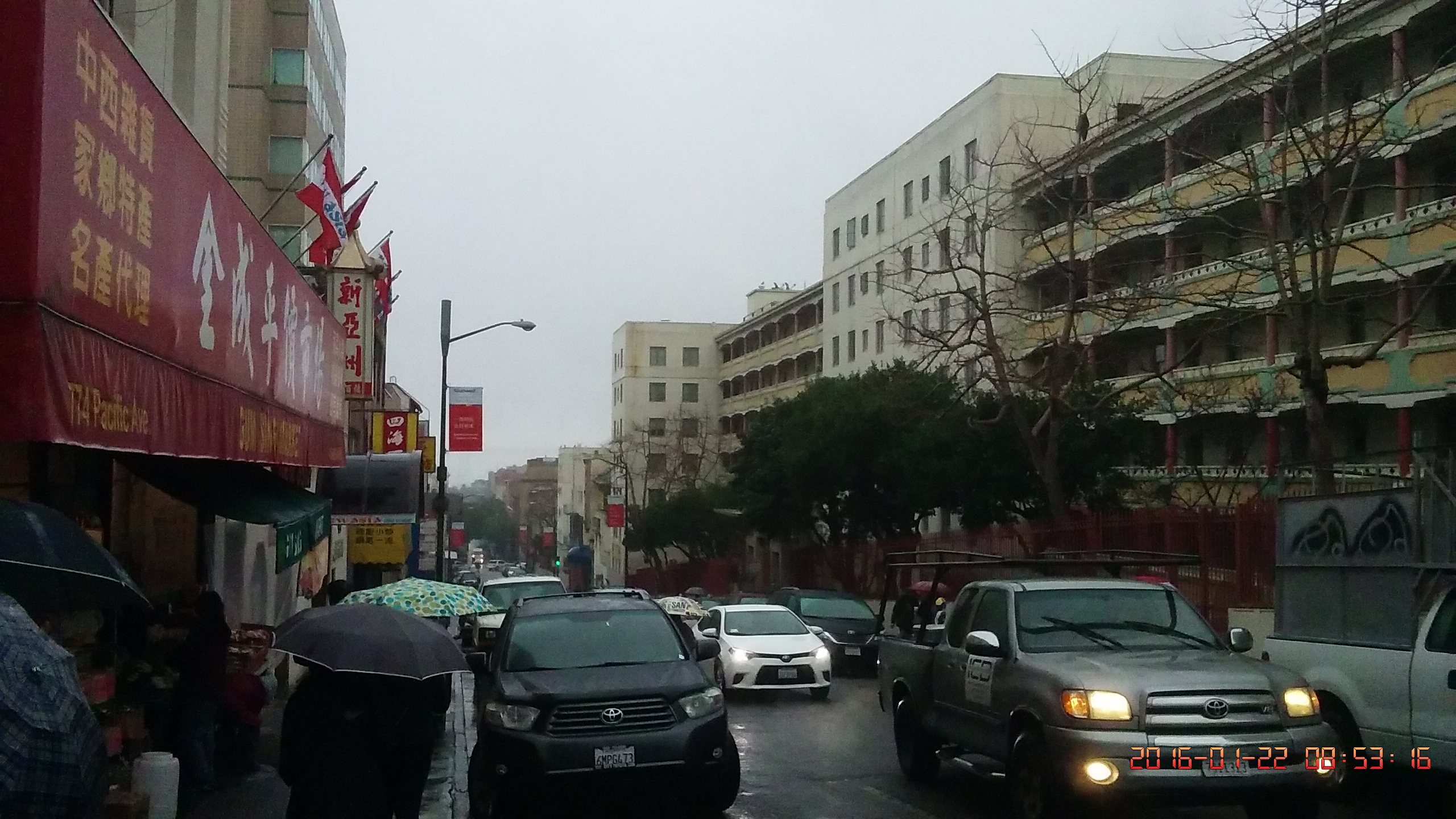
Central Ping Yuen, viewed east along Pacific (2016)

The name Ping Yuen (Chinese: 平園; pinyin: Píng Yuán; Jyutping: Ping4 Jyun4; lit. 'Peaceful' or 'Tranquil Gardens') for the new three-building project was announced on January 15, 1942, by Albert J. Evers, Executive Director of the SFHA. Ping Yuen was derived from the Chinese translation of "Pacific Terrace" and had been chosen in consultation with the local Chinese Advisory Committee. The Housing Authority commission stipulated that the Chinese characters would be used to decorate the buildings. At that point, the project was estimated to cost US$1,517,000 (equivalent to $29,890,000 in 2025) and was planned to add 232 units of subsidized family housing. It was billed as the first Chinese public housing development. However, after the United States joined World War II, further development was limited to necessary projects, and further work on Ping Yuen was suspended for the duration of the war, after the site had been acquired and plans were completed.

By March 1945, the SFHA announced that Ping Yuen would be "one of the first projects [to remove] slum buildings in Chinatown". Federal approval for Ping Yuen was granted in December 1949 as the first project west of Chicago to proceed under the Housing Act of 1949. The first contract was let immediately to Angus McLeod to demolish the existing buildings on the 2.6-acre (1.1 ha) site; one of the buildings to be demolished, at Grant and Pacific, was the Yerba Buena Building, originally completed in 1846. By that time, the three-building project was scheduled to complete on November 28, 1951, at a cost of $3.4 million. Bidding for the construction contract was opened in late May 1950, and the construction contract was awarded to Theodore G. Meyer and Sons in early August. Central Ping Yuen was the first building to be completed and was dedicated in a ceremony held on October 21, 1951. East and West Ping Yuen followed and were completed by 1956.

When Ping Yuen opened, it also included the North East Health Center (NEHC), a community health clinic operated by the San Francisco Department of Public Health. NEHC was at 799 Pacific on the ground floor of Central Ping Yuen, serving the Chinatown, Russian Hill, and North Beach neighborhoods. The clinic moved one block northwest to a new building at the eastern portal of the Broadway Tunnel and was renamed the Chinatown-North Beach Health Center in 1970. Anna Yuke Lee, the wife of Dr. Theodore C. Lee, was the first manager of Ping Yuen.

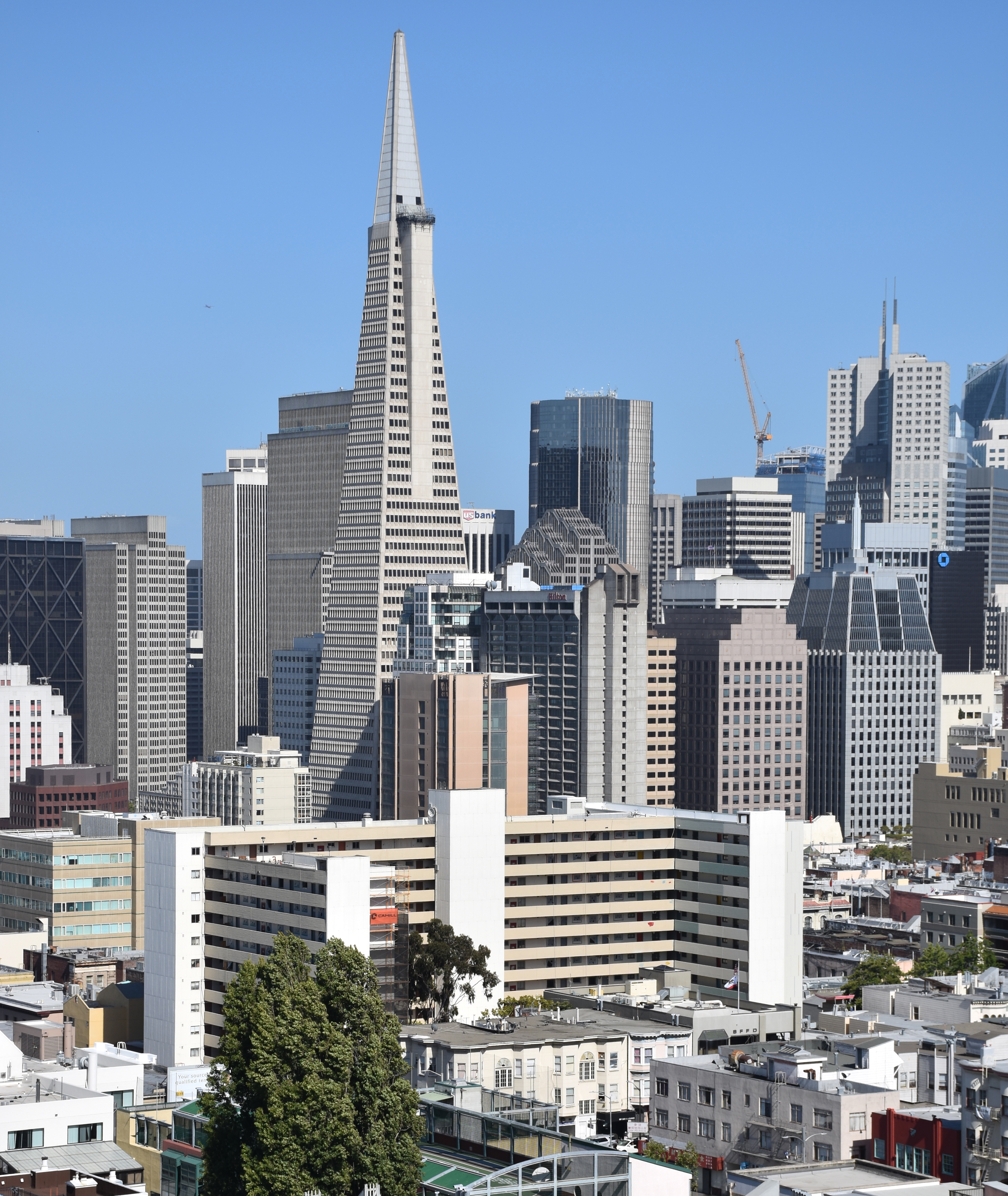
San Francisco skyline from Ina Coolbrith Park, with North Ping Yuen in the foreground (2018)

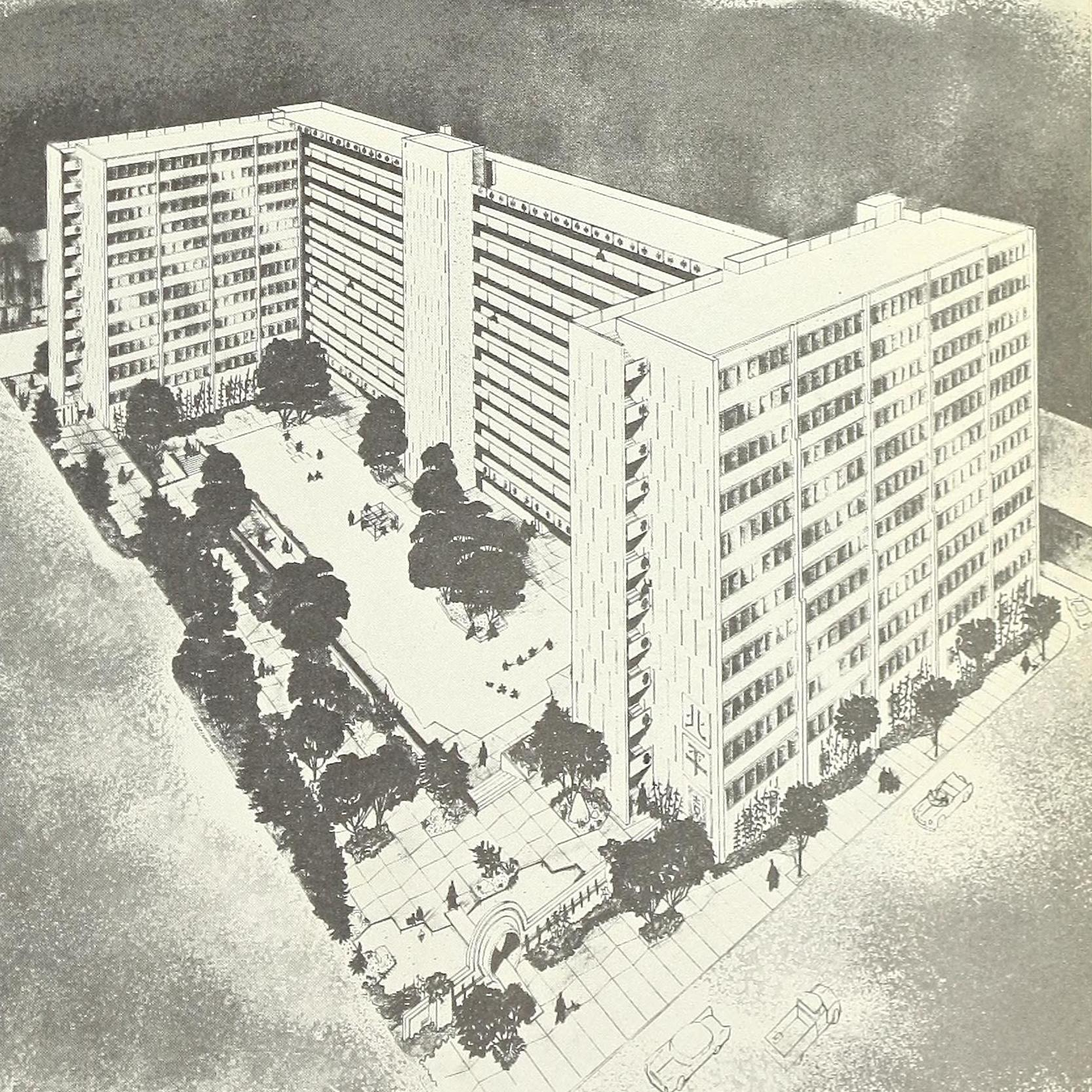
Architectural sketch of North Ping Yuen (c.1960)

A site was chosen for an expansion by 1956, tentatively named Ping Yuen Annex, but the cost to acquire the land exceeded the allowable formula for the number of housing units that would be built. The Annex project was expanded and ground was broken on February 2, 1960, during Chinese New Year festivities in a ceremony attended by Mayor George Christopher and Miss Chinatown USA Carole Ng. The Annex would add 194 units at an estimated cost of $2.3 million; the prime contractor for the Annex was Cahill. North Ping Yuen was dedicated on October 29, 1961.

Demand for housing at the Pings was high; by June 1968, the SFHA indicated that 778 families classified as 'other' races (97% of these were estimated to be Chinese) were on the wait list for an open apartment. Additional low-income/senior housing was approved in 1977 as the Mei Lun Yuen project by the San Francisco Planning Commission, to be built near the corner of Stockton and Sacramento. The project had been in planning since at least 1974.

=== Crime ===
Shortly after completion, Ping Yuen was touted as "a development that is now an added attraction to this colorful section of the City." However, it soon gained a notorious reputation as dangerous place, with inadequate lighting and security.

A shootout at Ping Yuen between rival youth gangs (part of the continuing feud between the Wah Ching and the Joe Boys) on July 4, 1977, over the sale of illegal fireworks left one Joe Boy dead and two wounded. One of those wounded, Melvin Yu, was one of the three gunmen who participated in the Golden Dragon massacre two months later on September 4.

The next year, during the night of August 23, 1978, Julia Wong, a 19-year old resident of North Ping Yuen, was raped and murdered. Returning from her shift late at night, she was attacked in a darkened stairway; Wong had been forced to use the stairway because the elevators were not working. The killer threw Wong off a balcony to the courtyard below, but she survived, so he dragged her back up and threw her off again. After Wong was killed, the SFHA installed a vandalproof panel in the elevator she would have used, but refused to similarly upgrade any of the other elevators.

=== Rent strike ===
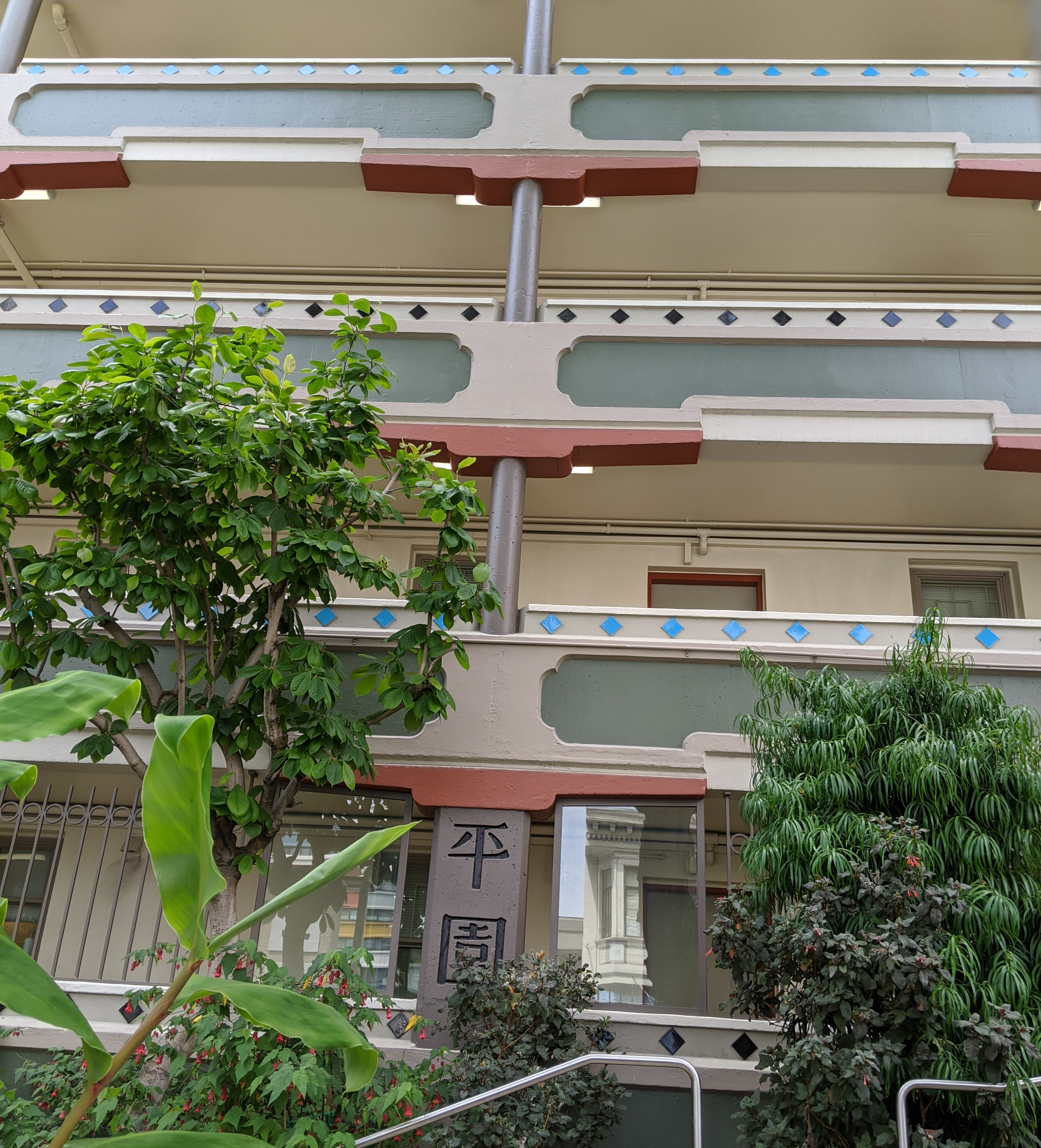
West Ping Yuen facade (2020)

The Ping Yuen Residents Improvement Association was founded in 1966 to advocate for tenants. The threat of a prior rent strike in 1977 had successfully resulted in boiler repairs, and Ping Yuen residents started a rent strike on October 1, 1978, to protest the poor repair and security conditions that had contributed to Wong's murder; striking residents were represented by public housing advocate and future Mayor Ed Lee of the Asian Law Caucus. Approximately 200 families took part in the rent strike. Lee, then characterized as "angry, rebellious", and a communist, convinced residents to pay their rent into an escrow holding account which was withheld from the SFHA for several months until the residents' demands were met, and the rent strike ended in January 1979. John Molinari, who represented Chinatown-North Beach on the San Francisco Board of Supervisors mediated the dispute. Other SFHA properties would follow suit with rent strikes to improve conditions in their buildings, bolstered by the success of the Ping Yuen rent strike.

=== Later reforms ===
The SFHA first celebrated the Lunar New Year in 1993. After Julie Lee, a real estate investor, was appointed to the SFHA Commission in 1999, residents of Ping Yuen protested, saying that Lee was more interested in replacing Ping Yuen than fixing issues. Lee's response was that her earlier remarks had been taken out of context; the city confirmed there were no plans to replace the Pings. She was later accused of diverting state funds that had been intended to build a community resource center into Kevin Shelley's campaign during his successful 2002 run for California Secretary of State, and resigned as President of the SFHA Commission in 2005; Lee later was sentenced to a year in prison for the diversion.

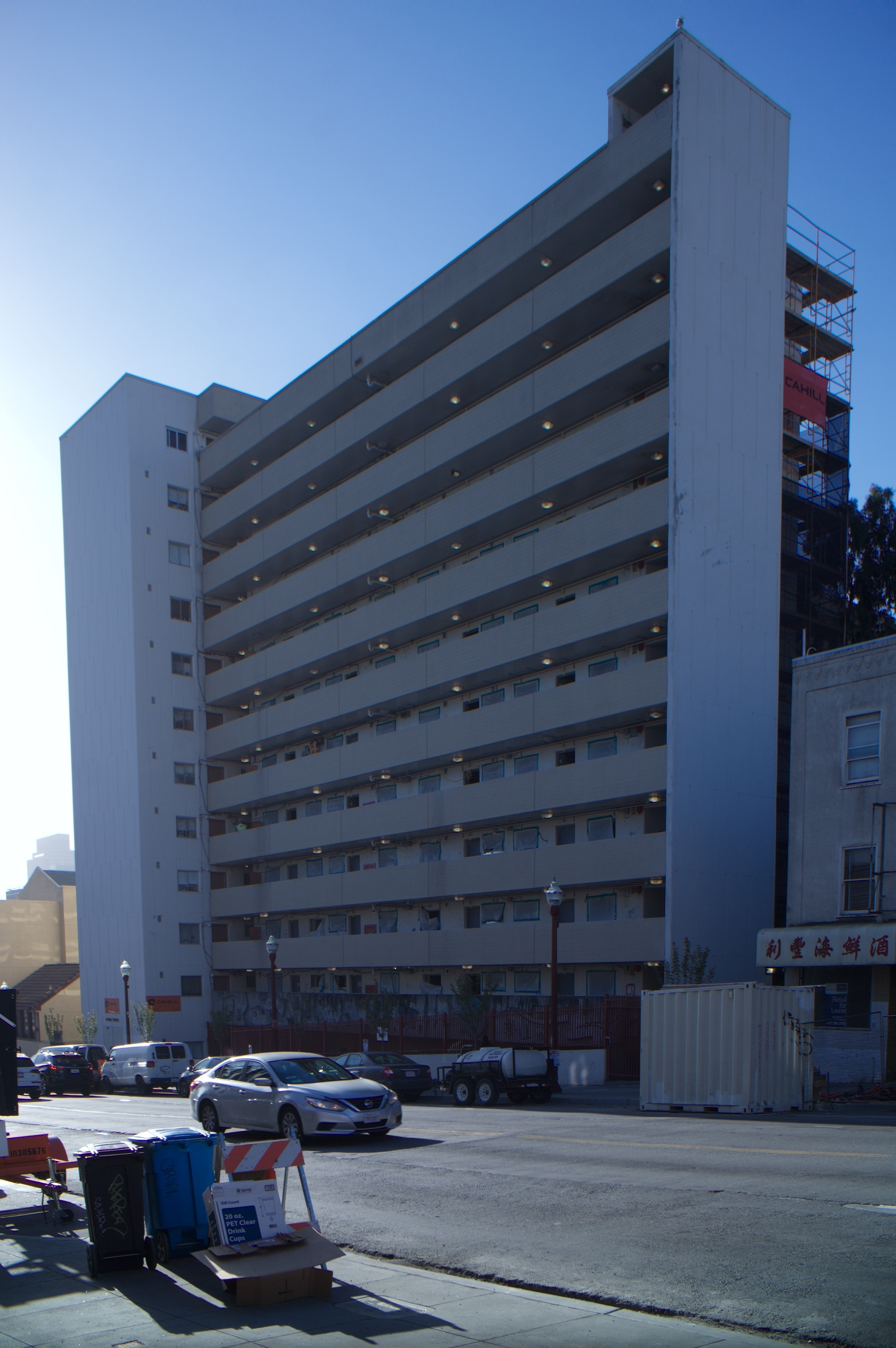
North Ping Yuen (from Broadway), under renovation in 2018

The SFHA was placed on a list of "troubled" local agencies in early 2013 by the United States Department of Housing and Urban Development after receiving 54 out of 100 possible points during an audit. Mayor Ed Lee responded by removing all but one of the SFHA Commission members, Patricia Thomas, a Ping Yuen resident appointed by Lee in December 2012. San Francisco decided to implement the Rental Assistance Demonstration program for SFHA properties in 2014, and by October 2016, the SFHA had sold all of them, including Ping Yuen and North Ping Yuen, to private developers. Under the conditions of the sale, the new developers were responsible for renovating the properties, which had become decrepit under the SFHA. Ping Yuen and North Ping Yuen were sold to the nonprofit Chinatown Community Development Center (CCDC) under the leadership of Rev. Norman Fong; the SFHA retained ownership of the land.

Starting in 2010, the original single-pane windows and steam-heat radiators were replaced. Under CCDC, the Sustainable Chinatown initiative was launched in 2017 to improve the environmental impact of the entire community, including Ping Yuen, which is scheduled to receive a photovoltaic array and additional efficiency upgrades.

== Design ==
Architects Mark Daniels and Henry T. Howard (son of John Galen Howard) were selected for the initial design of Ping Yuen, and handed over responsibility to the firm of Ward & Bolles after World War II. Douglas Baylis was the landscape architect. Daniels published an initial set of sketches showing a multistory building topped with fanciful pagoda roof elements in the December 1939 issue of Architect and Engineer; the work was commissioned by the San Francisco Junior Chamber of Commerce and received favorable local press coverage. By late 1941, the architects' concept more closely resembled the final construction. At the time, Daniels described the style as originating from "western and northern China"; Gwendolyn Wright has called it "Chinese regionalism superimposed over a functionalist design". It matched the "faux Chinese architectural style" that had already been used elsewhere in Chinatown during its reconstruction after the 1906 earthquake in the hope of attracting tourists.

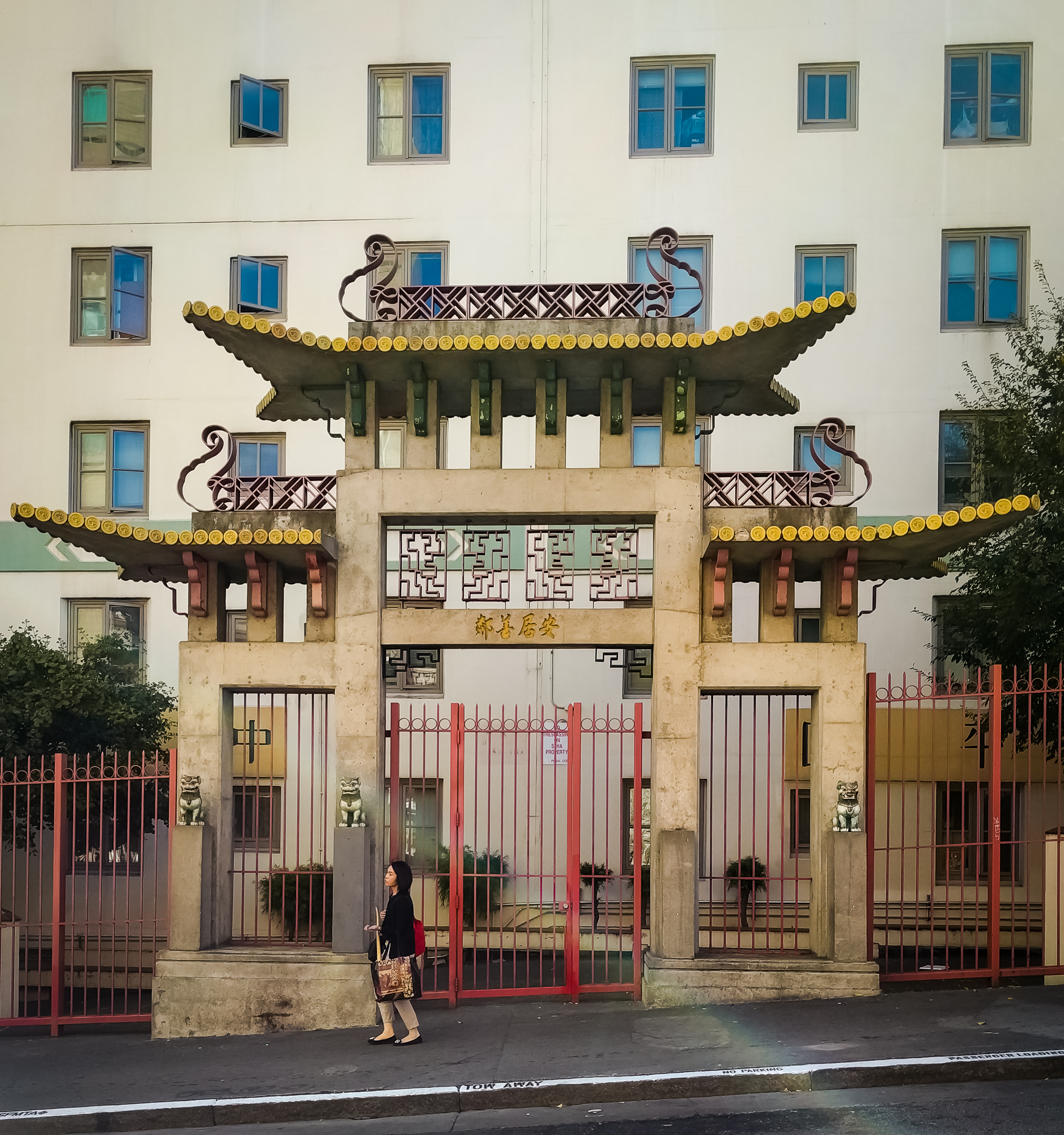
"Pailou Gate" at Central Ping Yuen (2016)

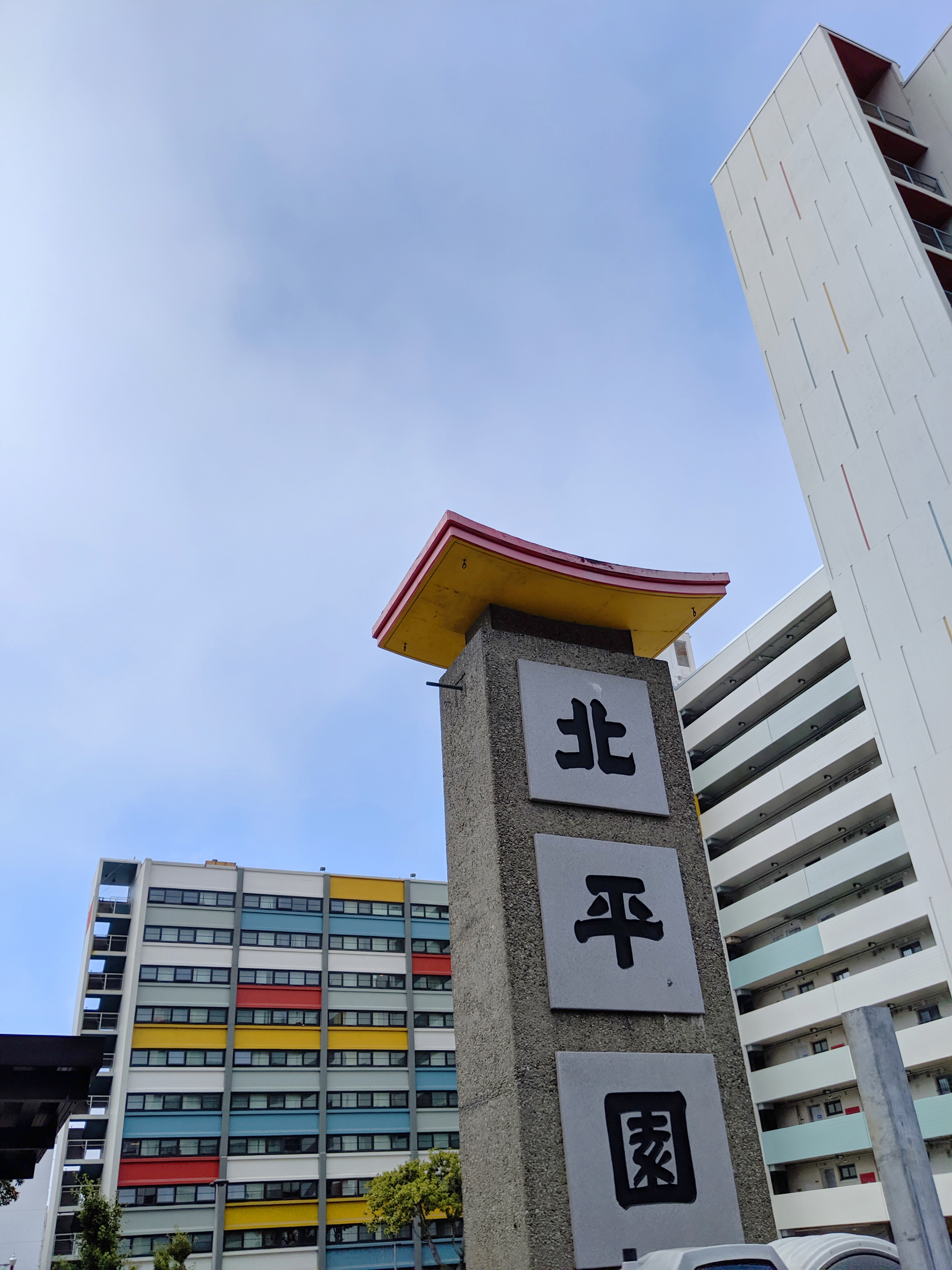
Monolithic sign at North Ping Yuen (2019)

Entrance markers to Ping Yuen and North Ping Yuen

The "Pailou Gate" in front of Central Ping Yuen was modeled after the paifang to the Marble Pagoda of the West Yellow Temple in Beijing. It was the first paifang built in the United States, according to the SFHA. The inscription above the gate (安居其鄰; Ānjū qí lín; on1 geoi1 kei4 leon4; 'Peace and prosperity among neighbors') is credited to Lao Tse. Similarly, a quote credited to Confucius is on the back of the entrance monolith to North Ping Yuen at 838 Pacific: 四海之內，皆兄弟也; Sìhǎi zhī nèi, jiē xiōngdì yě.; Sei3 hoi2 zi1 noi6, gaai1 hing1 dai6 jaa5.; 'Within the four seas', 'all men are brothers.'

The original 1955 plans for the expansion annex (eventually constructed as North Ping Yuen) were modest, at approximately 100 apartments. Bolles and Ernest Born are credited with the design for North Ping Yuen, with landscape architecture again handled by Baylis. By 1959, plans for the Annex had grown to be eleven stories tall (nearly twice the height of the older six-story Pings), holding 194 families (almost as many as the three original buildings combined), at a cost of $3,182,159.

Security measures, including the locked fence surrounding each building, were not added until after the murder of Julia Wong and subsequent rent strike of 1978–79. The SFHA felt that a fence would make Ping Yuen resemble a concentration camp; during the renovations that started in 2016, the fence around North Ping Yuen was partially demolished.

=== Statistics ===
Ping Yuen stock
Count	Ping Yuen				North Ping Yuen
Count	E	C	W	Total	North Ping Yuen
Studio	0	0	0	0	45
1-BR	12	22	12	46	33
2-BR (Note: Two set aside as manager's units, one each at Ping Yuen and North Ping Yuen.)	24	46	22	92	100
3-BR	19	38	18	75	22
4-BR	5	11	5	21	0
Total	60	117	57	234	200
Notes

Ping Yuen (West, Central, and East) consists of one six-story building and two seven-story buildings, all of which are on the south side of Pacific. West Ping Yuen is at the corner of Powell and Pacific; Central is at Stockton and Pacific, and East is at Beckett (parallel to and just east of Grant) and Pacific. Central Ping Yuen is the size of East and West Ping Yuen combined and has two street addresses, so it is sometimes counted as two buildings. The east side of Central Ping Yuen has more units than the west side (64 versus 53) because the west side includes a daycare and tenant association offices.

North Ping Yuen consists of a single twelve-story building that is within the block defined by Pacific, Stockton, Cordelia, and Broadway. They are informally and collectively called the "Pings". In total, there is 160,000 square feet (15,000 m^{2}) of residential floor space in the four Ping Yuen buildings; the three original Pings occupy a site with a total area of 2.617 acres (1.059 ha), acquired at a cost of US$380,800 (equivalent to $7,085,000 in 2025) and offer a total (gross) floor area of 237,838 ft^{2} (22,095.9 m^{2}). West and East Ping Yuen have one elevator each, Central Ping Yuen has two elevators, and North Ping Yuen has three elevators.

The original three-building Ping Yuen completed in 1951 cost $3.5 million, which collectively contained 234 apartments. Bedrooms and living rooms were designed to face south. Priority for applicants was given to the low-income families displaced by the demolition of existing buildings and World War II veterans. Under the SFHA's neighborhood policy (later ruled unconstitutional in 1952 and 1953), Ping Yuen was effectively segregated and reserved for Chinese residents. In 1999, the population of Ping Yuen remained largely Asian American.

A small 60 kW natural gas-fired cogeneration unit built by GM/Tecogen was added to North Ping Yuen in 2011.

=== Public art ===
The SFHA commissioned James Leong to create a mural for the NEHC waiting room for $1,000. One Hundred Years: History of the Chinese in America (completed in 1952) shows eight scenes depicting Chinese contributions to California history, starting with rice fields in China, passing through the Gold Rush and Transcontinental Railroad, and ending with a family arriving at Ping Yuen. However, the SFHA censored at least one scene, which Leong had tentatively named "The Denis Kearney episode" after the notorious Workingmen's Party of California leader and the San Francisco riot of 1877. After it was completed, the mural was criticized by the Chinatown community and was stored for decades; it was rediscovered in the late 1970s. Leong, stung by the reaction, moved to Europe in 1956. According to Leong, the FBI, Kuomintang, and Chinese Communist Party each suspected there were hidden messages in the mural. One Hundred Years is currently on display at the Chinese Historical Society of America museum in the former Chinatown YWCA on Clay. An enlarged version was temporarily wrapped around a building near Stockton and Washington in 2012; the building was later demolished to make way for the new Chinatown station.

Darryl Mar, a Los Angeles–based artist, completed the 1,400 ft^{2} (130 m^{2}) Ping Yuen Mural on the Stockton Street-facing side of Central Ping Yuen in 1995, with the assistance of Darren Acoba, Joyce Lu, and Tonia Chen. It is dedicated to "Sing Kan Mah and those who have struggled to make America their home"; the faces depicted in the mural are actual people, drawn from photographs of congregation members at Mar's church, Chang Jok Lee (a Ping Yuen resident since 1952 and longtime leader in the Ping Yuen Residents Improvement Association), and archived photographs of railroad and agriculture workers. The mural took approximately six weeks to complete, with support and involvement from Chinatown residents. Precita Eyes restored the mural in 2018.

Josie Grant (daughter of longtine Oakland Tribune editorial cartoonist Lou Grant) painted several murals on multiple Ping Yuen buildings from 1976 to 1982. These include the mural that can be seen on the exterior walls behind the fences around the south end of West Ping Yuen, extending to the wall facing Trenton Alley (entitled The Bok Sen (8 Immortals), 3 Wisdoms, and the Chinese Zodiac). Grant had also painted the Ping Yuen Tai Chi Mural in 1982, but that mural was inadvertently removed in 1994 following waterproofing repairs commissioned by the SFHA. Grant sued, as her contract with the city required 60 days' notice to remove the murals; as part of the settlement agreement, she was paid to paint another mural at the east end of East Ping Yuen, named Unity in Diversity. Grant's daughter, Abra Brayman, is co-credited for Unity in Diversity.

Jim Dong painted an untitled mural for the playground at Central Ping Yuen in 1983. Dong was born in Chinatown, raised at Ping Yuen, and also painted the 1986 mural overlooking Willie "Woo Woo" Wong playground in Chinatown.

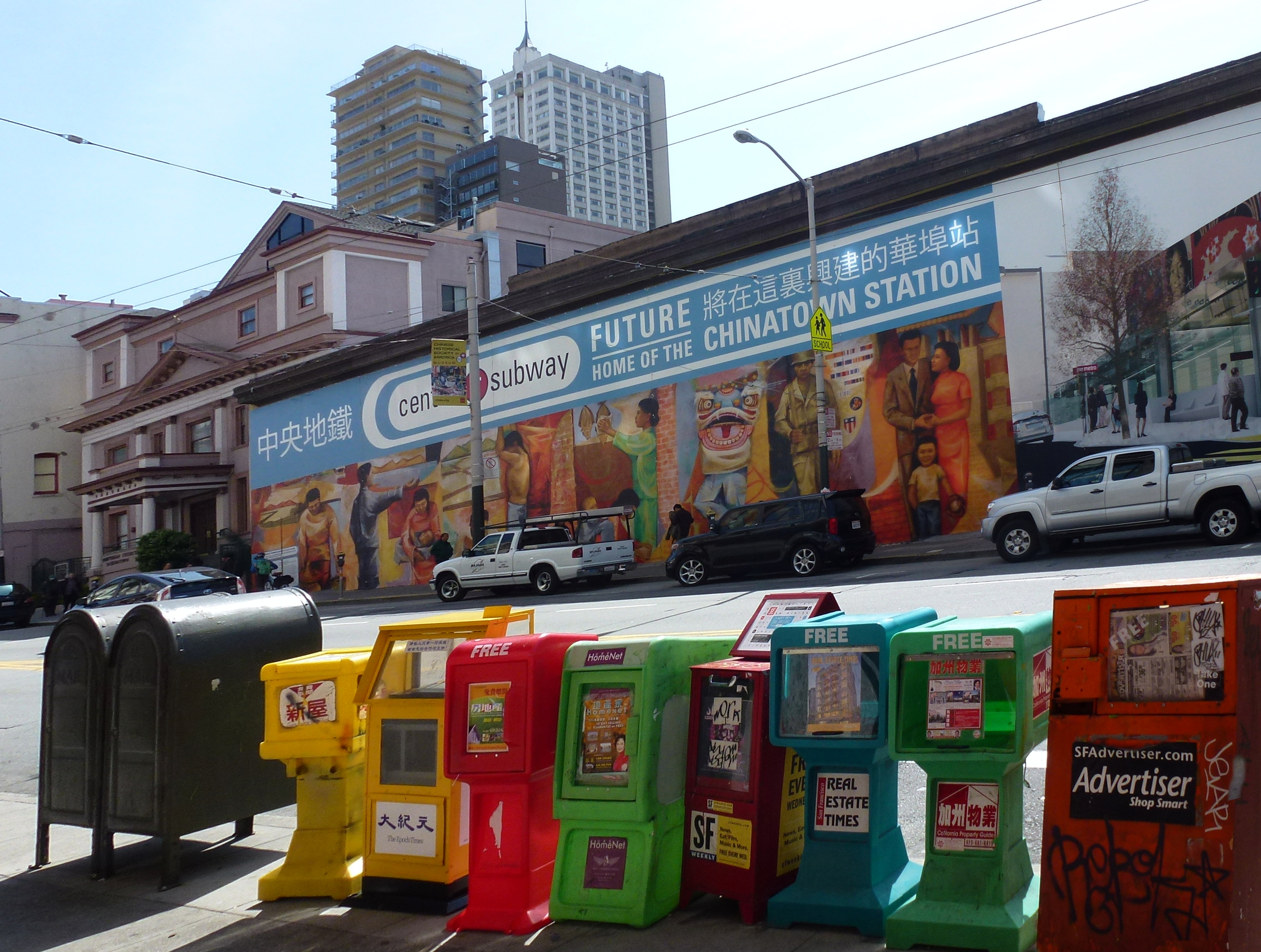
Enlargement of One Hundred Years by James Leong, photographed in 2012 as a vinyl wrap on the Hogan & Vest building near Stockton and Washington.

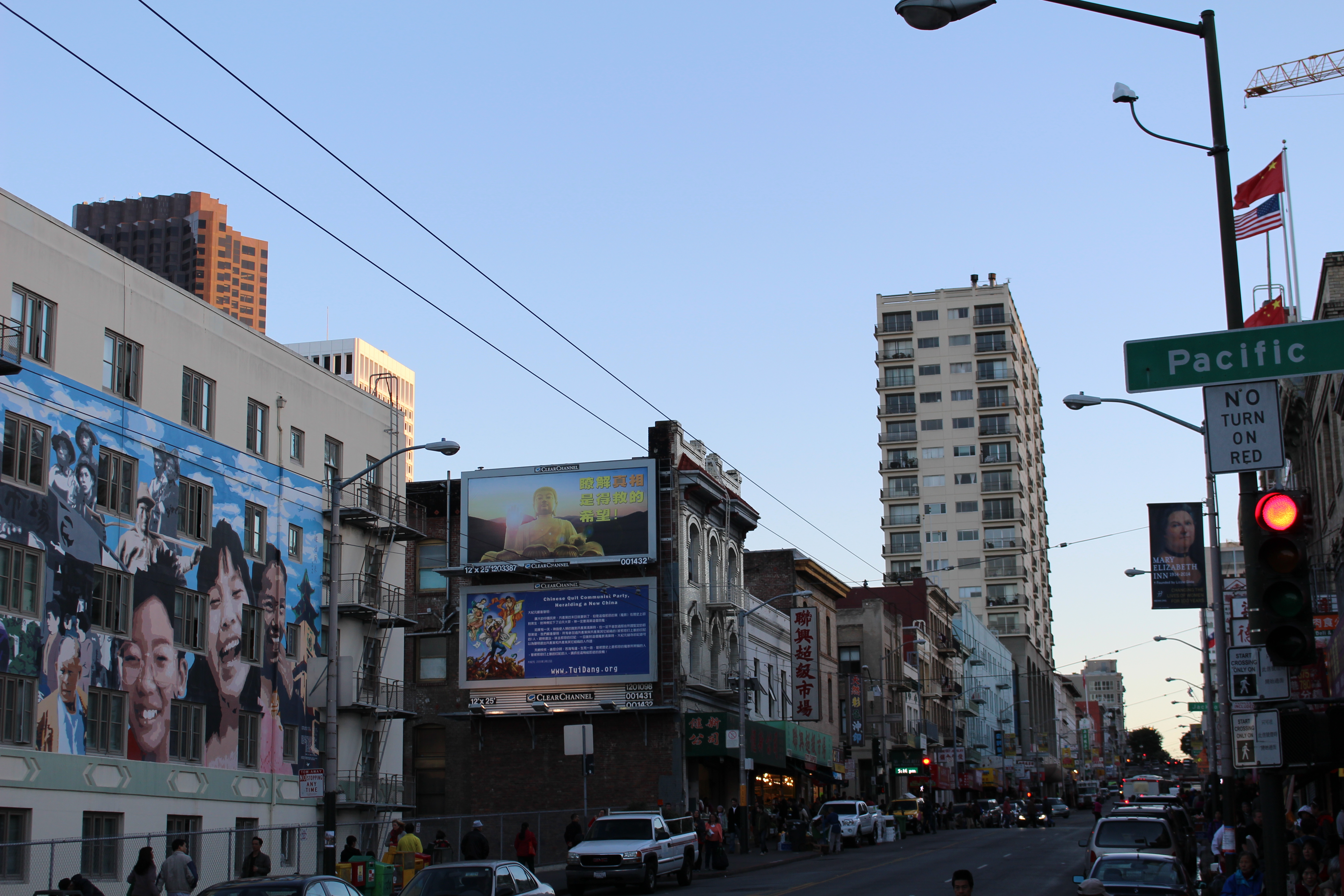
Ping Yuen Mural by Darryl Mar on Central Ping Yuen can be seen at the left side of this image, taken from the corner of Stockton and Pacific, facing south.

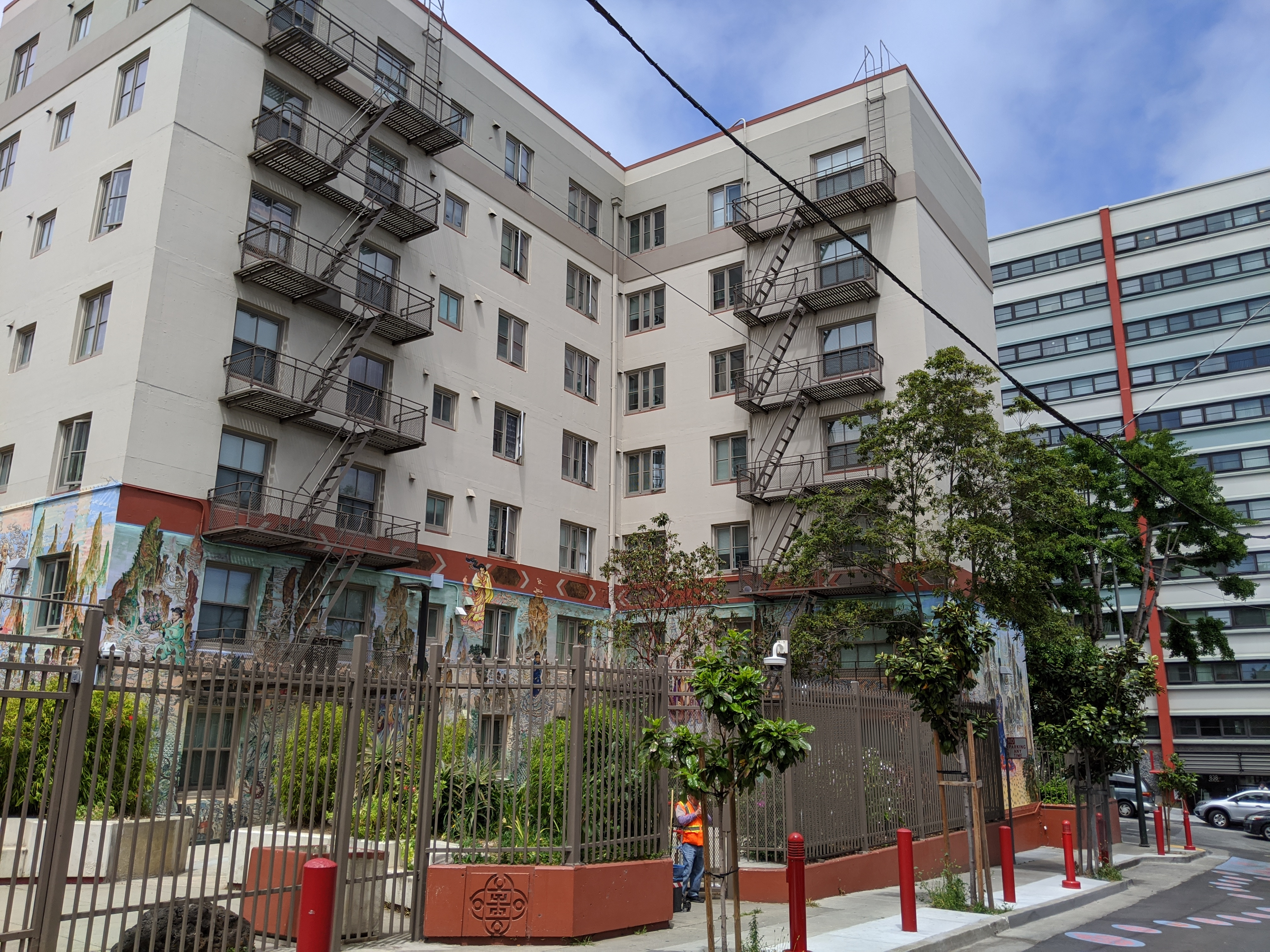
The Bok Sen (8 Immortals), 3 Wisdoms, and the Chinese Zodiac by Josie Grant is painted on the exterior of the lower level of West Ping Yuen, taken from Trenton Alley, facing north.
