= James Leong =

American artist

James Chan Leong
- Born: November 27, 1929; San Francisco, California
- Died: April 15, 2011 (aged 81); Seattle, Washington
- Occupation: Artist

Chinese name
- Traditional Chinese: 梁漢強
- Hanyu Pinyin: Liáng Hànqiáng

James Chan Leong (November 27, 1929 – April 15, 2011) was an influential Chinese American artist from San Francisco, California who used his paintings to convey his struggles and revelations with racial identity.

== Early life ==
Leong was born on November 27, 1929, in San Francisco's Chinatown, an ethnic enclave of recent Chinese immigrants to the United States. Leong grew up in this area during pre- and post-World War II, where he battled constant prejudice as an Asian American. Leong suffered from a discriminatory attack as a child that left him partially blind in one eye. Asian Americans who were not Japanese during World War II wore special badges to indicate and identify their ethnicity, because they did not want to be mistaken for being an enemy during a time when the United States was at war with Japan. Because of this, Leong wore a button that indicated his Chinese descent. Each badge cost $5 and Leong would often lose them.

He stated, "I really felt there was a lot of misunderstanding on the part of the whites in San Francisco as to what being Chinese meant."

Leong's first encounter with art was when he was introduced by his father to a co-worker named Alan Cole. Cole was a painter and photographer of the 1939 World's Fair. Leong studied oil painting under Cole for six years. Growing up, Leong and his family had differing opinions on his future career, as Leong desired to become an artist while his family preferred he begin a career in medicine.

At age 23, Leong worked for the Chinese press. Business leaders from Chinatown commissioned Leong to create a mural of Chinese American history. This painting was named One Hundred Years: History of the Chinese in America and was commissioned to be placed in Ping Yuen, the first federally funded public housing in Chinatown.

Leong was awarded a scholarship and received a master's degree in Fine Arts at California College of Arts and Crafts in 1952. He also went on to receive his Master of Arts in Arts Education at San Francisco State University in 1955. He was inspired by the work of artists like Walt Kuhn, Yasuo Kuniyoshi and Dong Kingman. During this time, Leong grew strong friendships with fellow artists like Nathan Oliveira and Clayton Pinkerton. He and other artists would spend their time in the famous bohemian hot spots of San Francisco, such as the Iron Pot Restaurant, Vesuvios Bar and City Lights Bookstore.

== Career ==
In 1956, when Leong was 27, he traveled to Norway with his then wife Karen and son Kim for two years on a Fulbright Scholarship. After this, he also received a Guggenheim Fellowship that took Leong and his then family to Rome where he painted and focused on abstract art at the American Academy. There, he converted the fifteenth-century Palazzo Pio into a haven for artists. Here, Leong would sublet spaces to other artists including Cy Twombly and Warrington Colescott. Through his experience of 31 years in Rome, Leong found that the Italian people were far more accepting of his Chinese American identity than that of those in his home country.

I think more than anything else, it gave me a sense of self and assurance that you don't have here. [...] People in America are constantly questioning who you are, what you are. There's always a stratum here that you have to belong to.

This acceptance sparked Leong's own exploration of his Chinese American roots in his artwork. Along with a trip to China with his wife and son, Leong was soon expressing this new rediscovery of identity in his paintings.

That opened up all kinds of things. [...] I realized I was always Chinese, but there's the duality of taking the next step. As an American, you can never really be Chinese, even if you speak it and know the culture. There's a part of you that's American that's so different. And those are the things that came out of my paintings.

== Later years ==
Leong's art is best characterized as abstract expressionism, with the subjects and interests of his paintings constantly changing over time. He shifted from painting the relationships of nature and humans to painting the historic relationships of East and West.

After living for three decades in Italy, Leong settled in Pioneer Square in Seattle in 1994, finding the town to be the perfect blend of San Francisco and Europe. There, he served as arts commissioner and on advisory boards for several museums. In 1997, Leong was nominated for a National Medal for the Arts from the National Endowment of the Arts.

== Death ==
Leong died from congestive heart failure on April 15, 2011, at the Swedish Medical Center. He was constantly creating and influencing art until his death.
