= Third Street Light Rail Project =

San Francisco Muni tram line

Third Street Light Rail
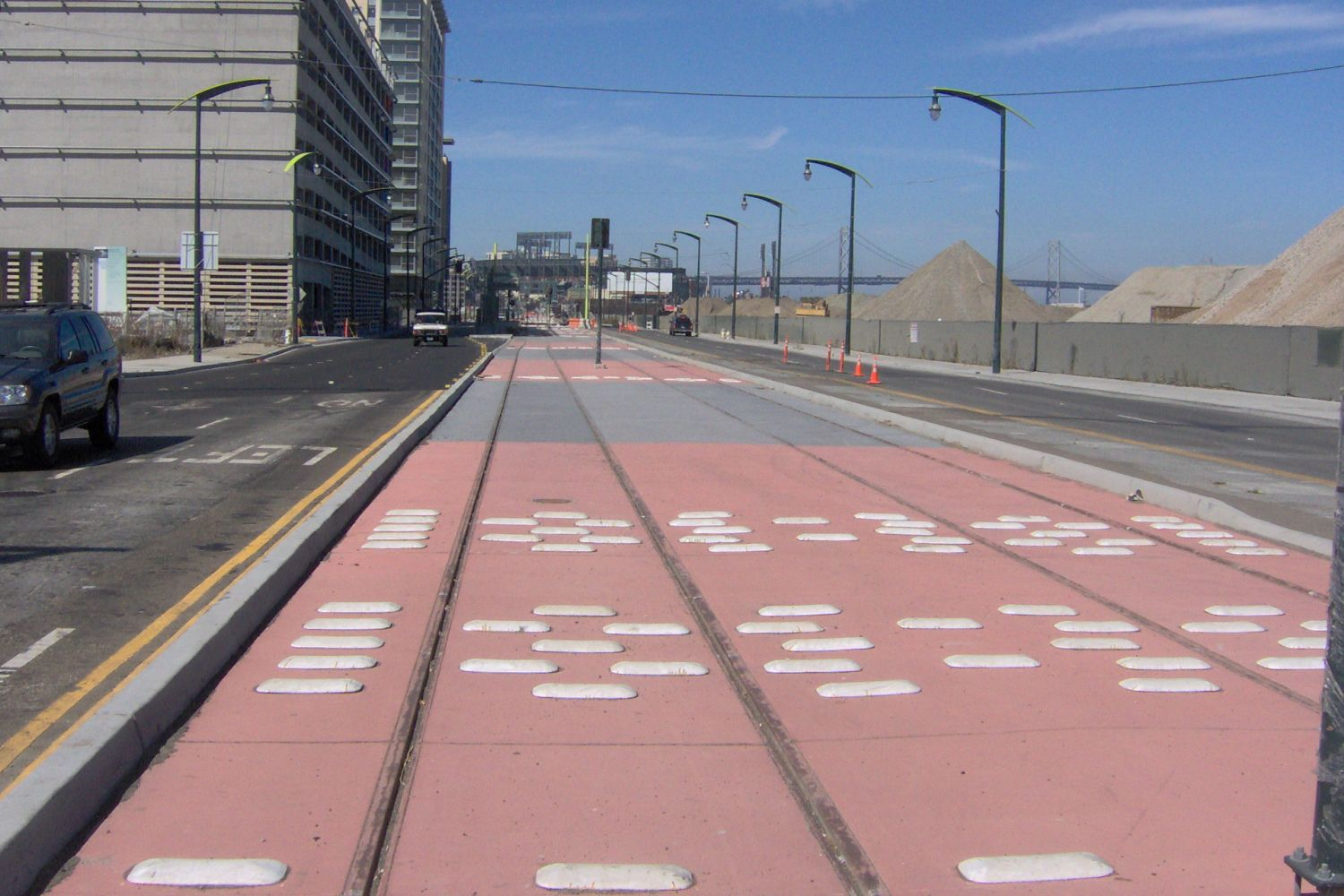
- New tracks on 3rd Street north of 16th Street in September 2005

Overview
- Owner: San Francisco Municipal Transportation Agency
- Locale: San Francisco, California
- Stations: 18

Service
- Type: Light rail
- System: Muni Metro
- Operator(s): San Francisco Municipal Railway

History
- Opened: April 7, 2007

Technical
- Line length: 5.1 miles (8.2 km)
- Track gauge: 4 ft 8 1/2 in (1,435 mm) (standard gauge)
- Electrification: Overhead lines, 600 V DC

The Third Street Light Rail Project was the construction project that expanded the Muni Metro system in San Francisco, California, linking downtown San Francisco to the historically underserved southeastern neighborhoods of Bayview-Hunters Point and Visitacion Valley along the eastern side of the city. Construction was finished in late 2006, non-revenue weekend service began on January 13, 2007, and full service began on April 7, 2007. The new service, as the T Third Street Metro line, replaced the 15 Third bus line, which ran south from the Caltrain Depot at 4th and King streets, along Third Street and Bayshore Boulevard to the southeastern neighborhoods.

== History ==
In 1993, the San Francisco Municipal Railway published the Bayshore Transit Study, which offered the following seven goals:

1. Improve transit service to, from and within the Bayshore corridor (decrease transit times and improve ridership)
2. Facilitate economic development in the area (stimulate new development and employment)
3. Enhance the area's environment (air quality and visual improvements)
4. Enhanced current and planned City & regional transportation (connections to other modes of transportation)
5. Implement a cost-effective and financially feasible system (minimize operating and capital costs)
6. Implement project as soon as possible
7. Implement an equitable system (bringing transit service to citywide levels)

The Bayshore Transit Study presented nine alternatives (including a "do nothing" alternative) ranging from building a trolley coach to expanding the MUNI Metro light rail system. In the two alternative light rail routes proposed, rail service would be extended south to Caltrain's Bayshore Station along Third Street from the Financial District. Potential future extensions studied included lines along Hunter's Point, in Little Hollywood (to Candlestick Park), and along Bayshore and Geneva to the Balboa Park station.

The project was initially budgeted at $667 million. As of July 2006, the budget increased by $120 million.

== Route ==
The T Third starts at Chinatown station, and runs through the Central Subway to the Caltrain Depot at 4th and King streets, then along Third Street. The 15-Third bus line was eliminated and the 8-Bayshore bus line was extended to replace the 15 in areas not served by the metro extension, including City College and Fisherman's Wharf.

The extension was supposed to connect directly to the Bayshore Caltrain Station when the station was in San Francisco County. However, as part of Caltrain's 2004 CTX project, Caltrain relocated the Bayshore Station to San Mateo County without informing Muni. To complicate matters, this connection has been plagued by cost and design issues. As a result, the southern end of the line terminates at the Sunnydale Station on Bayshore Boulevard for the time being.

=== Features ===
18 new stations were built along the line. They consist of either island platforms between the tracks or side platforms, with elevated platform heights to allow level boarding with the internal train stairs raised, similar to the ones used by the N Judah along the Embarcadero.

As part of the project, the entire Third Street corridor was repaved and received new streetlights. Additionally, palm trees were planted, sidewalks reconstructed and the pavement on 3rd Street repaved. Stations along the route have a distinctive marquee pole with a sculpture or mobile.

Light rail vehicles (LRVs) operate in an exclusive right-of-way in the center of the street along most of the line to bypass vehicular congestion and increase speed along the line. LRVs operate in mixed flow traffic at the 4th Street Bridge (the bridge does not have enough room for LRV exclusive right-of-way) and in a 10 block segment (from Kirkwood/La Salle stop through Revere/Shafter) in the Bayview business district to maintain parking on both sides of the street for customers of local businesses.

In addition, transit signal priority has been implemented along the entire corridor. The goal is to allow LRVs to have a green light at every intersection so they can travel from station to station without stopping.

== Further expansion ==
The Third Street Light Rail Project is the first part of a multi-phase plan to expand the Muni Metro system. The second phase, known as the Central Subway, removed the need for the T Third to share tracks with N Judah north of 4th and King. T Third was routed to new tracks extending north from the Caltrain depot at 4th and King above ground to a new station at 4th and Brannan, then proceeds underground with intermediate stops at the new stations Yerba Buena/Moscone station and Union Square/Market Street station before terminating at Chinatown station at Stockton and Washington Streets. In addition, the second phase includes short turn service via the new Mission Bay Loop, which was completed in 2019 at a cost of $10.2 million. This improves service to Chase Center. T Third trains began through-running into the Central Subway on January 7, 2023.

In early March 2009, media and community groups proposed that as the Central Subway is being built, plans should be drawn up to extend the T Third past Chinatown through North Beach and Fisherman's Wharf neighborhoods, passing Pier 39, potentially using an old steam railroad line underneath Fort Mason and ending up at The Presidio. These plans were presented in October 2014 as a third phase (northern extension to Fisherman's Wharf) and a conceptual fourth phase (extension west to the Presidio). Formal planning for a Central Subway extension was kicked off in late 2018 with several community meetings, and an Alternatives Study is underway with a projected completion in late 2019.
