= Union Square/Market Street station =

Underground light rail station in San Francisco, California, US

Union Square/Market Street
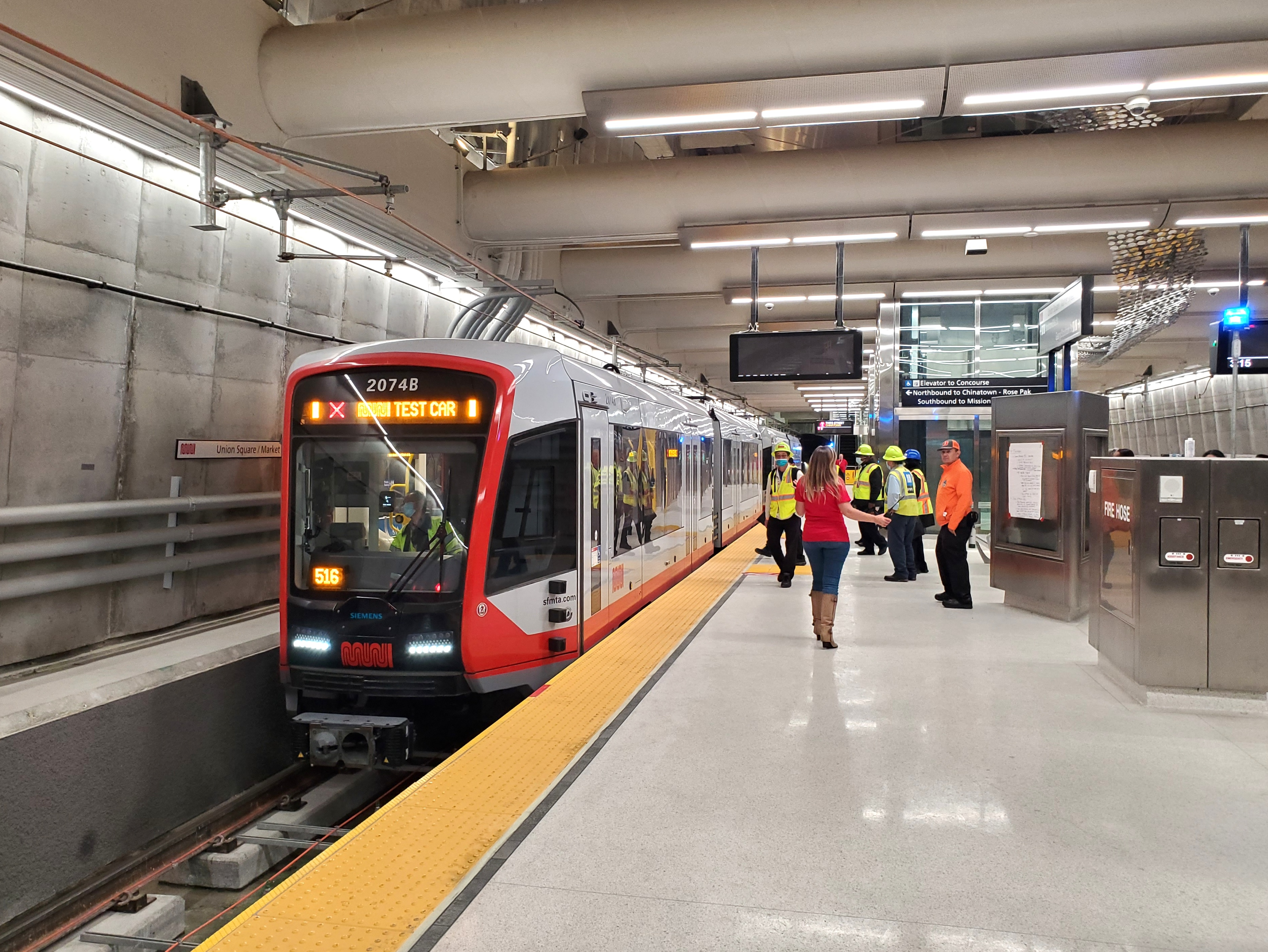
- A train at Union Square/Market Street station in November 2022

General information
- Location: Stockton Street and Geary Street; San Francisco, California
- Coordinates: 37.787682°N 122.407036°W
- Line: Central Subway
- Platforms: 1 island platform
- Tracks: 2
- Connections: at Powell; at Powell; Powell–Hyde, Powell–Mason; Muni: 5, 5R, 6, 7, 7X, 8, 8AX, 8BX, 9, 9R, 21, 27, 30, 31, 45, 81X, Geary BRT (38, 38R)

Construction
- Structure type: Underground
- Accessible: Yes

History
- Opened: November 19, 2022

Passengers
- February 2023: 1,498 daily boardings

Services
Preceding station	Muni	Following station
Chinatown Terminus	T Third Street	Yerba Buena/Moscone toward Sunnydale
Location

Union Square/Market Street station is an underground Muni Metro light rail station located under Stockton Street between Geary Street and Market Street in San Francisco, California. It is adjacent to the southeast corner of Union Square. The station opened on November 19, 2022, as part of the Central Subway project. It is the penultimate northbound station on the T Third Street, since T service moved to the Central Subway on January 7, 2023.

== History ==
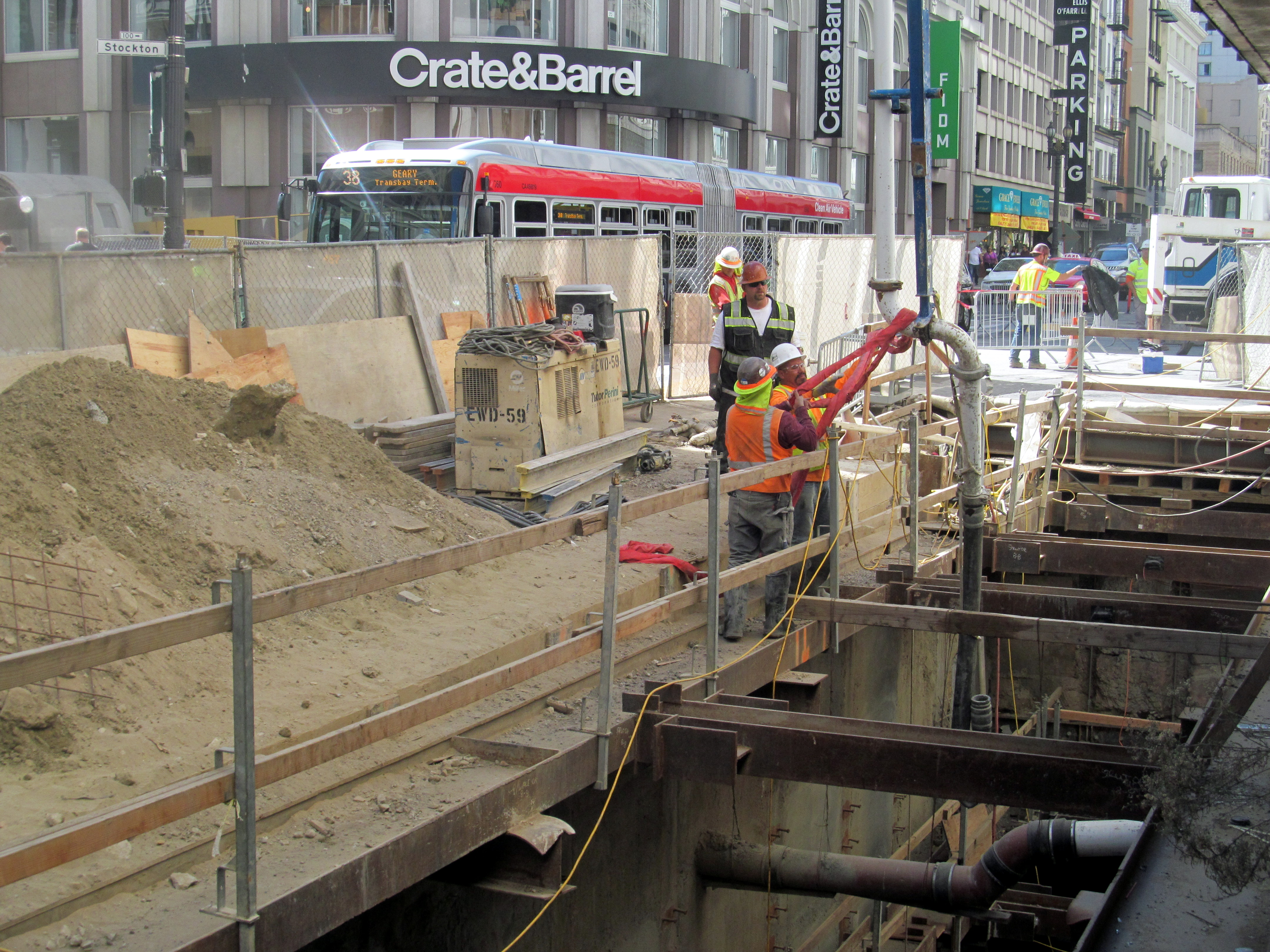
Concrete being poured in September 2017

The station is located under Stockton Street between Geary Street and Market Street. The main entrance is on Geary Street at the southeast corner of Union Square. The south end of the station is connected to the mezzanine level of the existing Powell Street station outside fare control. The existing entrance to Powell Street station on Stockton Street at Ellis Street was purchased from BART for one dollar, and was temporarily closed in 2014 so it could be converted into a shared entrance to both stations.

Station excavation was completed by July 2017, and concrete was poured for the station floor.

Stockton Street reopened between Geary Street and Ellis Street on February 22, 2019. Muni route 8/8AX/8BX and 91 buses returned to lower Stockton Street and 4th Street on February 25; route 30 and 45 trolleybuses returned on April 13 after overhead wires were re-installed.

San Francisco Chronicle architecture critic John King called Union Square/Market Street the "most disappointing in terms of design" of the Central Subway stations. King criticized the bare concrete walls and large ceiling beams of the platform level, as well as the "nondescript" nature of the Union Square headhouse.

The Central Subway was closed from February 26 to March 14, 2025, for water leakage mitigation at Chinatown station.

== Artwork ==
Of the ten artworks installed for the Central Subway, three are located at Union Square/Market Street station:

- Lucy in the Sky by Erwin Redl consists of Hundreds of 10 by 10 inches (250 mm × 250 mm) LED-array-illuminated translucent panels on the ceiling of the concourse level, programmed to change colors, display patterns, and animations.
- Illuminated Scroll by Jim Campbell and Werner Klotz is a stainless steel ribbon measuring approximately 250 feet (76 m) long and varying in width between 4–8 feet (1.2–2.4 m) that winds above the platform.
- Convergence: Commute Patterns by Hughen Starkweather consists of patterns on the glass deck and elevators of the Union Square headhouse superimposed on a topographical map, illustrating commute patterns in the Bay Area.
