= Yerba Buena/Moscone station =

Underground light rail station in San Francisco, California, US

Yerba Buena/Moscone
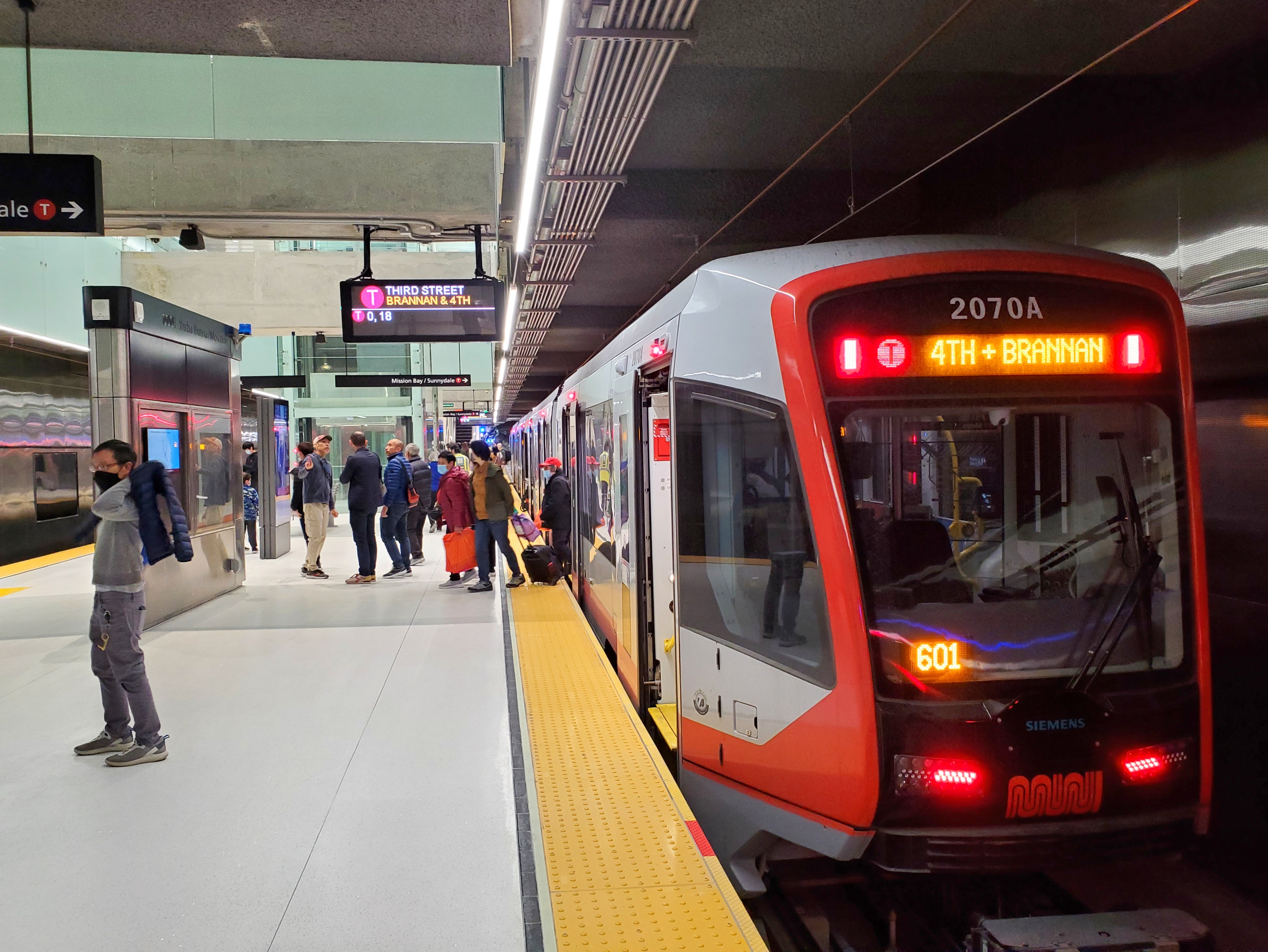
- A train at Yerba Buena/Moscone station in November 2022

General information
- Location: 4th Street at Folsom Street; San Francisco, California
- Coordinates: 37.782062°N 122.400911°W
- Line: Central Subway
- Platforms: 1 island platform
- Tracks: 2
- Connections: Muni: 8, 8AX, 8BX, 12, 30, 45

Construction
- Structure type: Underground
- Accessible: Yes

History
- Opened: November 19, 2022

Passengers
- February 2023: 300 daily boardings

Services
Preceding station	Muni	Following station
Union Square/Market Street toward Chinatown	T Third Street	4th and Brannan toward Sunnydale
Location

Yerba Buena/Moscone station is an underground Muni Metro light rail station located at 4th Street and Folsom Street in the South of Market (SoMa) district of San Francisco, California. It is named for the adjacent Yerba Buena Gardens and Moscone Convention Center. It opened on November 19, 2022, as part of the Central Subway project. The station is served by the T Third Street line which runs between Chinatown and Sunnydale.

== Service ==
Yerba Buena station has only one entrance, located close to but not along the intersection of 4th Street and Folsom Street. Escalators, elevators, and stairs take passengers between the surface and the ticket hall, labeled as a Concourse level by the station. After passing through fare gates, passengers take a second set of elevators, escalators, and stairs down to platform level. The station is designed as an island platform, though the immediately upper level within the station hosts additional balconies.

The station is also served by Muni bus routes 8, 12, 30 and 45, plus two weekday peak hours express services, the 8AX and 8BX. Additionally, the T Bus and 91 Owl bus routes, provide service along the T Third Street line during the early morning and late night hours respectively when trains do not operate.

The Central Subway was closed from February 26 to March 14, 2025, for water leakage mitigation at Chinatown station.

== Artwork ==
Of the ten artworks installed for the Central Subway, three are located at Yerba Buena/Moscone station:

- Node by Roxy Paine, is a 110 feet (34 m)-tall sculpture shaped like a branch, tapering from a diameter of 48 inches (1,200 mm) at the base to 1/4 inch (6.4 mm) at the peak, located in the plaza outside the station.
- An untitled work by Catherine Wagner consists of her photographs taken during the late 1970s during the construction of the Moscone Center, rendered on etched granite panels approximately 10 by 12.5 feet (3.0 m × 3.8 m) on the mezzanine and platform walls. One photograph is rendered in art glass at the surface level station entry at 14 by 23 feet (4.3 m × 7.0 m).
- Face C/Z by Leslie Shows is a photographic image of iron pyrite enlarged to 36 by 15 feet (11.0 m × 4.6 m) and rendered in glass, metal, gravel, and other materials above the faregates.

A work by Tom Otterness, consisting of 59 bronze sculptures, was canceled in November 2011 after it was publicized that Otterness had previously filmed himself in 1977 shooting a dog for the piece "Shot Dog Film". Three temporary artworks were displayed on the fence around the construction site: Horizons by Kota Ezawa in 2013–14, Ellipsis in the Key of Blue by Randy Colosky in 2014, and Procession, by Jason Jägel in 2017.
