= UCSF Medical Center station =

Muni Metro light rail station in San Francisco

UCSF Medical Center
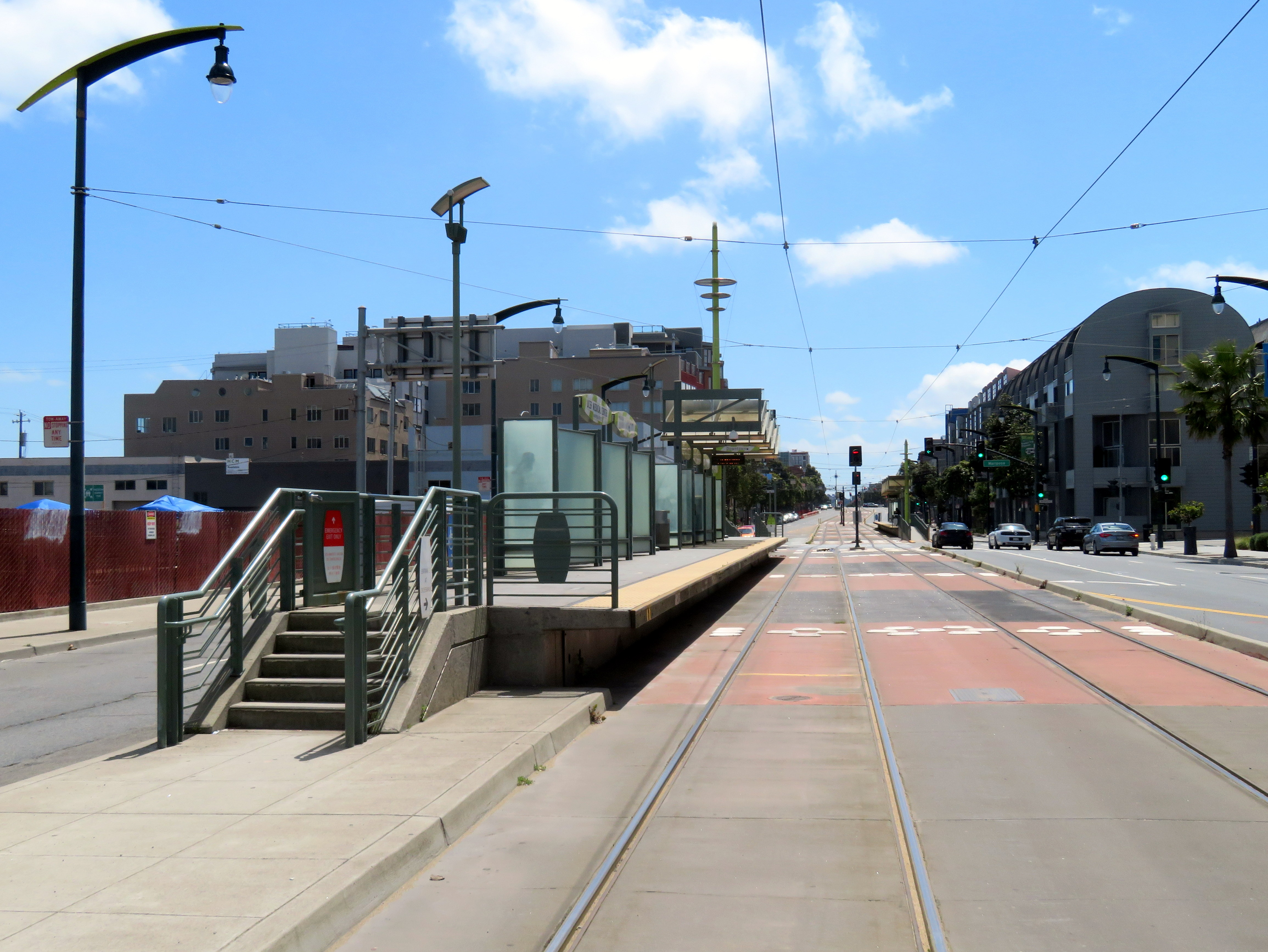
- The northbound station platform in April 2018

General information
- Other names: Mariposa Street
- Location: Third Street at Mariposa Street; San Francisco, California
- Coordinates: 37°45′50″N 122°23′18″W
- Platforms: 2 side platforms
- Tracks: 2

Construction
- Cycle facilities: Bay Wheels station
- Accessible: Yes

History
- Opened: January 13, 2007

Services
Preceding station	Muni	Following station
UCSF/Chase Center toward Chinatown	T Third Street	20th Street toward Sunnydale
Location

UCSF Medical Center station (also signed as Mariposa Street) is a light rail station on the Muni Metro T Third Street line, located in the median of Third Street at Mariposa Street in the Mission Bay neighborhood of San Francisco, California. The station serves the UCSF Medical Center and the larger UCSF Mission Bay campus. The station opened with the T Third Street line on January 13, 2007. It has two side platforms; the northbound platform is north of Mariposa Street, and the southbound platform south of Mariposa Street, which allows trains to pass through the intersection before stopping at the station.

The station is served by the T Bus and 91 Owl bus routes, which provide service along the T Third Street line during the early morning and late night hours respectively when trains do not operate.
