= T Third Street =

Light rail line in San Francisco, California

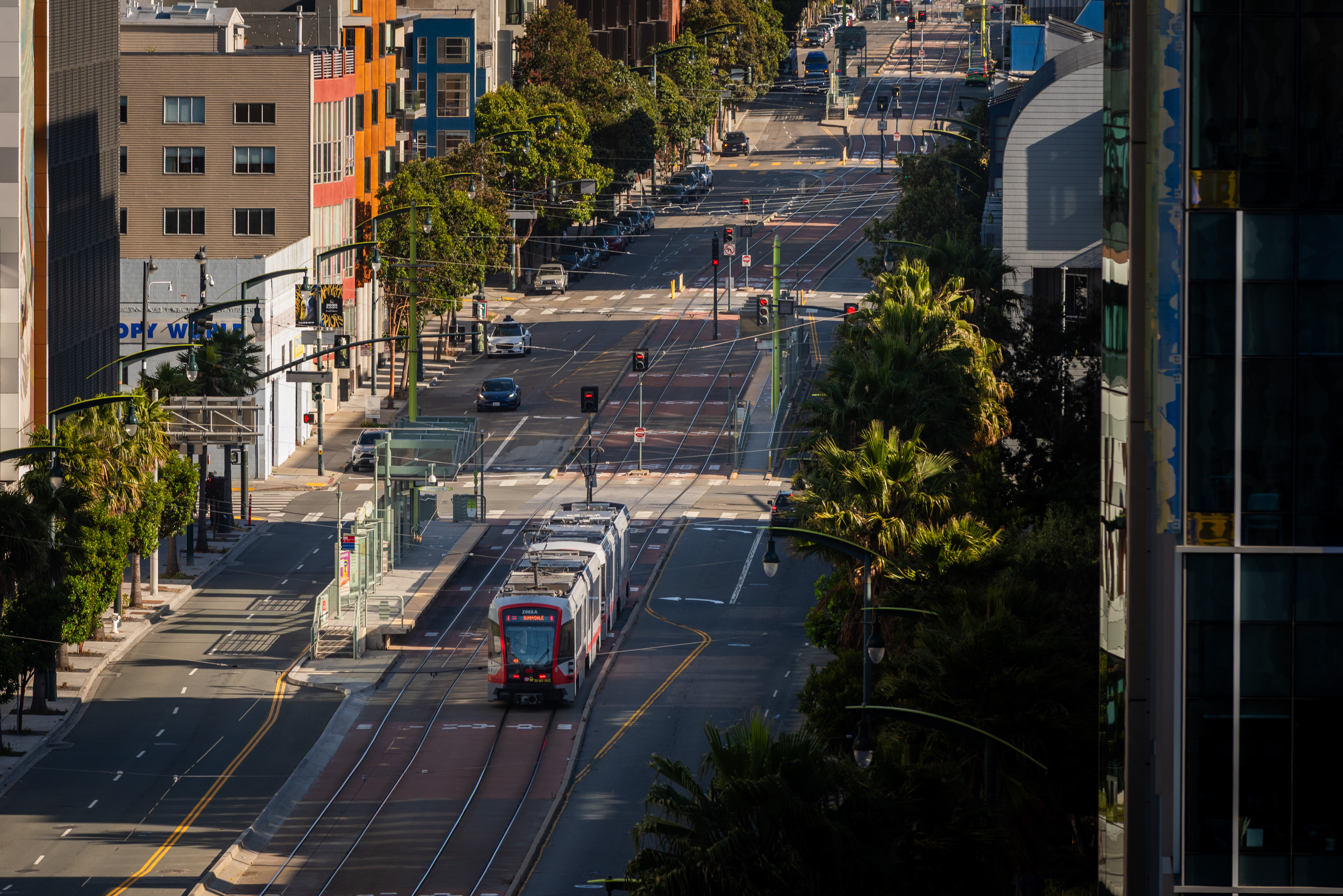
- A southbound train approaches UCSF Medical Center station.

Overview
- Owner: San Francisco Municipal Transportation Agency
- Locale: San Francisco, California
- Termini: Chinatown; Sunnydale
- Stations: 22

Service
- Type: Light rail
- System: Muni Metro
- Operator: San Francisco Municipal Railway
- Rolling stock: Siemens LRV4
- Daily ridership: 27,600 (June 2026)

History
- Opened: January 13, 2007 (limited service); April 7, 2007 (full service)

Technical
- Track gauge: 4 ft 8 1/2 in (1,435 mm) standard gauge
- Electrification: Overhead line, 600 V DC
Route map
T Third Street highlighted in red

The T Third Street is a Muni Metro light rail line in San Francisco, California. It runs along the east side of San Francisco from Sunnydale to Chinatown, traveling in the median of Third Street for most of its length before entering the Central Subway as it approaches downtown. The line serves 22 stations, all of which are accessible. Most of the surface portion of the line runs in dedicated median lanes, though two portions operate in mixed traffic.

Limited service began in January 2007, with full service starting in April of the same year. The line was rerouted north of 4th and King to travel through the Central Subway to Chinatown on January 7, 2023. It was the first line added to the Muni Metro system since the N Judah in 1928.

== Operations ==
=== Route ===
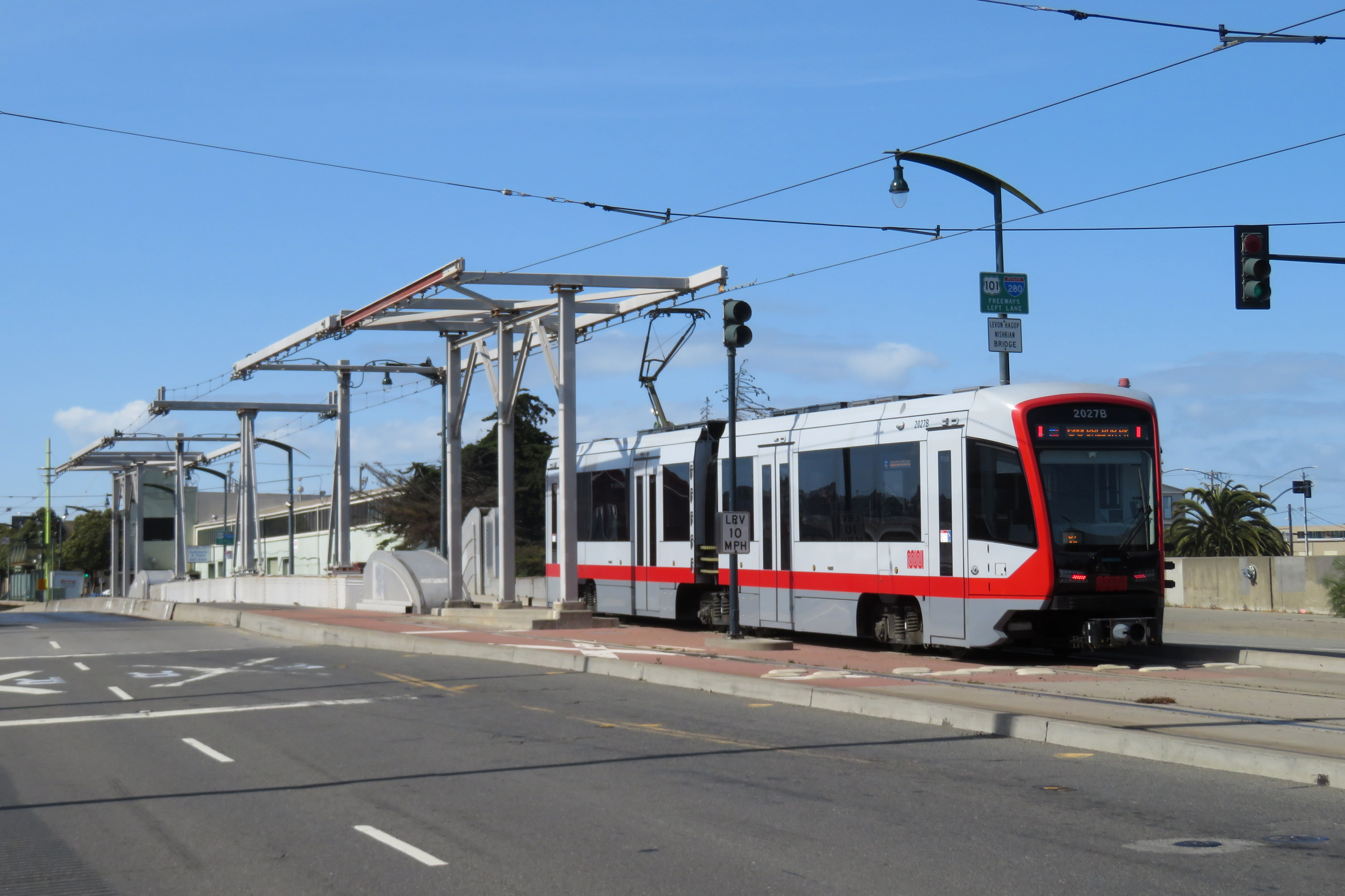
A train on the Islais Creek bridge

The T Third Street's northern terminus is Chinatown station inside the Central Subway. Trains operate south below Stockton Street to Union Square/Market Street station, which offers a connection to Powell Street station as the line does not enter the Market Street subway. The line then tunnels underneath 4th Street to serve Yerba Buena/Moscone station in the SoMA district before surfacing south of the Interstate 80 bypass, where it serves a stop at the 4th and Brannan station. The T then crosses the N tracks at 4th and King and continues south to 3rd Street. Additional short turn service between Chinatown and Mission Bay Loop will be later added. The line runs south through the Mission Bay neighborhood in a dedicated median, passing the Mission Bay Loop between 18th and 19th Streets, which is used to allow trains to turn around at Mission Bay or to hold special trains to serve events at Chase Center.

The line continues south through Dogpatch and across Islais Creek into the Bayview and Hunters Point neighborhoods. It runs in mixed traffic for 1/2 mile (0.80 km) from Kirkwood Avenue to Shafter Avenue, then returns to dedicated lanes. A wye, occasionally used for short turning trains, is located at Armstrong Avenue. The line crosses the U.S. Route 101 freeway, where Third Street becomes Bayshore Boulevard, and continues south in the median. The southern terminus of the line is at Sunnydale station in the Visitacion Valley neighborhood.

=== Service ===
The T Third operates seven days a week, beginning at 5 a.m. weekdays, 6 a.m. Saturdays and 8 a.m. Sundays, operating until 1 a.m. Service is provided by the 91 Owl overnight bus during the hours that rail service is not running. On weekends, T Third Street Bus service runs from 5am until the start of rail service. The bus line largely follows the rail line, but it uses surface streets to parallel sections where the rail line has dedicated rights-of-way.

== History ==
=== Background ===
Regular horsecar service along Kentucky Street commenced on May 5, 1867 under the ownership of the Potrero and Bay View Railroad. Cars initially ran south from the Third and Townsend Depot to the cutting in the Potrero. The line was extended to the Uplands south of Islais Creek (an area then called South San Francisco) that August. The single track was laid on the side of the roadway and did not have passing points, so patrons needed to transfer cars half way along the route to make the full trip. The Potrero and Bay View Railroad was amalgamated into the Market Street Railway in 1893.

The line was converted to electric streetcar operation with service beginning in January 1895 — a move hailed as a major upgrade. It was operated as such until 1941, when repaving allowed the transit operator to replace the line with buses. The 15 Third Street bus was discontinued with the beginning of light rail service.

=== Construction ===
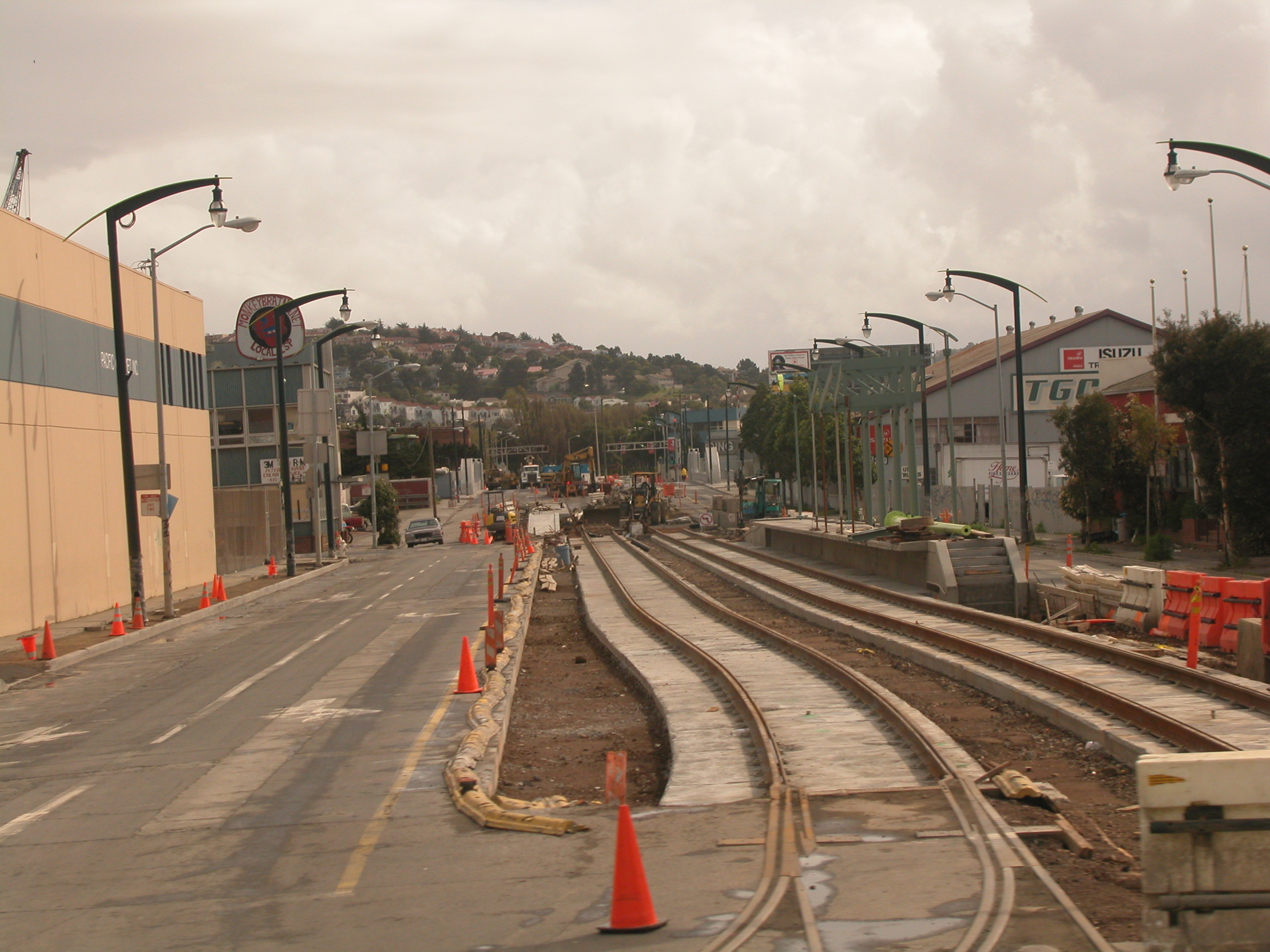
Construction in March 2005

Construction of the line was proposed in the late 1980s as plans for the redevelopment of the Mission Bay neighborhood were established. Construction took place in the mid-2000s. The line was constructed as the Third Street Light Rail Project. Testing on the line took place in summer 2006, with limited service starting on January 13, 2007, and full service beginning on April 7, 2007. T Third Street service was initially operated between Castro station and Sunnydale station. Following service changes on June 30, 2007, the T Third Street and the K Ingleside lines were interlined through the Market Street subway and Twin Peaks tunnels, resulting in a combined route from Balboa Park, through downtown, to the Visitacion Valley neighborhood.

The Mission Bay Loop project, which added a short turn loop using 18th, Illinois, and 19th, was constructed to supplement the Central Subway project. The loop was originally designed in 1998 as part of the Third Street Light Rail project, but was deferred due to insufficient funding. A $3.5 million construction contract was issued in 2014. Construction started in July 2016 and was completed in 2019. Another loop at 25th and Illinois is proposed to increase short-line service frequency between Downtown and Dogpatch.

=== Later changes ===
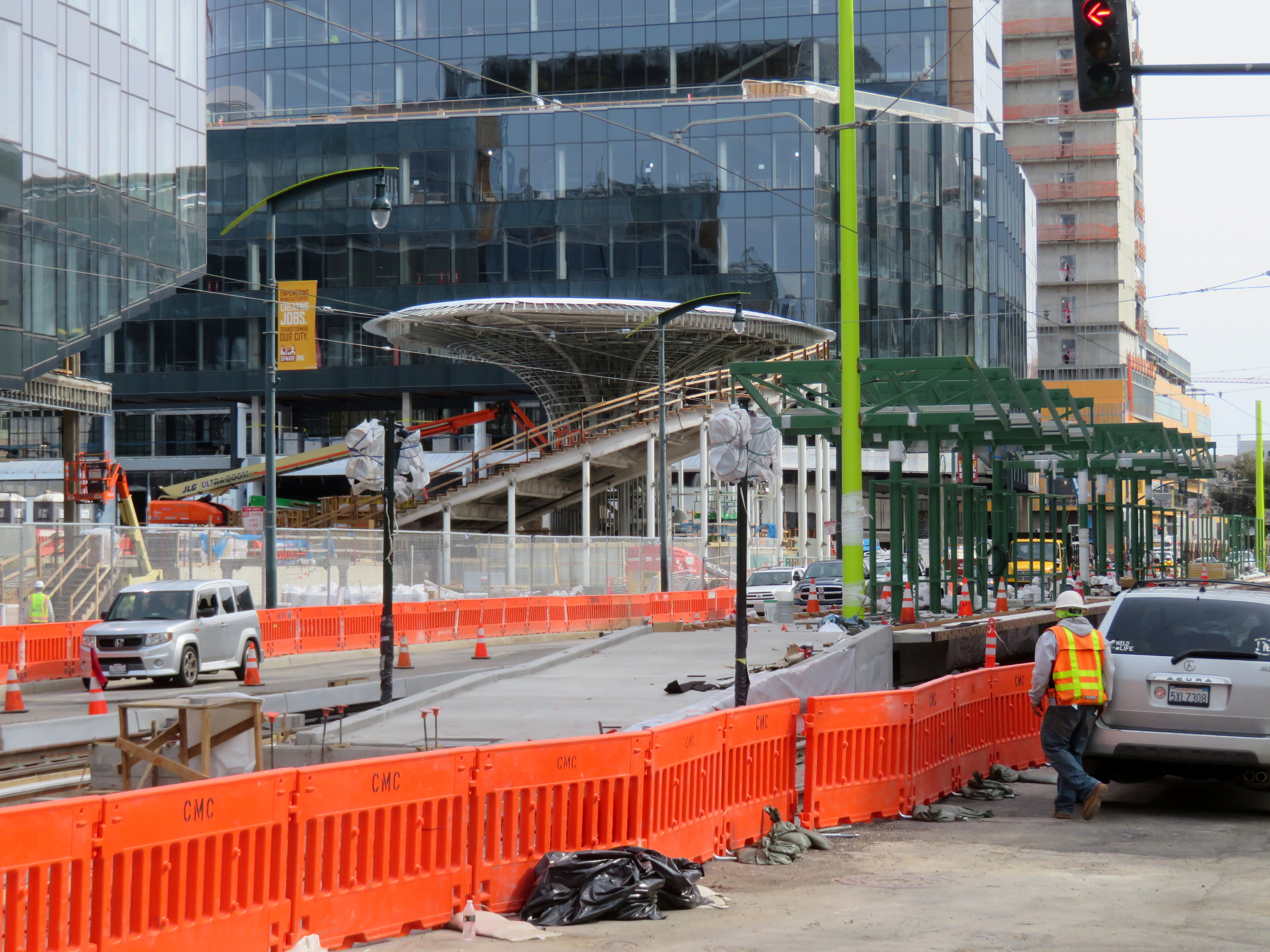
Construction of the new UCSF/Chase Center station in March 2019

The underground section of the line was closed west of Castro station from June 25 to August 24, 2018, due to the Twin Peaks Tunnel shutdown. On August 25, 2018, at the conclusion of the shutdown, Muni began running permanently two-car trains on the K/T line (as had been used east of Castro during the shutdown). The line was shut down again, from January 22, 2019, until April 1, 2019, for construction of a new platform at UCSF/Mission Bay station. In April 2019, the SFMTA ended the use of unscheduled short turns. These had been used to provide more consistent service on the inner portion of the line, but had caused inconsistent and less frequent service in the Hunters Point-Bayview and Visitacion Valley neighborhoods.

On March 30, 2020, Muni Metro service was replaced with buses due to the COVID-19 pandemic. Rail service returned on August 22, with the routes reconfigured to improve reliability in the subway. T Third Street and M Ocean View light rail lines were interlined, running between Sunnydale station and Balboa Park station. Light rail service was re-replaced with buses on August 25 due to issues with malfunctioning overhead wire splices and the need to quarantine control center staff after a COVID-19 case. Rail service resumed on the Embarcadero–Sunnydale section of the T Third Street line on January 23, 2021. In preparation for the return of rail service, several temporary changes were made at the 4th Street bridge over China Basin: one southbound lane became a transit-only lane, and a northbound turn lane at Berry (which shared space with the tracks) was removed. This change was found to decrease delays at the bridge by 60%. Service was re-extended to West Portal on May 15, again through-routed with the K Ingleside.

As part of the January 2021 service change, Muni also added the 15 Bayview-Hunters Point Express bus route. The route makes local stops in the Bayview–Hunters Point neighborhood east of Third Street and limited stops on Third Street paralleling the T.

=== Central Subway ===
The second phase of the line was built as the Central Subway, which forms a crosstown link between South of Market (SoMa) and Chinatown via Union Square. Voters approved the Central Subway in 2003, and the alignment was selected in 2008. Construction began in 2012. After numerous delays, the Central Subway opened on November 19, 2022, with a weekend-only shuttle service operating between Chinatown and 4th and Brannan. The T Third Street was rerouted to travel through the Central Subway for full service on January 7, 2023. Service runs every 10 minutes on weekdays and every 12 minutes on weekends. Shuttle trains signed "S Mission Bay" operate between Chinatown and UCSF/Chase Center for events at Chase Center.

The Central Subway was closed from February 26 to March 14, 2025, for water leakage mitigation at Chinatown station. T Third Street service was again interlined with K Ingleside service.

Diagrams of the various T Third Street routings over its history:

Initial alignment

2007–2023

2023–present

Notes
- E Embarcadero began service in 2015
- Mission Bay Loop opened, and UCSF Mission Bay and Mariposa renamed to UCSF/Chase Center and UCSF Medical Center in 2019

== Station listing ==
All stations along this line feature high platforms, eliminating the need for the raising and lowering of entrance and exit steps characteristic of other Muni Metro lines.

Station	Neighborhood	Other Muni Metro lines	Notes and Connections
Chinatown	Chinatown		Muni: 1, 8, 8AX, 8BX, 30, 45
Union Square/Market Street	Financial District	(at Powell)	Bay Area Rapid Transit: (at Powell); F Market & Wharves; Powell–Hyde, Powell–Mason; Muni: 5, 5R, 6, 7, 7X, 8, 8AX, 8BX, 9, 9R, 21, 27, 30, 31, 45, 81X, Geary BRT (38, 38R); Amtrak, Mission Bay Shuttle
Yerba Buena/Moscone	SoMa		Serves Yerba Buena Center for the Arts and Moscone Center; Muni: 8, 8AX, 8BX, 12, 30, 45
4th and Brannan	SoMa		Muni: 15, 30, 45
4th and King	Mission Bay	N Judah	Caltrain; Muni: 15, 30, 45; Mission Bay Shuttle: East, Transbay/Caltrain, West; Flixbus
Mission Rock	Mission Bay		
UCSF/Chase Center	Mission Bay		Serves the UCSF Mission Bay Campus and Chase Center; Muni: 15, 22, 78X, 79X; Mission Bay Shuttle: East, Transbay/Caltrain
UCSF Medical Center	Mission Bay		
20th Street	Dogpatch		Muni: 15, 48, 55
23rd Street	Dogpatch		Caltrain (at 22nd Street)
Marin Street	Bayview		
Evans	Bayview		Muni: 15, 19, 44
Hudson/Innes	Bayview		Muni: 44, 54
Kirkwood/La Salle	Bayview		Muni: 54
Oakdale/Palou	Bayview		Muni: 15, 23, 24, 44, 54
Revere/Shafter	Bayview		Muni: 54
Williams	Bayview		Muni: 54
Carroll	Bayview		
Gilman/Paul	Bayview		Muni: 29
Le Conte	Bayview		
Arleta	Visitacion Valley		Caltrain (at Bayshore); Muni: 8, 8AX, 8BX, 9, 9R, 56; SamTrans: 292, 397
Sunnydale	Visitacion Valley		Muni: 9, 9R; SamTrans: 292, 397
