= UCSF/Chase Center station =

Muni Metro light rail station in San Francisco

UCSF/Chase Center
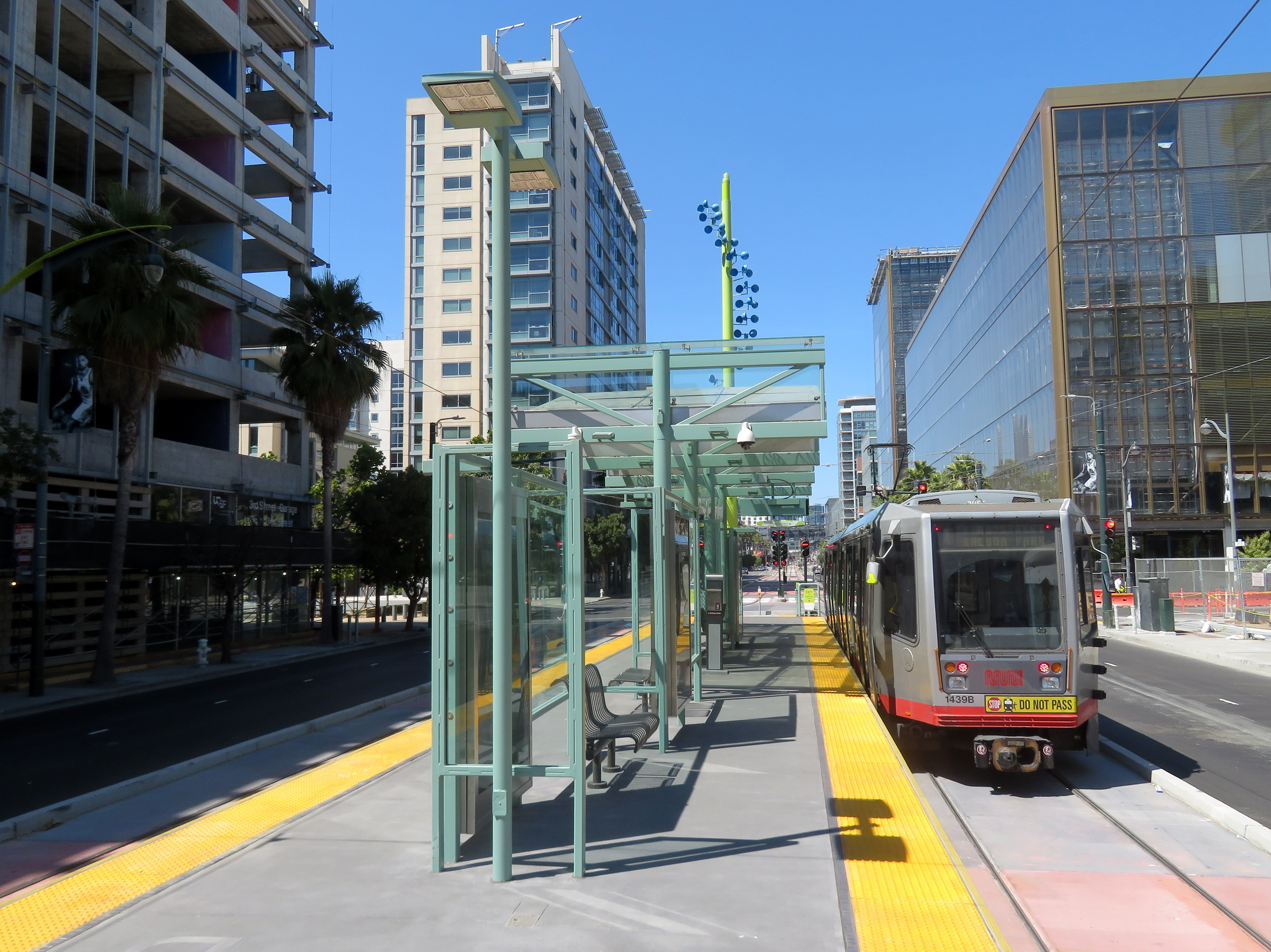
- A northbound train at the station in August 2019

General information
- Other names: 16th Street
- Location: Third Street at South Street; San Francisco, California
- Coordinates: 37.768823°N 122.389289°W
- Platforms: 1 island platform
- Tracks: 2
- Connections: Muni: 15, 22, 78X, 79X; Mission Bay Shuttle: East, Transbay/Caltrain

Construction
- Cycle facilities: Bay Wheels station
- Accessible: Yes

History
- Opened: January 13, 2007
- Rebuilt: November 12, 2018–August 6, 2019
- Former names: UCSF/Mission Bay (until 2018)

Services
Preceding station	Muni	Following station
Mission Rock toward Chinatown	T Third Street	UCSF Medical Center toward Sunnydale
Location

UCSF/Chase Center station (formerly known as UCSF/Mission Bay) is a light rail station on the Muni Metro T Third Street line, located in the median of Third Street at South Street in the Mission Bay neighborhood of San Francisco, California. The station serves the UCSF Mission Bay campus and the Chase Center arena. The station opened with the T Third Street line on January 13, 2007. Its original configuration had two side platforms; the northbound platform was north of South Street, and the southbound platform south of South Street. The station was closed from November 2018 to August 2019 for conversion to a single island platform to better serve the Chase Center which opened in September 2019.

The station is also served by Muni bus routes 15 and 22, along with 78X and 79X which provide service to Chase Center and run only before and after events at the arena. The T Bus and 91 Owl bus routes provide service along the T Third Street line during the early morning and late night hours respectively when trains do not operate. Additionally, the non-profit Mission Bay Transportation Management Association operates two shuttles, the East and Transbay/Caltrain routes.

== Reconstruction ==
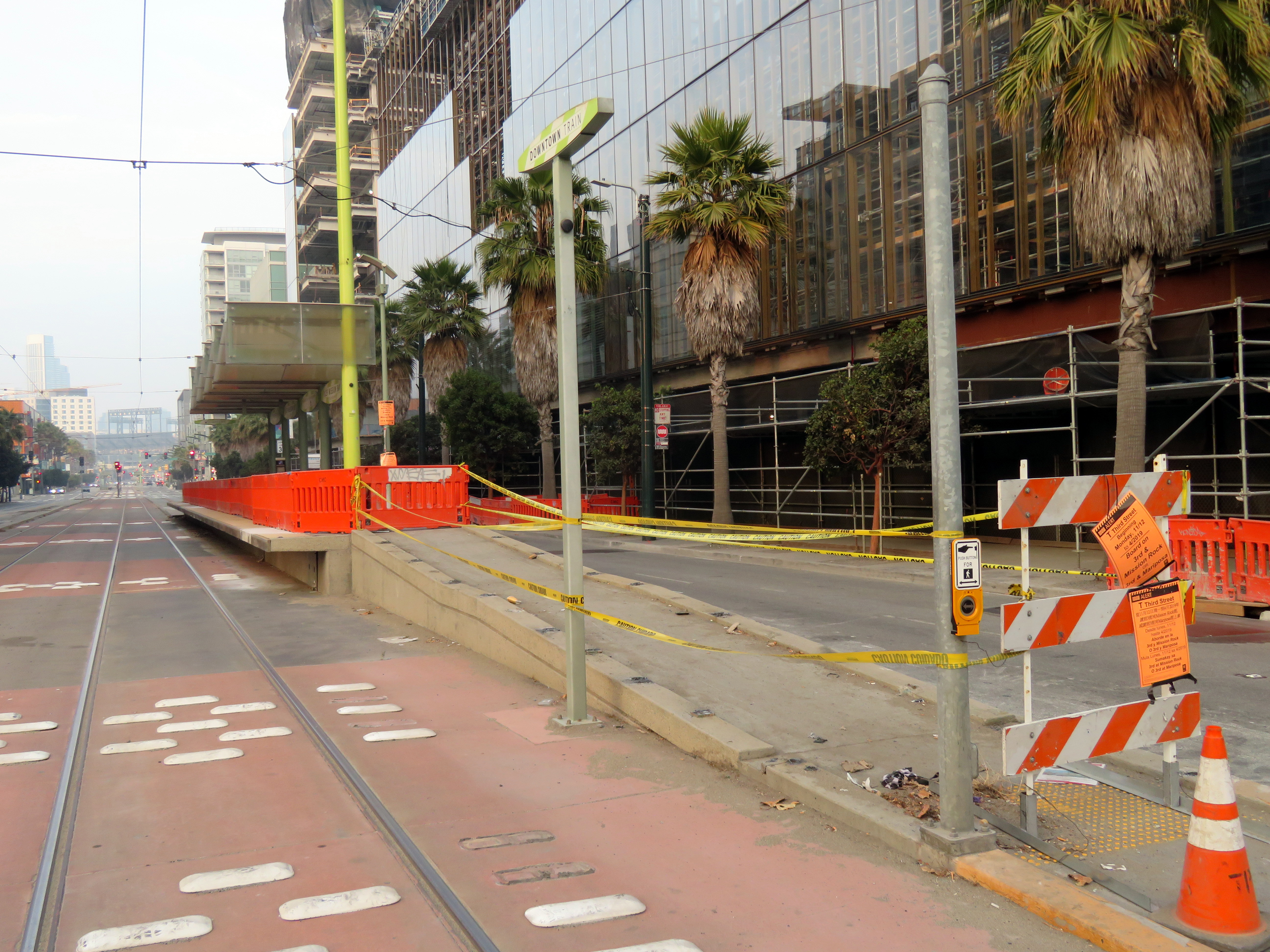
The closed northbound platform in November 2018

The station serves the adjacent Chase Center arena, which opened on September 6, 2019. It was expanded to accommodate high ridership and increased service on game days. Initial plans in mid-2015 called for the northbound platform to be doubled in length to 320 feet (98 m). Later that year, a variant design with a 320-foot (98 m)-long island platform south of South Street was proposed, which would allow two two-car trains in each direction to simultaneously serve the station. Construction of either design was expected to take 14 months and included the installation of a crossover to allow trains to reverse direction at the station. In October 2015, the team, city, and UCSF reached a preliminary agreement under which the city and UCSF supported the construction of the arena, in exchange for a package of transportation improvements which include the expanded station and the purchase of four additional light rail vehicles.

Bidding on the new center platform opened in December 2017, with the price estimated at $27 million. After bids came in higher than expected, Muni awarded a $33 million construction contract in March 2018. The track work is expected to cost an additional $18 million. By March 2018, Muni funding for the project was short by $17.6 million; the agency indicated plans to borrow money from the city against arena revenues to cover the shortfall.

The station was closed from November 12, 2018, to August 6, 2019, for the reconstruction. The line was shut down from January 22, 2019, until April 1, 2019, for platform construction. On May 7, 2019, the SFMTA Board voted to rename the station to UCSF/Chase Center after the Golden State Warriors agreed to reimburse the $140,000 cost of new signage and maps.
