= 4th and Brannan station =

Light rail station in San Francisco, California, US

Fourth/Brannan
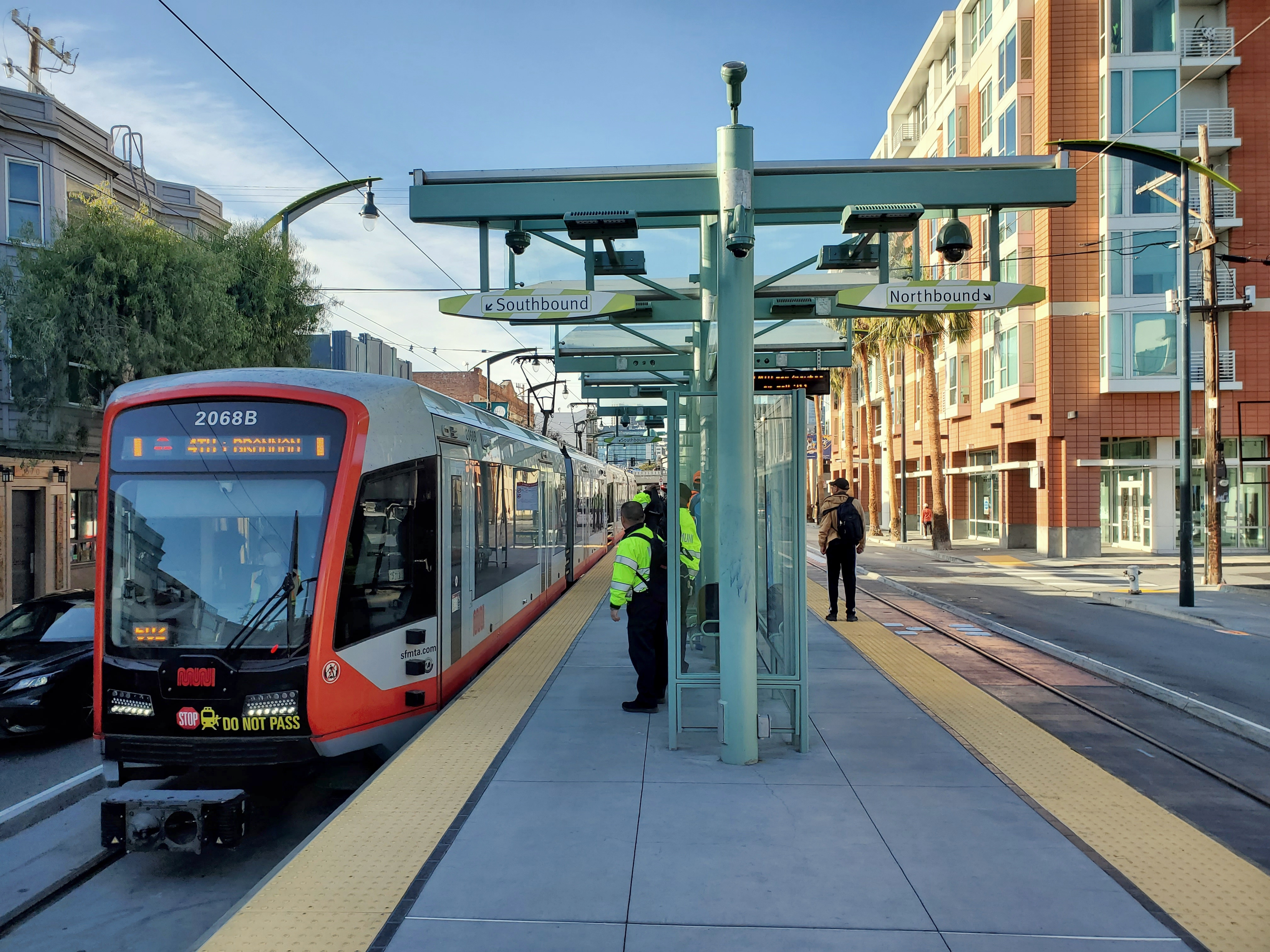
- A train at 4th and Brannan station in November 2022

General information
- Location: 4th Street at Brannan Street; San Francisco, California
- Coordinates: 37.778272°N 122.396512°W
- Platforms: 1 island platform
- Tracks: 2
- Connections: Muni: 15, 30, 45

Construction
- Accessible: Yes

History
- Opened: November 19, 2022

Services
Preceding station	Muni	Following station
Yerba Buena/Moscone toward Chinatown	T Third Street	4th and King toward Sunnydale
Location

4th and Brannan station is an at-grade Muni Metro light rail station located in the median of 4th Street at Brannan Street in the South of Market (SoMa) district of San Francisco, California. It opened on November 19, 2022, as part of the Central Subway project. The station is served by the T Third Street line which runs between Chinatown and Sunnydale.

== Service ==
The station has a single island platform in the median of 4th Street, with a ramp leading to Brannan Street. Originally, the station was designed with an exclusive train-only lane on the platform's eastern side and a mixed traffic lane on the western side. The station was subsequently redesigned with exclusive lanes on both sides of the platform, enabling trains to proceed faster through the 4th and Bryant intersection preceding the station.

The station is also served by Muni bus routes 15, 30 and 45, plus the T Bus and 91 Owl bus routes, which provide service along the T Third Street line during the early morning and late night hours respectively when trains do not operate.

The Central Subway, including 4th and Brannan, was closed from February 26 to March 14, 2025, for water leakage mitigation at Chinatown station.

== Station design ==
A stainless steel kinetic sculpture by Moto Ohtake, entitled Microcosmic, was installed at the station in November 2019 — the first of ten artworks to be installed at Central Subway stations. The moving portion is approximately 14 by 17 feet (4.3 m × 5.2 m) and sits atop a 40-foot (12 m) high pole, featuring 31 rotating points.
