= Chinatown station (Muni Metro) =

Subway station in San Francisco, California, US

Chinatown–Rose Pak 華埠–白蘭站
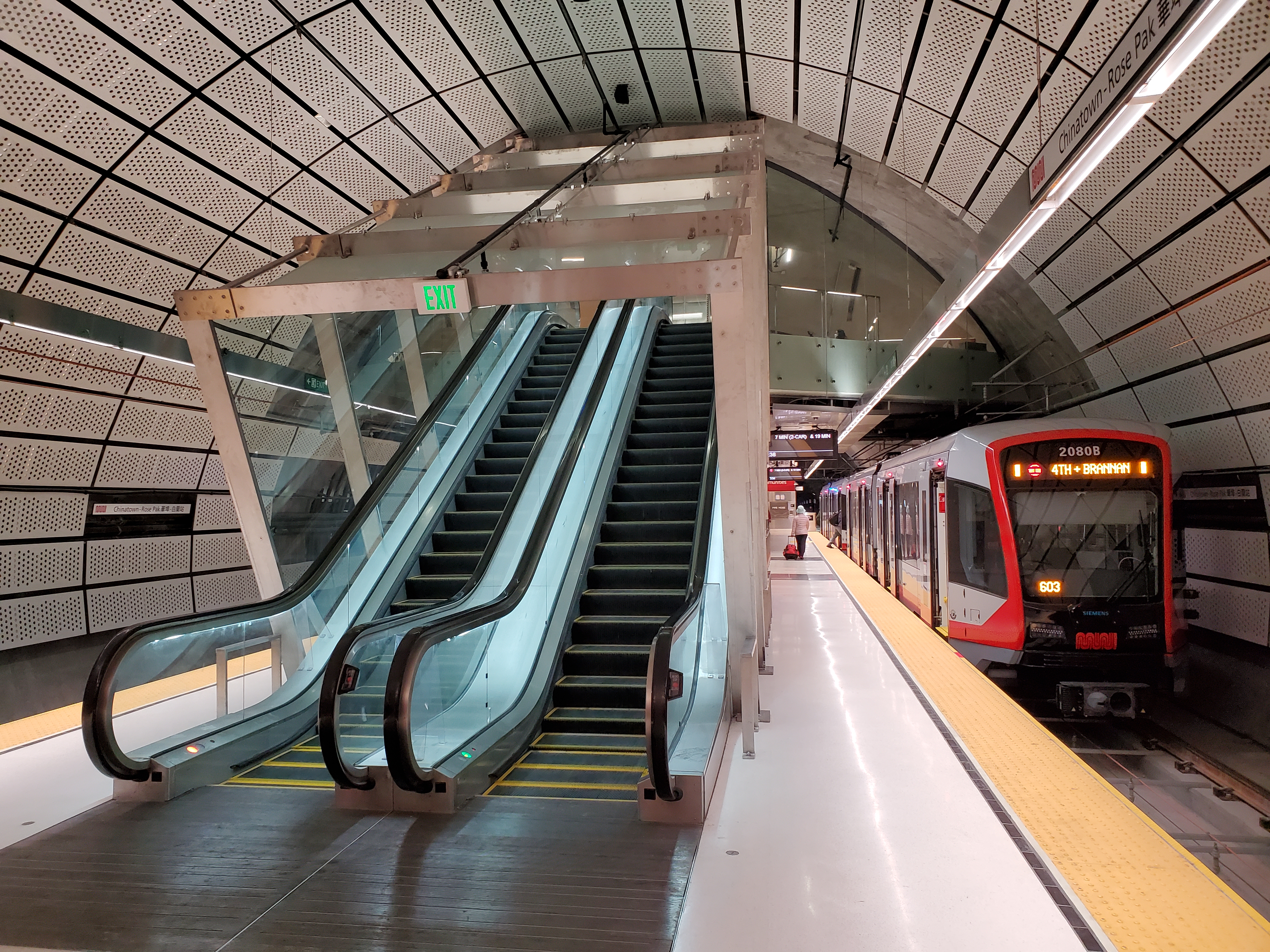
- A train at Chinatown station in November 2022

General information
- Location: Stockton Street and Washington Street; San Francisco, California
- Coordinates: 37.794806°N 122.408082°W
- Line: Central Subway
- Platforms: 1 island platform
- Tracks: 2
- Connections: Muni: 1, 8, 8AX, 8BX, 30, 45; Powell–Hyde, Powell–Mason

Construction
- Structure type: Underground
- Accessible: Yes

History
- Opened: November 19, 2022

Passengers
- February 2023: 1,168 daily boardings

Services
Preceding station	Muni	Following station
Terminus	T Third Street	Union Square/Market Street toward Sunnydale
Location

Chinatown station (officially Chinatown–Rose Pak station) (Note: Chinese: 華埠–白蘭站; pinyin: Huábù–báilánzhàn; Jyutping: Waa4 fau6–baak6 laan4 zaam6; Yale romanization: Wàh fauh–baahk làan zaahm) is an underground Muni Metro light rail station, located under Stockton Street at Washington Street in the Chinatown neighborhood of San Francisco, California. It opened on November 19, 2022, as part of the Central Subway project. The station's official name honors Rose Pak, a political activist in the Chinatown community who helped secure support and funding for the station and the extension of the T Third Street line.

== Design and service ==
Chinatown station was designed by Kwan Henmi, now DLR Group. It includes retail space at the ground level, and rooftop patio. The station structure extends 100 feet (30 m) below ground and required the deepest building excavation in the City of San Francisco. The underground station features a 5,400 square feet (500 m^{2}) public plaza on its roof, only the fifth open space park in the Chinatown neighborhood. San Francisco Chronicle architecture critic John King called Chinatown "the best architectural experience, bottom to top", of the Central Subway stations. King complimented the design of the platform level and the "spacious" headhouse.

The station is also served by Muni bus routes 1, 8, 30 and 45, plus two weekday peak hours express services, the 8AX and 8BX. Additionally, the T Bus and 91 Owl bus routes, which provide service along the T Third Street line during the early morning and late night hours respectively when trains do not operate. The Powell-Hyde and Powell-Mason lines of the San Francisco cable car system stop at Powell and Washington Streets, one block west of the station.

=== Station artwork ===
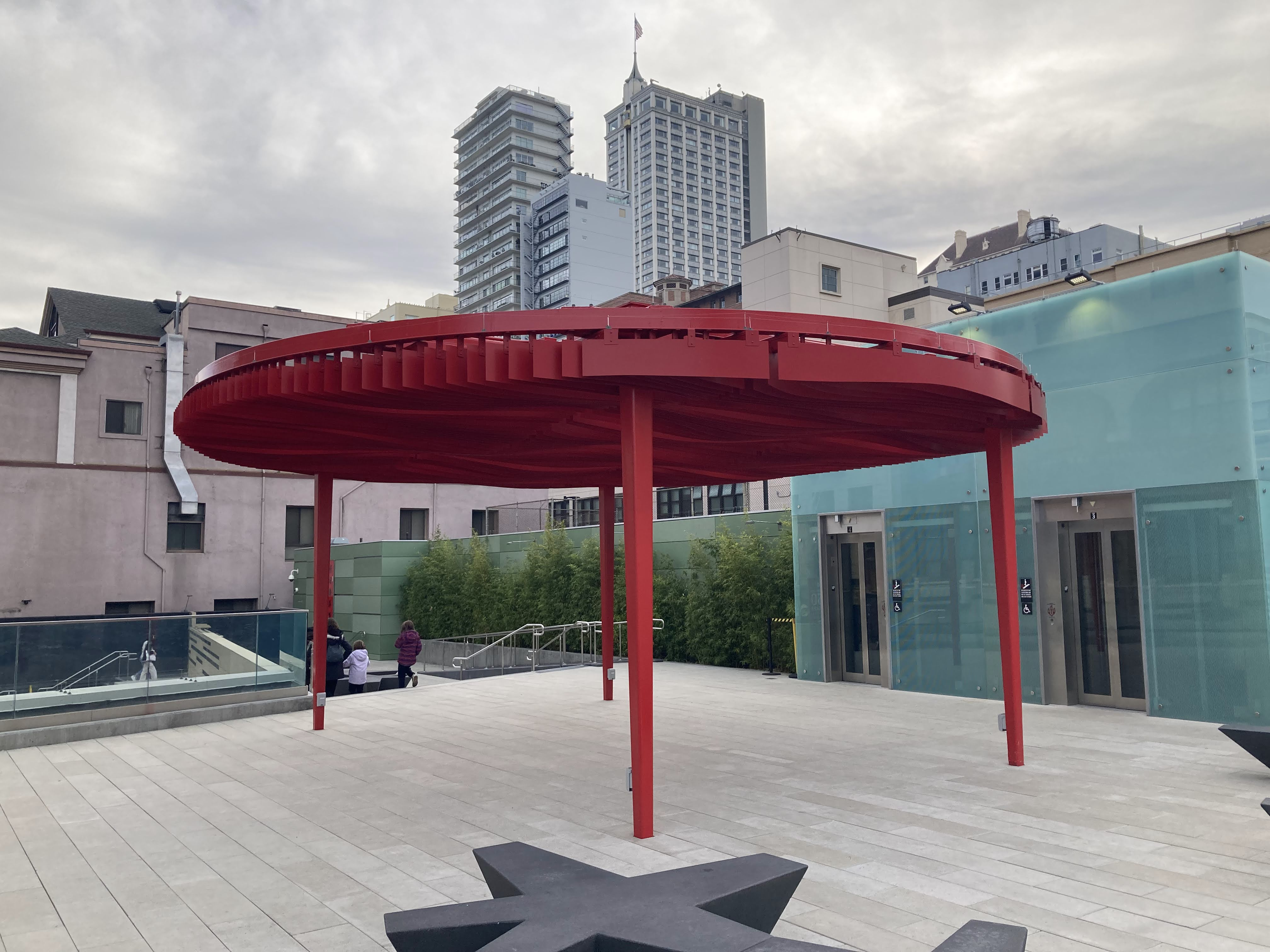
Rooftop plaza of the station

Of the ten artworks installed for the Central Subway, three are located at Chinatown station:

- Yang Ge Dance of Northeast China by Yumei Hou consists of two large-scale red-painted laser-cut metal panels, based on traditional Chinese paper cutting, featuring folk heroes and inspired by the traditional Yingge dance. One is 16 by 37 feet (4.9 m × 11.3 m) in the mezzanine landing; the other is 30 by 35 feet (9.1 m × 10.7 m) in the ticketing hall.
- Urban Archaeology by Tomie Arai is a large mural on the headhouse wall, measuring 100 feet (30 m) and varying in height between 4–9 feet (1.2–2.7 m), featuring images of the life and history of the Chinatown area rendered in architectural glass.
- A Sense of Community by Clare Rojas is a large tile mural based on Chinese textile samples arranged in a Cathedral Quilting pattern. Located on the cavern wall on the mezzanine level, it forms a semicircle measuring approximately 35 by 14 1/2 feet (10.7 m × 4.4 m)

"One Hundred Years: History of the Chinese in America", a mural painted by James Leong originally for the Ping Yuen housing project in Chinatown, was enlarged, printed, and wrapped in 2012 around the Hogan & Vest building prior to that building's demolition. Three temporary artworks were also displayed on the construction site fence: Panorama by Kota Ezawa in 2013–14, Sight Plan by Maria Park in 2016–17, and Procession by Jason Jägel in 2017.

In 2016, the Chinatown Community Development Center held a contest to write a couplet to welcome visitors to Chinatown. The winning couplet would be written in calligraphy and printed on red opaque glass at the Chinatown station plaza. Carin Mui (Chinese: 黃立慈) submitted the winning entry, 昔日漂洋採金礦，今朝劈地鋳銀龍, which translates to "In the past we traveled across the Pacific to mine for gold; Now, we break through earth to form a silver dragon."

== History ==
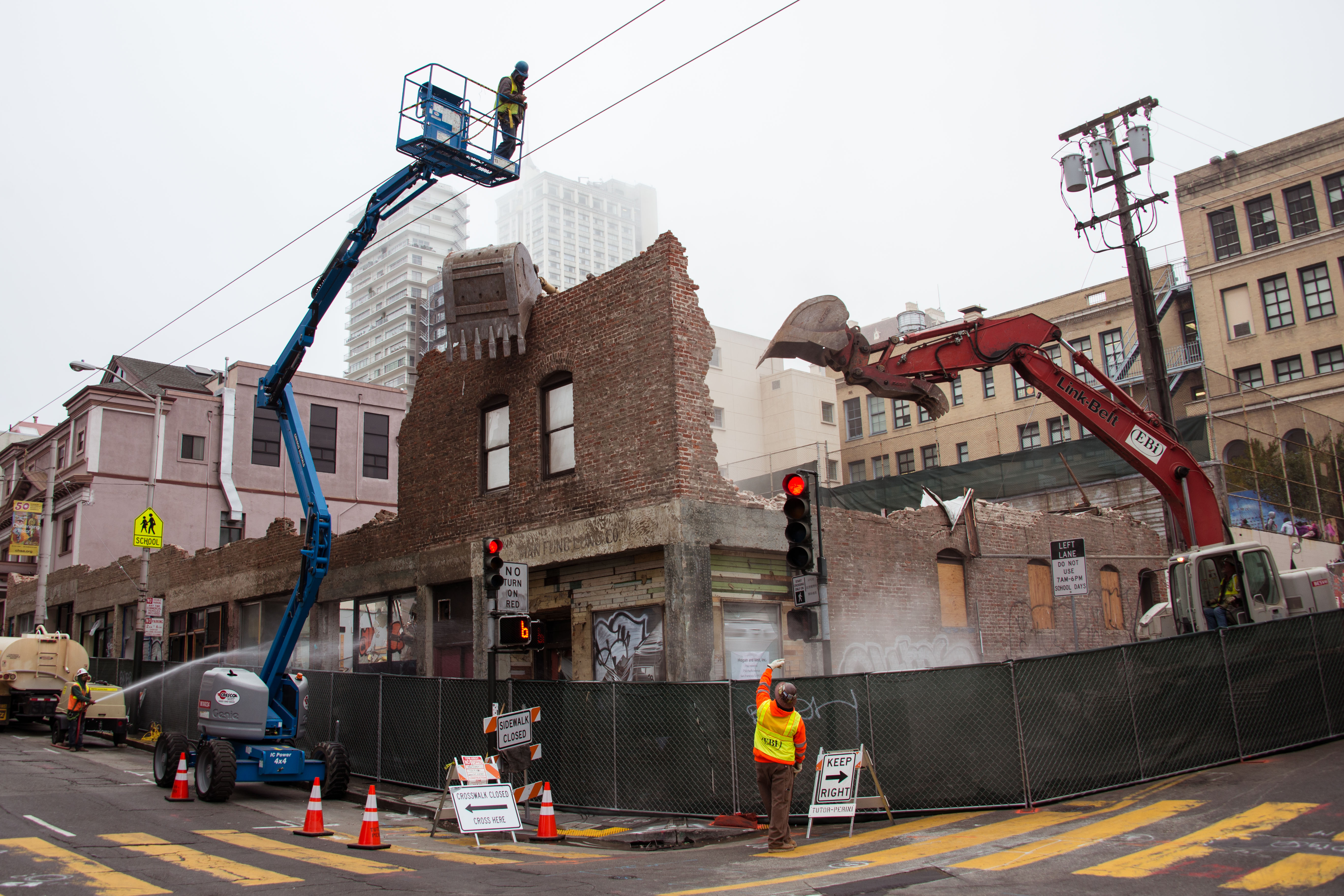
Demolition of the 933–949 Stockton Street building in 2013

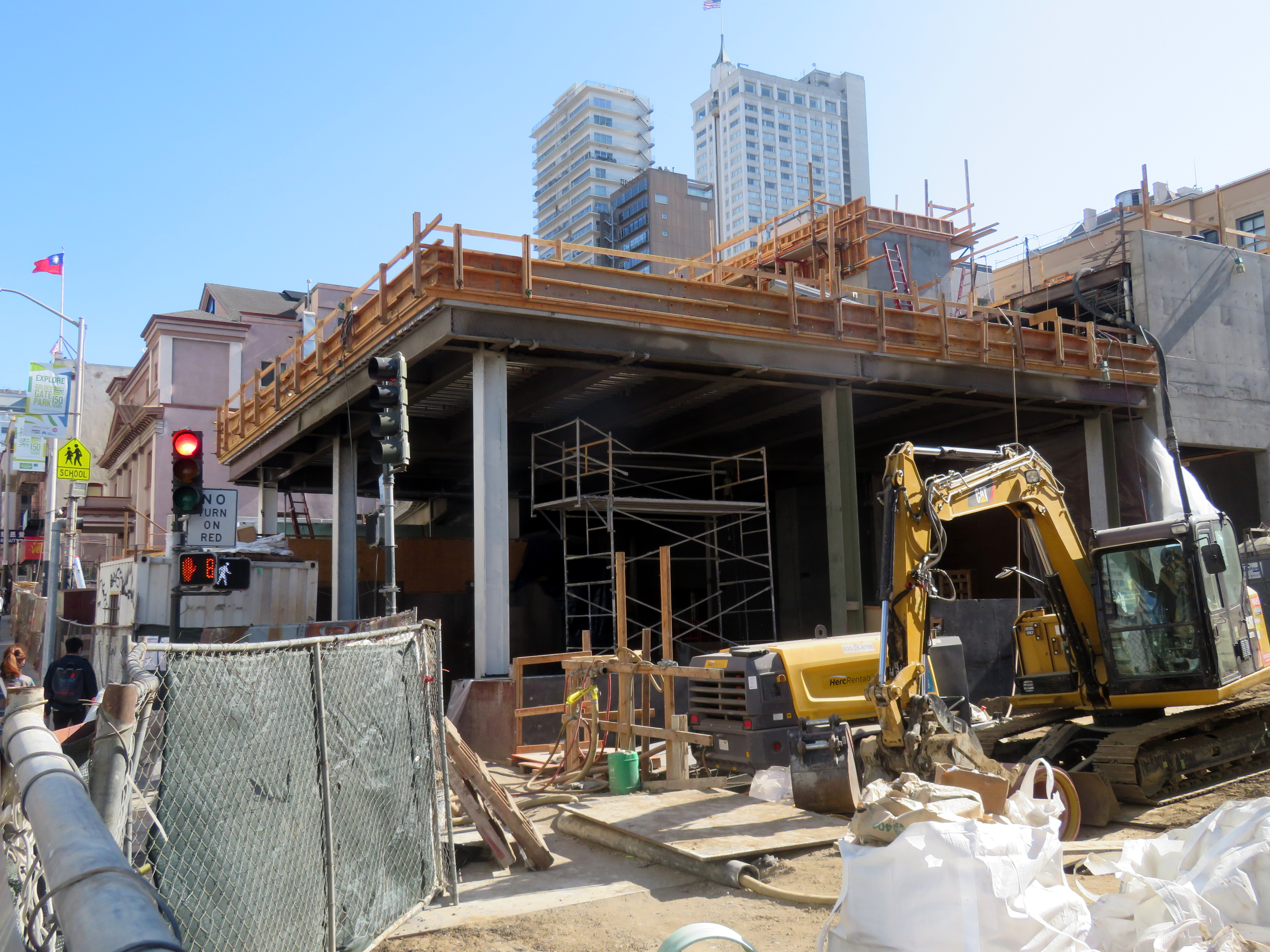
Headhouse under construction in 2020

The building at 933–949 Stockton, which housed 56 low-income residents, was acquired by eminent domain and demolished to make way for the new Chinatown station. As required by law, the residents were relocated to a new building at Broadway and Sansome built with the help of city and state grants, including $8 million from the San Francisco Municipal Transportation Agency (SFMTA).

In July 2017, it was reported that delays on the construction schedule of Chinatown station associated with excavation techniques intended to permit Stockton Street to remain open during construction had propagated through the entire Central Subway construction schedule and the anticipated opening date for the system would slip by ten months. Although Stockton remained open since construction began in 2013, a half-block stretch of Washington Street has been closed, exacerbating existing traffic and parking issues and depressing local business revenues. The ten-month delay meant the anticipated completion date slipped from December 26, 2018, to November 14, 2019. A follow-up report noted the schedule had continued to slip to an anticipated completion date of December 10, 2019, and warned the schedule may continue to slip by several more months. In June, Mayor Ed Lee directed $500,000 to the Office of Economic and Workforce Development to aid Chinatown merchants whose business traffic had slowed from Central Subway construction.

SFMTA announced that excavation for Chinatown station was complete in April 2018. With excavation complete, station construction was set to begin, and the estimated completion date was mid-2019 for a scheduled December 2019 start of revenue service. It ultimately opened on November 19, 2022, with a weekend-only shuttle service between Chinatown and 4th and Brannan. Regular T Third Street service moved to the Central Subway on January 7, 2023.

The platform stairs and part of the platform were temporarily closed on August 3, 2023, due to a water leak. Repairs, which would involve injecting a filler material behind the station's waterproof shell, were expected to take six months. The Central Subway was closed from February 26 to March 14, 2025, for further water leakage mitigation at the station.

=== Naming ===
The San Francisco Board of Supervisors passed a resolution in October 2016 asking SFMTA to officially rename the station in honor of Rose Pak, a political activist in the Chinatown community who died the previous month. Supporters cited Pak's influence over the Central Subway project, which was meant in part to bring traffic back to Chinatown that had been lost following the damage and eventual demolition of the Embarcadero Freeway after the 1989 Loma Prieta earthquake. This was controversial, with opponents calling Pak a spy for the Chinese government and an enemy of the Falun Gong movement.

The SFMTA originally demurred the proposal, making an official policy in December 2016 to name stations after geographical destinations, not people. On August 20, 2019, the SFMTA Board in a 4–3 vote then approved the proposal to officially rename the station after Pak.
