= Stockton Street (San Francisco) =

Street in San Francisco, California, US

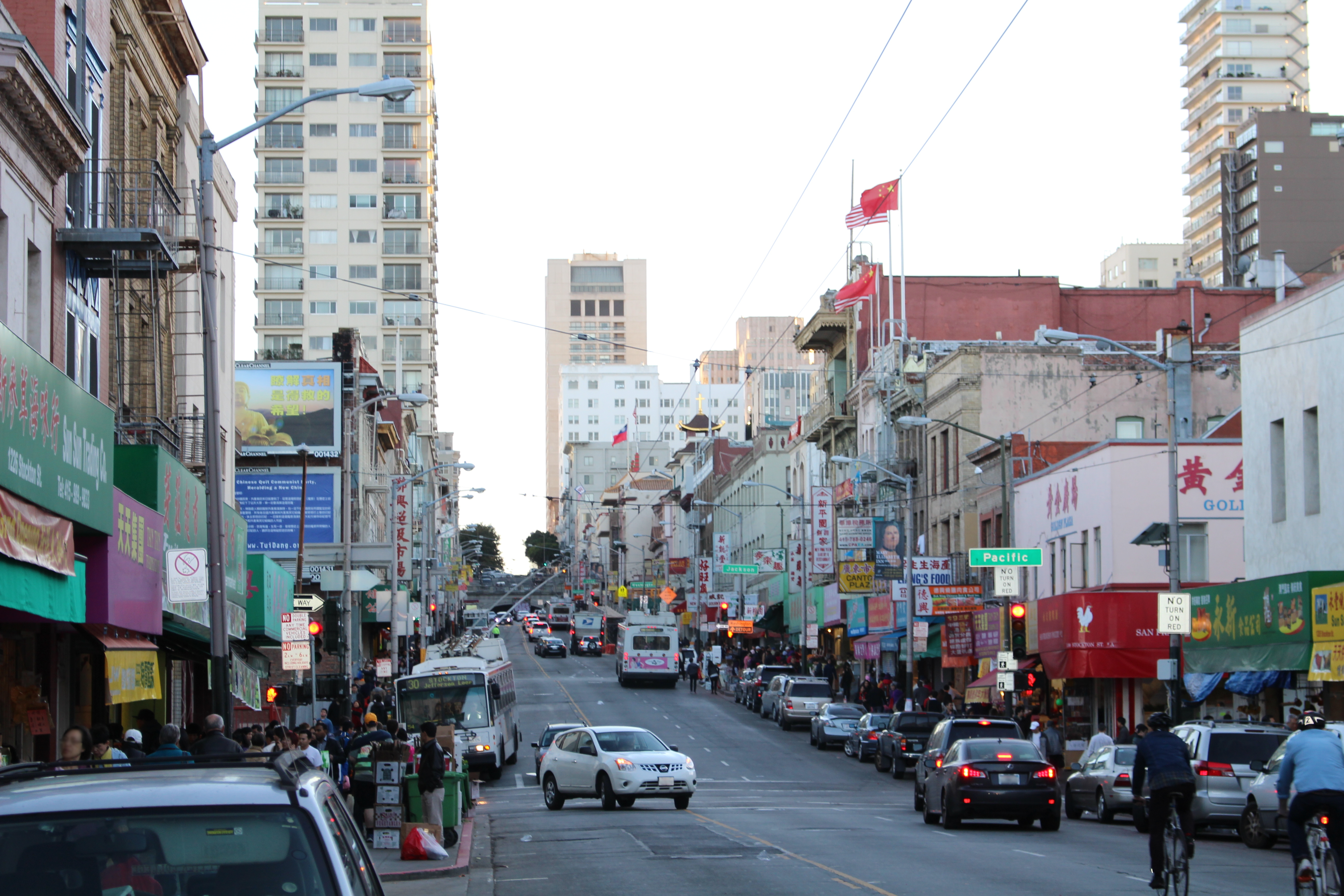
- Stockton Street in Chinatown, viewed south from Broadway, with two Muni trolleybuses, and the mound of the Stockton tunnel in the far background.
- Interactive map of Stockton Street
- Namesake: Robert F. Stockton
- South end: Market
- North end: Beach

Other
- Known for: Major shopping district for Chinatown

Stockton Street is a north-south street in San Francisco. It begins at Market Street passing Union Square, a major shopping district in the city. It then runs underground for about two and a half blocks in Stockton Street Tunnel (lending its name to a separate, parallel street above the tunnel), passes through Chinatown and North Beach (Little Italy), and ends at Beach Street near the Pier 39 shopping center and tourist attraction.

== Chinatown ==
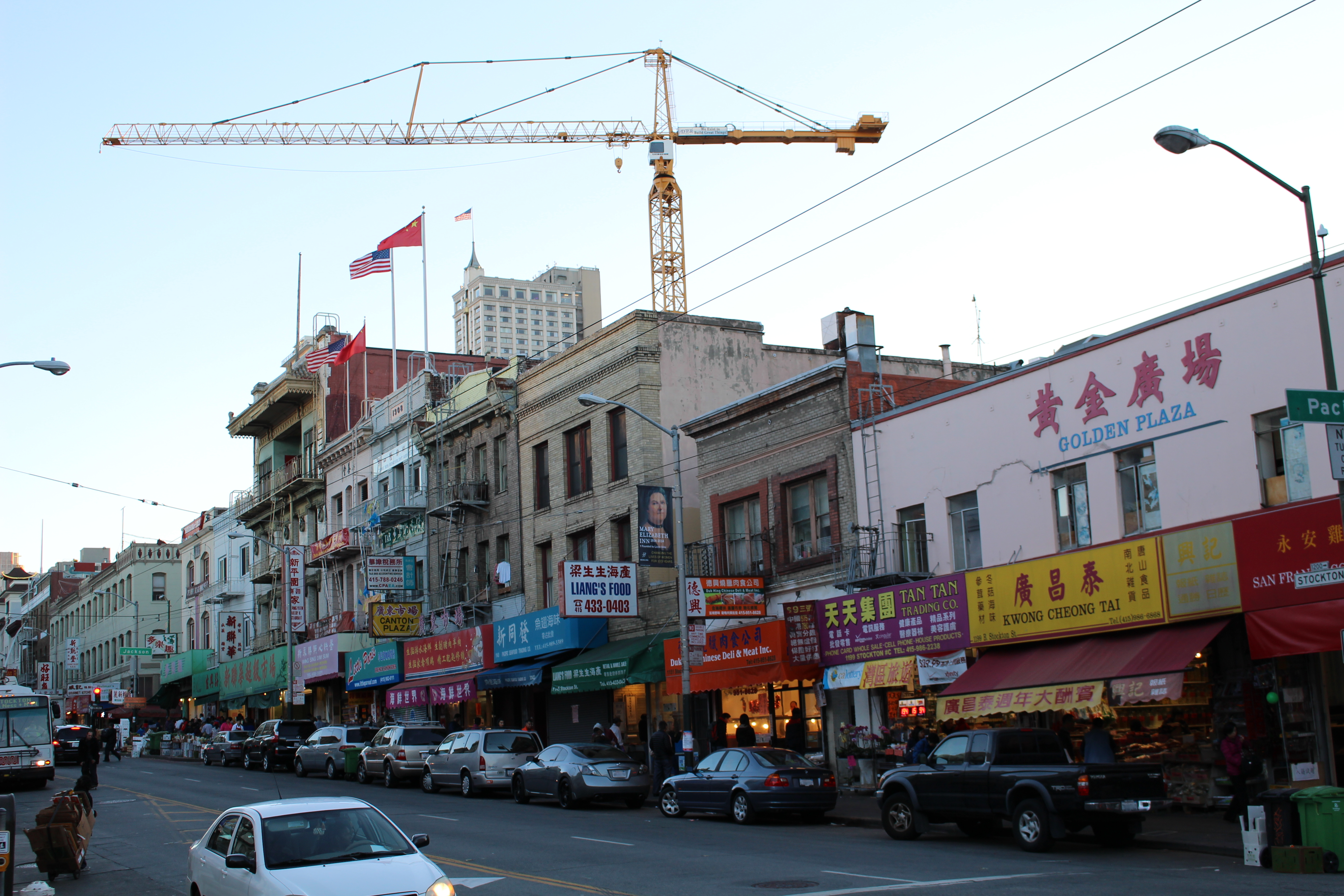
Commercial heart of Chinatown (2014)

In Chinatown (particularly in the three blocks between Washington Street and Broadway), Stockton is the neighborhood's main shopping and business street, where locals buy the freshest and cheapest produce and meats. The stores also offer live seafood (mainly on the west side of the street) and dried herbs. Some shops located on Stockton Street include the Hop Hing Ginseng Company, the Kowloon Market, the Luen Sing Fish Market, Louie's Produce, and Fruit City. In the annual Stockton Street market, vendors have been permitted since 2012 to set up outdoor stands during the two weeks before Chinese New Year.

SPUR has described Stockton Street in Chinatown as "an example of true urbanization, replete with a strong transit network, multigenerational families living in tightly knit spaces, hundreds of mom-and-pop stores and a bustling streetlife" and a success of "grassroots organizing to protect Chinatown’s affordability, culture and urban form". In this area, Stockton Street is dominated by mixed-use buildings that are three to four stories high, with shops on the ground floor and residential apartments upstairs. It is also home to organizations that played important political roles in the history of the Chinese immigrant community, in particular the Chinese Consolidated Benevolent Association (Six Companies), the Chinese American Citizens Alliance, and the US headquarters of the Kuomintang.

After immigration laws were eased in the mid-1960s, many stores moved to Stockton Street from nearby Grant Avenue, drawn by lower rents and the better transportation enabled by the 30 Stockton Muni trolleybus line (which replaced the earlier F Stockton streetcar line). The 45 Union/Stockton Muni trolleybus line also serves Stockton Street. The San Francisco Chronicle has called the section of Stockton Street between Sacramento and Broadway "San Francisco’s most interesting street ... fascinating [but] not beautiful. It’s crowded, untidy, dirty, usually noisy."

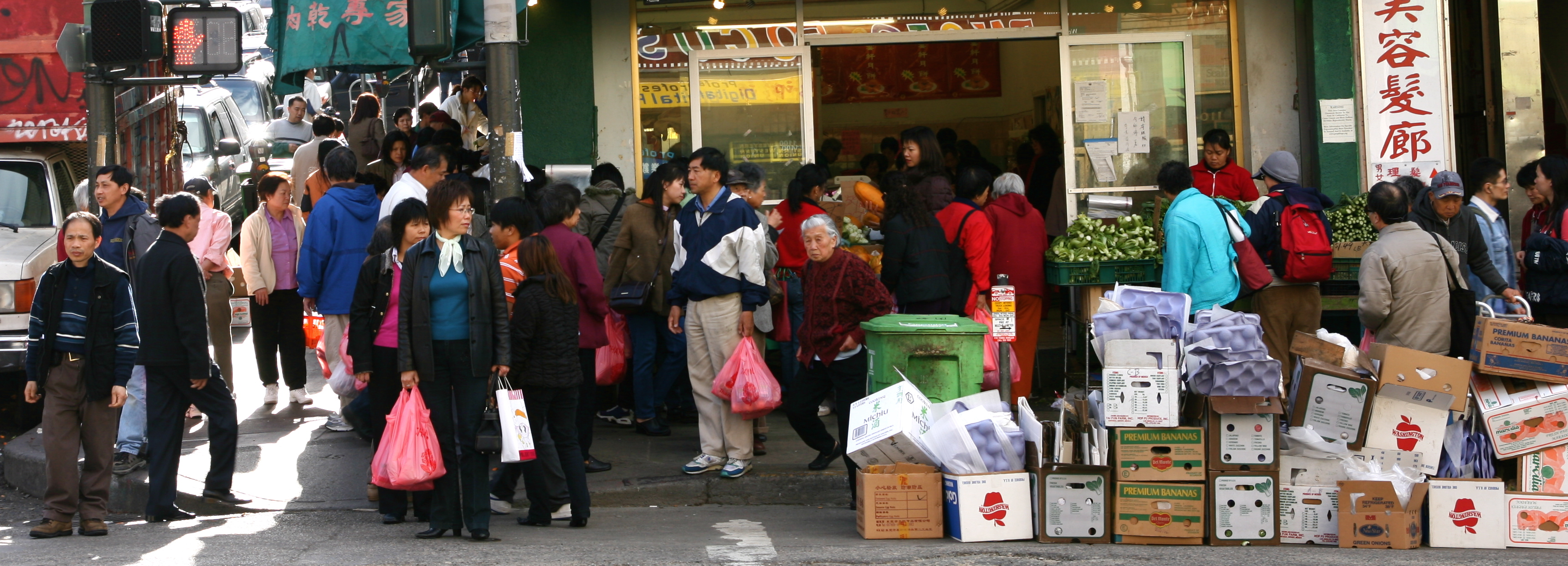
People shopping at the corner of Stockton and Jackson (2007)

== Union Square ==
In the Union Square area, Stockton Street is home to numerous upscale stores, including the Macy's Union Square and Neiman Marcus department stores. The block next to Macy's has been closed to road traffic since 2012 due to the Central Subway construction work, with the success of a temporary "Winter Walk" plaza lending support for calls to convert it into a pedestrian zone permanently. In 2016 (shortly before her death), influential Chinatown community organizer Rose Pak vehemently opposed this project arguing that Stockton Street was a "vital link" for Chinatown, and threatened to organize a blockade of City Hall by thousands of vehicles if the idea came to pass.

Stockton reopened to road traffic on February 22, 2019.

== Other notable landmarks ==
Near the Northern tip of the street, the Academy of Art University owns and operates a building for academic and administrative purposes.

== Gallery ==
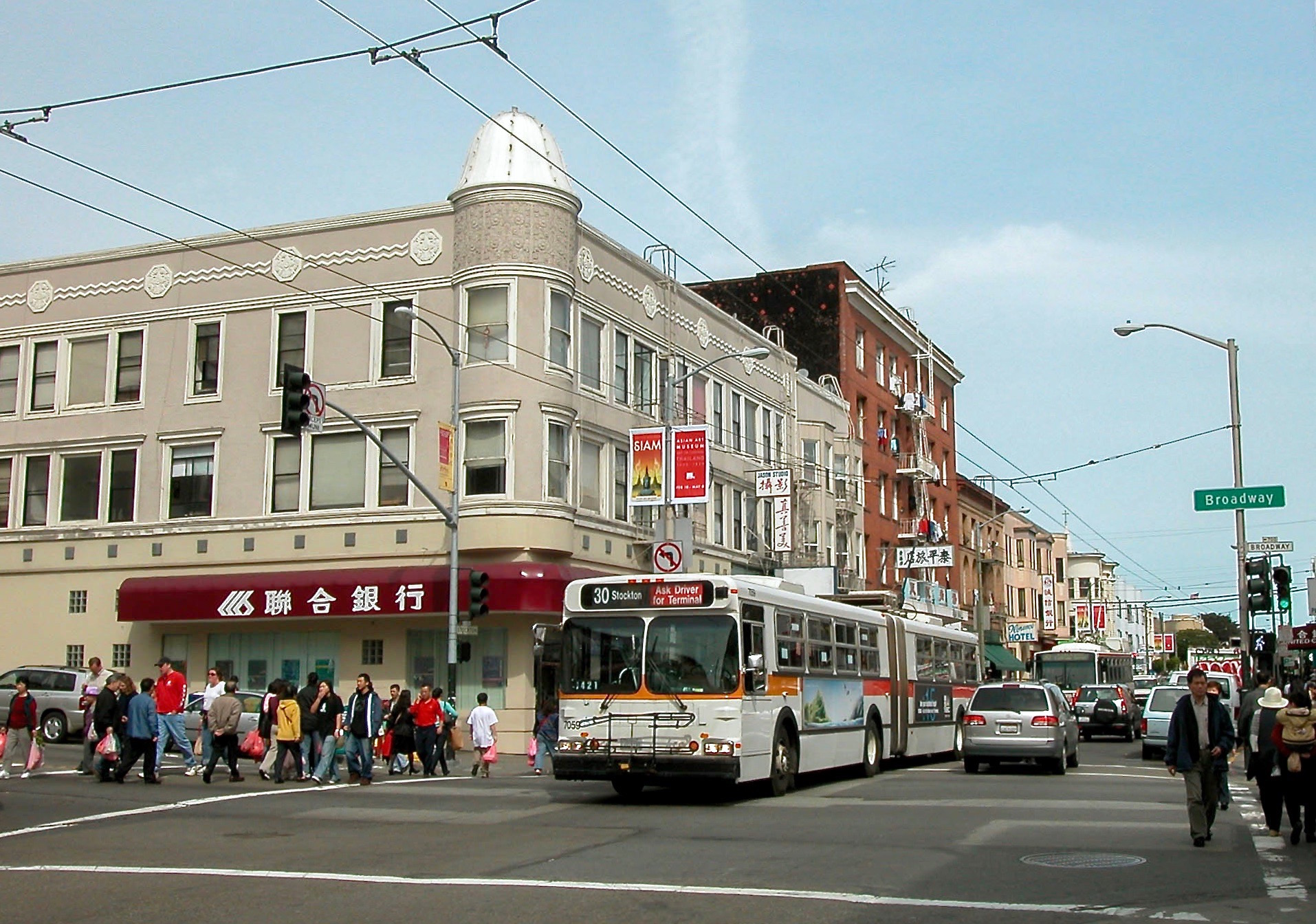
Intersection of Stockton and Broadway with a 30-Stockton trolleybus (2005)

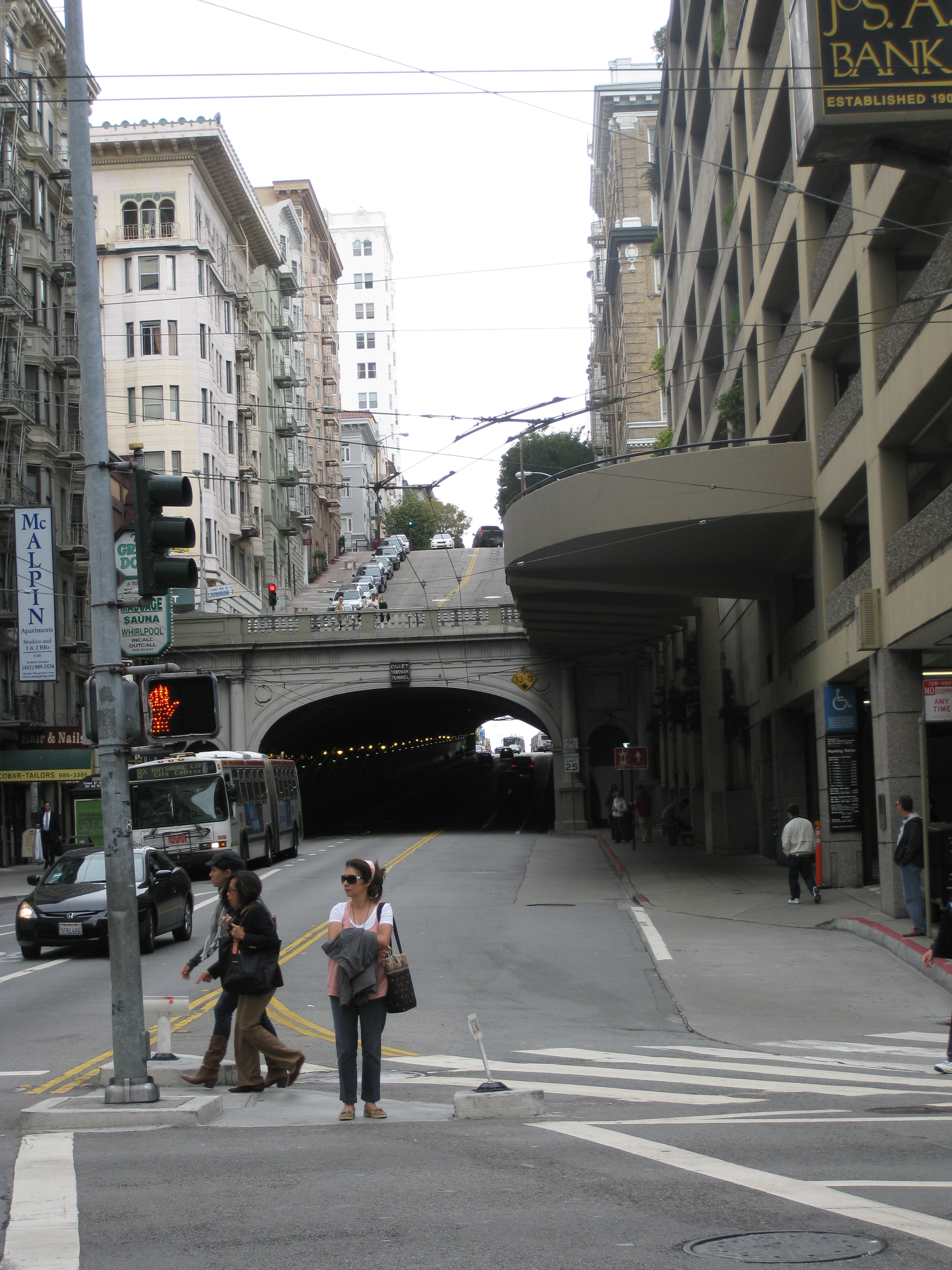
South portal of the Stockton Street Tunnel near Lower Nob Hill (2010)

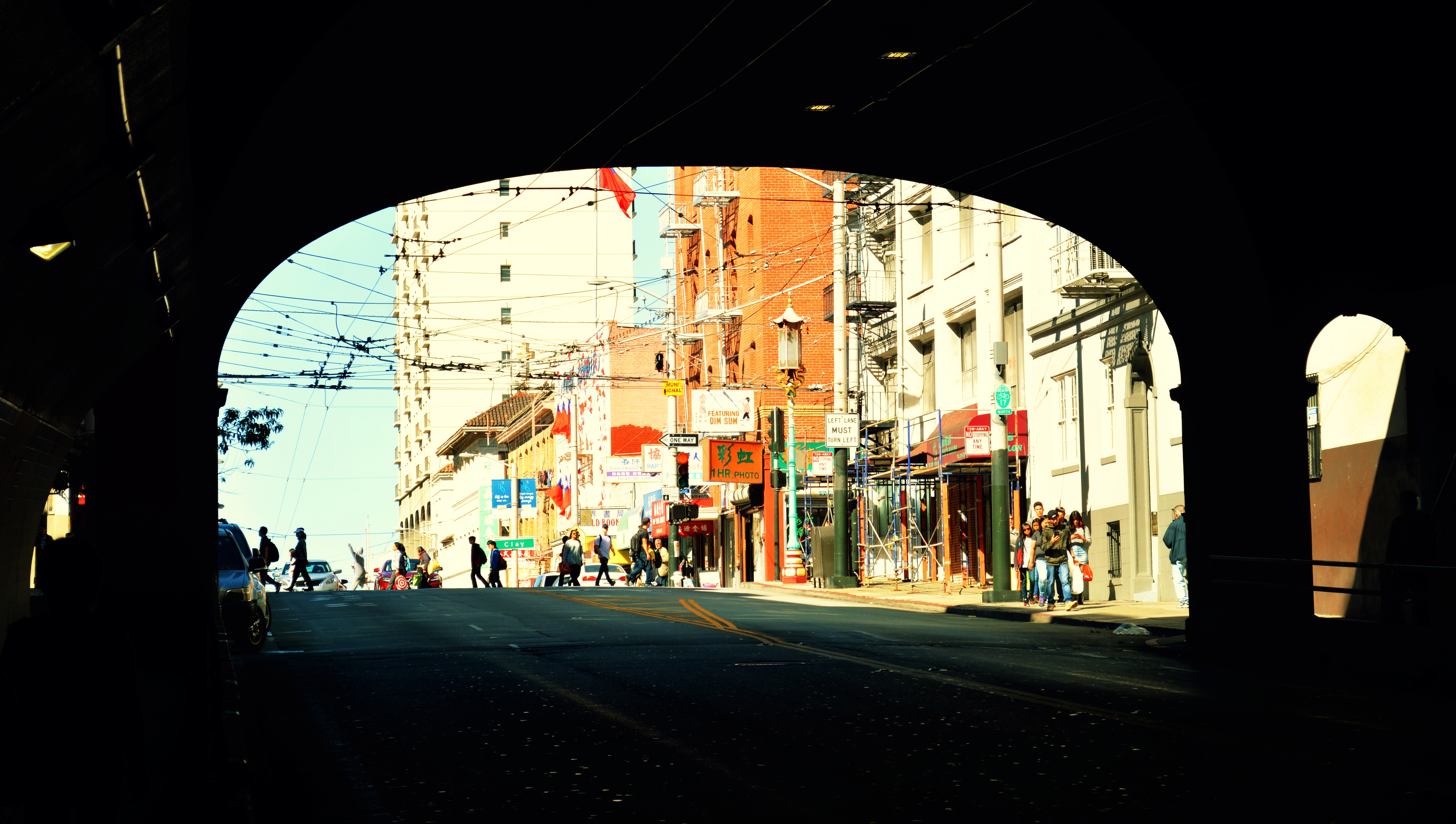
North portal of the Stockton Street Tunnel, looking at Chinatown (2016)

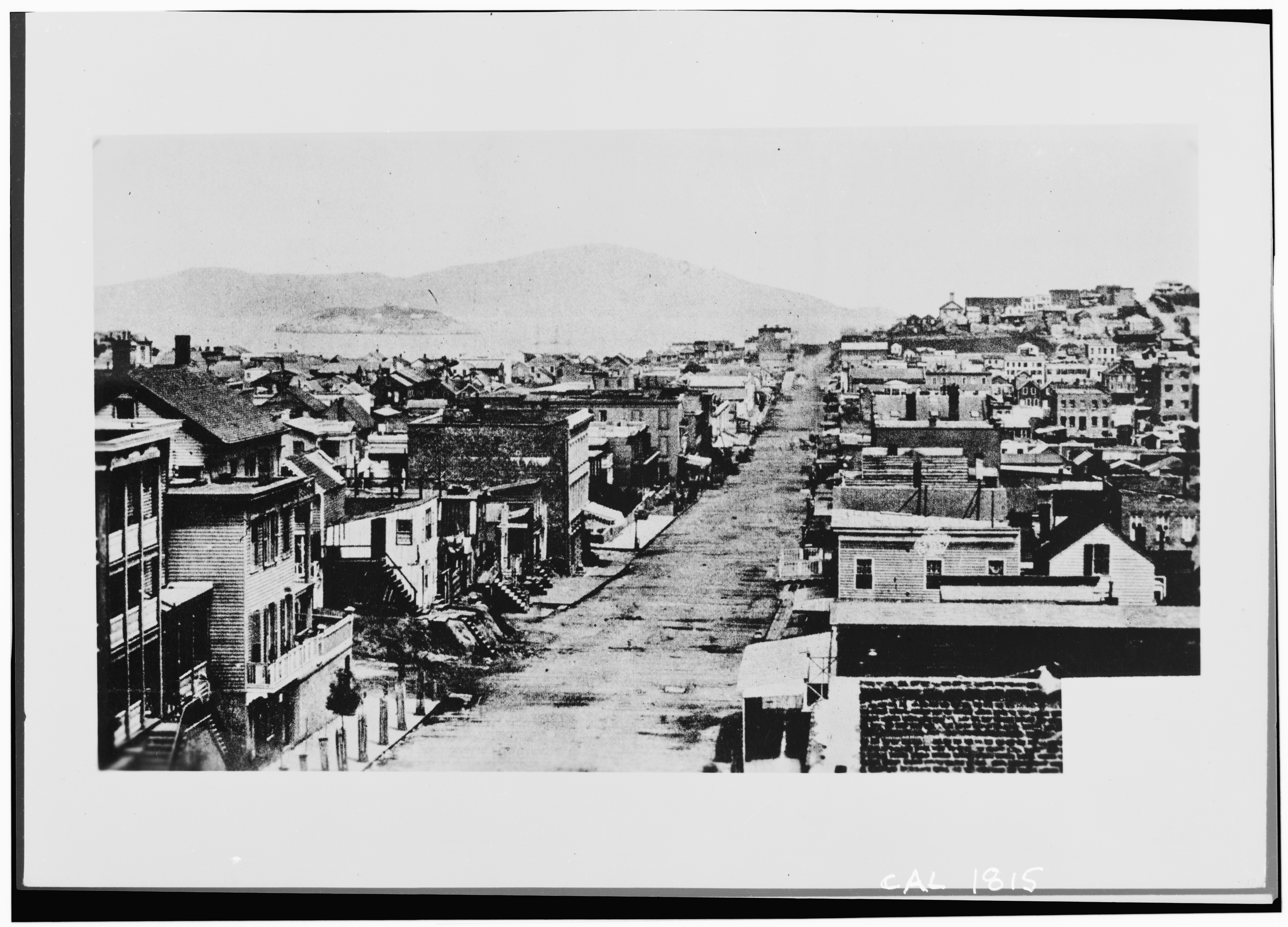
Stockton Street, circa 1870

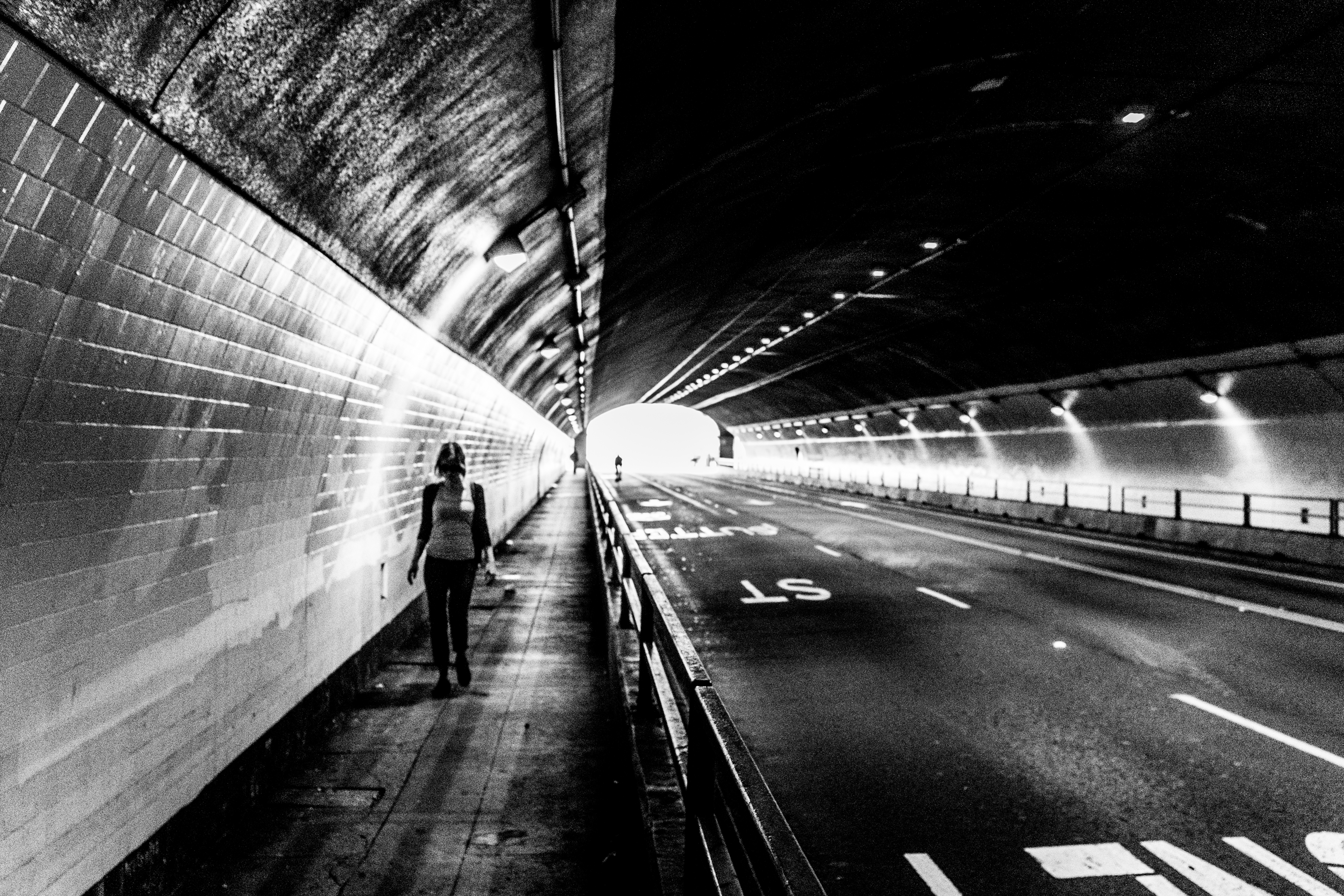
Pedestrian in Stockton Street Tunnel (2014)

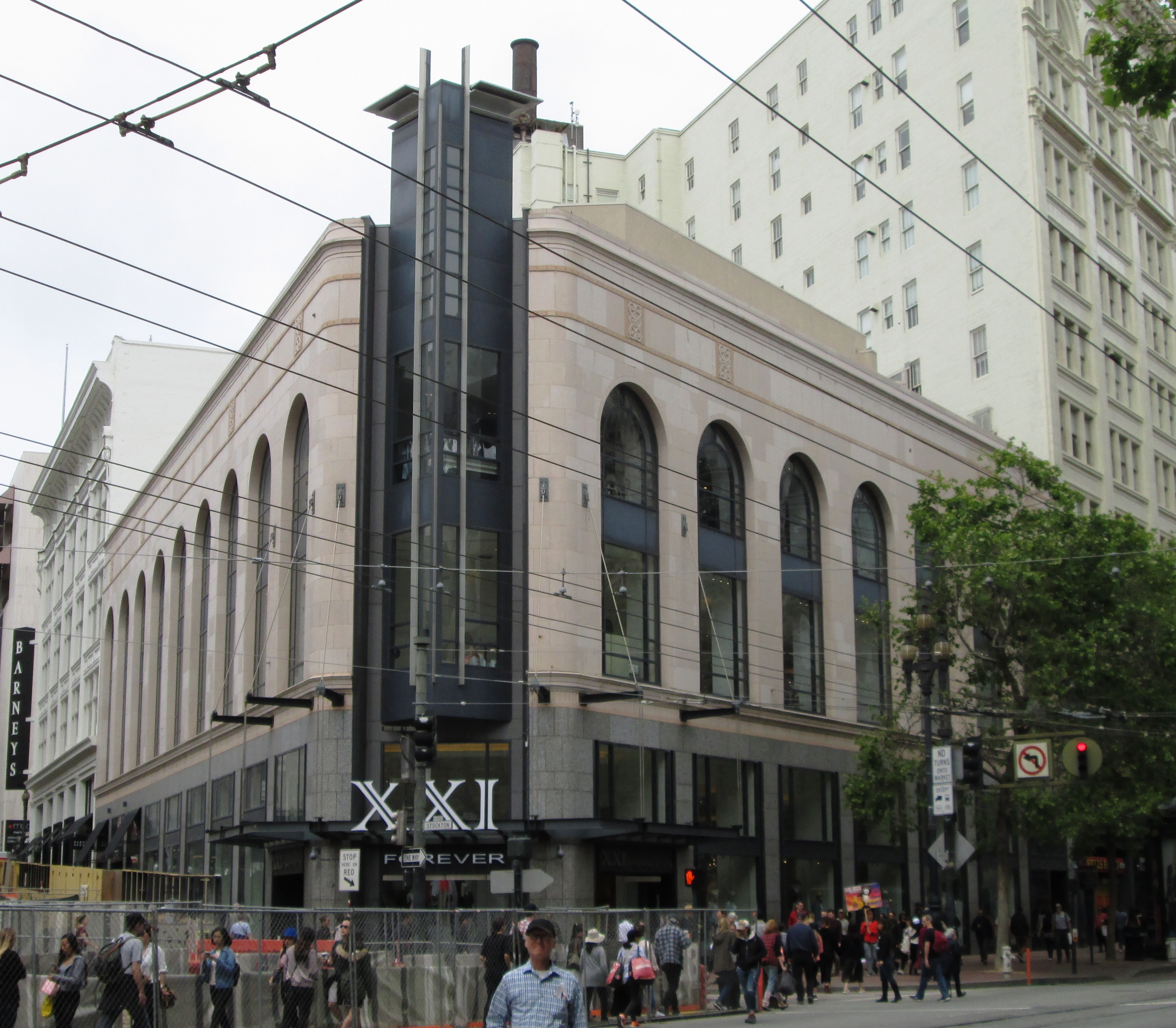
Southern terminus of Stockton at Market (2017)

== See also ==
- Girls High School (San Francisco), at Stockton and Bush streets, 1868
