= 30 Stockton =

Trolleybus route in San Francisco, California

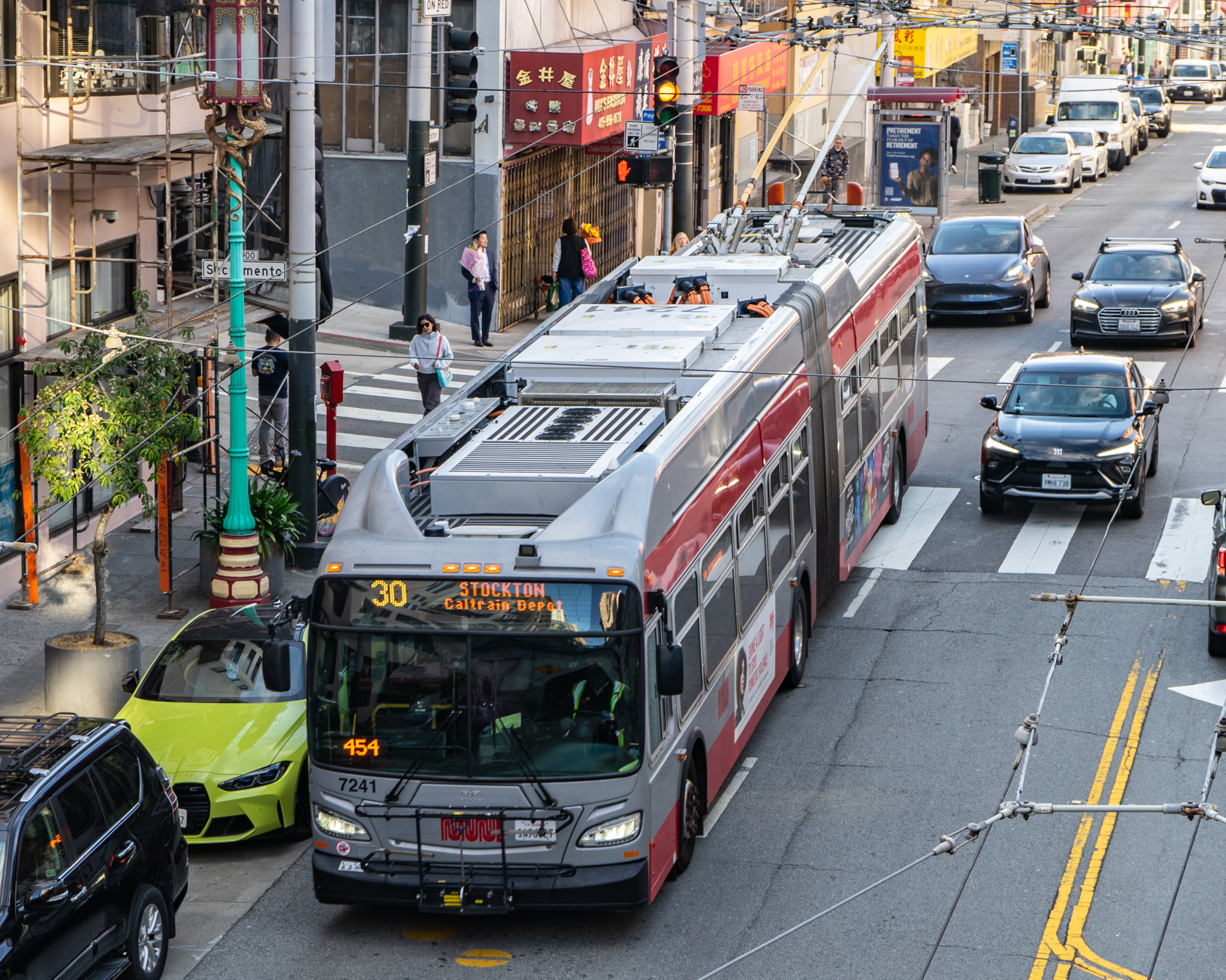
- A New Flyer XT60 trolleybus at Stockton and Sacramento Streets in June 2024

Overview
- System: Muni trolleybus network
- Operator: San Francisco Municipal Railway
- Garage: Potrero Division (30); Flynn Division (30X)
- Vehicle: New Flyer XT60 (30); New Flyer XDE60 (30X)
- Began service: January 20, 1951
- Predecessors: F Stockton

Route
- Locale: San Francisco, California
- Termini: Townsend and 4th (Inbound); Crissy Field in The Presidio (daytime); Divisadero and Chestnut (evening); Van Ness and North Point (some trips as 30S)
- Length: 5.3 miles (8.5 km)
- Other routes: 30X, 45 Union/Stockton

Service
- Frequency: 12m
- Weekend frequency: 15–17m
- Daily ridership: 20,400 (2019)
- Map: 30 Stockton Map

30 Stockton is a trolleybus line operated by the San Francisco Municipal Railway. The line is one of the slowest bus routes in the city of San Francisco because it travels through the densely populated neighborhoods of Union Square, Chinatown, North Beach, and near Fisherman's Wharf.

== Route description ==
Daytime buses operate between Townsend and 4th and Crissy Field. Evening trips terminate outbound at Divisadero and Chestnut. A short turn service operates a slightly modified route between Van Ness Avenue at North Point in the north and Townsend at 5th in the south. It operates primarily on its namesake Stockton Street as well as Columbus Avenue, Chestnut Street, Third Street, Fourth Street, and Fifth Street with short segments on Van Ness Avenue, Divisadero Street, and Broderick. Trips beyond Divisadero and Chestnut operate in battery mode due to lack of overhead wire on the outbound side of the line.

=== 30X Marina Express ===
Express rush-hour service operates between the Marina District and the Financial District, without stopping through most of Russian Hill. From Chestnut Street, inbound (morning) buses run on Van Ness, North Point, and Columbus, Montgomery and Clay, not starting local service until Clay and Montgomery. It continues inbound on Sansome, California, Davis, Beale, and Howard to the Embarcadero. Outbound (evening) buses originate further west at Spear and Howard and run on Howard, Main, Market, Pine, and Sansome where it continues express on Broadway, and Van Ness before beginning to stop on Chestnut.

== History ==
=== F Stockton streetcar ===
The F Stockton was a streetcar route that ran from Market and Stockton to the Marina District via Stockton, Columbus, North Point, Van Ness, and Chestnut to Laguna. This was one of four routes planned as a result of the 1915 Panama–Pacific International Exposition. The Stockton Street Tunnel, opened in 1914, was built primarily for these streetcars. In 1916, the line was extended from Chestnut and Laguna to Chestnut and Scott. It was further extended in 1947 from Market and Stockton down 4th Street to the Southern Pacific terminal on Townsend.

=== Trolleybus operation ===
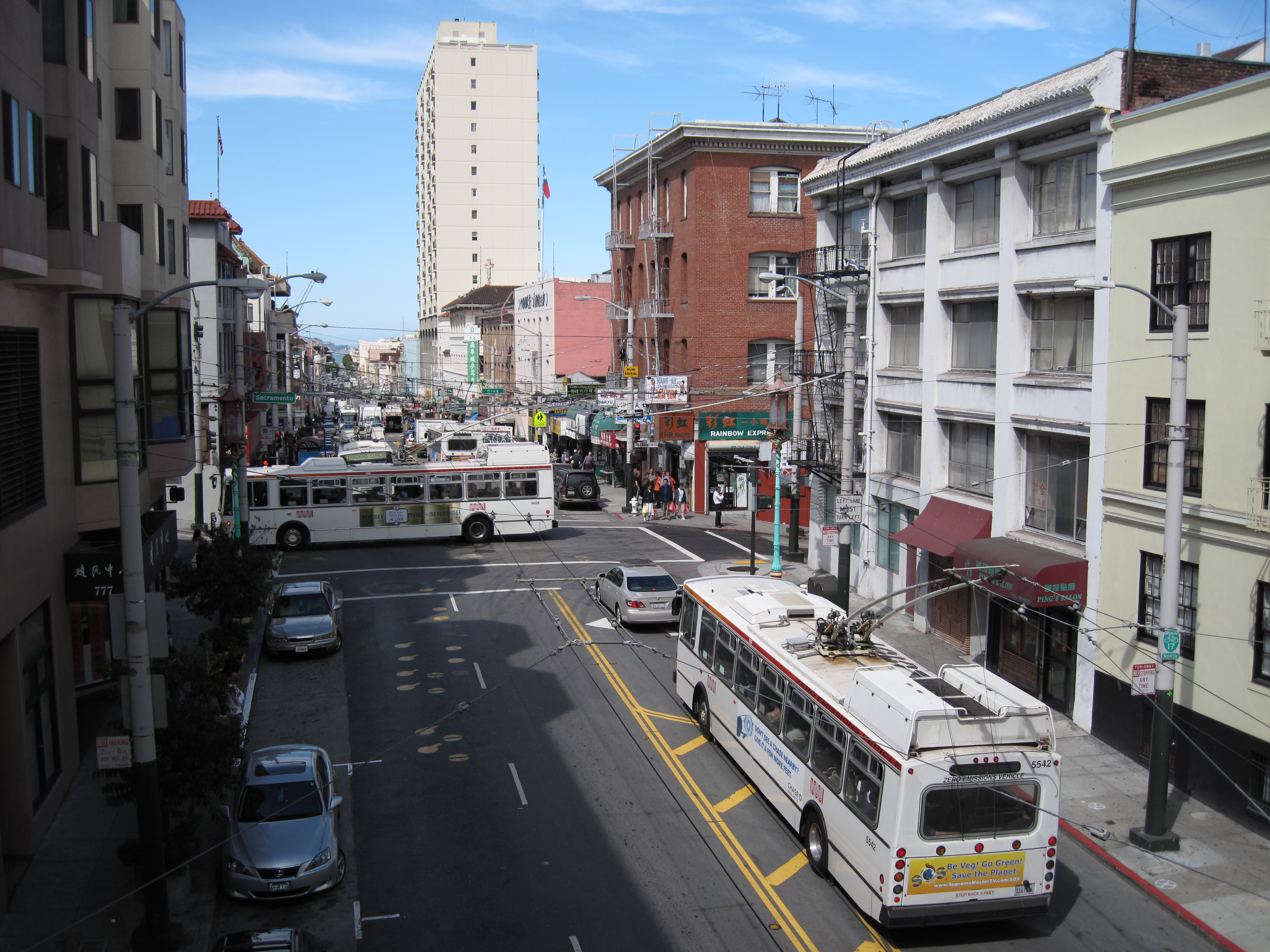
A 30 bus (lower right) headed north after emerging from the Stockton Street Tunnel in 2009. A 1 California trolleybus passes by on Sacramento Street.

Streetcar route F was replaced by trolleybus service on January 20, 1951, and was re-designated as route 30. (The F designation was later reused for the unrelated F Market & Wharves historic streetcar route in 1995.) Wires on Harrison and 5th Streets were installed in 2002 to provide a diversion for construction in the area. Between 2012 and 2019 the line was detoured around 4th Street to allow for construction of the Central Subway.

The route was extended at its outer, northern end by almost one mile (1.6 km) to Crissy Field on September 19, 2020. The overhead trolley wires were not extended, and the trolleybuses operate over the new section solely using battery power, a feature that is sufficiently powerful in the fleet's newest vehicles that they can do so on a regular basis (over short distances). A new dedicated outer terminal opened on September 6, 2024.

30X service was suspended in 2020 amid the COVID-19 pandemic. Limited service, with two southbound trips only in the morning peak, was restored on February 3, 2025. The SFMTA planned to cut the southern end of the 30S short turn route back to Sutter Street near Union Square on February 1, 2025. The change was delayed to accommodate high ridership from Lunar New Year celebrations, NBA All-Star Weekend events, and a temporary closure of the Central Subway. On March 15, 2025, the 30S was instead truncated to Mission Street with reduced frequency.
