= 45 Union/Stockton =

San Francisco Municipal Railway line

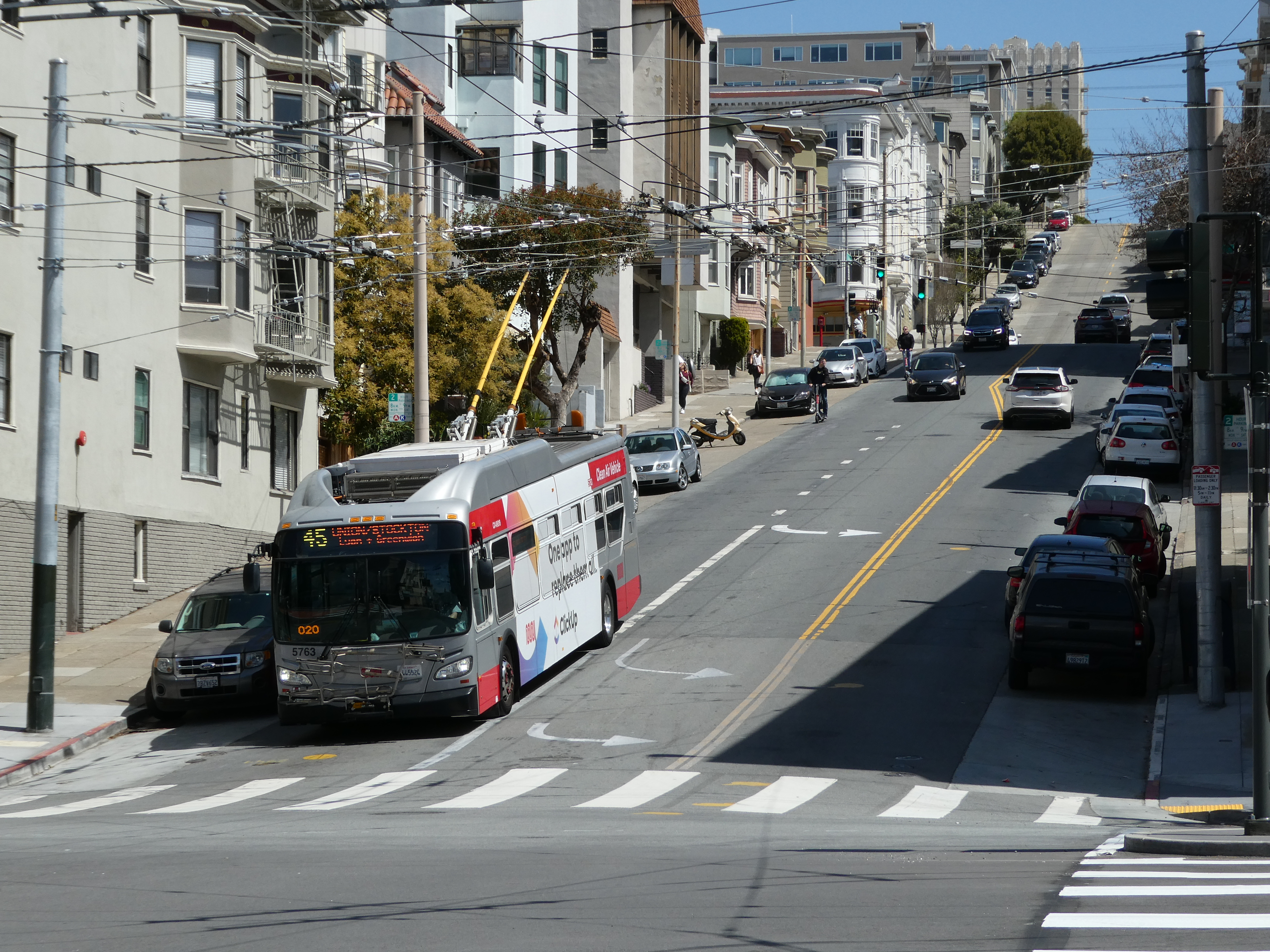
- A westbound Muni route 45 trolleybus at Van Ness Avenue in April 2022

Overview
- System: Muni trolleybus network
- Operator: San Francisco Municipal Railway
- Vehicle: New Flyer XT40
- Began service: 1988
- Predecessors: 45 Union–Van Ness

Route
- Locale: San Francisco, California
- Start: Townsend Street & Lusk Street
- Via: Union St, Stockton St
- End: Lyon Street & Greenwich Street
- Length: 4.2 miles (6.8 km)
- Other routes: 30 Stockton; 41 Union
- Daily ridership: 10,000 (2019)
- Map: 45 Union/Stockton Map

45 Union/Stockton is a trolleybus line operated by the San Francisco Municipal Railway. It connects Cow Hollow to South of Market via Russian Hill, Chinatown, and the Financial District.

== Route ==
The line mostly runs on Union Street and Stockton Street, utilizing the Stockton Street Tunnel. The one-way street system of San Francisco forces buses south of Stockton and Sutter on different routes. Inbound trips continue on Stockton, crossing Market Street and continuing on 4th Street to Harrison. Running a block southwest, buses continue on 5th Street to Townsend, passing the Caltrain Depot before terminating at Lusk Street. Outbound trips originate at that point and turn northwest on 3rd Street. Crossing Market and continuing a short distance on Kearny Street before turning east to meet up with the inbound route.

== History ==
In 1918, the D Geary–Van Ness outbound segment was changed to operate on Union Street instead of Chestnut. Streetcar service ended on March 18, 1950, whereupon the line was served by buses and renamed the 45 Greenwich.

In 1981, Muni was facing a severe shortage of available diesel motor coaches due to age and deferred maintenance, which would lead to the conversion of the 45 Greenwich diesel bus service to the 45 Union–Van Ness trolleybus in 1982 as a temporary experiment later made permanent. By 1988, the line's route had been changed to operate primarily on Union and Stockton, giving the current name.
