= Sunnydale station =

Light rail station in San Francisco, California

Sunnydale
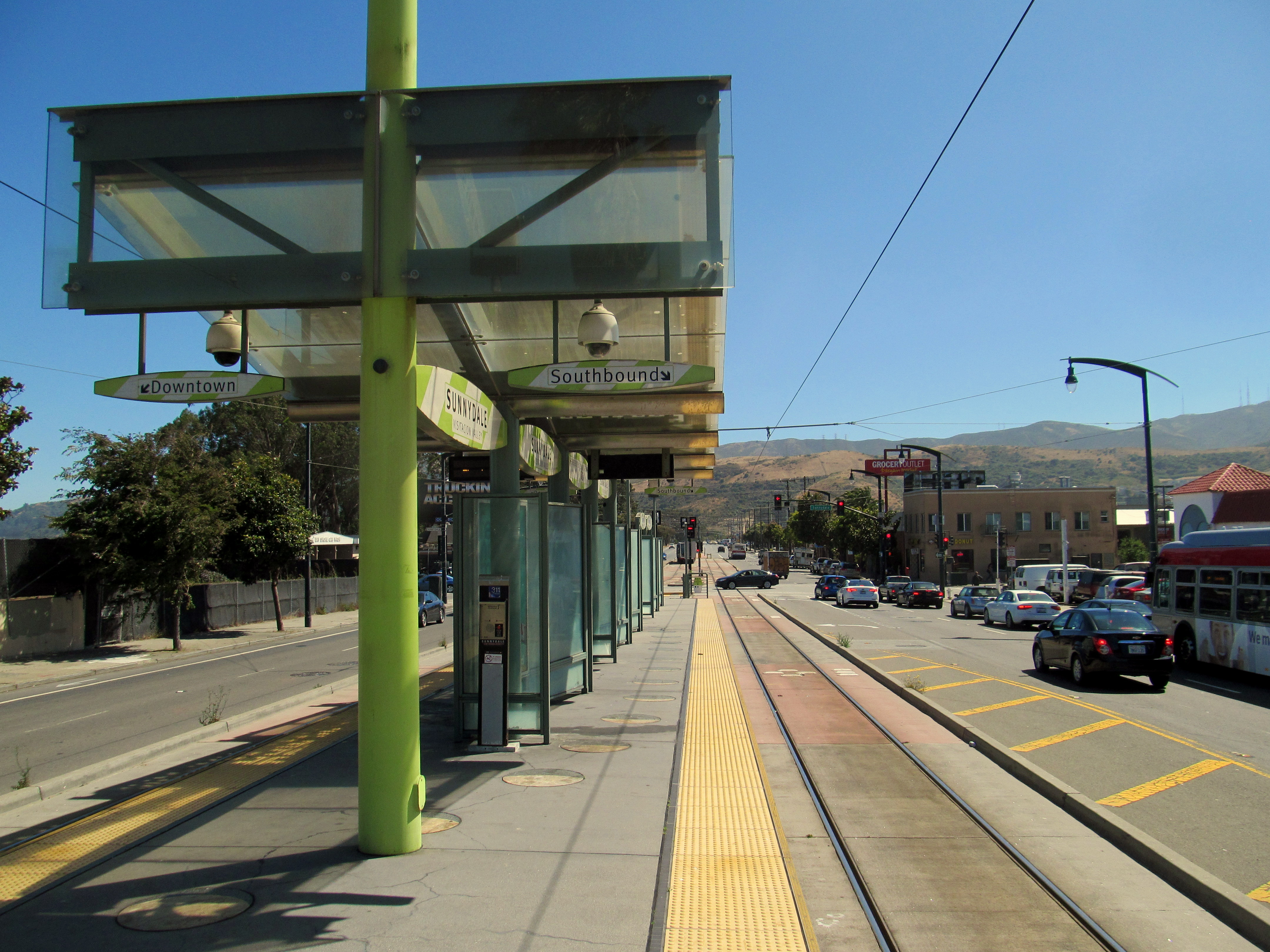
- Sunnydale station in July 2017

General information
- Other names: Visitacion Valley
- Location: Bayshore Boulevard at Sunnydale Avenue; San Francisco, California
- Coordinates: 37°42′32″N 122°24′19″W
- Platforms: 1 island platform
- Tracks: 2
- Connections: Muni: 8AX, 9, 9R; SamTrans: 292

Construction
- Accessible: Yes

History
- Opened: January 13, 2007

Services
Preceding station	Muni	Following station
Arleta toward Chinatown	T Third Street	Terminus
Location

Sunnydale station (also signed as Visitacion Valley) is a light rail station on the Muni Metro T Third Street line, located in the median of Bayshore Boulevard in the Visitacion Valley neighborhood of San Francisco, California, United States. The station opened as the terminus of the T Third Street line on April 7, 2007. It has a single island platform north of Sunnydale Avenue. Tail tracks and a crossover for trains to reverse direction are located south of Sunnydale Avenue.

The station is also served by Muni bus routes 8AX (a weekday peak hours express service), 9 and 9R (a limited-stop rapid service), plus the T Bus and 91 Owl bus routes, which provide service along the T Third Street line during the early morning and late night hours respectively when trains do not operate. Additionally, SamTrans route 292 and 397 (an All Nighter service) stop at the station.
