= List of Guggenheim Fellowships awarded in 2000 =

List of Guggenheim Fellowships awarded in 2000.

== U.S. and Canadian Fellows ==
- Robert H. Abzug, Professor of History and American Studies, University of Texas at Austin: Rollo May and the transformation of American culture.
- Richard D. Alba, Professor of Sociology and Public Policy, State University of New York at Albany: Second generations in immigrant societies.
- April Alliston, Associate Professor of Comparative Literature, Princeton University: Character, plausibility, and gender in French and English historical narratives, 1650-1850.
- Hilton Als, Writer, New York City; Staff Writer, The New Yorker: Creative writing.
- Douglas Anderson, Professor of English, University of Georgia: William Bradford and the Anglo-European republic of letters.
- James Arthur, University Professor, University of Toronto: Representations of classical groups.
- David Auburn, Playwright, Brooklyn, New York: Play writing.
- David Baker, Poet, Granville, Ohio; Professor of English and Thomas B. Fordham Professor of Creative Writing, Denison University; Poetry Editor, The Kenyon Review: Poetry.
- Joan Banach, Artist, New York City: Painting.
- Abhijit V. Banerjee, Professor of Economics, Massachusetts Institute of Technology: The new economics of poverty.
- Jill Banfield, Professor of Geology and Geophysics, University of Wisconsin–Madison: Microbe-mineral interactions of environmental importance.
- Ernesto Bazan, Photographer, Brooklyn, New York: Photography.
- Howard Curtis Berg, Professor of Molecular and Cellular Biology and of Physics, Harvard University: The motile behavior of bacteria.
- Jane A. Bernstein, Austin Fletcher Professor of Music, Tufts University: Music and print culture in Renaissance Rome.
- William Betz, Professor of Physiology and Biophysics, University of Colorado Health Sciences Center, Denver: The optical detection of synaptic function.
- Rabi Bhattacharya, Professor of Mathematics, Indiana University Bloomington: Studies in Markov processes.
- Tom Bills, Artist, Brooklyn, New York; Associate Professor of Art, Brandeis University: Sculpture.
- Lisa M. Bitel, Associate Professor of History and Women's Studies and Director of Women's Studies, University of Kansas: Landscape, gender, and Christianization in Gaul and Ireland.
- Stuart Blackburn, Senior Lecturer in Tamil and South Indian Studies and Chairman, Centre of South Asian Studies, University of London: The role of folklore in colonial south India.
- Isidro Blasco, Artist, New York City: Sculpture and installation art.
- Anne Bogart, Associate Professor of Theatre Arts, Columbia University; Artistic Director, Saratoga International Theater Institute (SITI), New York City: Essays on the theatre.
- Lloyd Bonfield, Professor of Law, Tulane University: Litigants, lawyers, and the law in English probate courts, 1660-1700.
- Nina Bovasso, Artist, New York City: Painting and drawing.
- John M. Bowers, Professor of English, University of Nevada, Las Vegas: The antagonistic tradition of Chaucer and Langland.
- Michael E. Bratman, Howard H. and Jessie T. Watkins University Professor of Philosophy, Stanford University: Self-determination and planning agency.
- Martin Brody, Composer, Cambridge, Massachusetts; Catherine Mills Davis Professor of Music, Wellesley College: Music composition.
- Ronald K. Brown, Choreographer, Brooklyn, New York; Artistic Director, Evidence, New York City: Choreography.
- William Craft Brumfield, Professor of Slavic Studies, Tulane University: The architecture of the Russian North.
- Michael Camille, Mary J. Block Professor of Art History, University of Chicago: Sculpture, signs, and street life in medieval France.
- Vicki Caron, Thomas and Diann Mann Professor of Modern Jewish Studies, Cornell University: Catholic-Jewish relations in France since 1871.
- Shih-Hui Chen, Composer, Malden, Massachusetts: Music composition.
- Patricia Cheng, Professor of Psychology, University of California, Los Angeles: A psychological theory of causal discovery.
- Alice L. Conklin, Associate Professor of History, University of Rochester: Ethnographic liberalism in France, 1920-1945.
- Diana Cooper, Artist, Brooklyn, New York; Adjunct Professor of Art, New York University: Painting and installation art.
- Kevin R. Cox, Professor of Geography, Ohio State University: The Americal politics of local economic development.
- Christopher J. Cramer, Associate Professor of Chemistry, Chemical Physics, and Scientific Computation, University of Minnesota: The structure and reactivity of chemical and biological systems.
- Hai-Lung Dai, Professor of Chemistry, University of Pennsylvania: Chemical-reaction control.
- Kathryn Davis, Writer, East Calais, Vermont; Professor of English, Skidmore College: Fiction.
- Veronica Day, Photographer, Brooklyn, New York: Photography.
- Peter Dear, Professor of History and of Science and Technology Studies, Cornell University: Making sense in science.
- Donald J. DePaolo, Class of 1951 Professor of Geochemistry, University of California, Berkeley: The geochemical effects of magma generation and transport.
- Robert Desjarlais, Assistant Professor of Anthropology, Sarah Lawrence College: Sensory biographies among Nepal's Yolmo Buddhists.
- Jessica Diamond, Artist, Brooklyn, New York: Painting.
- Arthur Dong, Film Maker, Los Angeles; Producer and Director, DeepFocus Productions: Film making.
- Tom Drury, Writer, Litchfield, Connecticut: Fiction.
- Thomas Dublin, Professor of History, Binghamton University: Economic decline in the Pennsylvania anthracite region, 1920-1990.
- Robert S. DuPlessis, Isaac H. Clothier Professor of History and International Relations, Swarthmore College: A history of consumption in the early modern Atlantic world.
- Lauren B. Edelman, Professor of Law and Sociology, University of California, Berkeley: The formation of civil-rights law in the workplace.
- Anthony Feinstein, Associate Professor of Psychiatry, University of Toronto: Trauma-related mental health issues in post-apartheid Namibia.
- Alexei V. Filippenko, Professor of Astronomy, University of California, Berkeley: The expansion of the universe.
- Marc R. Forster, Associate Professor of History, Connecticut College: The emergence of German Catholic identity.
- Howard Gardner, John H. and Elisabeth A. Hobbs Professor of Cognition and Education, Harvard University: The origins and development of good work.
- Jonathon Glassman, Associate Professor of History, Northwestern University: Racial thought in colonial Zanzibar.
- Jill Godmilow, Video Artist, South Bend, Indiana; Professor of Film, Television and Theatre, University of Notre Dame: Video.
- Susan Goldin-Meadow, Professor of Psychology, University of Chicago: Gesture and the mind.
- Rigoberto González, Poet, New York City; Literacy Teacher, Coalition for Hispanic Family Services, Brooklyn: Poetry.
- Francisco Gonzalez-Crussi, Professor of Pathology, Northwestern University Medical School; Head of Laboratories, Children's Memorial Hospital, Chicago: Essays on human generation.
- Paul D. Grannis, Distinguished Professor of Physics, State University of New York at Stony Brook: Studies of broken symmetry in nature.
- Milford Graves, Composer, Jamaica, New York; Member of the Core Faculty in Music, Bennington College: Music composition.
- Richard L. Greaves, Robert O. Lawton Distinguished Professor of History, Florida State University: John Bunyan in historical perspective.
- Vanalyne Green, Video Artist, Chicago; Associate Professor of Video Art, School of the Art Institute of Chicago: Video.
- Linda Gregerson, Poet, Ann Arbor, Michigan; Associate Professor of English, University of Michigan: Poetry.
- Craig R. Groves, Director, Conservation Planning, The Nature Conservancy, Boise, Idaho: The conservation of biological diversity.
- Robert J. Hamers, Evan P. Helfaer Professor of Chemistry, University of Wisconsin–Madison: Studies in molecular electronics.
- Brooks Haxton, Poet, Syracuse, New York; Director of Creative Writing, Syracuse University: Poetry.
- Wick Haxton, Professor of Physics and Director, Institute for Nuclear Theory, University of Washington, Seattle: Studies in neutrino-induced nucleosynthesis.
- Thomas Head, Professor of History, Hunter College and the Graduate Center, City University of New York: Saints, relics, and patronage in Western Christendom, 200-1215.
- Gerry Hemingway, Composer and Percussionist, Plainsboro, New Jersey: Music composition.
- Amy Hempel, Writer, Bridgehampton, New York; Member of the Core Faculty in Writing, Bennington College: Fiction.
- Alicia Henry, Artist, Nashville, Tennessee; Assistant Professor of Art, Fisk University: Painting and drawing.
- Nancy A. Hewitt, Professor of History, Rutgers University: American women's activism, 1840-1965.
- Tony Hoagland, Poet, Las Cruces, New Mexico; Assistant Professor of English, New Mexico State University: Poetry.
- Jennifer L. Hochschild, William Stewart Tod Professor of Public and International Affairs, Princeton University: The prospects for democratic pluralism in the United States.
- Lillian Hoddeson, Associate Professor of History and Senior Research Physicist, University of Illinois at Urbana-Champaign; Historian, Fermi National Accelerator Laboratory, Batavia, Illinois: The life and science of John Bardeen.
- Manuela Hoelterhoff, Writer, New York City: Germaine Lubin and Bayreuth in 1939.
- Michael B. Holden, Artist, Santa Rosa, California: Painting.
- Peter Jeffery, Professor of Music, Princeton University: The earliest manuscript of the Roman chant tradition.
- Sajeev John, Professor of Physics, University of Toronto: Photonic-band gap materials.
- Claudia L. Johnson, Professor of English, Princeton University: Jane Austen's status as a legend.
- Amelia Jones, Professor of Art History, University of California, Riverside: New York Dada, 1915-1922.
- Lawrence Joseph, Professor of Law, St. John's University: Essays on Catholicism.
- Deborah Anne Kapchan, Associate Professor of Anthropology and Director, Center for Intercultural Studies in Folklore and Ethnomusicology, University of Texas at Austin: Self and nation in Moroccan oral poetry.
- Larry Karush, Composer, Los Angeles: Music composition.
- Dovid Katz, Writer, County Conway, Wales; Professor of Yiddish Language, Literature and Culture, and Director, Center for Stateless Cultures, Vilnius University, Lithuania: Fiction in Yiddish.
- Steve Keister, Artist, New York City; Instructor in Art, School of Visual Arts; Instructor in Art, Maryland Institute College of Art; Instructor in Art, Hofstra University: Sculpture.
- Evelyn Fox Keller, Professor of History and Philosophy of Science, Massachusetts Institute of Technology: Explanation in developmental biology.
- Joel Kingsolver, Professor of Zoology, University of Washington, Seattle: The topography of adaptive landscapes.
- George Knox, Professor Emeritus of Art History, University of British Columbia: Tiepolo's New Testament drawings.
- Dorothy Ko, Associate Professor of History and Women's Studies, Rutgers University: The history and culture of footbinding.
- Ewa Lajer-Burcharth, Harris K. Weston Associate Professor of the Humanities, Harvard University: The idea of the self in 18th-century art.
- Chang-rae Lee, Writer, Ridgewood, New Jersey; Professor of English, Hunter College, City University of New York: Fiction.
- Laura L. Letinsky, Photographer, Chicago; Assistant Professor of Photography, University of Chicago: Photography.
- Jill Levine, Artist, New York City; Instructor in Studio Art, Sarah J. Hale High School, Brooklyn: Painting and sculpture.
- Bernth Lindfors, Professor of English and African Literatures, University of Texas at Austin: Ira Aldridge's theatrical career in Europe.
- John T. Lis, Professor of Molecular Biology and Genetics, Cornell University: Protein templating in the propagation of gene activity.
- Jennie Livingston, Film Maker, Brooklyn, New York; Writer, Director, and Producer, Off White (OW!) Productions, Brooklyn: Film making.
- Susanne Lohmann, Professor of Political Science and of Policy Studies and Director, Center for Comparative Political Economy, University of California, Los Angeles: Administrative rationality in the research university.
- Lev Loseff, Professor of Russian, Dartmouth College: An annotated bilingual edition of Joseph Brodsky's poetry.
- Scott P. Mainwaring, Eugene Conley Professor of Government and Director, Kellogg Institute for International Studies, University of Notre Dame: The durability of Latin America's post-1978 elected governments.
- Thomas Mallon, Writer, Westport, Connecticut: Fiction.
- Sara Shelton Mann, Choreographer, San Francisco: Choreography.
- Jaime Manrique, Writer, New York City; Member of the Part-time Faculty, Eugene Lang College, New School University: A memoir.
- Emer Martin, Writer, Kilcloone, County Meath, Ireland; Contributing Editor, BlackBook magazine, New York City: Fiction.
- James Matheson, Composer, Tampa, Florida; Lecturer in Music, Ithaca College, New York: Music composition.
- Katharine Eisaman Maus, Professor of English, University of Virginia: A history of English literature, 1603-1660.
- Colleen McDannell, Professor of History and Sterling M. McMurrin Professor of Religious Studies, University of Utah: Religious America in government photography, 1935-1943.
- Andrew Rimvydas Miksys, Photographer, Baton Rouge, Louisiana and Seattle, Washington; Instructor in Photography, Louisiana State University: Photography.
- Donka Minkova, Professor of English, University of California, Los Angeles: Verse form and linguistic reconstruction in English.
- Rick Moody, Writer, Fishers Island, New York; Member of the Core Faculty in Writing, Bennington College: A family memoir.
- Philip D. Morgan, Professor of History and Editor, William & Mary Quarterly, Omohundro Institute of Early American History and Culture, College of William & Mary: White and black in 18th-century Jamaica.
- Bill Morrison, Film Maker, New York City: Film making.
- Stephen Mueller, Artist, New York City: Painting.
- Madhusree Mukerjee, Writer, Jackson Heights, New York; Editor, Scientific American, New York City: The Andaman Islanders.
- Lawrence Nees, Professor of Art History, University of Delaware: Frankish illuminated manuscripts.
- Antonya Nelson, Writer, Las Cruces, New Mexico; Associate Professor of English, New Mexico State University: Fiction.
- Barbara Newman, Professor of English and Religion, Northwestern University: Vision, poetry, and belief in the Middle Ages.
- Andrea Wilson Nightingale, Associate Professor of Classics and Comparative Literature, Stanford University: The conception of wisdom in 4th-century Athens.
- Stephen Orgel, Jackson Eli Reynolds Professor in the Humanities, Stanford University: The history of the relation between Shakespearean texts and productions.
- H. Allen Orr, Associate Professor of Biology, University of Rochester: The genetic origin of species.
- Robert A. Orsi, Professor of Religious Studies, Indiana University Bloomington: American Catholics' recollections of their childhoods in the Church.
- Ed Osborn, Artist, Oakland, California: Sound installation.
- Eric Pankey, Poet, Fairfax, Virginia; Professor of English, George Mason University: Poetry.
- Joseph Parisi, Editor, Poetry, Chicago; Executive Director, Modern Poetry Association: A documentary history of Poetry magazine.
- Suzan-Lori Parks, Playwright, Brooklyn, New York: Play writing.
- Ed Paschke, Artist, Chicago; Professor of Art, Northwestern University: Painting.
- Mary Sponberg Pedley, Teacher, Ann Arbor Public Schools; Adjunct Assistant Curator of Maps, William L. Clements Library, University of Michigan: Printed maps and popular taste in 18th-century France and England.
- Louis A. Pérez, Jr., J. Carlyle Sitterson Professor of History, University of North Carolina at Chapel Hill: Suicide and exemplary death in Cuba.
- Donna J. Peuquet, Professor of Geography, Pennsylvania State University: A cognitive approach to representing geographic knowledge.
- Mark Phillips, Professor of History, University of British Columbia: A short history of distance.
- Suzan Pitt, Film Animator, Los Angeles; Member of the Faculty in Experimental Animation, California Institute of the Arts: Film animation.
- Vicente L. Rafael, Associate Professor of Communication, University of California, San Diego: Language and the origins of nationalism in the Philippines.
- Jahan Ramazani, Professor of English, University of Virginia: Postcolonial poetry in English.
- Thomas W. Reps, Professor of Computer Science, University of Wisconsin–Madison: A new compressed representation of Boolean functions.
- David Riker, Film Maker, New York City: Film making.
- John Storm Roberts, Independent Scholar, Tivoli, New York: Latin dance in the United States.
- Roxana Robinson, Writer, New York City: Fiction.
- Larry Rohrschneider, Member, Division of Basic Sciences, Fred Hutchinson Cancer Research Center and Affiliate Professor of Pathology, University of Washington, Seattle: Molecular mechanisms for regulating the growth of blood cells.
- Daniel S. Rokhsar, Professor of Physics and Head, Computational and Theoretical Biology, Lawrence Berkeley National Laboratory, University of California, Berkeley: Studies in computational and theoretical biology.
- James Rolfe, Composer, Toronto: Music composition.
- Dennis Romano, Professor of History, Syracuse University: Doge Francesco Foscari and the crisis of Venetian republicanism.
- Marian Roth, Photographer, Provincetown, Massachusetts: Photography.
- Ingrid D. Rowland, Associate Professor of Art History, University of Chicago: A life of Giordano Bruno.
- Roswell Rudd, Composer and Jazz Trombonist, Kerhonkson, New York: Music composition.
- John Russell, Writer, New York City; Art Critic, The New York Times: A memoir.
- Richard Ryan, Artist, Millers Falls, Massachusetts; Adjunct Senior Critic in Art, Brandeis University: Painting.
- Jackie Saccoccio, Artist, New York City: Painting.
- Mark Salzman, Writer, Glendale, California: Nonfiction.
- Tamar Schlick, Professor of Mathematics, Chemistry, and Computer Science, Courant Institute of Mathematical Sciences and Associate Investigator, Howard Hughes Medical Institute, New York University: Modeling studies of protein-DNA complexes.
- Glen Seator, Artist, Brooklyn, New York: Sculpture and installation art.
- James J. Sheehan, Dickason Professor in the Humanities and Professor of History, Stanford University: A history of sovereignty in 20th-century Europe.
- S. Murray Sherman, Leading Professor of Neurobiology and Behavior, State University of New York at Stony Brook: The thalamic relay of visual signals to the cortex.
- Jocelyn Penny Small, Professor of Art History and the Library, Rutgers University: Narrative in classical art.
- Bruce Smith, Poet, Tuscaloosa, Alabama; Associate Professor of English, University of Alabama: Poetry.
- Rebecca Solnit, Writer, San Francisco: Photography and the invention of the present.
- John Stembridge, Professor of Mathematics, University of Michigan: Combinatorial aspects of root systems and Weyl characters.
- Judy Stevens, Artist, New York City: Sculpture.
- Frank H. Stewart, Professor of Islamic and Middle Eastern Studies, Hebrew University of Jerusalem: The customary law of the Sinai Bedouin.
- Robert Blair St. George, Associate Professor of History, University of Pennsylvania: Spoken language and oral poetics in early New England.
- Kristine Stiles, Associate Professor of Art and Art History, Duke University: Documentary photography of the nuclear age.
- Gwen Strahle, Artist, Dayville, Connecticut; Member of the Adjunct Faculty in Art, Rhode Island School of Design: Painting.
- Z. S. Strother, Assistant Professor of Art History and Archaeology, Columbia University: The relationship of art to power in central Africa.
- Richard Talbert, William Rand Kenan, Jr., Professor of History and Adjunct Professor of Classics, University of North Carolina at Chapel Hill: Cartography and world-view in ancient Rome.
- Julie Taylor, Professor of Anthropology, Rice University: Argentine tango and the aesthetic of violence.
- Maria Todorova, Professor of History, University of Florida: Nationalism and hero worship in the Balkans.
- Stephen Tourlentes, Photographer, Somerville, Massachusetts; Visiting Associate Professor of Photography, Massachusetts College of Art: Photography.
- Robert Trivers, Professor of Anthropology and Biological Sciences, Rutgers University: Genetic conflict within the individual.
- Amanda Vaill, Writer, New York City: A biography of Jerome Robbins.
- David J. Vayo, Composer, Bloomington, Illinois; Associate Professor of Composition and Theory and Coordinator, New Music Activities, Illinois Wesleyan University: Music composition.
- Elizabeth Vierling, Professor of Biochemistry and of Molecular and Cellular Biology, and of Plant Sciences, University of Arizona: Gene-mapping for agricultural productivity at high temperatures.
- Darla Villani, Choreographer, Brooklyn, New York: Choreography.
- Mike Wallace, Professor of History, John Jay College of Criminal Justice, City University of New York: A history of New York City since 1898.
- Wen I. Wang, Thayer Lindsley Professor of Electrical Engineering, Columbia University: Semiconductor heterostructures for information technologies.
- Brenda Way, Choreographer, Oakland, California; Artistic Director, ODC/San Francisco: Choreography.
- Joan Weiner, Professor of Philosophy, University of Wisconsin–Milwaukee: Frege's lessons for our understanding of language.
- Rainer Weiss, Professor of Physics, Massachusetts Institute of Technology: Gravitational waves of astrophysical origin.
- Jennifer Widom, Associate Professor of Computer Science and Electrical Engineering, Stanford University: New query and search techniques for the Internet.
- Jennette Williams, Photographer, New York City; Instructor in Photography, School of Visual Arts: Photography.
- Rhodri Windsor-Liscombe, Professor of Fine Arts, University of British Columbia: Modernist architectural theory and practice in the British Empire and Commonwealth.
- Shira Wolosky, Professor of English and American Literature, Hebrew University of Jerusalem: Meaning without metaphysics in Hebraic tradition.
- Stephen Shing-Toung Yau, Professor of Mathematics, Statistics, and Computer Science and Director, Control and Information Laboratory, University of Illinois at Chicago: Studies in complex and combinatorial geometry.
- Marilyn B. Young, Professor of History, New York University: The postwar war in Korea.
- Xumu Zhang, Associate Professor of Chemistry, Pennsylvania State University: Man-made catalysts for manufacturing.

== Latin American and Caribbean Fellows ==
- Andrés Alsina, Writer, Montevideo, Uruguay; Editor and Executive Director, El Diario, Montevideo: Nonfiction (in collaboration with Ana Solari).
- Javier Auyero, Assistant Professor of Sociology, State University of New York at Stony Brook: Forms of collective action against structural adjustment and public corruption in contemporary Argentina.
- Ana Mariella Bacigalupo, Assistant Professor of Anthropology, University at Buffalo: Gender and healing among the Chilean Mapuche.
- Carlos A. Bertulani, Associate Professor of Physics, Institute of Physics, Federal University of Rio de Janeiro: A study of relativistic heavy-ion collisions and neutrino astrophysics.
- Coral Bracho, Poet, Mexico City: Poetry.
- Arnaldo Calveyra, Poet and Translator, Paris, France: Poetry.
- Ernesto Julio Calvo, Professor of Physical Chemistry, University of Buenos Aires: A study of self-assembled proteins at interfaces for molecular recognition and signal generation.
- Ricardo Cantoral, Professor of Mathematics Education, Center for Research and Advanced Studies, National Polytechnic Institute, Mexico City: The social construction of advanced mathematical knowledge and its institutional diffusion.
- Daniel Catán, Composer, Los Angeles; Associate Director of Music, College of the Canyons, Santa Clarita, California: Music composition.
- Elvira Cuevas, Associate Research Professor, Venezuelan Scientific Research Institute, Caracas: Changes in peat accretion in mangrove communities as an indicator of climate change.
- Marco Antonio de la Parra, Playwright, Santiago, Chile: Play writing.
- Aurelio de los Reyes, Research Scholar, Institute of Aesthetics Research, National Autonomous University of Mexico (UNAM): The cinema in Mexico, 1924-1932.
- Julián Echave, Professor of Chemical Physics, National University of Quilmes, Buenos Aires: Structurally constrained protein evolution.
- Daniel Goldberg, Film Maker, Mexico City; Director and Producer, Goldberg Lerner Productions: Film making.
- Diego Golombek, Professor of Physiology, National University of Quilmes; Researcher, National Research Council of Argentina (CONICET): A study of biological timing and rhythms.
- Mario Levrero, Writer, Montevideo, Uruguay: Fiction.
- Leonardo López Luján, Research Professor, National Institute of Anthropology and History (INAH), Mexico City: Elite and government at Teotihuacan, Mexico.
- Eduardo Reck Miranda, Composer, Paris, France; Researcher, Sony Computer Science Laboratory, Paris: Music composition.
- Carlos Newland, Rector, Argentina University of Administration Sciences, Buenos Aires: Economic growth and structural change in the Andean region, 1650-1800.
- Raquel Olea Barriga, Area Coordinator of Education and Culture, La Morada Corporation for the Development of Women, Santiago: Reconfiguration of male and female identity in social and esthetic languages of the Chilean transition.
- Keyla Orozco Alemán, Composer, Amsterdam, the Netherlands: Music compositions.
- Enrique Ramiro Pujals, Assistant Professor of Mathematics, Federal University of Rio de Janeiro: A study of nonhyperbolic dynamical systems.
- Alejandro Cristian Raga, Senior Scientist, Institute of Astronomy, National Autonomous University of Mexico (UNAM): A study of collimated outflows from young stars.
- Alessandra Sanguinetti, Photographer, Buenos Aires: Photography.
- Maryse Sistach Perret, Film Maker, Mexico City: Film making.
- Marta Lucia de Amorim Soares, Choreographer, São Paulo; Professor of Dance, Pontifical Catholic University of Sao Paulo: Choreography.
- Fernando Ezequiel Solanas, Film Maker, Buenos Aires: Film making.
- Ana Solari, Writer, Montevideo, Uruguay; Professor of Expressive and Creative Workshops and Student Counselor, Communications and Design School, University ORT, Montevideo: Nonfiction (in collaboration with Andrés Alsina).
- Osvaldo Tcherkaski, Journalist, Buenos Aires; Assistant Managing Editor, Clarin: A new totalitarian trend of journalism in interpretation and criticism.
- Ricardo Valderrama Fernández, University Professor of Anthropology, National University of San Antonio Abad in Cuzco, Peru: Twentieth-century myths of the Quechuas.
- Pablo Veron, Choreographer, Montreal, Canada, and New York City: Choreography.
- Vida Yovanovich, Photographer, Mexico City: Photography.
- Trisha Ziff, Writer and Curator, Mexico City: The historical narrative of the San Patricios in a contemporary context.

== See also ==
- Guggenheim Fellowship
