= Nancy Davidson (artist) =

American feminist artist

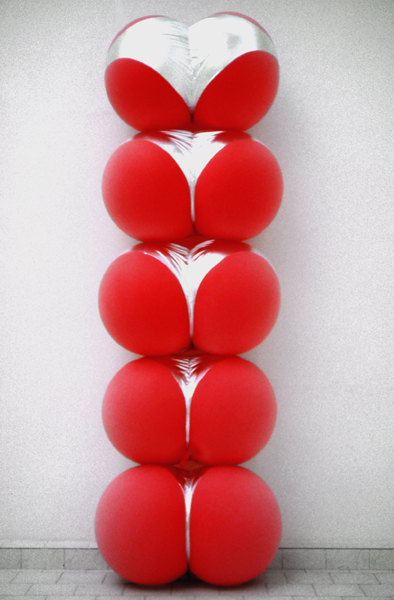
- Buttress, latex, rope and plastic, 180" x 53" x 333", 1997.
- Born: Nancy Brachman; November 3, 1943 (age 82); Chicago, Illinois, United States
- Education: School of the Art Institute of Chicago, University of Illinois at Chicago
- Known for: Sculpture, photography, video
- Movement: Contemporary, Feminist art
- Spouse: Greg Drasler
- Awards: Guggenheim, Pollock-Krasner, Anonymous Was a Woman Award, National Endowment for the Arts, Creative Capital
- Website: Nancy Davidson

Nancy Davidson is an American artist best known for large-scale inflatable sculptures regarded as hyper-feminized abstractions of the human female form. Bulbous and flesh-like, the sculptures resemble buttocks and breasts and employ erotic cultural signifiers in their shape and decoration. Davidson's work spans art media but centers around sculpture. It is largely post-minimal in character and described by commentators as providing a feminist counterpoint to the male-dominated, minimalist sculpture of the 1960s, as well as to cultural tropes involving bodies that the works themselves invoke. Of particular note are Davidson's use of humor and a sense of absurdity to seemingly both celebrate and subvert these tropes, inviting their investigation but without the seriousness and moralism that often accompany critical works. Sculpture Magazine critic Robert Raczka wrote that "The confectionary color and oversize scale" of Davidson's sculpture creates a "playfully upbeat mood that allows feminist and gender issues to rise to the surface at irregular intervals, without didacticism." The New Art Examiner's Susan Canning described it as establishing "a context where all can revel in the transgressive and liberating power of the grotesque."

Davidson’s work has also been covered in the New York Times, Artforum, Art in America and Der Spiegel, among other publications, and recognized with a Guggenheim Fellowship, Pollock-Krasner and Creative Capital grants, and an Anonymous Was a Woman Award, among others. She lives and works in New York City.

== Life and career ==
Born and raised in Chicago, Davidson was involved in art from an early age, observing her father paint landscapes and later, attending classes at Chicago's Junior Art Institute. After receiving a bachelor's degree in education in 1965 and beginning a lifelong, concurrent career in teaching, she studied art at the University of Illinois at Chicago and the School of the Art Institute of Chicago, earning a BFA and MFA, respectively. In 1975, she launched her professional art career in Chicago, producing paintings and drawings for several group and solo exhibitions before moving to New York in 1979. These early pieces, chosen for exhibition at Chicago's Art Institute and Museum of Contemporary Art as well as at the Walker Art Center in Minneapolis, were positively reviewed in Artforum and Art in America. After relocating to New York, she began using textiles in her work and showed steadily throughout the 1980s—in group shows at the MCA and Albright-Knox Art Gallery, and in solo exhibitions, mainly at Chicago's Marianne Deson Gallery.

In the early 1990s, Davidson's artwork shifted toward sculpture and she began creating the large balloon displays for which she is best known. Following this shift, her works were selected for group exhibits at the Whitney Museum, Aldrich Museum of Contemporary Art and Corcoran Gallery of Art, and appeared in solo shows at the Institute of Contemporary Art, Philadelphia (1999) and Contemporary Arts Center (2001) in Cincinnati, among other venues; she also appeared in the well-known feminist exhibition, "Bad Girls West" (1994). Davidson branched out into other media during this period, including video and photography. Over the next two decades, she had solo shows at Robert Miller Gallery (2001), Betty Cuningham Gallery (2012), the Boca Raton Museum of Art (2013) and the Krannert Art Museum (2020–1).

Concurrent with her professional art career, Davidson taught at a number of institutions, including University of Illinois Urbana-Champaign, Williams College, and State University of New York at Purchase College, where she completed a 24-year tenure.

Nancy Davidson, Lulu (1 of 3), latex and fabric, 48" x 24" x 24", 1993.

== Work ==
In her first two decades, Davidson worked primarily in painting, frottage drawing, and with textiles. In the early 1990s, she began experimenting with latex weather balloons, and by 1993 had begun showing the feminized, anthropomorphic sculptures for which she became known. Her exhibitions are traditional in the sense that they contain discreet works, but she often displays the works in tableaux or as part of an immersive environment, in the manner of installation art.

Davidson's sculpture is said to draw on work by sculptors Donald Judd and Eva Hesse and she has cited them as influences, together with literary figures Mikhail Bakhtin and Jeanette Winterson. Her work has also been called "Rabelaisian," after French writer François Rabelais, whose writings enacted social critique through their satirical use of bawdy humor and the grotesque.

The subject matter and materials used—together with the size and minimal character of the pieces—have led commentators to describe Davidson's work as a markedly feminist response to the masculine, minimalist sculpture of the 1960s. While Davidson's sculptures echo these works in scale and level of abstraction, their soft pliability, light weight and ebullient femininity stand in sharp contrast with the rigid and heavy, sober works cast in steel and concrete by the artist's predecessors. Davidson has confirmed the intentionality of this contrast in interviews, stating that she designed one of her largest pieces, Double Exposure (2003), to be a feminine counterpoint to artist Ronald Bladen's giant "X" sculpture (The X, 1965), which, in 1967, occupied the same atrium space at the Corcoran Gallery of Art for which Davidson's piece was commissioned. Critics also see a subversive feminist ethos in the way Davidson's art employs cultural tropes involving bodies and desirability, noting that any subversion is achieved subtly. Art in America's Travis Diehl wrote that "[Davidson's] work is light and playful, as well as genuinely erotic, which makes our involvement with it more experiential than intellectual. Her sly seduction shows us to be objectifiers as well as objectified, illuminating our roles as both accomplices and victims."

Brightly colored, large, and bearing references to pop-culture icons like Elvis Presley and Mae West, the sculptures appear to celebrate the exaggerated forms of culturally idealized bodies while simultaneously undermining the forces behind them. Artforum's David Frankel wrote, "there is a certain hilarity and even joyfulness in their comically rounded bulges and furrows, in their colors and fussy corsetry," further noting that Davidson's work "examines the roles imposed on women in the theater of male expectation while also allowing a space for women to act in that theater without being limited by it—in effect, by taking over the play." Humor, limitation and the transcendence of limitation are common themes in her art, and the artist has cited the latter—which she calls "unruliness"—as being a key inspiration to her work.

=== Early balloon sculptures ===
Davidson's work spans multiple art disciplines but she is best known for large, inflatable abstract sculptures that erotically reference the human female form. Fashioned from latex weather balloons, the works have a bulbous, fleshy appearance and are seen as hyper-feminized abstractions of erogenous body parts—a visual interpretation reinforced by Davidson's use of fishnet lace, rope, and other culturally eroticized textiles to adorn, constrict and shape the tautly inflated forms. One early configuration involved constricting single balloons with a corset and featured bifurcated bulges on both top and bottom, mimicking the curves of buttocks and breasts. This design gave rise to several works and the artist—as well as critics—began referring to the corseted pieces collectively as "lulus," after a 1993 triad with that name. Other lulu-type pieces include Maebe (1994) and Blue Moon (1998), which reference Mae West and Elvis Presley, respectively. Blue Moon (1998) was included in the group show, "Sculpture-Figure-Woman" (Landesgalerie, 1998) which originated in Linz, Austria and travelled to Chemnitz, Germany; the piece was subsequently featured in Der Spiegel magazine.

Davidson's stable of undergarment-clad works also include the egg-like Netella (1998), as well as Buttress (1998) and Dulcinea (1999)—two pillar-like stack sculptures over fifteen feet high. As with Lulu, Davidson revisited Buttress, reprising it with the similar but distinct, bright green Stacked in 2016. Hang 'Em High (1999), was nearly twenty feet square and featured side-by-side red spheres veiled by netting and hung by a rope, which also bound the piece vertically at the center.

The latex period also saw the introduction of a recurrent, literal "gaze" theme in Davidson's sculpture, by way of spherical forms that overtly reference the human eye. In her 1998–9 piece, Carnivaleyes, twelve fabric-wrapped pairs of eyes form a wall, their gazes askance. In 2001, she created a twelve-by-fifteen-foot-square installation at the Contemporary Arts Center that featured a mound of cartoonish eye pairs presented with an immersive sound element. In her 2017 piece, Eyeenvy, a 14-ft-high eyeball looks down on viewers from atop a four-legged platform.

Nancy Davidson, Dustup, vinyl coated nylon, rope, leather, blowers, sandbags and sawdust, 240” x 240” x 192”, 2012.

=== Later sculpture ===
In the early 2000s, Davidson began using vinyl-coated nylon as a primary sculpture material. The Corcoran Gallery commissioned Davidson in 2002 to create a piece for its 47th Biennial, and she produced Double Exposure, a 34-foot by 20-foot-square nylon work that filled one side of the museum's atrium. Echoing her latex piece Hang 'Em High, the installation featured an anthropomorphic red double-sphere, viewable from both above and below and suspended from the center by a thick blue rope.

In 2005, a Creative Capital Artist Grant funded research for a new body of work—an exploration of the cowgirl archetype. The results were exhibited in her solo shows, "Dustup" (2012) and "Let 'er Buck" (2013), and featured giant nylon inflatables together with other types of work. The piece Dustup (2012) is based, according to Davidson, on the classic-comic convention of portraying skirmishes as "dustballs" and takes the form of three bulbous, boot- and tassel-clad forms in pink, yellow and blue, suspended around a central point, "legs up." The piece Let 'er Buck (2013) poses the pink character from Dustup singly, in a standing posture.

Between 2016 and 2018, Davidson did multiple solo exhibitions—including "Ridin' High" (2016) and "Per Sway" (2017–8), both of which featured new veins of work. One prominent theme involved the relationship of privilege to vantage point and had eyeballs and knots of various character mounted atop platforms of various heights.

Nancy Davidson, Hive, fabric, LED, blowers, electronic wiring, fabric, computer, 222” x 144” x 144”, 2020, Krannert Art Museum.

In 2020, Davidson collaborated with Lakshmi Ramgopal to create the exhibition "Hive" at the Krannert Art Museum, a year-long, immersive installation that includes sculpture, sound and light. Two eighteen-foot-high Davidson sculptures fill the glass-enclosed entrance to the Krannert's Kinkead Pavilion, while a soundscape created by Ramgopal projects abstract vocalizations of breath, including inhales, sighs and hums. Davidson's Hive inflatables are soft, pink and rounded, and contrast with the hard, angular qualities of the postmodern-style pavilion. The dual sculptures are internally lit and flash in a programmed pattern. Hive appears to have derived from a smaller, similar Davidson piece—Bigarurre—which was included in the artist's 2017–8 solo show, "Per Sway."

=== Photography and video ===
In addition to sculpture, Davidson has also produced photographic and video works, many of which use her sculptures and art materials as subjects.

In her solo show, "nobutsaboutit" (1998, 1999), Davidson exhibited multiple series of images she created from photographs of two of her sculptures: Musette (1994) and Spin Too! (1995). The images frame details of the sculptures and mirror them along the center line for a symmetrical effect which—in line with Davidson's three-dimensional works—references the cleaved curves of buttocks and breasts. Because of the close-up, cropped nature of the scenes, the inanimate origin of the images is somewhat disguised, leaving viewers to believe it could be human. The feminist undertones of the series have been noted by reviewers, including New York Times critic Ken Johnson, who wrote, "By constructing such images instead of photographing real women, Ms. Davidson means to reflect on the media's construction of women as objects of desire, and she does so in works that are, like the icons they evoke, from Mae West to Marilyn Monroe, seductive and slyly ironic."

In 1999, Davidson exhibited her first video work, Breathless (1999), as part of the immersive media for a show of her works at Philadelphia's Institute of Contemporary Art. It captured a pink weather balloon in its deflation process bouncing around a room, interspliced with scenes of the balloon being inflated and overlaid with balloon sounds. In 2009, her rodeo research for the cowgirl project led to the creation of All Stories Are True, a five-minute, slow-motion video of men performing rodeo. The video was overlaid with enhancements, including a visual and audio camera-flash effect and slowed-tempo music. She also produced a 7-minute video of the Gotham Girls Roller Derby titled I Am Not Tame (2016), meant to be played on loop in a video installation.

== Public recognition ==
Davidson has been recognized with a Guggenheim Fellowship (2014), Anonymous Was a Woman Award (1997), and grants from the Pollack-Krasner Foundation (2001, 2015), Creative Capital (2005), Massachusetts Council of the Arts (1981, 1984) and National Endowment for the Arts (1979). She has received artist residencies from Yaddo, MacDowell and Djerassi.

Commentators have also noted that Davidson's 1990s work intersects with—and appears to have foreshadowed—cultural shifts in body image and desirability that became prevalent in the 2010s. At MTV's 2019 Video Music Awards, a performance by singer Lizzo featured a set prop—a large inflatable buttocks sculpture—that resembled Davidson's work. Others have drawn comparisons between Davidson's sculptures and the buxom body image popularized by media stars such as Kim Kardashian.
