= Anthropology in Morocco =

Anthropology in Morocco is the history, themes, and publications of ethnography and fieldwork conducted in the country.

Many scholars conducted their fieldwork in Morocco and "published monographs that put the country in the center of anthropological debates on the nature of fieldwork (Dwyer 1982; Rabinow 1977), ethnographic writing (Crapanzano 1980; Munson 1984), and Islam (Eickelman 1976; Geertz 1968; Gellner 1981a)."

== History ==
Early writing about Moroccan culture came from travel memoirs of Europeans who went to Morocco on diplomatic or colonial or religious missions.

Many anthropologists started their interest in Morocco through the US Peace Corps program.

Later a e, written by Carleton Coon, an OSS agent turned Harvard anthropologist wrote his memoirs,

In the 1960s, Clifford Geertz and Hildred Geertz along with their students lived in Sefrou, Morocco near the Atlas Mountains.

== Anthropology as a Discipline ==
Within Morocco, anthropology is rarely taught as a field of study. Many students within Morocco study culture through the discipline of sociology.

== Notable Anthropologists ==
- Aomar Boum
- Jacque Berque
- Vincent Crapanzano
- Kevin Dwyer
- Dale F. Eickleman
- David Montgomery Hart
- Clifford Geertz
- Ernest Gellner
- Deborah Kapchan
- Fatima Mernissi
- Rachel Newcomb
- Susan Ossman
- Stefania Pandolfo
- Paul Rabinow
- Lawrence Rosen
- Susan Slyomovics
- Emilio Spadola
