= Greg Drasler =

American painter

- Born: 1952 (age 73–74); Waukegan, Illinois, U.S
- Education: University of Illinois at Urbana-Champaign
- Known for: Painting
- Spouse: Nancy Davidson
- Awards: Guggenheim Fellowship, Pollock-Krasner Foundation, National Endowment for the Arts, New York Foundation for the Arts
- Website: Greg Drasler

Greg Drasler, On the Lam, oil on linen in two panels, 70" x 160”, 2011.

Greg Drasler is an American artist known for metaphorical paintings that mix vernacular imagery and decoration and visual and interpretive conundrums. His work explores the construction of identity and memory through painted subjects that range from elaborately constructed interiors to symbolic common objects to patterned panoramas of the American highway. Although representational, Drasler's work eludes defined aesthetic categories such as realism, incorporating elements of surrealism, abstraction, and postmodern bricolage and recontextualization. In an early Art in America review, Robert G. Edelman wrote that Drasler "shares with Magritte the ability to create images that are both convincing and profoundly disorienting"; Jonathan Goodman described his later paintings as enigmatic puzzles meant to be meditated on, as both "visual metaphors for self" and formal statements existing for the sake of psychological mystery. Drasler has been awarded a Guggenheim Fellowship and grants from the Pollock-Krasner Foundation, National Endowment for the Arts and New York Foundation for the Arts. His work has been shown at the New Museum, PS1, Whitney Museum Stamford, Artists Space and Carnegie Museum of Art, and reviewed or featured in Art in America, Flash Art, New Art Examiner, The Paris Review, and The New York Times. Drasler lives in Tribeca, New York City with his wife, artist Nancy Davidson, and teaches at Pratt Institute.

== Early life and career ==
Drasler was born in Waukegan, Illinois in 1952. He was influenced in the 1960s by seeing James Rosenquist's room-spanning F-111, as well as the work of H. C. Westermann and Chicago Imagists such as Jim Nutt and Roger Brown, and studied art at the University of Illinois at Urbana-Champaign. In 1978, a fire destroyed all of his possessions and artwork in diverse media, except for two paintings; afterwards, he committed to painting as his medium. After earning a BFA (1980), he enrolled in the school's Year in Japan Program, which heightened an interest in the relationship between place and identity and encouraged his future use of vernacular imagery.

in 1983 after completing his MFA, Drasler moved to New York City and began exhibiting professionally. In his first decade there, he appeared in two shows curated by Marcia Tucker at the New Museum (the inaugural "On View," 1983; "Other Man: Alternative Views of Masculinity," 1987), as well as group exhibitions at Berggruen Gallery (San Francisco), Jack Tilton and Artists Space (New York), Carnegie Museum of Art, and Knoxville Museum of Art. Early solo exhibitions took place at the R.C. Erpf (1985–7) and Shea & Beker (1990) galleries in New York and Marianne Deson (1988) and Center for Contemporary Art (1990) in Chicago.

In subsequent years, Drasler has had solo exhibitions in New York (Queens Museum of Art, 1994; Betty Cuningham Gallery, 2007–16), Boston, California, Chicago and Seattle; he has appeared in group shows at the New Museum, PS1, Whitney Museum Stamford, and Weatherspoon Art Museum, among others. Drasler has been a member of the Fine Arts faculty at Pratt Institute since 2005, and prior to that, taught at Montclair State University, Princeton University, Hofstra University and Williams College.

Greg Drasler, Baggage Claim, oil on canvas, 80" x 70”, 1990.

== Work and reception ==
Drasler's paintings explore liminal spaces and thresholds between places or states of being (inside and out, here or there, public and private, real and imaginary, object and environment); these include suitcases, bedrooms, automobile interiors, the American highway and roadhouse, and film sets. He employs strategies of bricolage, recycling and displacement, packing his images with signs, symbols, metaphors, pattern and design, visual puzzles and puns. These elements convey humor, nostalgia, and a sense of the uncanny in examinations of the self and its relationship to personal space, location, and local culture.

=== Figurative and "Baggage" paintings (1983–1990) ===
Drasler's early work focused on home builder and handyman imagery that functioned as an allegory for self-construction. After moving to New York, he began painting objects that served as human stand-ins and lone figures, often with unexpected props, in forlorn landscapes. Reviewers described them as hovering between memory and dream, noting in figurative works, such as Headlights (1986), Laocoön (1987) or Mercury Rising (1990), a sense of isolation and visual conceit that sometimes alluded to the miraculous or mythological.

His "Baggage Paintings" (1987–90) depict plush period gear in apparently random but carefully composed states—stacked (Samson and Delilah), rifled through (Customs), grouped (Deposed or Baggage Claim)—that imply allegories of identity, luxury and privacy, and toy with conventions of literature and representation, such as the still life, landscape and Minimalism. Critics such as Robert Berlind describe them as meticulously detailed with "virtuosic, fluid brushwork" emphasizing the play of reflected light and color and a playful style that lulls viewers into a "cheery complicity" often undermined by darker elements. With Samsonite (1990)—a wide-open, empty suitcase with fabric lining like rumpled sheets, implying a private, sexual component—Drasler signaled his shift in the next two decades to interiors as sites for exploring subjectivity.

Greg Drasler, Changing Room, oil on canvas, 80" x 70”, 1994.

=== Interiors (1990–2010) ===
Drasler's "Cave Painting" works depict intricately constructed, ornate interiors that serve as metaphors for the interior construction of the self and the human relationship to personal, domestic space. They pair his interests in contemporary psychoanalytic theory and home design—architecture, ornament, wallpaper and fabric—in theatrical, film set-like scenes characterized by human absence, visual conundrums, and trompe-l'œil obfuscation. In formal terms, critics note the work's technical facility, illusionistic perspective, and effective blend of periods and motifs, noting links to Vuillard's confined spaces, eighteenth-century idealizations of nature, and the Baroque; in psychological terms, they suggest it draws viewers in voyeuristically, through a dreamlike, vaguely unsettling presence and furtive signs that imply the traces left in vacated rooms or closely guarded secrets.

Drasler created enigmatic, Magritte-like formal and psychological puzzles in paintings such as Changing Room (1994), whose surreal trompe-l'œil draped sheets, mirror reflections and painted landscape mural camouflage both architecture and purpose. Robert G. Edelman suggests these paintings slowly reveal "wry and portentous secrets" like Velázquez's Las Meninas or De Chirico's piazzas, which similarly resist resolution. In other paintings, such as Restless Bedroom (1992), Drasler conveys a more animate spirit with enveloping swaths of fabric or nature motifs that blur boundaries between organic and man-made, inside and outside, and figure and ground. He also introduced suspended common objects (a tomato pincushion in Green Room, 1995; linked hangers in Mobile, 2001) and symbolic wallpaper patterns into his work (a bluebird and birdcage, beehive, and ball and chain in Facts of Life, 1995) that allude to psychosexual dramas to untangle.

Greg Drasler, Tattoo Parlor, installation, Grand Central Art Center, California State University Fullerton, Santa Ana California, 2005.

In his "Tattoo Parlor" series, Drasler continued to explore wallpaper patterns (on canvas and as an installation environment), using familiar iconography and playing off the idea of the imprint places leave on their occupants. His "Jesus Wallpaper" consisted of straightforward, loosely rendered iconic images of Jesus, which appeared as backgrounds in a series of room paintings (1995–7) of assorted hanging objects (jumper cables in Jumping Jesus, a wallet in Profit, a pencil in 2B Jesus). "Tattoo Parlor" was fully realized—with the paintings hung on hand-painted, Jesus Wallpaper-patterned walls—during his residency at Djerassi Foundation (1996) and in installations at PS1 (the group show "Get Busy", 1997) and California State University at Fullerton (solo show, 2005). Drasler also employed pattern in his "Hats Paintings" (1988–2012), approaching abstraction in canvasses filled edge-to-edge with seas of anonymous men in subtly shaded fedoras, their faces turned away or hidden beneath the hats.

=== Road trip and automobile-related works (2006– ) ===
In the 2000s, Drasler's investigations of interior and liminal spaces expanded to include Hollywood illusionism, automobile interiors, and the American road trip. A tour of the former Metro-Goldwyn-Mayer Studios drew his attention to cutaway automobile props used for filming, which he noted exist as both interior and exterior spaces and as windows to the world. He employed them in visually enigmatic paintings such as Green Screen (2006), Road Trip (2006) and Internal Combustion (2010), set against backdrops or green-screens; the backgrounds, representing the potential of inexhaustible, to-be-determined locations, extended metaphors regarding the freedom and imaginative capacity offered by the automobile.

With the show "On the Lam" (2011), Drasler examined automobile interiors as sites of independence, seclusion, fantasy, and a cinema-like screening of experience. He packed the pictorial frames (including the depicted windscreens) of works such as On the Lam with objects, decorative and Native American patterns (Rain Dance), and Americana travel references. Reviewers have described these paintings as raucous works of visual wit and poignancy, nostalgic evocations of 1950s interstate travel, old hand-colored postcards and 1960s concert posters, and fantastical, inexplicable assemblages that simultaneously recall elements of the work of Roger Brown, the Pattern and Decoration movement, and Philip Pearlstein.

Drasler used his 2014 Guggenheim Fellowship to drive cross-country, gathering ideas that would emerge in his "Road Trip" works. He drew inspiration from the expansive, big-sky vistas of the Midwest and the vernacular architecture of the American roadhouse. He reconfigured these inspirations on canvas with crazy-quilt patterning suggesting both the landscape's vast reach and its man-made division into property. A key work was the six-panel, 400-inch Stratocaster Suite (2016), which was displayed in a narrow room so as to unfold for viewers in time like a road-trip landscape or Muybridge stop-motion sequence.

== Collaborative projects ==
Drasler's allegorical hanging-object paintings of the 1990s were influenced by psychologist Christopher Bollas's concept of the unthought known; he contributed an essay, "Painting into a Corner: Representation as Shelter," to the book The Vitality of Objects: Exploring the Work of Christopher Bollas (2002), edited by Joseph Scalia. He collaborated with poet Timothy Liu on the book Polytheogamy (2009), consisting of interleafed images of Drasler's paintings with Liu's poetry. Beginning in 2011, he produced a series of video interviews with Nancy Davidson documenting the lives and work of artists, including Don Dudley, Judith Linhares, Thomas Kovachevich and Matt Freedman, which appear on the website Romanov Grave.

== Awards and public collections ==
Drasler has been awarded a Guggenheim Fellowship (2014), a Helen L. Bing Fellowship (1996), and grants from the Pollock-Krasner Foundation (2019), National Endowment for the Arts (1993), and New York Foundation for the Arts (1991), among others. He has also received artist residencies from Djerassi (1996) and the MacDowell Colony (1986). His work belongs to several public art collections, including those of the New Museum, Krannert Art Museum, Fisher Landau Center, University of Illinois at Urbana-Champaign, and Dow Jones & Company.
