= Werner Klotz =

German-American artist

Werner Klotz (born in Bonn, Germany) is an artist based in Berlin and New York, working in the fields of public art, installation and interactive art.

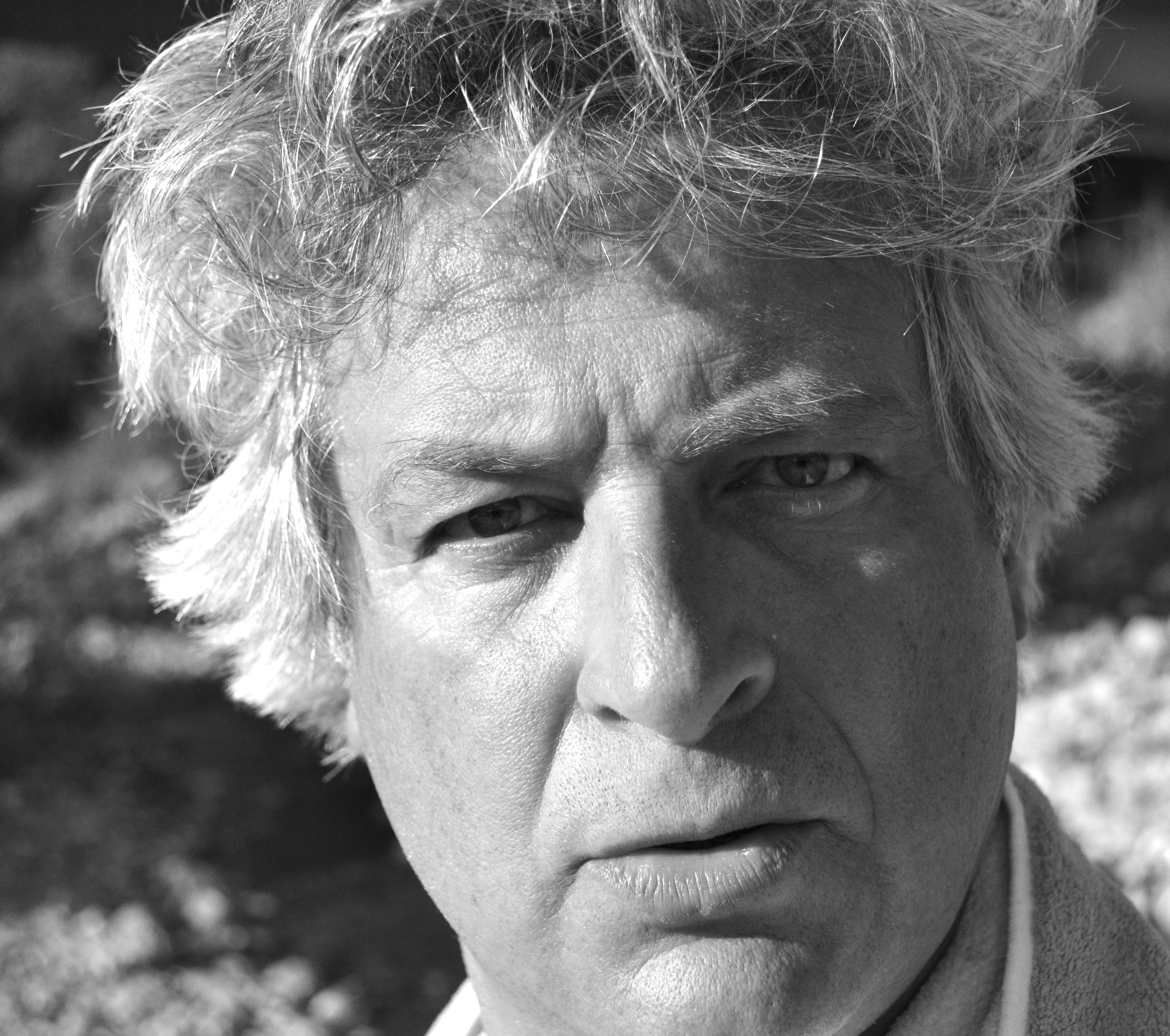
Werner Klotz

== Life and career ==
Werner Klotz was born in Bonn, Germany. In 1974 he moved to West Berlin.

He worked first as a painter then as a sculptor and installation artist. His work relies on natural contexts.

In 1981 he cofounded the artist group Material&Wirkung e.V., Berlin (Material&Effect), they organized art projects in public context and early installation art till 1985.

In 1982 he began a complex body of work with live Roman Snails (Helix Pomatia L.) in conserving their trails in time, space and movement-based art works as well as performances and interventions.

In 1990 he moved to San Francisco and became 2007 also US citizen. His work at this time included the development and fabrication of functional optical instruments and installations. These Perception Instruments are the foundation of this public art works leading to the present day.

His current artworks make use of site-specific and interactive contexts that rely on viewer participation to emphasize themes and ideas unique to each project. Using a variety of materials and strategies including light, sound, video and mechanics.

Using a variety of materials and strategies including light, sound, video and mechanics, these installations engage viewers in ways that address their orientations towards a site and serve as instruments for perception into what makes each site, and each viewer, a unique point of view.

Projects include a permanent video-light and sound installation onboard of three Staten Island Ferry's bridge deck in New York City. The multimedia installation provides passengers with a different experience with every crossing.Steered by the ferries GPS navigation system the installation uses sound, video, light and mechanics to explore nautical and geographical themes in a time-based manner.the video component is a viewing portal of highly polished steel housing a sonar graphically generated view of the undersea floor between Manhattan and Staten Island.

In the Bay Area is permanently on view since 2004: Anemone, an interactive kinetic sculpture at the San Francisco International Airport.

From 2014-18 he realized three large scale kinetic light art works for the new sculpture park Dosse Park in Wittstock, Germany.

In 2021 Werner Klotz created the 13 channel video sculpture Candelabro commemorating the Portuguese Diplomat Aristides de Sousa Mendes who saved thousands of refugees fleeing Nazi-occupied France. This artwork was commissioned by the New York Sousa Mendes Foundation. Candelabro will be on permanent display starting in late 2027 at the TIKVA Jewish Museum in Lisbon, Portugal.

In collaboration with U.S. artist Jim Campbell Werner Klotz created 2023 at the Central Subway Station Union Square in San Francisco, CA commissioned b the SF Art Commission the meandering sculptue Silent Stream. The sculpture is 145 m long and between 3 and 6 m wide (450 x 9 - 18ft.). Using some 12,000 reflective stainless-steel discs, each varying in size and shape, the sculpture simulates the flow and water surface of a mountain stream. As the viewer moves, the sculpture appears to flow (a perceptual effect caused by the varying distortions of the reflective elements). A subtle light installation reacts to the gentle oscillating movements of the kinetic elements caused by the air pressure from the subway trains.

Together with german artist Thomas Moecker and the italian Architect Anna Dilengite he won the 3. prize for the competition of the German National Freedom and Unity Monument in Leipzig.

Lichter Oktober - Slogans of Resistance, explores memory as a process that takes history as a starting point for thinking about the future Protest slogans stretch between a "Kiosk" and a "Round Table" as a topographic, walkthrough sculpture of 300 x 9 x 7 Meters.

Werner Klotz is the recipient of the New York City Art Commission award for excellence in Public Art and the Marler Medien Kunst Preis- Raum-Medien - Germany's most respected Media Art Award.

Beside his sculptural art works Werner Klotz created a two-dimensional body of work with printed digital files based on compositions of video imagery stills from water surfaces filmed in Californian waterfalls. Together with his daughter Nanette (* 2004 in Vancouver) he discovered and researched a section of a creek in the wilderness north of Vancouver, BC and is still working on photographic compositions of water, current, light and mineral structures directly in this stream.

== Awards ==
- 2026 Nationales Mahnmal fuer die Opfer der kommunistischen Diktatur in Deutschland, Berlin, 2.Preis, (National Monument for the Victims of the Communist Dictatur in Germany, 2nd Price), with architect Anna Dilengite and artist Thomas Moecker
- 2024 Nationales Freiheits- und Einheits Denkmal 3.Preis, (National monument for peace and unity, 3rd prize) in Leipzig, Germany, with architect Anna Dilengite and artist Thomas Moecker
- 2002 New York City Art Commission Award for Excellence in Design of Public Art
- 2002 Marler Medienkunst-Preis, Raum–Medien, Museum Glaskasten, Marl
- 1999 Arbeitsstipendium (working grant), Stiftung Kunstfonds, Bonn
- 1998 Istanbul Stipendium, Senatsverwaltung für Kultur und Europa, Berlin
- 1997 Artist in residence, Djerassi Resident Artist Program, Woodside, USA
- 1996 Artist in residence, City Art Gallery Auckland, New Zealand
- 1994 Berliner Künstlerstipendium (artist working grant), Senatsverwaltung für Kultur, Berlin

== Public art commissions ==
- 2023 Silent Stream, Union/Market Central Subway Station, San Francisco, with artist Jim Campbell, San Francisco Art Commission
- 2021 Candelabro - Aristides de Sousa Mendes, 13 channel Video/Audio sculpture commissioned by the Sousa Mendes Foundation, New York
- 2019 Schlachtfeld( Battlefield), commissioned sculpture for Museum Dreissig Jaehriger Krieg, Wittstock, Germany
- 2014–17 Mitte der Welt (Middle of the World), permanent kinetic outdoor sculpture, Sonnenfänger (Sun Catcher), light sculpture and Wolkenhaus (House of Clouds), Kunsthaus Dosse Park, Wittstock
- 2011 Spiegelkabinett (House of Mirrors), Kindermuseum, Berlin
- 2006–09 Deutsche Telekom AG, Bonn, Commission and Prototypes for interactive bus stops, light sculptures and out of home furniture
- 2010 Flying Sails, SEATAC Airport Light Rail Station, commissioned two kinetic light sculptures, Soundtransit Public Art Program, Seattle
- 2004 Anemone, San Francisco International Airport, interactive kinetic sculpture, San Francisco Art Commission, SFO airport collection
- 2002–06 Le Milieu du Monde, Staten Island Ferries, Commission for a GPS steered Light-, Video- and Audio, Installation on all three bridge decks on each ferry, Department of Culture and Department of Transportation, New York City, USA
- 2000 Spiegel/Spiegel (Mirror/Mirror), Exercise Room, Exhibition concept and optical instrument building, Kinder- und Jugendmuseum, Munich
- 1999 Scala, Charité Universitätsklinikum, Berlin, permanent Installation historical Auditorium, Medizinhistorisches Museum, Berlin
- 1999 Colloquium Externum, permanent kinetic out door sculpture, Fachhochschule für Wirtschaft, (University of Business), Ludwigshafen
- 1997 Doors, Brenner Pass, out door sculpture, Italian/Austrian border

== Public collections ==
- Arp Museum Bahnhof Rolandseck, Landesmuseum Rheinland-Pfalz
- Berlinische Galerie, Landesmuseum Berlin
- Karl-Ernst Osthaus Museum, Hagen
- Kunstsammlung der Jenoptik, Jena
- Zentrum fuer Kunst und Medien, ZKM, Karlsruhe
- Museum-Dreissig Jähriger Krieg, Wittstock, Germany
- Neuer-Berliner Kunstverein (NBK), Berlin
- Sammlung-Haupt, Berlin
- Jugendmuseum, Exercise Room, City Collection Munich, Germany
- Historisches Museum der Pfalz, Speyer, Germany
- New-York City Art Commission, USA
- SFO-airport collection, San Francisco
- San-Francisco Art Commission, USA
- Sousa-Mendes Foundation, New York
- Targetti-Light Art Collection, Florence, Italy
- Tikva, Museu Judaico, Lisbon, Portugal

== Bibliography ==
- Peitz, Christiane, mind your step, Installation from Werner Klotz, Tagesspiegel, Berlin, 8/20/2023
- Lopez, Mario Jorge, Publico Magazine, Portugal, Neste Candelabro brilha o exemplo de um homem justo, 4/26/2021
- Kornhoff, Oliver and Mattern, Jutta, Das Auge ist ein seltsames Tier, Arp Museum Bahnhof Rolandseck, solo catalogue, Salon Verlag 2017
- Kacunco, Slavco, Spiegel-Medium Kunst. Zur Geschichte des Spiegels im Zeitalter des Bildes
- Mirror. Medium. Art. On the history of mirror in the age of image, Wilhelm-Fink Verlag, Munich, Germany, 2010
- Kimmelmann, Michael, Risks and Reward in the Art in the Open, in New York Times, 8/19/2005
- Kacunco, Slavco, Closed Circuit Video Installations, catalogue essay, Logos Verlag, Germany, 2004
- Prinz, Ursula, Sisyphus Flight, Zwischenspiel V, Berlinische Galerie, Landesmuseum, Berlin, 2003
- Freitag, Michael and others, Werner Klotz-Exercise Room, solo catalogue, Galerie der Jenoptic, Jena, Germany, 2000
- Daniels, Dieter, German Media Art 1980-2000, catalogue essay, ZKM, Karlsruhe, Germany, 2000
- Kunde, Harald, and others, Material & Wirkung, solo exhibition-catalogue, Kunsthaus, Dresden, Dresden, Germany, 1998
- Barzel, Amnon, Targetti Light Art Collection, catalogue essay, Florence, Italy, 1998
- Block, René and Angelika Stepken, Medienkunst aus Berlin, catalogue essay, Berlin, 1997
- Happel, Reinhold and others, Werner Klotz, solo exhibition catalogue, Kunstverein Braunschweig, 1996
- Fehr, Michael, Werner Klotz – Perception Instruments, solo catalogue, Karl Ernst Osthaus Museum, 1996
- Daniels, Dieter, Minima Media, catalogue essay, Medienbiennale, Leipzig, Germany, 1994
- Schultz, Bernd, René Pritikin and others, Werner Klotz, solo exhibition-catalogue, Stadtgalerie, Saarbruecken, Germany and Center for the Arts, San Francisco, 1994
- Haerdter, Michael, Werner Klotz – The Boreas Project, Kuenstlerhaus,-Bethanien, Berlin, 1992

== Teaching ==
Werner Klotz taught Installation, Social Sculpture and Public Art at the San Francisco Art Institute from 1997 - 2002

Social Sculpture at the California College of the Arts, Oakland, CA 2002 - 2003
