= Diana Cooper =

Diana Cooper may refer to:

- Lady Diana Cooper (1892–1986), British actress and socialite
- Diana Cooper (artist) (born 1964), American artist
