= Donald Doe =

Donald Doe may refer to:

- Donald Brian Doe (1920–2005) British archaeologist and architect
- Donald Gerrard Doe, American artist
