= (In My) Solitude =

1934 composition by Duke Ellington

Composition by Duke Ellington
- Published: 1934 by Milsons Music Pub.
- Recorded: January 10, 1934
- Genre: Jazz; pop (Note: The idea of playing like Duke, though, for me was just to be able to play, 'In My Solitude.' That was a pop tune. It was a very popular piece of music. Everybody loved it. It was a gorgeous piece of music and so things like that were on the charts of those days, if you will. There were no top 40 or anything like that but everybody had the sheet music to that, 'In My Solitude', and 'Mood Indigo' and 'Sophisticated Lady' and other songs that Ellington had recorded and that we heard on the radio all the time.); ballad
- Composer: Duke Ellington
- Lyricists: Eddie DeLange; Irving Mills

"(In My) Solitude" is a 1934 composition by Duke Ellington, with lyrics by Eddie DeLange and Irving Mills. It is considered a jazz standard and has been recorded numerous times by artists such as Billie Holiday and Ella Fitzgerald.

Ellington reportedly composed it in a recording studio in 20 minutes, as his orchestra had arrived with only three pieces to record and required another. It is in D♭ major and follows an AABA form (although "the IV chord in measure 3 is replaced by a II7 the second time"). According to Ellington, the title was suggested by trumpeter Arthur Whetsel.

== Reception and analysis ==
An AllMusic writer describes the composition as "at once optimistic in its tone but somber in its pace, conflicted with the emotions of bitter loneliness and fond remembrance". The mood of the song is set "in the very first phrase of the melody, with its ascent to the leading tone of the scale falling just short of the tonic, and in the seemingly unremarkable chord progressions that nevertheless manage to transform harmonic resolution into wistful resignation."

== Recordings ==
The first recording of the song was by Ellington on January 10, 1934. His second version, from September of the same year, reached No. 2 on the charts in 1935. The Mills Blue Rhythm Band's rendition reached No. 8 that year. "Solitude" was recorded at least 28 times between 1934 and 1942. Vocalist Billie Holiday recorded the song several times in the 1940s and 1950s, "with the world-weariness of the words matching to an almost disturbing degree her late-career persona". One of her renditions was added to the Grammy Hall of Fame in 2021. Writing in 2012, Ted Gioia commented that "for the most part, 'Solitude' serves as a tribute piece nowadays, often played in an overly respectful manner that captures more the sound than the spirit of [Ellington]".

== Sources ==
- Collier, James Lincoln (1991). Duke Ellington. New York: Macmillan. ISBN 978-0-02-722985-1.
- Crawford, Richard; Magee, Jeffrey (1992). Jazz Standards on Record, 1900–1942: A Core Repertory. Chicago: Center for Black Music Research, Columbia College Chicago. ISBN 978-0-929911-03-8 – via Google Books.
- Gioia, Ted (2012). The Jazz Standards: A Guide to the Repertoire. Oxford: Oxford University Press. ISBN 978-0-19-993739-4 – via Google Books.
- Green, Edward, ed. (2015-01-08). The Cambridge Companion to Duke Ellington. Cambridge University Press. ISBN 978-1-316-19413-3.
- House, Roger; Fox, James (2022). "The Triumph of the South End Shout". South End Shout: Boston's Forgotten Music Scene in the Jazz Age. Lever Press. pp. 173–187. doi:10.3998/mpub.12735924. ISBN 978-1-64315-047-5. JSTOR 10.3998/mpub.12735924.
- Kapchan, Deborah (2017-04-04). "Memoir & Metaphor as Method". In Kapchan, Deborah A. (ed.). Theorizing Sound Writing. Music/culture. Middletown, CT: Wesleyan University Press. ISBN 978-0-8195-7666-8.
- Radcliffe, Joe (1974-06-08). "Thank You Duke – Thousands Say Farewell to Ellington, A Prince Who Loved People Madly". Billboard. Vol. 86, no. 23. New York: Nielsen Business Media, Inc. p. 3.
- Taylor, Billy (2000-02-07). "Duke Ellington's Washington" (Documentary). Interviewed by PBS. PBS. Archived from the original on 2021-10-28.
- Tucker, Mark (1993). "The Genesis of "Black, Brown and Beige"". Black Music Research Journal. 13 (2). Columbia College Chicago: Center for Black Music Research: 67–86. doi:10.2307/779513. ISSN 0276-3605. JSTOR 779513.

== See also ==
- List of 1930s jazz standards
