= Mark Lilla =

American scholar (born 1956)

- Born: 1956 (age 69–70); Detroit, Michigan, U.S.
- Spouse: Diana Cooper

Academic background
- Education: University of Michigan (BS); Harvard University (MPP, PhD)
- Influences: Isaiah Berlin; Judith N. Shklar

Academic work
- Institutions: New York University; University of Chicago; Columbia University
- Website: marklilla.com

Mark Lilla (born 1956) is an American political scientist, historian of ideas, journalist, and professor of humanities at Columbia University in New York City. A self-described liberal, he typically, though not always, presents views from that perspective.

He was born in Detroit, Michigan, and was educated at the University of Michigan and Harvard University. After holding professorships at New York University and the Committee on Social Thought at the University of Chicago, he joined Columbia University in 2007 as a professor of the humanities. He lectures widely and has delivered the Weizmann Memorial Lecture in Israel; the Carlyle Lectures at Oxford University; and the MacMillan Lectures on Religion, Politics, and Society at Yale University.

From 1980-86 he was executive editor of the public policy quarterly The Public Interest.

He is married to the artist Diana Cooper. They have one daughter, Sophie Lilla.

== Career ==
Lilla's work has engaged with the contested heritage of the modern Enlightenment. His first book, G. B. Vico: The Making of an Anti-Modern examines an early figure in the European Counter-Enlightenment, and has an affinity with the works of Isaiah Berlin; with Ronald Dworkin and Robert B. Silvers, he edited the memorial volume, The Legacy of Isaiah Berlin in 2001.

In the 1990s he wrote widely on twentieth-century European philosophy, editing with Thomas Pavel the New French Thought series at Princeton University Press, and writing The Reckless Mind, a meditation on the "tyrannophilic" bent of twentieth-century continental philosophy. His wide-ranging study of modern political theology, The Stillborn God, based on the Carlyle Lectures delivered at Oxford University in 2003, was named one of the "100 best books of the year" by The New York Times Book Review and one of the 150 best books of the year by Publishers Weekly.

In 2015, he received the Overseas Press Club of America's award for Best Commentary on International News for a series of articles in The New York Review of Books on the French response to the terrorist attacks of that year. Those articles became part of The Shipwrecked Mind: On Political Reaction, a study of how nostalgia has shaped modern politics, from Middle America to the Middle East.

In the 2010s and 2020s he has also been involved in public debates over the future of American liberalism and the Democratic Party, which is the focus of The Once and Future Liberal. Lilla has staked out a centrist or classically liberal position critical of progressive identity politics.

His 2024 book Ignorance and Bliss: On Wanting Not to Know is an essayistic examination of the human will to ignorance. The book covers topics such as the Book of Genesis, Plato’s dialogues, Sufi parables and Sigmund Freud, exploring paradoxes of self-deception and fantasies to which it may lead, such as with mystics or prophets.

=== Fellowships and awards ===
He has been awarded fellowships by the Russell Sage Foundation, the Institut d’études avancées in Paris, the Rockefeller Foundation Bellagio Center, the Guggenheim Foundation, the Institute for Advanced Study, and the American Academy in Rome. In 1995 he was inducted into the French Order of Academic Palms.

== Books ==
- The Public Face of Architecture: Civic Culture and Public Spaces. Free Press. 1987.
- G. B. Vico: The Making of an Antimodern. Harvard University Press. 1994. ISBN 0-674-33963-0.
- New French Thought: Political Philosophy. Princeton University Press. 1994. ISBN 0-691-00105-7.
- The Reckless Mind: Intellectuals and Politics (Revised ed.). New York Review Books. 2016 [2001]. ISBN 9-78168137116-0.
- The Legacy of Isaiah Berlin. New York Review Books. 2001. ISBN 1-59017-009-1.
- The Stillborn God: Religion, Politics, and the Modern West. Knopf. 2007. ISBN 1-4000-4367-0.
- The Shipwrecked Mind: On Political Reaction. New York Review Books. 2016. ISBN 1-59017902-1.
- The Once and Future Liberal: After Identity Politics. HarperCollins. 2017. ISBN 978-0-06269743-1.
- Ignorance and Bliss: On Wanting Not to Know. Farrar, Straus and Giroux. 2025. ISBN 978-0374174354.

== See also ==
- American philosophy
- List of American philosophers
