= Don Dudley =

American painter

Don Dudley (born 1930, Los Angeles) is an American artist who has worked on both the West Coast and East Coast of the United States. His early work is associated with the Finish Fetish school in California of the late 1960s as well as with New York Minimalism of the 1970s. Dudley studied painting at the Chouinard Institute with Abstract Expressionist painter Richards Ruben.

Dudley relocated from Los Angeles to New York City in the early 1970s where he exhibited widely at venues such as the New Museum, the Queens Museum, the Whitney Museum of American Art as well as the List Visual Arts Center at M.I.T.

Dudley’s practice embraces drawing and painting by way of sculpture and installation. Throughout Don Dudley's seventy-year career, he has challenged artistic conventions and the traditional concept of painting by incorporating industrial materials in his work such as aluminum, lacquer, homasote and plywood.

== Career ==
Dudley lived and worked on the West Coast for thirty-eight years before relocating to New York City in 1969. Settling first into a loft on Broome Street in SoHo, he later became one of the early pioneers in TriBeCa—where his studio remains to this day. The analytical artistic approaches in New York—especially the visual language of grids, modularity as well as the aesthetics of industrial manufacturing—had an impact on the artist and shifted his work away from the early works made in Southern California. He focused his attention on structure and seriality, connecting his work to artists such as Anne Truitt and Donald Judd.

Throughout the 1970s and 1980s, Dudley explored modular and serial structures with monochromatic color schemes as well as site-specific spatial installations, exhibiting in “Corners” at MIT Vera List Art Center in 1979 and mounting solo shows at P.S.1 Contemporary Art Center in 1982 and New Museum of Contemporary Art in 1984. Select group exhibitions appeared at Contemporary American Painting at the Whitney Museum of American Art, New York, NY (1972); Double Take at New Museum of Contemporary Art, New York, NY (1978); and Activated Walls at the Queens Museum of Art, New York, NY (1984).

After a twenty-five year hiatus from exhibiting, Dudley's work was rediscovered in 2011. Recent solo exhibitions include Don Dudley: New Work, Magenta Plains, New York, NY (2022); Don Dudley: Early Work, Magenta Plains, New York, NY (2019); Don Dudley: Activated Walls and Recent Works, Galerie Thomas Zander, Cologne, DE (2018); Don Dudley: Recent Work, Magenta Plains, New York, NY (2017); Modular Spaces, Galerie Thomas Zander, Cologne, DE (2013); Don Dudley, I-20 Gallery, New York, NY (2011); and Don Dudley, Mendes Wood, São Paulo, BR (2011).

== Press ==
Ken Johnson of The New York Times writes, “Mr. Dudley, 80, was an active player in the turn to hedonistic simplicity in painting in the late 1960s and early ’70s, first as a Finish Fetishist on the West Coast and then, after moving to New York in the early ’70s, in the Mondrian to Brice Marden mode. Mr. Dudley was in the Whitney Museum of American Art’s 1972 Annual (a precursor to the Whitney Biennial), devoted to contemporary American painting.” Writing for East of Borneo (magazine), the critic Saul Ostrow provides another description of Dudley's work, which uses metallic and fluorescent paints developed for use in home decoration: "Dudley’s works appear at first to be monochromes, but they really aren’t. The colors range from a decoratively appealing palette of whites, to saturated yellows and violet and blue metallic (metal flack-looking) pigments. Liminal shifts of color and tone produce noticeably different spatial and perceptual effects." Writing for Art in America, Sarah Schmerler compares Dudley's work to his peers such as Richard Artschwager, Jennifer Bartlett and Anthony Caro.

== Collections ==
- Becton Dickinson, Paramus, NJ
- Blanton Museum of Art, Austin, TX
- Bowdoin College Museum of Art, Brunswick, ME
- Buffalo AKG Art Museum, Buffalo, NY
- Chase Manhattan Bank, New York, NY
- Dallas Museum of Art, Dallas, TX
- Foundation for Art and Preservation in Embassies, USA
- Oceanside Museum of Art, Oceanside, CA
- Prudential Insurance Co., New York, NY
- San Francisco Museum of Art, CA
- Shearman & Sterling, New York, NY
- Simpson Thatcher & Bartlett, New York, NY
- Southeast Banking, Miami, FL
- TRW, Cleveland, OH
- Whitney Museum of American Art, New York, NY
- William R. Mercer, Inc., New York, NY

== Personal life ==
Don Dudley lives and works in New York City and Kerhonkson, NY and is married to artist Shirley Irons.
