= Ricardo Valderrama Fernández =

Peruvian anthropologist, scholar, and politician (1945–2020)

Provincial Mayor of Cusco Province
- In office 17 December 2019 – 30 August 2020
- Preceded by: Víctor Boluarte Medina
- Succeeded by: Romi Infantas Soto

Deputy Mayor of Cusco Province
- In office 1 January 2019 – 16 December 2019

Personal details
- Born: April 3, 1945 San Jerónimo District, Cusco Province, Peru
- Died: August 30, 2020 (aged 75) Cusco, Peru
- Party: Movimiento Regional Tawantinsuyo; We Are Peru
- Children: Five
- Education: National University of Saint Anthony the Abbot in Cuzco; Pontifical Catholic University of Peru
- Profession: Anthropologist; Academic; Politician

Ricardo Valderrama Fernández (3 April 1945 – 30 August 2020) was a Peruvian anthropologist, scholar, and politician. Valderrama spent more than 40 years studying the lives of the Indigenous peoples of the Andes region surrounding Cusco. In 1977, he released his first book, "Gregorio Condori Mamani: An Autobiography", co-authored with his wife, anthropologist Carmen Escalante. Their book, which has been translated into seven languages, is considered a landmark in the field of Peruvian anthropology, as it focused on modern-day individuals within the lower classes of society.

Valderrama became Mayor of Cusco Province in December 2019, following the resignation of his predecessor, Víctor Boluarte Medina. Valderrama oversaw the provincial response to the COVID-19 pandemic in Cusco Province during the COVID-19 pandemic in Peru, which includes the city of Cusco, until his death in office from the virus in August 2020.

== Awards ==
- Guggenheim Fellowship - awarded in 2000
