= Don Doe =

American artist (born 1963)

- Born: 1963 (age 62–63); Ohio
- Education: Yale University School of Art
- Occupation: Artist
- Website: dondoe.com

Donald Doe (born 1963) is an American artist born in Ohio. He went to the Cleveland Institute of Art, and received his Master of Fine Arts in Sculpture from Yale University School of Art.

Some of his peers included artists, Lisa Yuskavage, Richard Philips, Sean Landers, and John Currin. To further his abilities to work with sculpture Doe worked as an Assistant Process Engineer at Tallix Art Foundry in Beacon, New York. He worked here for two and a half years, and met his future wife there. After receiving a grant from the Pollock-Krasner Foundation in 1991, Doe moved to Brooklyn's rich artistic culture.

He has worked as an illustrator for The New Yorker as well as other journals. He has also held art professor positions teaching sculpture, 3d design, and rendering at St. John's University and the New York School of Interior Design. Pieces of his work are owned by the Museum of Modern Art, the Art Institute of Chicago, Cornell University, among others.

== Early work ==
While Don Doe's work covers a range of subjects, his earliest work seemed to have a focus on the production of art. The uses of figures such as the artist's muse, dealer, studio assistance, and an over abundance of canvases portray the various moments within the completion of an artist's work. Alongside these pieces were male figures being engulfed in floods, on the remains of their former lives personified by the cars or houses they floated on. There is a collection of these works in the Deutsche Bank New York City, as well as the Piergoi Flat Files in Brooklyn. Alongside Doe's collection are a number of other artists represented by the Deutsche Bank New York that share his artistic strategies. These artists included, but are not limited to, Nina Bovasso, Tom Burckhardt, Ken Butler, Mark Dean Veca, Tim Maul, and Charles Spurrier.

Doe's work evolved into the focus of the female body. In an interview by Pierogi, Don Doe explores his thoughts on the transition into a new set of works; titled Scopophilia. These works depicted men taking photos of women in various poses. "I have another series of a solitary male utilizing a camera possibly as a voyeuristic device preparing to either document his female subject or keep a distance from her, a very open ended series without an outcome, but full of noir. I am working on two other series about pissing in public and another about gun hobbyists in the woods. So I guess the men illustrate a problematizing of the male gaze, and other blurred distinctions between life and the authoritative nudes of the masters, that an eventual installation will resolve." The male and female figures play into the viewer's understanding of social reality, as well as the classical masters who also painted nude figures. This is further explored in an interview of a 2003 show that Don Doe partook in. This review in The New York Times by Ken Johnson briefly goes over the way Doe's work interacts with mythology and male desire.

With loaded brushes on medium-size canvases, Mr. Doe paints heated close-ups of beautiful nude or partly exposed women. Lurking in the background of each is a man--or, in one case, a woman--with a camera. Each picture updates an ancient myth: the Expulsion, Leda and the Swan, Echo and Narcissus. But what is most immediately at stake is the connection between a psychology of voyeurism, exhibitionism and shame on the one hand, and the urgent sensuality of painting on the other. For all its material generosity, however, a certain stiff and laborious quality in his painting undermines the effect.

The works mentioned here differ greatly from the previous watercolors, showing his diverse material. In an article published by Deutsche Bank there is an exploration on Doe's variety of work. "Doe is concerned in maintaining a balance in which humorous commentary and the artistically self-referential, narcissism and melancholy are not locked into competition with one another, but remain in a state of suspension." This state of suspension is an essential aspect to Don Doe's work. The paintings are not meant to be entirely humorous, which is why they are placed comfortably alongside the narcissistic and melancholy themes of the work.

== Pirate Girls ==
Doe's work made another evolution in visual content. This new theme focused on female pirates in sensual poses, typically mimicking pin-ups. Doe created a work based on Moby Dick, but in his version of the epic he portrayed Ishmael as a pinup girl building a ship in a bottle much like he builds his own coffin. These oil paintings and watercolors portray pirate women, typically nude or scantly dressed, along with images of ships, either within bottles or upon the sea. While there is not a male figure within the images, the male gaze is still apparent; reflected onto the viewer. These images still mimic a humorous and sensual view of pin-up illustrations, while also questioning social norms and stereotypes. Don Doe uses poses and images from Jean-Honoré Fragonard's work, comic strips, history books, pornography, and illustration genres to create an alternate world where "women are dominatrix 'pirate gals' and men are as ships in a bottle. These phallically potent 'Pirate Gals' celebrate pinup representations and wear their sexuality as an identity."

These thoughts were explored in a book, Dangerous Waters by Andrea Inselmann. Dangerous Waters was published alongside Doe's group show at the Herbert F. Johnson Museum of Art at Cornell University where fellow artists Dylan Graham and Sally Smart were shown. The show had a strong theme of pirates, ships, and the vast ocean, which each of these artists demonstrates in their own way. The book shows images of the pieces displayed, as well as a group of articles that illustrates the forces at play within these artist's works. Within this text, Inselmann is able to bring to light some of the essential points Doe's work is making. "Blowing wide open boundaries that have been established for the sake of gender identification along gender lines," writes Inselmann, "Doe's images encourage us to consider recent theories of spectatorship that propose more fluid processes across gender lines."

These ideas are explored more within the text as well as his description on the Morgan-Lehman Gallery. The choice of featuring the woman figure within the mythos of the pirate is highly explicit and intentional. These "pirate gals" play out a fantastical sexual identity of freedom and power. To Doe, pirates represent freedom and empowering impulses. These traits have helped build the pirate as a pervasive icon within our culture. Doe plays on the multifaceted aspect of the pirate. Inselmann picks up on this, stating that:

The choice of creating images of women pirates is crucial to Doe's project for its symbolic quality. 'As a murderer, a thief, a colorful hero of adventure stories, an enemy of the state, a symbol of resistance to capitalist systems and personification of its worst imperatives, the pirate is an ambivalent and deeply fractured symbol' noted critic recently ... This split within the image of the pirate itself is reflected in Doe's work, which- at once sexist and feminist, real and surreal, unsettling and seductive- has a critical depth which is initially obscured by its pop qualities and direct emotive punch.

The use of pirate imagery allows the work to question some of the assumptions the iconic image holds. This is then framed in an image that is provocative and drenched in styles of a gendered past. It remains seductive, while employing a sense of freedom and surreal empowerment. In "Bodies Unbound, the Classical and Grotesque", a book published by the Herbert F. Johnson Museum of Art in 2012, an article explores Doe's work alongside Martha Rosler. The article states that "The Doe and Rosler images present confrontational and oversized female bottoms that sexualize the female form and engender discomfort in the viewer."

== Awards ==
- Ellen Bachtell Stocktell Fellowship, Norfolk, Ct (1980)
- Yale Honorary Scholarships (1985–87)
- Nancy Graves Traveling fellowship in Sculpture Yale School of Art (1987)
- Pollock-Krasner Foundation Grant (1991)
- Ludwig Vogelstien Foundation Grant (1992)
