= The Once and Future Liberal =

2017 English-language book by Mark Lilla

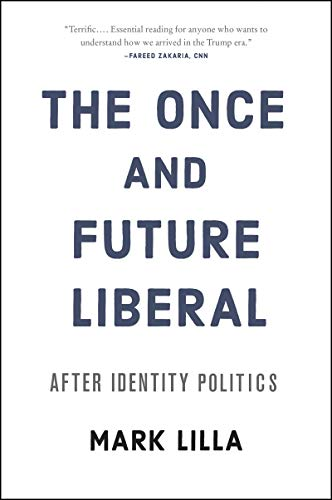
- Author: Mark Lilla
- Language: English
- Subject: Politics of the United States
- Publisher: HarperCollins
- Publication date: 2017
- Publication place: United States
- Media type: Print
- Pages: 143
- ISBN: 978-0-06-269743-1 (Hardcover)

The Once and Future Liberal: After Identity Politics is a 2017 book by humanities professor Mark Lilla, in which the author argues for U.S. liberals to emphasize commonalities as citizens in their politics, rather than differences of identity.
