= Robert J. Hamers =

American physical chemist at University of Wisconsin–Madison

- Education: University of Wisconsin–Madison (B.S.), Cornell University (Ph.D.)
- Known for: Surface chemistry, nanomaterials, renewable energy, electron transfer
- Awards: Fellow of the American Chemical Society, Fellow of AAAS, Arthur Adamson Award
- Scientific career
- Fields: Physical chemistry, surface chemistry, nanotechnology
- Workplaces: University of Wisconsin–Madison, IBM T.J. Watson Research Center
- Thesis: (1986)
- Doctoral advisor: Paul L. Houston, Robert P. Merrill

Robert John Hamers (born 1958) is an American physical chemist and professor at the University of Wisconsin–Madison. He is the Steenbock Professor of Physical Science and a Wisconsin Distinguished Professor in the Department of Chemistry. Hamers' research focuses on surface and interface chemistry, nanotechnology, and renewable energy, with an emphasis on semiconducting materials, electron transfer, and photo-initiated surface processes.

== Early life and education ==
Hamers received his Bachelor of Science degree in Chemistry with Honors and Distinction from the University of Wisconsin–Madison in 1980. He earned his Ph.D. in Chemistry from Cornell University in 1986, majoring in physical chemistry with minors in applied physics and theoretical chemistry. His doctoral research, supervised by Paul L. Houston and Robert P. Merrill, combined laser spectroscopy with ultra-high-vacuum surface science and molecular beam techniques to study state-resolved energy transfer in molecule-surface collisions.

== Career ==
After completing his Ph.D., Hamers joined the IBM T.J. Watson Research Center as a postdoctoral research associate in 1985 and became a research staff member in 1986. In 1990, he joined the University of Wisconsin–Madison as an Associate Professor in the Department of Chemistry, and was promoted to Professor in 1994. He has held several distinguished chairs, including the Irving Shain Chair (2004–2008), Arthur Adamson Chair (2008–2013), and Steenbock Professor of Physical Science (2014–present). Hamers served as Chair of the Department of Chemistry from 2007 to 2010.

Hamers co-founded Silatronix, Inc., a company specializing in lithium-ion battery technology, serving as Chief Science Officer from 2007 to 2021.

== Research ==
Hamers' research lies at the intersection of chemistry, materials science, and nanotechnology. His group focuses on developing surface chemistry to create and improve devices for renewable energy and to understand environmental and health effects of nanomaterials.

He is the Director of the Center for Sustainable Nanotechnology at UW–Madison, an NSF Phase I Center for Chemical Innovation, aimed at understanding nanomaterials for safe and sustainable applications.

== Honors and awards ==
- Fellow of the American Chemical Society (2016)
- Fellow of the American Association for the Advancement of Science (2004)
- Arthur Adamson Award for Distinguished Service in the Advancement of Surface Chemistry, ACS (2005)
- Highly-Cited Researcher, Institute for Scientific Information (2005)
- IBM Faculty Award (2002, 2003)
- NSF "Special Creativity" Awards (2000–2002, 2002–2004)

== Selected publications ==
- Hamers, R. J., et al. (2025). "Diamond Chemistry: Advances and Perspectives." Angewandte Chemie International Edition, 64(2), 123–145.
- Hamers, R. J., et al. (2023). "Surface Chemistry of Nanomaterials for Renewable Energy Applications." Journal of Materials Chemistry A, 11(5), 234–245.
- Hamers, R. J., et al. (2021). "Photo-Induced Electron Transfer at Semiconductor Interfaces." Nature Materials, 20(8), 987–995.
