= Z. S. Strother =

American art historian

Zoë S. Strother
- Occupation: Art historian
- Title: Riggio Professor of African Art
- Awards: Guggenheim Fellow (2000)

Academic background
- Education: Yale University

Academic work
- Discipline: African Art
- Institutions: Columbia University

Zoë S. Strother is an art historian. She serves as Riggio Professor of African Art at Columbia University. Her work focuses on 20th and 21st-century Central and West African art history.

She graduated from Yale University.

Strother was a 2000 Guggenheim Fellow. Her book Inventing Masks won the 2001 Arnold Rubin Outstanding Publication Award from the Arts Council of the African Studies Association. In it she describes masks as part of a larger performance and thus creative process. Against the Franz Boas vein of interpreting African art such as masks as a conservative matter of tradition, Strother’s fieldwork finds they are a site of invention and novelty, demonstrating the agency of the creators and wearers. Critics praised the book, saying the cover blurbs were “not hyperbole”.

== Works ==
- Inventing Masks: Agency and History in the Art of the Central Pende (University of Chicago Press, 1998) ISBN 9780226777337, OCLC 41258436
- Pende (5 Continents Editions, 2008) OCLC 148864715
- Vladimir Markov and Russian Primitivism: A Charter for the Avant-Garde with Jeremy Howard and Irēna Bužinska (Ashgate, 2015) ISBN 9781317001027, OCLC 973229740
- Humor and Violence: Seeing Europeans in Central African Art, 1850-1997 (Indiana University Press, 2016) ISBN 0253022673, OCLC 966825524
