= Vincent Crapanzano =

American academic

- Born: New York City, United States
- Occupations: Educator, Anthropologist
- Writing career
- Genre: Anthropology
- Notable works: Recapitulations, The Harkis: The Wound That Never Heals, Tuhami: A Portrait of a Moroccan

Vincent Crapanzano is Distinguished Professor of Anthropology and Comparative Literature at the Graduate Center of the City University of New York (CUNY).

== Biography ==
Vincent Crapanzano graduated from the Ecole Internationale in Geneva, received his A.B. in philosophy from Harvard in 1960 and his PhD in anthropology from Columbia in 1970. From 1961 to 1964, conscripted, he served in the U.S. Army, first at the Army Language School in Monterey and then in Frankfurt/Main.He has taught at Princeton, Harvard, the University of Chicago, the University of Paris (Nanterre), the Ecole des Hautes Etudes en Sciences Sociales, also in Paris, the University of Brasilia, and the University of Cape Town. He is the author of nine books, numerous papers and reviews in academic journals, as well as in The New Yorker, the New York Times, The Times Literary Supplement, and The Washington Post. Many of these have been translated into a broad range of languages or written in French. He has lectured at major universities and research centers in North and South America, Europe, North Africa, Lebanon, Hong Kong, and South Africa. He has been the recipient of numerous grants and awards, including those from the Rockefeller and Guggenheim foundations, and the Fulbright Program (Brazil). He was a Sherman-Fairchild Distinguished Scholar at the California Institute of Technology, a fellow at the American Academy in Berlin, a Jensen Memorial lecturer at the Frobenius Institute in Frankfurt, the President of the Society for Psychological Anthropology from which he received a Life Time Award. He has done fieldwork with the Navajo, the Hamadsha (a Moroccan Sufi order or tariqa), and White South Africans during apartheid, Christian Fundamentalists and legal conservatives in the United States, and the Harkis (those Algerians who served as auxiliary troops for the French during the Algerian war of independence).

== Work and thoughts ==
Crapanzano is an eclectic thinker, a firm believer in rigorous interdisciplinary studies, and severe critique of disciplinary parochialism. He prefers to speak not of anthropology but anthropologies. He often refers to cultural anthropology as a philosophical discipline, at least one that can serve as a corrective to the ethnocentrism of academic philosophy. Once, when asked how he would differentiate anthropology from sociology, he referred to anthropology as a science of the intimate. In many of his ethnographic works, he focuses on the individual, in his early works from a psychoanalytic perspective, later from a dialectical one, and more recently from a critical phenomenological one that stresses inter-subjectivity. He recognizes phenomenology's inherent limitations, which stem from its embeddedness in a particular language –its language of description— and, Husserl notwithstanding, from the threat posed by the possibility of solipsism and the stress on the opacity of the other characteristic of the epistemologies of modernity. He argues that as social actors we are destined to be bad epistemologists insofar as we have to assume, rightly or wrongly, that we can intuit what the other is thinking and feeling. He does recognize the possibility of other epistemologies; say those of the heart, which are not haunted by what transpires in the mind of the other. Though he had been considered a cultural relativist of a postmodern bent, he in fact advocates a heuristic relativism – one which brackets, as best one can, one's own cultural presuppositions, as one engages with other worldviews. He relates this stance to the way Keats referred to as negative capability. Ideally it furnishes one with a critical perspective on both one's own worldview and that of one's informants. But, underlying his thought is an at times pessimistic skepticism, which is tempered by irony. Irony, he claims, is sorely missing from the social sciences.

=== Field work ===
It was Crapanzano's experience in Morocco, working with the spirit possessed, that led him to question some of the fundamental presuppositions of psychoanalysis. In describing his interviews with an illiterate Moroccan tile maker, Tuhami, after whom he named one of his books, considered by many to be his most important, he came to realize how life stories and by extension other ethnographic findings are reformulated by the anthropologist in accordance with literary genre and conventions, rendering them more familiar but losing their unique cultural framing. This led him to consider the role of writing in anthropology generally and was one of the founders of what came to be known as the writing culture school of anthropology. It also led him to a close reading of several of Freud's case histories from a linguistic point of view, demonstrating how, for example, attributions of transference and countertransference were refractions of such linguistic functions as the pragmatic and the metapragmatic, that is the way speech figures its context and itself. Many of these articles were collected in Hermes’Dilemma and Hamlet’s Desire.

There has always been a split between Crapanzano's theoretical interests and his ethnographic writing, which is deeply rooted in fieldwork experience and literary form. Challenged by ethical relativism, he studied white South Africans at the height of apartheid. He found something ingenuous about the way in which anthropologists seemed always to focus on the downtrodden in their research on domination. In his book, Waiting: The Whites of South Africa, a study of a village in the Cape Province, which he called Wyndal, he argued that the two dominant white populations, the English-speakers and the Afrikaners, were caught in a dialectic imbroglio in which they each felt so wounded by the other that, though they talked about an imminent bloodbath, they tended to ignore the "reality" of the non-whites. Even the liberal whites who were opposed to apartheid rarely considered the subjective life of the victims of apartheid. Though privileged, the whites themselves were entrapped within apartheid system.

During his research in Wyndal, a conservative evangelical revival occurred among the whites, offering solace and escape to those without international connection and the possibility of flight in the event of a bloodbath. This probably led him to turn his attention to Christian Fundamentalists and legal conservatives in the United States. In From the Pulpit to the Bench, he argued that literalism, was prevailing interpretive style in America, extending well beyond the fundamentalists and the legal conservatism of Bork, Scalia and their ilk to popular understanding of DNA and trauma-centered psychotherapies. Unfortunately, he did not investigate latter. He noted ironically that while the academy was focused on the postmodern future of simulacra and semantical skidding, conservative evangelicalism was on the rise. Perhaps in reaction to the constraints of the Fundamentalists’ dogged literalism and fear of the imagination and figurative language (at least Crapanzano claims), he focused his Jensen lectures in Frankfurt on the creative play of the imagination, which were published in his book Imaginative Horizons. Here, as in his other books, he experimented with literary form, juxtaposing unconnected texts and events in order to produce in his readers the tension of the gap – the betwixt and between – between these texts and events.

Upon completing Imaginative Horizons, Crapanzano began doing research with the Harkis living in France. In The Wound that Never Heals and other publications, he considered the effect of betrayal and abandonment on the lives of the Harkis and their children and grandchildren, living in the very country that had in their eyes (and not without reason) betrayed and abandoned them.[4] He argued that so significant was the wound they shared that they subsumed their personal histories, their identities, to the Harki story. He referred to this story as a frozen discourse which, entrapping some, particularly the Harkis themselves, was a constant reference point for even those Harkis who adapted, some with considerable success, to France. He considered the role of forgiveness, destiny, and a sense of being owed (for the sacrifices the Harkis made for France and the losses they suffered) in their self-understanding. The picture Crapanzano drew was less tragic (though it was tragic) than pessimistic. He himself admits that this picture was tinged with his own pessimistic tendencies.

== Memoir ==
Given Crapanzano's stress on the individual, life histories, and the importance of self-reflection and self-positioning in anthropological research, it seems inevitable that he would turn to the consideration of his own life experiences. In Recapitulations, a self-reflective memoir – some have called it a meta-memoir – he reflects on the existential implications of both insignificant and significant events in his own life.[5] Taking ironic pleasure in the paradoxes in his life and by implication in the life of others, his self-questioning seems also to be questioning of the very questions he poses. In this way he leads his readers to question what they themselves take for granted in their own lives. Here, as in so much of Crapanzano's writing, his intentions are tempered by his irony.

== Principal books ==
- The Fifth World of Forster Bennett: A Portrait of a Navaho. New York: Viking, 1972.
- The Hamadsha: A Study in Moroccan Ethnopsychiatry. Berkeley:University of California Press, 1973.
- Tuhami: Portrait of a Moroccan. Chicago: University of Chicago Press, 1983.
- Waiting: the Whites of South Africa. New York: Random House, 1985.
- Hermes’ Dilemma and Hamlet’s Desire: Essays on the Epistemology of Interpretation. Cambridge: Harvard University Press, 1992.
- Serving the Word: Literalism in America from the Pulpit to the Bench. New York: The New Press, 2000.
- Imaginative Horizons: An Essay in Literary-Philosophical Anthropology. Chicago: University of Chicago Press, 2004.
- The Harkis: The Wound That Never Heals. Chicago: University of Chicago Press, 2011.
- Recapitulations. 2015. New York: The Other Press.
