= Anthony Feinstein =

Neuropsychiatrist

Anthony Feinstein (born December 14, 1956) is a professor of psychiatry at the University of Toronto and a neuropsychiatrist. His research and clinical work focuses on people with multiple sclerosis, traumatic brain injury and Conversion Disorder. He has undertaken a number of studies investigating how front-line journalists are affected by their work covering war and man-made and natural disasters.

== Education ==
Born in Johannesburg, South Africa, Feinstein received his medical degree from the University of Witwatersrand. He completed his Psychiatry training at the Royal Free Hospital in London, England. His MPhil and PhD degrees were obtained through the University of London. After obtaining his PhD, he worked as a Senior Registrar at the Maudsley Hospital in London before taking up an appointment at the University of Toronto where he is currently a professor of psychiatry and a clinician scientist at the Sunnybrook Research Institute.

== Multiple sclerosis ==
Over a three decade period, Feinstein's work has focused on determining brain imaging correlates of depression and pseudobulbar affect in people with MS. He has also developed computerized methods of detecting cognitive dysfunction, with a particular emphasis on the use of distracters. A third strand to his MS work relates to defining the cognitive and functional neuroimaging changes associated with the use of cannabis (marijuana) in people with MS. His research has been funded by MS Canada, the Canadian Institute of Health Research and the Progressive MS Alliance.

== Journalism work ==
In 2000 Feinstein obtained a grant from the Freedom Forum in Washington, D.C. to undertake the first study exploring how war can affect the psychological wellbeing of front-line journalists. The results were subsequently published in the American Journal of Psychiatry. Since then, he has completed studies investigating how journalists have been affected by the attacks of 9/11 in New York, the 2003 war in Iraq, the drug wars in Mexico, the 2007 election violence and Al-Shabab attack on the Westgate Mall in Kenya, the Civil War in Syria and state-sponsored violence directed towards the media in Iran the refugee crisis in Europe, Afghanistan (pre-Taliban), and online harassment. His team has developed the first psychometric scale for moral Injury in Journalism.

== Awards ==
Dr. Feinstein was awarded a Guggenheim Fellowship in 2000 to study mental health problems in post-apartheid Namibia. In 2019, he received the Distinguished Service Award from the Sunnybrook Health Sciences Centre MDMSA. In 2023, he was honored with the Giants of Multiple Sclerosis Award by the Consortium of MS Centres and NeurologyLive. A documentary, Journalists Under Fire, based on his work with war journalists, produced by him (and directed by Martyn Burke), was short-listed for an Academy Award and won a 2012 Peabody Award. His series of articles for The Globe & Mail on conflict photography was long-listed for a 2016 EPPY Award.

== Films ==
- A Quiet Courage: Afghan Journalists in a Time of Terror – Director, Producer, Writer

NewsFest International Film Festival, Las Vegas, USA (July 31, 2021) – *Winner: Best International News Story/Public Information* and *Best First Film (International)*.

== Books ==
- In Conflict (New Namibia Books, 1998, ISBN 978-9991631691)
- The Clinical Neuropsychiatry of Multiple Sclerosis (Cambridge University Press, 1999; second edition 2007, ISBN 978-0521880152)
- Dangerous Lives: War and the Men and Women Who Report It (Thomas Allen Publishers, 2003, ISBN 978-0887621314)
- Michael Rabin, America's Virtuoso Violinist (Amadeus Press, 2005; second edition 2011, ISBN 978-1574671995) Second Edition – paperback (2011). Audiobook (2017)
- Journalists Under Fire: the Psychological Hazards of Covering War (Johns Hopkins University Press, 2006, ISBN 978-0801884412)
- Battle Scarred (Tafelberg Press, 2011, ISBN 978-0624053743)
- Shooting War: 18 Profiles of Conflict Photographers (Glitterati/G Editions, 2018, ISBN 978-1943876570)
- Moral Courage: 19 Profiles of Investigative Journalists (G Editions/Glitterati, 2023, ISBN 978-1943876419)
- Behavioral Consequences of Multiple Sclerosis (Johns Hopkins University Press, 2022, ISBN 978-1421443249) Audiobook (2025)

== Media ==
- Shooting War: Paying homage to 12 conflict photographers – Series of articles for The Globe and Mail.

== Journalism publications ==
- Feinstein, A; Osmann, J; Patel, V (September 2018). "Symptoms of PTSD in Frontline Journalists: A Retrospective Examination of 18 Years of War and Conflict". Canadian Journal of Psychiatry. 63 (9): 629–635. doi:10.1177/0706743718777396. PMC 6109887. PMID 29792077.
- Feinstein, A; Pavisian, B; Storm, H (March 2018). "Journalists covering the refugee and migration crisis are affected by moral injury not PTSD". JRSM Open. 9 (3) 2054270418759010. doi:10.1177/2054270418759010. PMC 5846940. PMID 29552347.
- Feinstein, A; Osmann, J; Pavisian, B (2020). "Symptoms of posttraumatic stress disorder in journalists covering war and conflict: A study comparing photographers with print reporters". Traumatology. 26 (1): 35–39. doi:10.1037/trm0000207.
- Osmann, J; Page-Gould, E; Inbar, Y; Dvorkin, J; Walmsley, D; Feinstein, A (2024). "Validation of the Toronto Moral Injury Scale for Journalists". Traumatology. 30 (2): 133–142. doi:10.1037/trm0000409.
- Feinstein, A; Osmann, J (2024). "Predictors of psychological distress in frontline journalists: Common denominators across three decades of conflicts". Traumatology. 30 (3): 306–313. doi:10.1037/trm0000445.
- Marchetti, S; Feinstein, A (December 2024). "The Psychological Health of Iranian Citizens Protesting the Actions of Their Country's Morality Police: La santé psychologique des citoyens iraniens qui manifestent contre les actions de la police des mœurs de leur pays". Canadian Journal of Psychiatry. 69 (12): 861–868. doi:10.1177/07067437241295638. PMC 11562944. PMID 39523529.
- Feinstein, A; Storm, H; Mead, J; Sharkey, A (December 2025). "An examination of psychological distress and moral injury in journalists exposed to online harassment". European Journal of Psychotraumatology. 16 (1) 2522501. doi:10.1080/20008066.2025.2522501. PMC 12239111. PMID 40622752.

== Multiple sclerosis publications ==
- Feinstein, A; Freeman, J; Lo, AC (February 2015). "Treatment of progressive multiple sclerosis: what works, what does not, and what is needed". Lancet Neurology. 14 (2): 194–207. doi:10.1016/S1474-4422(14)70231-5. PMID 25772898.
- Feinstein, A (September 2017). "Multiple sclerosis: Treatment of cognitive impairment in secondary progressive MS". Nature Reviews Neurology. 13 (9): 515–516. doi:10.1038/nrneurol.2017.109. PMID 28752856.
- Plattner, IE; Mbakile-Mahlanza, L; Marobela, S; Kgolo, TJF; Monyane-Pheko, MMB; Patel, V; Feinstein, A (July 2019). "Developing a Computerized Brief Cognitive Screening Battery for Botswana: A Feasibility Study". Archives of Clinical Neuropsychology. 34 (5): 682–689. doi:10.1093/arclin/acy071. PMID 30165575.
- Feinstein, A (March 2021). "Wordsworth, Bellow, and understanding multiple sclerosis". Lancet Neurology. 20 (3): 177–178. doi:10.1016/S1474-4422(19)30222-4. PMID 31208881.
- Feinstein, A; Meza, C; Stefan, C; Staines, RW (September 2019). "Coming off cannabis: a cognitive and magnetic resonance imaging study in patients with multiple sclerosis". Brain. 142 (9): 2800–2812. doi:10.1093/brain/awz213. PMID 31363742.
- Feinstein, A; Amato, MP; Brichetto, G; Chataway, J; Chiaravalloti, N; Dalgas, U; DeLuca, J; Feys, P; Filippi, M; Freeman, J; Meza, C; Inglese, M; Motl, RW; Rocca, MA; Sandroff, BM; Salter, A; Cutter, G (May 2020). "Study protocol: improving cognition in people with progressive multiple sclerosis (COGEx)". BMC Neurology. 20 (1): 204. doi:10.1186/s12883-020-01772-7. PMC 7245035. PMID 32443981.
- Chiaravalloti, ND; DeLuca, J; Salter, A; Amato, MP; Brichetto, G; Chataway, J; Dalgas, U; Farrell, R; Feys, P; Filippi, M; Freeman, J; Inglese, M; Meza, C; Moore, NB; Motl, RW; Rocca, MA; Sandroff, BM; Cutter, G; Feinstein, A (October 2022). "The relationship between processing speed and verbal and non-verbal new learning and memory in progressive multiple sclerosis". Multiple Sclerosis Journal. 28 (11): 1783–1792. doi:10.1177/13524585221088190. PMID 35531965.
- Feinstein, A; Amato, MP; Brichetto, G; Chataway, J; Chiaravalloti, ND; Cutter, G; Dalgas, U; DeLuca, J; Farrell, R; Feys, P; Filippi, M; Freeman, J; Inglese, M; Meza, C; Motl, RW; Rocca, MA; Sandroff, BM; Salter, A (October 2023). "Cognitive rehabilitation and aerobic exercise for cognitive impairment in people with progressive multiple sclerosis (CogEx): a randomised, blinded, sham-controlled trial". Lancet Neurology. 22 (10): 912–924. doi:10.1016/S1474-4422(23)00280-6. hdl:2158/1356543. PMID 37739574.
- Feinstein, A (November 2023). "The CogEx trial – Commentary". Multiple Sclerosis Journal. 29 (13): 1523–1525. doi:10.1177/13524585231210178. PMC 10637105. PMID 37916484.
- Feinstein, A (June 2024). "Depression is a core symptom of multiple sclerosis: Commentary". Multiple Sclerosis Journal. 30 (7): 788–789. doi:10.1177/13524585241245637. PMC 11134993. PMID 38686697.
- Freedman, DE; Oh, J; Feinstein, A (2025). "Not for everyone: Factors influencing who receives psychotherapy in people with multiple sclerosis". Multiple Sclerosis and Related Disorders. 94 106245. doi:10.1016/j.msard.2024.106245. ISSN 2211-0348. PMID 39764908.
- Kever, A; Meza, C; Feinstein, A (July 2025). "Cannabis and Cognitive Function in Multiple Sclerosis: Findings From a Large Consecutive Clinical Sample". European Journal of Neurology. 32 (7) e70142. doi:10.1111/ene.70142. PMC 12228000. PMID 40616362.
- Feinstein, A; Bar-Or, A; Benedict, RH; Filippi, M; Freedman, DE; Kever, A; Meza, C; Rocca, MA (2025). "Is multiple sclerosis-related depression different from depression in general? The data for and against". Brain. 148 (12) awaf319. doi:10.1093/brain/awaf319. PMID 41251688.
