= Slavko Kacunko =

Croatian art historian

Slavko Kacunko, b. 1964 in Osijek (Croatia) was Professor for Art History and Visual Culture at the University of Copenhagen (Aug. 2011-Dec. 2019). His academic field is art- and culture history and media theory.

== Education and career ==
He studied philosophy, art history and pedagogy at the University of Zagreb and Osijek, Promotion in Düsseldorf (1999), Habilitation in Osnabruck (2006). 2003 – 2009 Junior Professor for Art History of the Modern Period at the University of Osnabruck (Germany). 2010 - 2011 Representation Professorship for Visual Studies and Media Theory at the University of Düsseldorf. From 2011 to 2019 Full Professor for Art History and Visual Culture at the University of Copenhagen, Denmark.

== Honors and awards ==
- DRUPA Prize for the best dissertation 2000 (1)
- Academia Europea, elected member since 2014

== Books (in German) ==
- Marcel Odenbach. Performance, Video, Installation 1975 – 1998, (1999)
- Dieter Kiessling. Closed-Circuit Video 1982 – 2000 (2001)
- Las Meninas transmedial. Painting. Catoptrics. Videofeedback“ (2001)
- Closed Circuit Video Installations. A Contribution to the History and Theory of Media Art (2004); Review in Sehepunkte (2006)
- Mirror. Medium. Art. On the History of Mirror in the Age of Image (2010).

Review in Süddeutsche Zeitung, 28.04.2011

- Marcel Odenbach. Performance, Video, Installation 1975 – 1998. München/Mainz 1999, ISBN 3-931876-24-1.
- Spiegel. Medium. Kunst. Zur Geschichte des Spiegels im Zeitalter des Bildes (2010), ISBN 978-3-7705-5007-4
- Differenz, Wiederholung und Infinitesimale Ästhetik. Matthias Neuenhofer. eva - edition video art #1. (2012), ISBN 978-3-8325-3077-8
- with Dawn Leach (eds): Image-Problem? Medienkunst und Performance im Kontext der Bilddiskussion (2007), ISBN 978-3-8325-1473-0.
- (ed): Theorien der Videokunst. Theoretikerinnen 1988–2003. eva - edition video art #3 (2018), ISBN 978-3-8325-4605-2.
- (ed): Theorien der Videokunst. Theoretikerinnen 2004–2018. eva - edition video art #4 (2018), ISBN 978-3-8325-4606-9.

== Books (in English) ==
- with Yvonne Spielmann (eds): Take it or leave it. Marcel Odenbach. An Anthology of Texts and Video Documents. eva - edition video art #2. Berlin 2013, ISBN 978-3-8325-3386-1
- Culture as Capital (2015), ISBN 978-3-8325-3899-6.
- with Hans Körner und Ellen Harlizius-Klück (eds): Framings. Berlin 2015, ISBN 978-3-8325-3386-1.
- Sabine Kacunko. Bacteria, Art and other Bagatelles. Vienna 2016, ISBN 978-3-903004-83-2.
- After Taste. Critique of Insufficient Reason. Berlin 2021, ISBN 978-3-00-069213-0.

Published articles include: M.A.D. Media Art Database(s)and the Challenges of Taste, Evaluation, and Appraisal; in: Leonardo Journal, Issue 42:3, June 2009.
