= Diana Cooper (artist) =

American visual artist (born 1964)

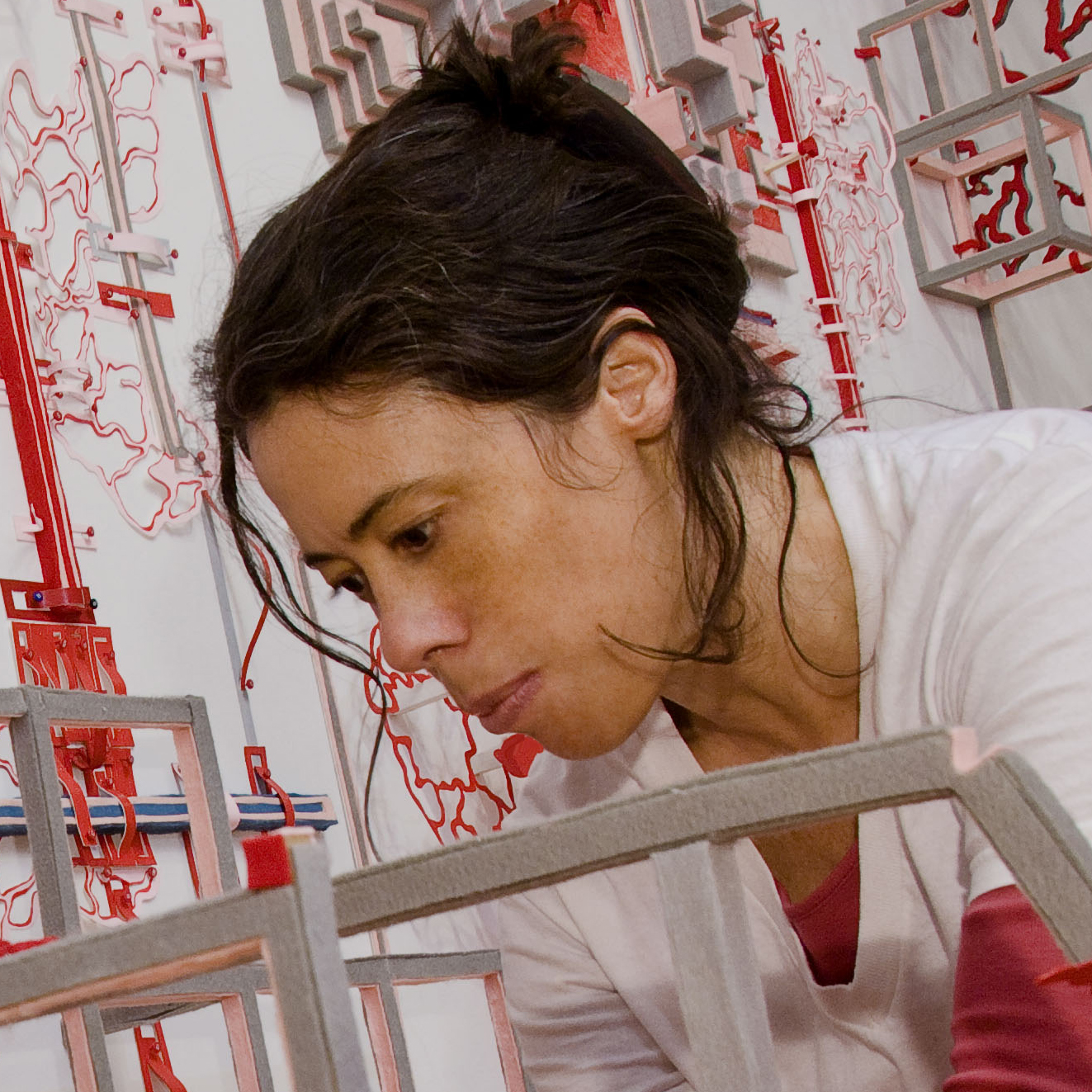
- Cooper installing "Emerger" at MOCA Cleveland, 2007
- Born: 1964 (age 61–62); Greenwich, Connecticut, U.S.
- Education: Hunter College, New York Studio School, Harvard University
- Known for: Installation art, sculpture, drawing, public art
- Spouse: Mark Lilla
- Awards: Guggenheim Fellowship, Rome Prize, Joan Mitchell Foundation, Pollock-Krasner Foundation, Anonymous Was A Woman
- Website: dianacooper.net

Diana Cooper, Orange Alert UK, acetate, acrylic, felt, neoprene, paper, foam core, corrugated plastic and map pins, dimensions variable, 2003–8. MOCA Cleveland/Postmasters Gallery.

Diana Cooper (born 1964) is an American visual artist, known for largely abstract, improvised hybrid constructions that combine drawing, painting, sculpture, installation and photography. Her art has evolved from canvas works centered on proliferating doodles to sprawling installations of multiplying elements and architectonic structures. Critics have described her earlier work—primarily made with craft supplies such as markers, pens, foamcore, pushpins, felt, pipe cleaners, tape and pompoms—as humble-looking yet labor-intensive, provisional and precarious, and "a high-wire act attempting to balance order and pandemonium." They note parallels to earlier abstract women artists such as Eva Hesse, Lee Bontecou, Elizabeth Murray, and Yayoi Kusama. Lilly Wei, however, identifies an "absurdist playfulness and Orwellian intimations" in Cooper's work that occupy a unique place in contemporary abstraction.

Cooper has received the Rome Prize, a Guggenheim Fellowship, and awards from the Anonymous Was A Woman, Pollock-Krasner and Joan Mitchell foundations. She has been commissioned to create public artworks for New York City and the Moss Arts Center at Virginia Tech, and her work has been acquired by the Museum of Fine Arts Boston, the British Museum and the Pinakothek der Moderne (Munich). Cooper is based in Brooklyn, New York and is married to the scholar and essayist Mark Lilla.

== Early life and career ==
Cooper was born in Greenwich, Connecticut in 1964 to Ian and Faith Cooper, who were both artists and teachers at private schools. She was drawn to dance and choreography in her youth, but turned to the visual arts while majoring in history and literature at Harvard University (BA, 1986). After graduating, she took courses at the New York Studio School, before earning an MFA in painting from Hunter College in 1997.

Cooper began exhibiting doodle-based works on canvas in the latter 1990s. She appeared in group shows at the New Museum and Knitting Factory and gained early notice for solo exhibitions at Ah! Space Gallery (1997) and Postmasters Gallery (1998) in New York. Since then, she has continued to exhibit at Postmasters, and in 2007 received a ten-year retrospective at the Museum of Contemporary Art Cleveland in 2007. She has also appeared in exhibitions at the Whitney Museum at Altria, MoMA PS1, The Drawing Room (London), SculptureCenter, Contemporary Arts Center (Cincinnati), Sharjah Art Museum (United Arab Emirates), and He Xiangning Art Museum (China), among others. Since 2008, Cooper has been an adjunct associate professor at Columbia University's School of the Arts.

== Work and reception ==
Cooper is known for her ability to extend two-dimensional sensibilities and geometries into three dimensional "hybrid constructions" and installations. She often relies on reduced color—keying works to one or two primary hues—and simple shapes as basic units, translating thoughts, experiences, emotions and information into abstract visual language. Her use of line, grid and form has been linked to artists such as Mondrian, the Constructivists, minimalists Donald Judd, Sol LeWitt and Tony Smith, and Peter Halley, but is more directly connected to accumulative artists such as Judy Pfaff, Jessica Stockholder and Sarah Sze. Critic David Cohen has distinguished her from the latter group, identifying a "divided sensibility" that maintains both a handmade, casually obsessive mode and a systematizing one committed to taxonomies of form and function. He wrote that all of her work—regardless of format or scale—remains in the orbit of drawing, poised between doodle and collage and operating "as a way of being in the world."

Diana Cooper, The Multicolor One, acrylic, felt tip markers, felt, acetate, paper, pipe cleaners, and pom poms on canvas, wall and floor, 87" x 107" x 37", 1997–8.

=== Canvases and wall reliefs ===
By the mid-1990s, Cooper abandoned painting in favor of a more personal form of expression involving expansive, Sharpie-marker doodles on canvas stapled to walls. In these works, tiny lines and circles (generally red, yellow, blue or black) accumulated to form dense networks, grids and mazes. The Black One (1997) is a representative work—a monochromatic canvas covered in black doodles, its surface embellished with metastasizing protrusions of pipe-cleaner chutes and ladders, pockets of pompoms, tape and construction netting. Reviews noted these labyrinthine designs for their graphic skill, sense of improvisation, and play of organic (cells), informational (maps, architectural plans) and technological (electrical circuitry, computer chips, bar codes, pixels) allusions. New York Times critic Ken Johnson wrote, "Cooper's additive process is not uncontrolled. Out of the tension between structures of order and containment and impulses of transgression and expansion, grows a ramshackle architecture or a kind of schematic model of the mind at play."

In later works, Cooper explored more varied and elaborate formats whose elements spilled off canvases onto walls and floors. Los Angeles Times critic Christopher Knight situated these wall reliefs (e.g., My Eye Travels, 2005) between self-contained drawings and "environmental deluge," likening them to visualizations of the ways computer viruses might work: "Havoc occurs through precise channels of organization, manic energy merges with exacting control and data seem to wobble between ferocious and benign. The structure of her art is a hybrid of machine regularity and human caprice."

Diana Cooper, Astral Lift, mixed media, inkjet prints, charcoal, spray paint, pencil and acrylic paint, 90" x 24" x 29", 2018–9.

=== Installations and sculptural works ===
In the 2000s, Cooper expanded her practice to include furniture-like sculptures and full installations that increasingly colonized their exhibition spaces. Speedway (2000–3) was a freestanding, De Stijl-styled foamcore structure, consisting on one side of a cutaway that Nancy Princenthal described as "a Las Vegas marquee of pulsing concentric and parallel lines, punctuated by seedily alluring little niches," and on the other, a dollhouse-like grid of cubbyholes, suggesting a Mondrian/Donald Judd-influenced "mini-museum." The mutating, increasingly elaborate installation Orange Alert UK (2003–8) employed taut linear arrangements of vivid reds, oranges and yellows, initially inspired by the color-coded, post-9/11 terrorist alert system, which formed cardiograph-like wall patterns and radiated from a central, spider-like form.

=== Photo-derived work ===
Digital photography and themes involving the built environment play a greater role in Cooper's later work, which has employed fewer elements and sometimes taken on a frieze-like appearance (e.g., the illusionistic wall-piece, Undercover, 2010–3). She uses photography to create sketchbook-like collections of abstract forms taken from everyday experience—details of airport tarmacs, subway seats, grass, refuse, construction fencing, or gallery architecture—which she re-presents out of context, revealing neglected qualities of beauty and strangeness or to create hyperreal spatial illusions (e.g., Skylight I, 2012–3). Jerry Saltz described her 2013 show, "My Eye Travels," as "a florid blaze of color, pattern, abstraction, and images of bits of the world," composed almost entirely of photographs "assembled into fragmenting mandalas of contemporary energy."

Several later exhibitions feature more self-contained pieces, sometimes working in relation to one another. The installation The Wall (2018) presented several dozen, disparate smaller works hung salon-style, which together functioned like a diaristic, graphic index of Cooper's concerns. "Sightings" (2019) consisted of more autonomous works and closed compositions that referenced and framed distinct, bound systems of urban structure, electronics and technology in order to encourage new ways of seeing (e.g., Slide Rule or Family Safe).

=== Public art commissions ===
Diana Cooper, Double Take, mosaic, ceramic, marble, granite and powder-coated aluminum, 2023. MTA Arts & Design Commission, Roosevelt Island, New York City.

Cooper has received three public art commissions. Her first was the permanent, site-specific work, Out of the Corner of My Eye (2008–9, commissioned by NYC Cultural Affairs Percent for Art) for the Jerome Parker Campus in Staten Island. Situated along a slow-curving, 107-foot-long wall in an Ennead Architects-designed building, the work employed more durable materials than past work—glass (inserted into pre-existing windows), fiberboard, metal hardware, and acrylic paint—and received an Americans for the Arts public art award.

For HighWire (2016, Moss Arts Center), Cooper developed her concept and imagery digitally, combining scans of her drawings with data visualization imagery alluding to micro- and macro- organic and technological systems. She printed the scans on PhotoTex—a repositionable adhesive material similar to that used in commercial signage—then hand-painted over them, reimagining the data as a lyrical, six-walled, 17-foot-tall, 116-foot-long landscape. In 2023, MTA Arts and Design unveiled Cooper's commissioned permanent public mural, Double Take, an 8-by-96-foot, glass mosaic, ceramic, granite and aluminum work located on Roosevelt Island. Her design marries geometric forms found in the location's ventilation building, the Queensboro Bridge and other surrounding structures with fluid hand-drawn and organic forms reflecting the natural setting and backdrop of the East River.

== Awards and public collections ==
Cooper has been recognized with a Guggenheim Fellowship (2000), an American Academy in Rome Prize (2003–4), and awards from Anonymous Was A Woman (2013), the Pollock-Krasner Foundation (2018, 2013, 2008), Joan Mitchell Foundation (2013), New York Foundation for the Arts (2013, 2000), Bogliasco Foundation (2011), and Marie Walsh Sharpe Foundation Space Program (2004–5). She has received artist residencies from the Atlantic Center for the Arts, Institute for Electronic Arts, La Cite Internationales des Arts (Paris), and Virginia Tech.

Her work belongs to the collections of public institutions including the British Museum, Cleveland Clinic, Herbert F. Johnson Museum of Art, Katzen Arts Center, Museum of Fine Arts Boston, New York Public Library, Pinakothek der Moderne and Progressive Art Collection, among others.
