= Nina Bovasso =

American artist

Nina Bovasso (born 1965) is an American artist.

Bovasso received a Guggenheim Memorial Fellowship in 2000. Her work is included in the collections of the Museum of Modern Art, New York, the Whitney Museum of American Art, and the Museum of Fine Arts Houston.
