= Ken Johnson (art critic) =

American art critic

Ken Johnson (born 1953 in Montclair, New Jersey) is an American artist and art critic who lives in New York City. Johnson was a writer for the arts pages of The New York Times until 2016, where he covered gallery and museum exhibits. Previously he wrote for Arts Magazine and Art in America. He is currently a painter, and exhibited a series of well-received paintings in April 2022 at Kerry Schluss Gallery in Manhattan.

Johnson attended Brown University and University at Albany, SUNY, earning a degree in art from the former in 1976 and a master's degree in studio art, with a concentration in painting, from the latter in 1977. In his journalism career he has written on contemporary art for several art magazines, newspapers and publications. He published for the Art Review in the New York Times, doing reviews for artists in NYC such as Don Doe. He was the art critic for the Boston Globe from 2006 to 2007.

He is also an educator, having taught courses in painting, drawing, electronic art, art history, and art criticism at various universities in upstate New York. He teaches a writing seminar in the School of Visual Arts in art criticism and writing in New York.

His book Are You Experienced? How psychedelic consciousness transformed modern art was published In June 2011.

== Criticism ==
In November 2012, Johnson's review of the Now Dig This exhibition at PS1 for the New York Times caused considerable controversy. It was considered to be charged with racist biases, consistent with his apparent dismissiveness of women and artists of color in numerous past reviews. In response, an online petition was launched, demanding that the paper acknowledge their editorial lapse in allowing such a text to be published in its current form, and to address the larger issues of race in contemporary art.
