= Djerassi Artists Residency =

Artists & writers residency in California

Djerassi Resident Artists Program
- Formation: 1979
- Type: 501(c)(3) nonprofit organization
- Purpose: to enhance the creativity of artists through the residency program and to preserve the land on which the program is situated
- Website: https://djerassi.org/

The Djerassi Artists Residency, also known as the Djerassi Resident Artists Program, is an artists and writers residency in San Mateo County, California, south of Woodside. The residency sits on a 583-acre former cattle ranch with a 12-sided barn converted into artist studios. Djerassi hosts 10 to 12 artists at a time for its month-long residencies, from March to November. The facilities include lodging with chef-prepared weekday dinners, living quarters, the Artists’ Barn (with multiple studios) and Old Barn (an installation and performance space). Djerassi is located in the Santa Cruz Mountains less than 40 miles south of San Francisco and overlooks the Pacific Ocean. Since Djerassi began, it has provided over 2,500 residencies to visual artists, composers, choreographers, media artists, writers and scientists from all 50 states and 54 countries. In addition, the Djerassi Hiking Program provides public access to the property and has expanded to include private hikes and specialty excursions, such as a five-hour walking meditation and sound immersion experience. An annual open house event allows visitors to explore the facilities, go on sculpture tours, meet the artists and enjoy performances. The residency has a dual mission: to enhance the creativity of artists and to preserve the land on which the program is situated.

== History ==
The program was co-founded in 1979 by Carl Djerassi, the inventor of the birth control pill, and Diane Middlebrook. The residency is competitive and held at no cost to the artists. Originally a women-only residency program in honor of Djerassi's artist daughter Pamela Djerassi Bush, lost to suicide at age 28 in 1978, the program later expanded to welcome all genders.
