= Deborah Kapchan =

American folklorist

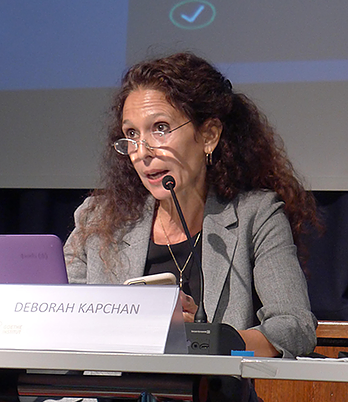
Deborah Kapchan

Deborah Kapchan is an American folklorist, writer, translator and ethnographer, specializing in North Africa and its diaspora in Europe. In 2000, Kapchan became a Guggenheim fellow. She has been a Fulbright-Hays recipient twice, and is a Fellow of the American Folklore Society. She is professor of Performance Studies at New York University, and the former director of the Center for Intercultural Studies in Folklore and Ethnomusicology (now the Américo Paredes Center for Cultural Studies) at the University of Texas at Austin.

== Biography ==
After completing her Bachelors of Arts in English Literature and French at New York University while studying flute performance with Harold Jones in New York, Kapchan went to Morocco in 1982 as a Peace Corps volunteer. There she learned Moroccan Arabic, and in 1984 got a job doing ethnography in Marrakech and in El Ksiba, Morocco, for a project on literacy run by Daniel Wagner. This experience reoriented her life and in 1985 she returned to the United States to do a Master's degree in linguistics at Ohio University. She then went on to pursue a Ph.D. in folklore and folklife from the University of Pennsylvania. working with Roger Abrahams. Her doctoral concentration was on the verbal art of Morocco and women's performances in the public sphere.

In 1992-93, she was a visiting professor at Indiana University's Department of Folklore and Ethnomusicology.

From 1993-2003 she was an assistant and associate professor of anthropology at the University of Texas at Austin, where she also directed The Center for Intercultural Studies in Folklore and Ethnomusicology (now the Américo Paredes Center for Cultural Studies) from 1996-2000.

In 2003 she was appointed to a position in the Department of Performance Studies at New York University, joining folklorist Barbara Kirshenblatt-Gimblett and the founder of Performance Studies, Richard Schechner.

== Selected publications ==
- Kapchan, Deborah. 2021. "The Aesthetics of Proximity and the Ethics of Empathy," Oxford Handbook of Phenomenology in Ethnomusicology. Harris Berger and Kati Szego, Eds. Oxford: Oxford University Press.
- Kapchan, Deborah. 2020. Poetic Justice: An Anthology of Moroccan Contemporary Poetry. University of Texas Press.
- Kapchan, Deborah. 2017. Theorizing Sound Writing. Deborah Kapchan, Editor. Music/Culture Series, Wesleyan University Press.
- Kapchan, Deborah. 2015. "The Body," In Matt Sakakeeny and David Novak, Eds. Keywords in Sound Durham: Duke University Press.
- Kapchan, Deborah. 2014. Intangible Heritage: Culture and Human Rights in Transit. Deborah Kapchan, Editor. Philadelphia: University of Pennsylvania Press.
- Kapchan, Deborah. 2012. "Reflecting on Encounters in Morocco: Meditations on Home, Genre, and the Performance of Everyday Life," In Moroccan Encounters, David Crawford and Rachel Newcomb, eds. Bloomington: Indiana University Press.
- Kapchan, Deborah. 2009. "Learning to Listen: The Sound of Sufism in France," The World of Music, special issue, Music for Being, edited by Helena Simonett. 51 (2): 65-90.
- Kapchan, Deborah. 2008. "The Promise of Sonic Translation: Performing the Festive Sacred in Morocco," American Anthropologist Vol 110 (4) : 467-483. [Reprinted in Frank Korom, editor, The Anthropology of Performance pp. 217–233. Wiley-Blackwell. Reprinted as well in Practicing Sufism: Sufi Politics and Performance in Africa, ed. Abdelmajid Hannoum. London: Routledge, 2016.]
- Kapchan, Deborah. 2007. Traveling Spirit Masters: Moroccan Trance Music in the Global Marketplace. Wesleyan University Press, Music/Culture Series.
- Kapchan, Deborah. 2002. "Translating Folk Theories of Translation," In, Translating Culture, edited by Paula Rubel and Abraham Rosman. Berg Publishers.
- Kapchan, Deborah. 1999. "Theorizing the Hybrid," special issue of Journal of American Folklore. Kapchan, Deborah, and Pauline Turner Strong, eds.
- Kapchan, Deborah. 1996. Gender on the Market: Moroccan Women and the Revoicing of Tradition. Philadelphia: University of Pennsylvania Press
