= Trans Bay Cable =

HVDC line between Pittsburg, CA and San Francisco

- Map of Trans Bay Cable

Location
- Country: United States
- State: California
- Coordinates: 38.0171°N 121.8513°W (original Pittsburg converter site); 38.0307°N 121.8966°W (final Pittsburg converter site); 37.7547°N 122.3846°W (Potrero converter site)
- From: Pittsburg
- Passes through: San Francisco Bay, San Pablo Bay, Suisun Bay
- To: San Francisco

Ownership information
- Owner: City of Pittsburg
- Operator: Trans Bay Cable LLC (a subsidiary of NextEra Energy Transmission)

Construction information
- Cable manufacturer: Prysmian Group
- Contractors: Cupertino Electric
- Construction started: December 15, 2007
- Commissioned: November 23, 2010

Technical information
- Type: high-voltage direct current (HVDC) submarine
- Current type: DC
- Total length: 53 mi (85 km)
- Capacity: 400 MW
- DC voltage: ±200 kV
- Website: www.transbaycable.com

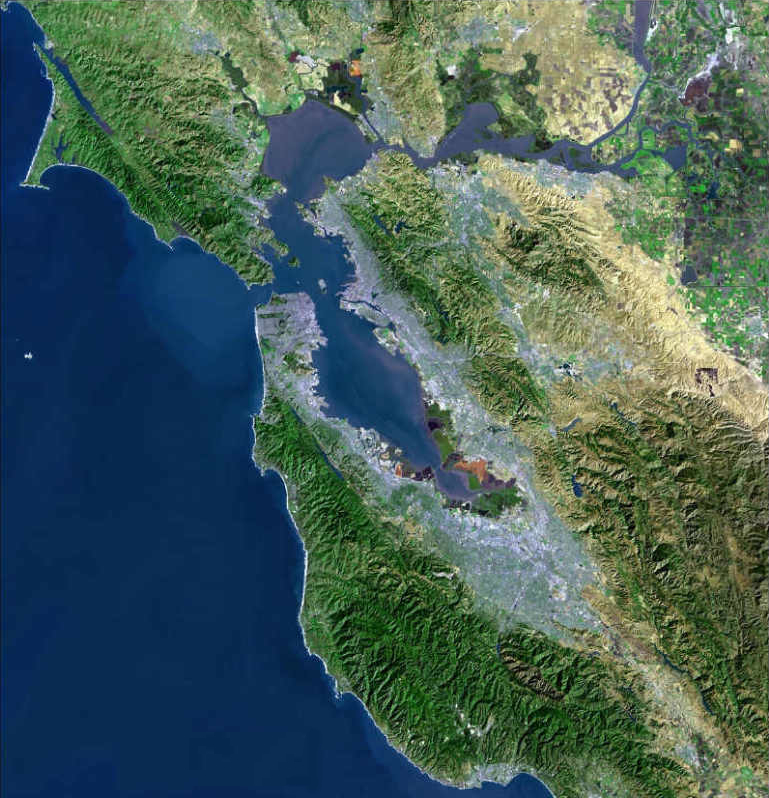

The Trans Bay Cable is a high-voltage direct current (HVDC) underwater transmission cable interconnection between San Francisco, California and Pittsburg, California. The 53 mi (85 km) cable under San Francisco Bay and through the Carquinez Strait can transmit 400 megawatts of power at a DC voltage of ±200 kV, enough to provide 40% of San Francisco's peak power needs.

The line connects PG&E's Potrero Substation (formerly the switchyard for Potrero Generating Station) to its 230 kV transmission line in Pittsburg. The system was completed in November 2010. The Trans Bay Cable project was the first HVDC system to use the Modular Multi-Level Converter (MMC) system.

== History ==
=== 1998 San Francisco power outage ===
Until recently, San Francisco had two power plants within city limits to support local demand: Hunters Point Power Plant (shut down in 2006) and Potrero Generating Station (shut down in 2011); the remaining electric load for the city is supplied through the grid. Located at the northern tip of San Francisco Peninsula, the city was connected to the rest of California's grid through a single transmission path, including the San Mateo Substation near Coyote Point Recreation Area. On December 8, 1998, a disturbance at that substation tripped it offline; the resulting chain reaction also would knock the transmission lines out of service and shut down both Hunters Point and Potrero electric generating stations, causing a power outage covering most of the city for eight hours.

=== Reliability initiatives ===
Following the prolonged outage, the utility (Pacific Gas and Electric), the City and County of San Francisco, and the California Public Utilities Commission formed the San Francisco Stakeholder Study Group (SFSSG) to determine immediate transmission solutions to ensure electric reliability, which led to the upgrading of PG&E transmission lines and towers paralleling Interstate 280 under the Jefferson-Martin transmission line project to diversify the path. After the Jefferson-Martin project was complete, PG&E decommissioned Hunters Point in 2006.

Key sites of Trans Bay Cable, which runs west from Pittsburg through Suisun and San Pablo Bays, then south through San Francisco Bay to San Francisco
1 Pittsburg converter site
2 Potrero converter site

The SFSSG also studied projects to enhance long-term reliability, which included an evaluation of several proposals for transmission lines across San Francisco Bay. In September 2005, the California Independent System Operator (CAISO) identified the Trans Bay Cable (TBC) project as the preferred option over alternatives from PG&E, which had proposed building AC lines to Potrero from East Bay substations in Moraga or Fremont. The capital costs of the alternatives were approximately equal, but the HVDC technology proposed for the TBC project would have reduced transmission losses. The submarine route also avoided siting concerns for high-voltage overhead transmission lines and towers in residential neighborhoods; in addition, adding the new transmission line could obviate the need to build peaking power plants within city limits, including the removal of the Potrero Generating Station.

Babcock & Brown (B&B) executed a development agreement with the City of Pittsburg in January 2004, and introduced the project to CAISO in February. The original intent was for B&B to develop the cable project and finance it, then transfer ownership to the city's municipal utility (Pittsburg Power) and convey transmission rights to CAISO. The San Francisco Board of Supervisors voted 9–2 to approve the TBC project in August 2007 and the final discretionary permit was granted by the San Francisco Bay Conservation and Development Commission on August 16, 2007.

=== Construction ===
Construction on the TBC officially began on December 15, 2007. A joint venture between Siemens Energy and Prysmian Construction Services (formerly Pirelli Cable) were responsible for building the turnkey project; the Siemens/Prysmian joint venture subcontracted electrical equipment installation to Cupertino Electric. After B&B declared bankruptcy in 2009, the management of B&B partnered with John Hancock Life Insurance Company, creating SteelRiver Infrastructure Partners to complete the cable.

Cable laying operations began on October 11, 2009 using the cable vessel Giulio Verne and the barge Manson 73 for the shallower eastern approaches. The starting point for both vessels was just west of the Benicia–Martinez Bridge. By November 6, Giulio Verne had laid cable to the north side of the San Francisco–Oakland Bay Bridge and Manson 73 had completed its 24 km (15 mi) segment to Pittsburg; a total of 78 kilometres (48 mi) of cable had been placed. Another Manson Construction Company barge, Hagar, was used to perform post-lay burial activities, including placing flexible concrete mats for protection. The cable was laid, buried, and connected at each end by December 3, 2009, and a preliminary test was conducted on January 15, 2010, successfully transmitting 400 MW to the San Francisco grid. However, during subsequent testing, the converter modules failed at a higher than expected rate. Final testing was completed on November 3, 2010, with substantial completion declared a week later; the Trans Bay Cable entered revenue service on November 23. After the Trans Bay Cable was completed, Potrero (then owned by Mirant) was decommissioned in 2011.

TBC was damaged in September 2014 after MV Ocean Life dropped anchor after losing power near the Benicia–Martinez bridge; repairs took four months to complete. In 2018, Siemens upgraded the control system, allowing black start capability, which enables the TBC to support critical infrastructure needs in San Francisco as the sole source of power, without relying on the local grid. Under black start conditions, up to 300 MW electric can be supplied through the TBC; normally, the TBC can transmit up to 400 MW, which is approximately 40% of the total load for San Francisco under peak demand. SteelRiver sold its interest in the cable to NextEra Energy Transmission in July 2019 for a reported $1 billion.

== Design ==
In the original plan, there were five major components in the Trans Bay Cable project:

1. 57 miles (92 km) of submarine and underground HVDC cable bundle
2. New 5.4-acre (2.2 ha) converter station in Pittsburg, converting AC grid power to DC
3. New 6.8-acre (2.8 ha) converter station in San Francisco, converting DC to AC
4. 5.5 miles (8.9 km) of single-circuit 3-phase 230 kV AC lines connecting converter station with PG&E substation in Pittsburg
5. 0.3 miles (0.48 km) of double-circuit 3-phase 115 kV AC lines connecting converter station with PG&E substation in San Francisco

The original design for the HVDC cable bundle included a 400 kV transmission line (approximately 4.5 in (114 mm) in diameter), a 12 kV metallic return (ground) cable (3.4 in (86 mm) diameter), and a fiber optic communication cable (1 inch (25 mm) diameter); the total bundle was 10 in (250 mm) in diameter. With the adoption of HVDC Power Link Universal System (PLUS) technology, two cables of identical size were used instead for the transmission line, along with the fiber optic cable. Each cable is energized to 200 kV (one positive, one negative). The HVDC converter for HVDC PLUS uses a half-bridge topology; the system is rated to carry up to 400 MW of electric power in a symmetrical monopole configuration.

Prysmian Group manufactured the HVDC and terrestrial AC cables in its Arco Felice (Naples) factory and laid the submarine HVDC cable using its own ship, the Giulio Verne (IMO number: 8302014).

Each converter station consists of a valve hall originally designed to be 64 feet (20 m) high, a DC hall, and a control building; the total area for the buildings is 23,000 square feet (2,100 m^{2}); in addition, a switchyard will handle the connection to the existing grid after conversion. With the update to HVDC PLUS, the building height and size were reduced: height was reduced to 35 feet (11 m) and the required footprint is reduced by approximately 25 percent.

The original route for the AC lines connecting the Pittsburg substation with the converter site (near the Delta Energy Center) were mainly underwater, running approximately north from the substation, east around the northern end of Browns Island, southeast along the slough between Browns and Winter islands, east to the southern tip of Winter Island, then south and back on land to the converter site. However, the Pittsburg converter station later was moved to a site near West Tenth Street, just south of the existing PG&E substation, reducing the AC interconnect lines to less than 1 mile (1.6 km) and shortening the HVDC cable bundle to 53 miles (85 km). The San Francisco converter station is near the intersection of 23rd and Illinois, between Piers 70 and 80.

The submarine HVDC cable is buried at a depth of 3 to 6 feet (0.91 to 1.83 m) below the floor of the Bay to protect it from anchor strikes. In certain locations, such as where the cable crosses existing utilities, it is unable to be buried, and flexible concrete mats were placed atop the cable for protection.
