= Heat emission =

Heat emission may refer to:

- Climate change
- Heat transfer
- Thermal radiation
- Thermal pollution
