= India Basin, San Francisco =

Neighborhood in California

India Basin
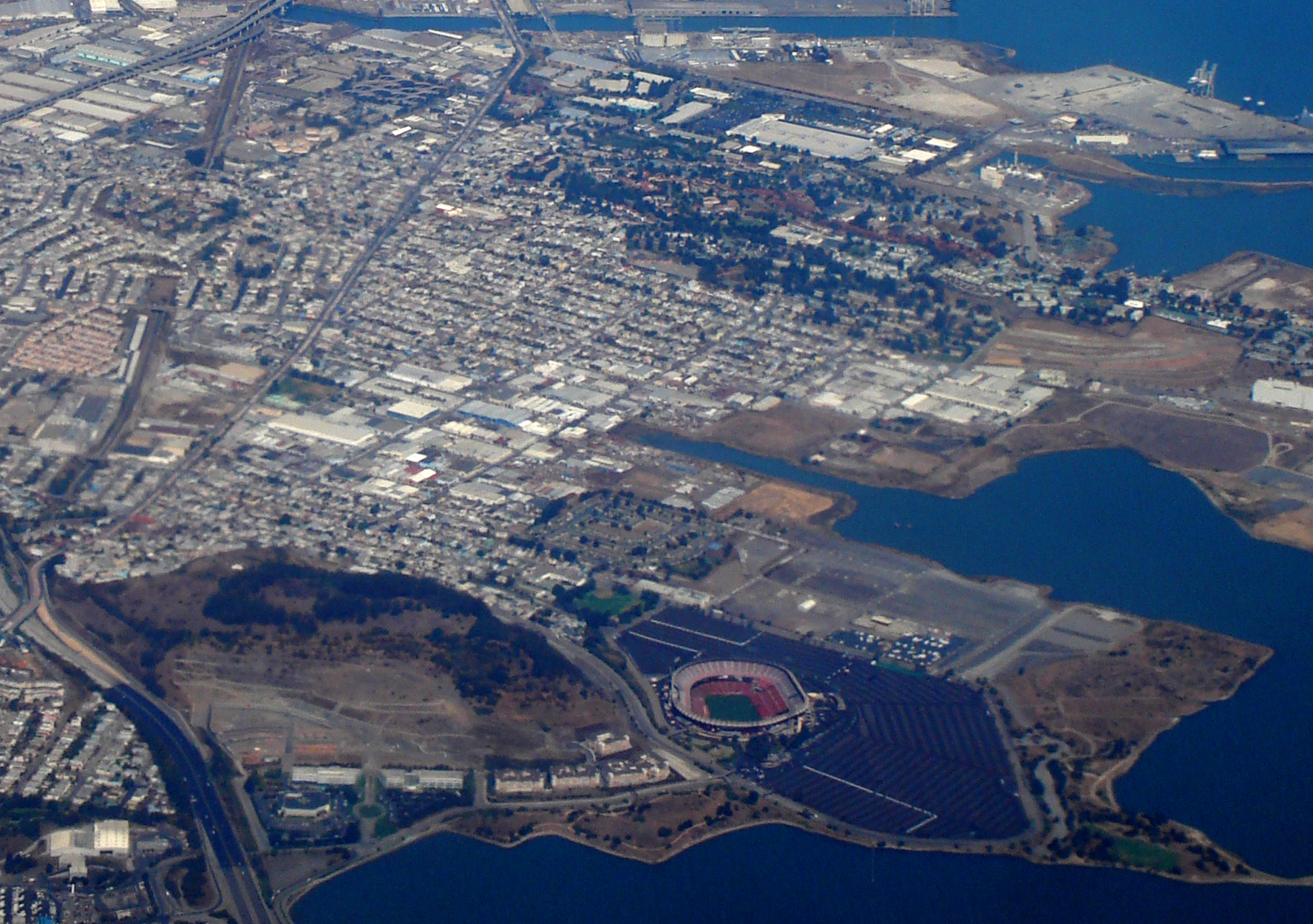
- Aerial view of the Bayview-Hunters Point and India Basin neighborhoods of San Francisco from 2007. India Basin is at the upper right of the photograph, west of the second farthest body of water, just south of Islais Creek and Piers 90–96 of the Port of San Francisco. The largest building in the India Basin Industrial Park is a major mail sorting facility for the United States Postal Service.
- Interactive map of India Basin
- Coordinates: 37.7407°N 122.3822°W

India Basin is a neighborhood, named after the body of water, in the southeastern part of San Francisco, California, considered to be part of the larger Bayview–Hunters Point neighborhood.

== History ==
The history of India Basin is a curious combination of industry and open space, business and pleasure. The area was part of a larger 4,446-acre (1,799 ha) rancho granted to José Cornelio Bernal in 1839, named Rancho Rincon de las Salinas y Potrero Viejo. Bernal sold the land that would become India Basin to two developers in the late 1840s, Dr. John Townsend and Corneille de Boom, but the venture was not successful. Other records indicate that Bernal sold 160 acres (65 ha) to John Hunter in 1849 or 1850 for a new town he was planning to be named South San Francisco, not to be confused with South San Francisco, the city incorporated in 1908 in San Mateo County. The neighborhood was difficult to access from central San Francisco until the completion of the "Long Bridge" in 1865, a wooden causeway built over Mission Cove along the line of Kentucky Street (now Third Street), then extended to Hunters Point in 1867.

The name India Basin was first given in 1868 by the State Board of Tide Land Commissioners, defined as the area between the mouth of Islais Creek and the eastern end of Hunters Point. Theories as to its origin remain murky. The best guess is that India Basin is named for the ships from the India Rice Mill Company, which docked there in the 19th century. A more creative explanation has it that it was so named because water from nearby springs would stay fresh until a ship reached India.

The area also was known initially as Butchertown for the numerous slaughterhouses, tanneries, and animal processing facilities that were the first industries established in the area. In 1868, a group of butchers purchased an 81-acre (33 ha) parcel as a "Butcher's Reservation" in the Bayview neighborhood; by 1877, the last ranch and butcher near the city center was being removed to the new reservation. At the time, the area was marshy and relatively isolated, facilitating the disposal of offal; the new slaughterhouses generally were built with slatted floors above areas where waste could be swept away by the twice-daily bay tides. Contemporary coverage indicates this did not occur as intended, describing water "black with decomposed blood, [bearing] on its surface masses of foul straw, stable ordure and floating offal" with a smell that reportedly caused a traveler to return on the Oakland ferry without bothering to disembark.

The southern part of India Basin (centered along 9th Avenue South, now Innes) also was used by small boat builders, starting in approximately 1870, drawn from Islais Creek and Potrero Point by inexpensive land and deep Bay water access. Plans were prepared after the 1906 San Francisco earthquake to build houses on land to be reclaimed from the Bay by fill, but voters in Los Angeles defeated the proposed bond which would have funded a seawall. Fill was added to reclaim land between India Basin and Islais Creek starting in the early 1960s, north of what is now Cargo Way. First, a debris dike was constructed in 1961, then 2,500,000 cu yd (1,900,000 m^{3}) of Bay mud dredged from the Army Street Terminal was placed within the perimeter of the dike in 1964. The site continued to be used as a landfill between 1965 and 1975, and a soil cap was placed in 1977. In 1969, the Port of San Francisco voted unanimously to approve plans to construct a new 50-acre (20 ha) lighter aboard ship (LASH) terminal for Pacific Far East Lines on the new fill. The LASH terminal was the world's first and opened in 1972.

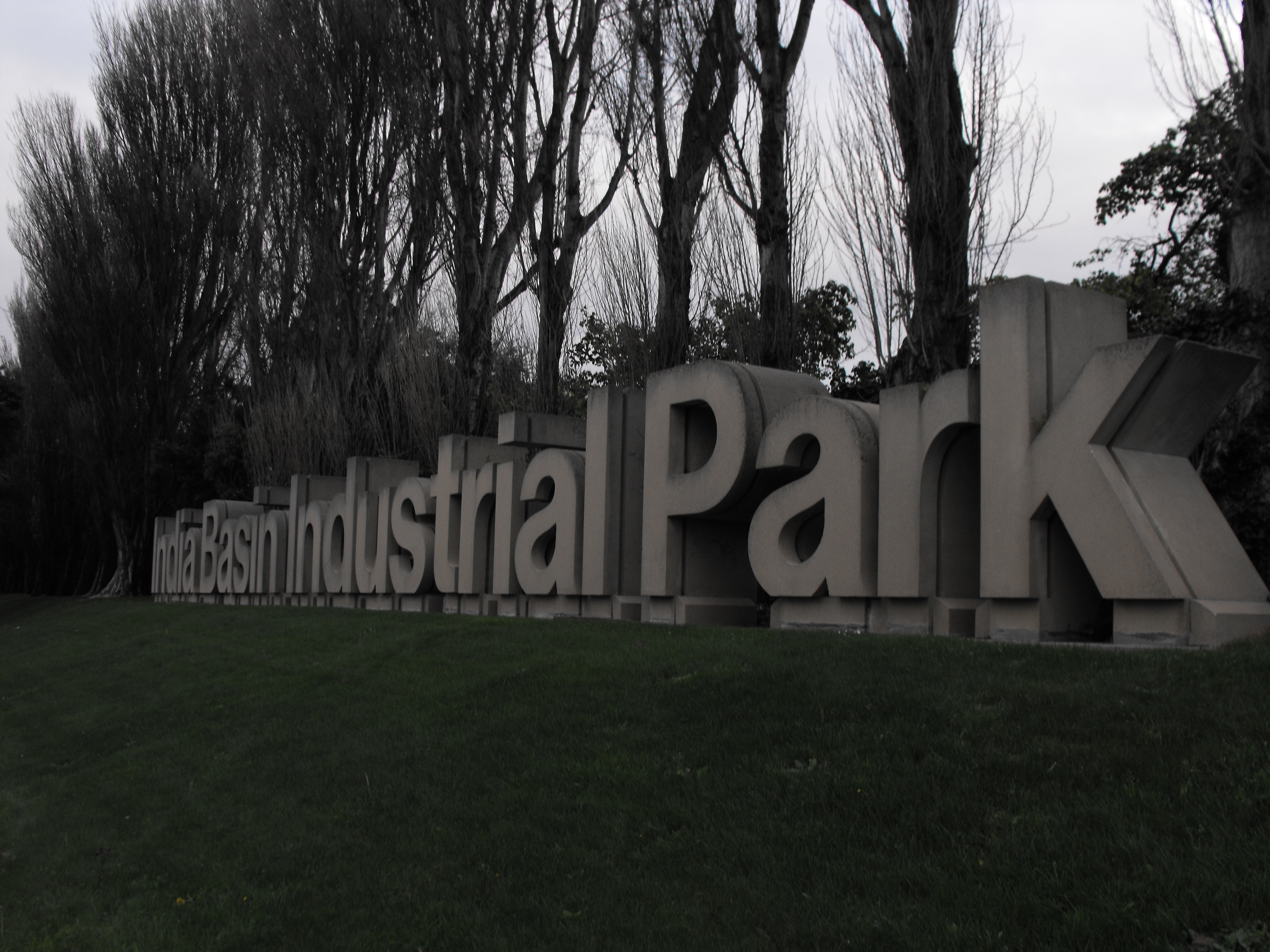
This sign for the India Basin Industrial Park (designed around 1978 by noted local graphic artist Michael Manwaring) was on Third Street, just north of the intersection with Evans and east of the Evans station. The letters were removed in 2020 as part of a redevelopment project.

The Butchertown Redevelopment Plan was developed in the late 1960s by the San Francisco Redevelopment Agency to combat "severe conditions of blight" and proposed to rezone the area for industrial uses. By 1975, more than $22 million had been spent to remove and bulldoze the remaining slaughterhouses and automotive wrecking yards in the area, but none of the new lots had been sold, and backers began to market the site to the United States Postal Service (USPS). Eventually, the USPS moved the San Francisco Processing and Distribution Facility from Rincon Annex to India Basin by 1979, occupying nearly half the available land.

The area has a strong community and many people are members of the India Basin Neighborhood Association (IBNA).

== Location ==
Selected locations in India Basin, San Francisco
- Points of interest
- Parks and open spaces
1 Port of San Francisco, Piers 90–96 (incl. 'Backlands')
2 India Basin Industrial Park (Butchertown Redevelopment Area)
3 Heron's Head Park
4 Youngblood-Coleman Playground
5 Hunters Point Power Plant
6 India Basin Shoreline Park
7 900 Innes
8 700 Innes / The Big Green
9 Northside Park

As initially defined, India Basin referred to the part of San Francisco Bay between the Hunters Point peninsula and Islais Creek. The definition was expanded later to encompass the neighborhood north of Ninth Avenue South (now Innes Avenue), bounded by Kentucky (now Third) Street and the Hunters Point Naval Shipyard, extending from the top of the hill to the water. It is just north of the Bayview neighborhood, and south of the Pier 90–96 cargo terminal, which includes the LASH shipping facility built originally by the Port of San Francisco for Pacific Far East Lines. There is an undeveloped area within Piers 90–96 which the Port calls the Pier 90–94 Backlands.

The Butchertown/India Basin neighborhood was absorbed into Bayview–Hunters Point in approximately 1938, prior to World War II, when the United States Navy took over the Bethlehem Steel Hunters Point Dry Docks. On December 27, 1965, the San Francisco Board of Supervisors adopted Resolution No. 835-65, which defined the Butchertown Survey Area as the area bounded by Arthur Avenue (now Cargo Way) on the north, Third Street (on the west), Jennings Street (on the east), and an irregular route following Innes, Hudson, Galvez, Fairfax, and Evans Avenues (on the south).

== Parks ==
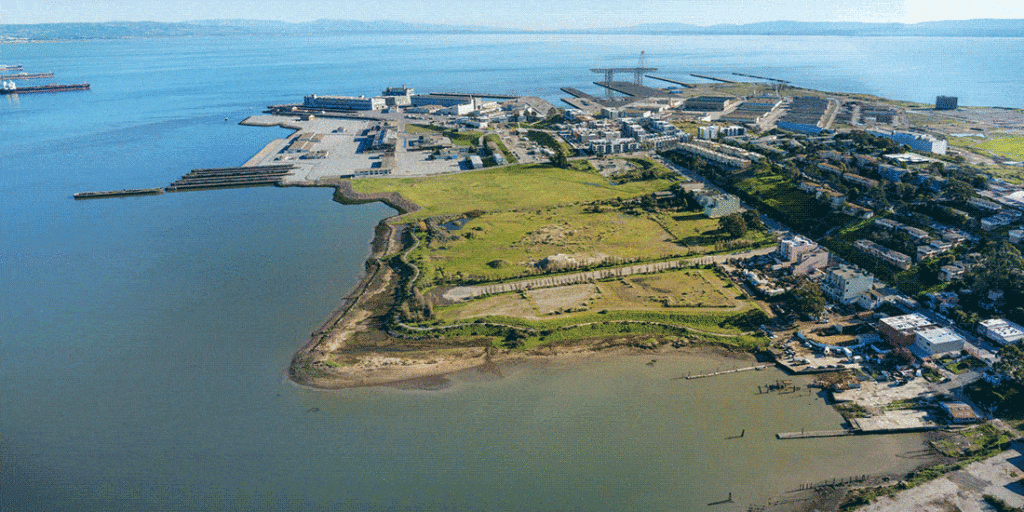
The foreground of this image of the Hunters Point Peninsula, facing southeast, shows the area proposed to expand the India Basin Open Space parks, including 700 Innes, The Big Green, and Northside Park

Parks in the India Basin neighborhood and shoreline include Heron's Head Park, Youngblood-Coleman Playground, and India Basin Shoreline Park. Undeveloped areas considered for parks include the Hunters Point shoreline area, where the Hunters Point Power Plant once stood; 900 Innes, adjacent to India Basin Shoreline Park; India Basin Open Space / The Big Green / 700 Innes, an undeveloped area bounded roughly by Innes, Donahue, and the Bay; and Northside Park, an area between 700 Innes and Hunters Point.

The India Basin Shoreline Park (India Basin) Natural Area is located adjacent to Hunters Point Boulevard in San Francisco, at the shore of San Francisco Bay. India Basin is the only Natural Area within the San Francisco Recreation and Park Department (SFRPD) system that borders on San Francisco Bay. The natural area, located in the park's southern section, comprises approximately 6.2 acres (25,000 m^{2}) of the entire 11.8 acres (48,000 m^{2}) park. Only the southern third of the entire park is considered a Natural Area.

As the only Natural Area adjacent to the Bay, India Basin has high unique natural resource and recreational values that include: recreational trail use on a segment of the Bay Trail; shoreline access to the Bay for fishing, kayaking and other water-dependent recreation; one of only a few tidal salt marsh wetlands in the City; suitable habitat for a variety of shore birds and foraging habitat for raptors; and views of the San Francisco Bay.

In 2016, the San Francisco Parks Alliance and Build Inc. sponsored a competition for a public 7.5-acre park on the India Basin Shoreline. Seattle-based landscape architecture firm GGN (Gustafson Guthrie Nichol) won the competition, focusing their proposal on a softened shoreline and connections to the existing neighborhood. With an emphasis on access, recreation, and habitat, the park is designed to "be an extension of the local culture and today's patterns of living."
