= 23rd Street station (Muni Metro) =

Muni Metro light rail stop in San Francisco

23rd Street
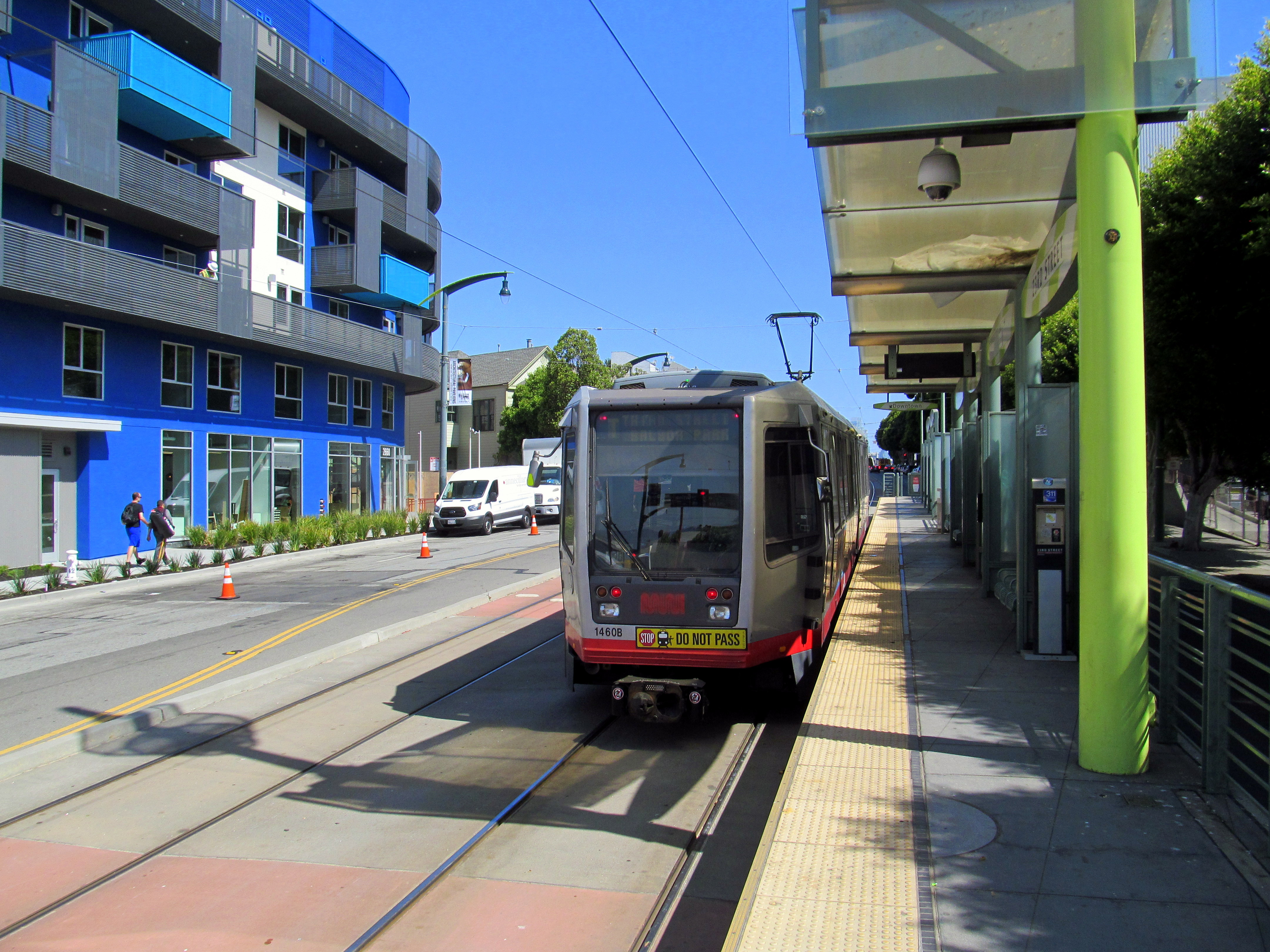
- A northbound train at 23rd Street station in July 2017

General information
- Location: Third Street at 23rd Street; San Francisco, California
- Coordinates: 37°45′21″N 122°23′18″W
- Platforms: 1 island platform, 2 side platforms
- Tracks: 2
- Connections: Caltrain (at 22nd Street)

Construction
- Accessible: Yes

History
- Opened: January 13, 2007

Services
Preceding station	Muni	Following station
20th Street toward Chinatown	T Third Street	Marin Street toward Sunnydale
Location

23rd Street station is a light rail station on the Muni Metro T Third Street line, located in the median of Third Street in the Dogpatch neighborhood of San Francisco, California. The station opened with the T Third Street line on January 13, 2007. It has two side platforms; the northbound platform is north of 23rd Street, and the southbound platform south of 23rd Street, so that trains can pass through the intersection before the station stop.

Caltrain's 22nd Street station is located about 0.4 miles (0.64 km) away from this station, offering an indirect connection. The station is served by the T Bus and 91 Owl bus routes, which provide service along the T Third Street line during the early morning and late night hours respectively when trains do not operate.
