= Marin Street station =

Light rail station in San Francisco

Marin Street
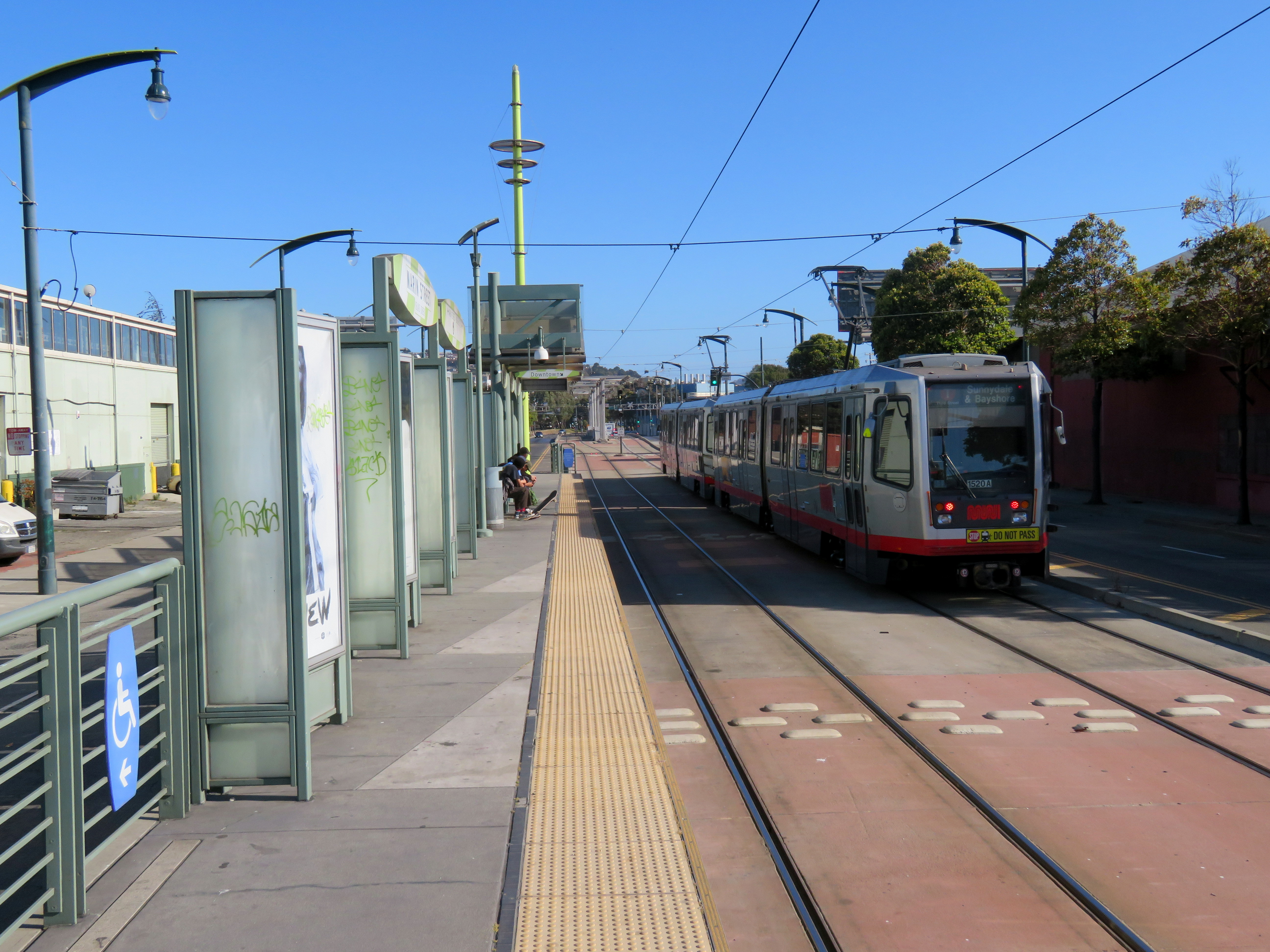
- A southbound train passing the northbound platform in June 2018

General information
- Other names: Islais Creek
- Location: Third Street at Marin Street; San Francisco, California
- Coordinates: 37°44′56.37″N 122°23′14.78″W
- Platforms: 2 side platforms
- Tracks: 2
- Connections: Muni: 15

Construction
- Cycle facilities: Bay Wheels station
- Accessible: Yes

History
- Opened: April 7, 2007

Services
Preceding station	Muni	Following station
23rd Street toward Chinatown	T Third Street	Evans toward Sunnydale
Location

Marin Street station (also signed as Islais Creek) is a light rail station on the Muni Metro T Third Street line, located in the median of 3rd Street one block south of Cesar Chavez Street in the Bayview neighborhood of San Francisco, California. The station opened with the T Third Street line on April 7, 2007. It has two side platforms; the northbound platform is south of Marin Street, and the southbound platform is north of it.

The station is also served by bus route 15 plus the T Bus and 91 Owl bus routes, which provide service along the T Third Street line during the early morning and late night hours respectively when trains do not operate.
