= 19 Polk =

Bus route in San Francisco, California

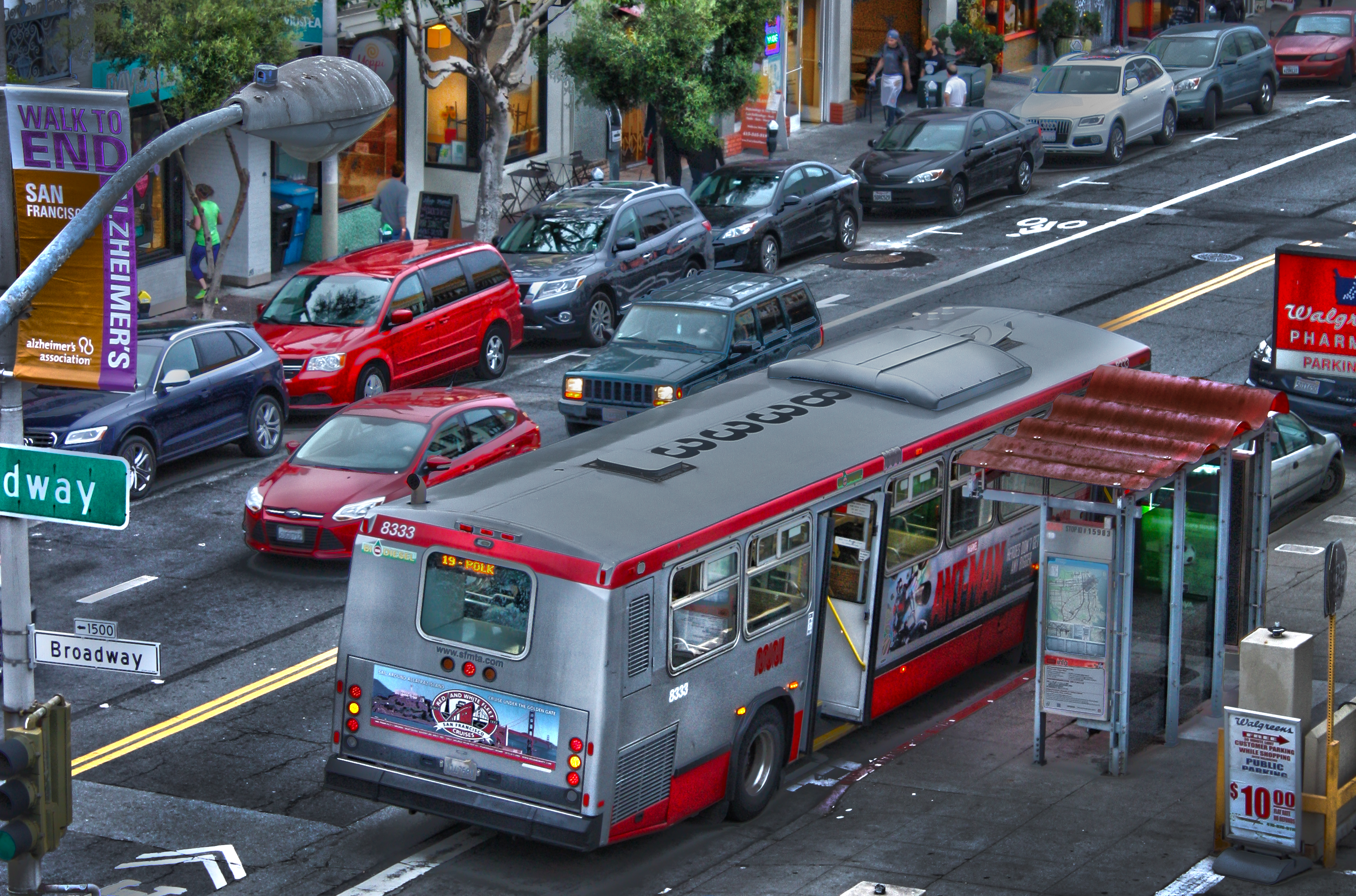
- A Muni 19 bus at Polk and Broadway in 2015

Overview
- System: San Francisco Municipal Railway
- Operator: San Francisco Municipal Railway
- Vehicle: New Flyer XDE40
- Began service: 1883

Route
- Locale: San Francisco, California
- Start: Galvez Ave & Robinson Ave
- End: Beach St & Polk St
- Length: 7.8 miles (12.6 km)
- Daily ridership: 6,900 (2019)
- Map: 19 Polk Map

19 Polk is a bus route operated by the San Francisco Municipal Railway (Muni). It runs from Ghirardelli Square in the north to Hunters Point in the south via Russian Hill, Nob Hill, the Tenderloin, South of Market, India Basin, and Potrero Hill.

== Route ==
The northern end of the line operates on Polk Street, turning around Ghirardelli Square for return trips. The southern end begins at Galvez Avenue and Hill Drive, running inbound via Galvez, Donnahue, Innes, Hunters Point Boulevard, Evans, and Cesar Chavez. Northbound and southbound buses run on a largely different route in their middle sections. Southbound buses continue on Polk past Geary to their route on Eddy, Hyde, 8th, Division, Rhode Island, 26th, Wisconsin, 25th, Connecticut, then on to the southern routing at Cesar Chavez. Northbound trips run on Connecticut, Wisconsin, 26th, Kansas, 23rd, De Haro, 16th, Rhode Island, Division, Townsend, 7th, Market, Hayes, Larkin, and Geary to meet up on Polk.

== History ==
Sutter Street Railway established cable car service on Polk Street between Post and Pacific in 1883. The tracks were 5-foot gauge running between 9th and Brannan to Pacific and Divisadero. The line was largely rebuilt as standard gauge and electric traction following the 1906 San Francisco earthquake. It was extended to North Point in 1915 in order to serve the Panama–Pacific International Exposition. Streetcar service was initially abandoned in June 1939 to save money on two-man operation, but rush hour service was reinstated with one-man cars in 1940. After high demand for service during World War II fell off, all trips were replaced with buses after September 29, 1945. (Tracks remained in place until at least 1948.)

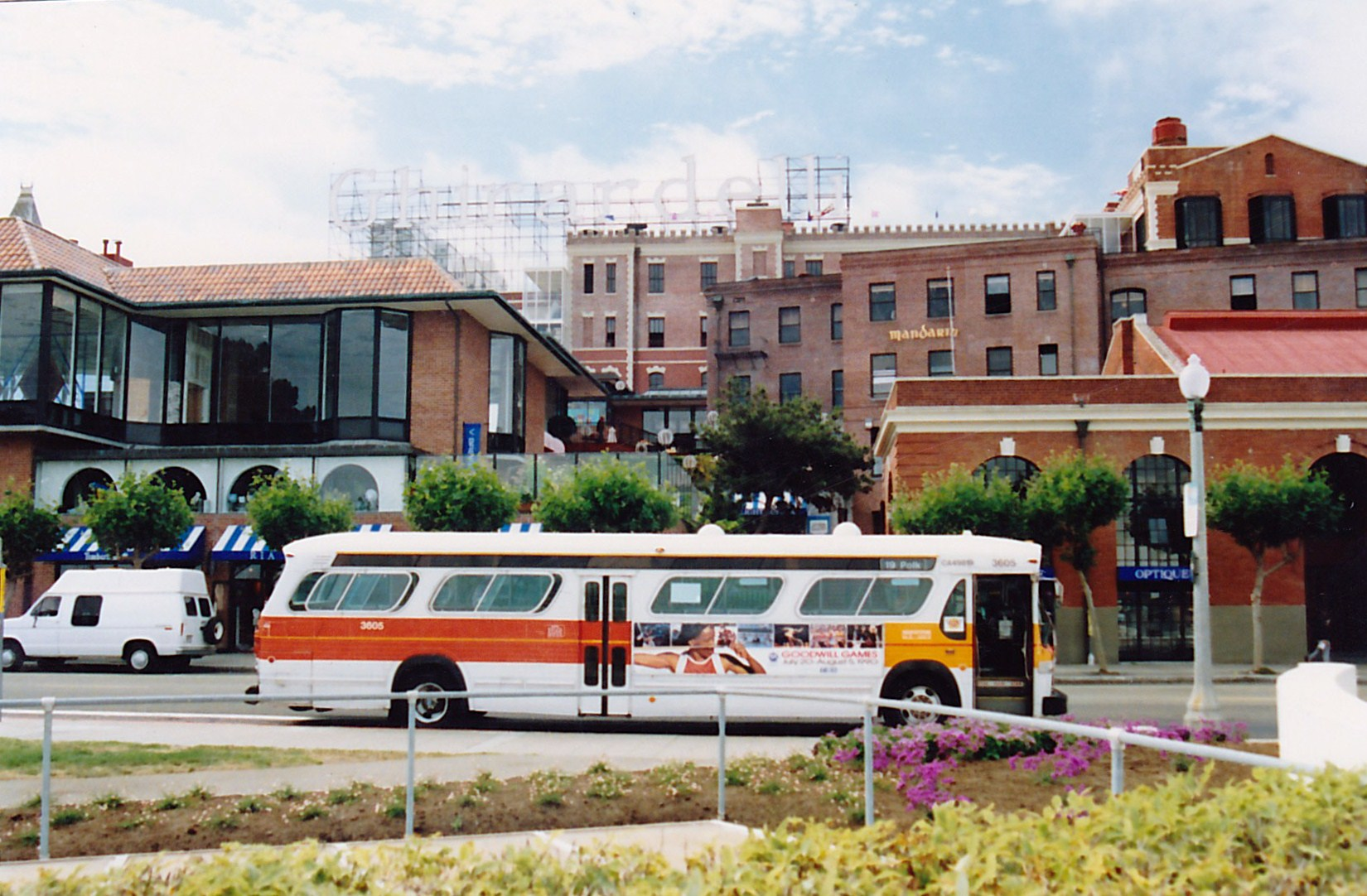
19 Polk bus at Ghirardelli Square, 1990

An extension of the line south on Rhode Island and 23rd to Potrero Hill began in November 1969 on a trial basis. The 87X Civic Center Express operated over the 19 Polk route between 4th and King Street station and the Civic Center for eleven months starting in July 1979. The extension to India Basin began on September 10, 1980 as part of Muni's 5-Year Plan which was then being implemented. This ended the line's service to the Southern Pacific depot.
