= Hunters Point Power Plant =

Power plant in San Francisco, California, US

- Hunters Point Power Plant (final configuration, after 1958 addition of Unit 4), viewed southwest from dike. R-L: Unit 1 (lowest building with arched windows), Units 2/3 (open building with peaked roof), Unit 4 (open building with flat square roof)
- Country: United States
- Location: 1000 Evans Ave; San Francisco, California
- Coordinates: 37.7374°N 122.3763°W
- Status: Decommissioned
- Construction began: September 1928
- Commission date: December 3, 1929
- Decommission date: May 15, 2006
- Owners: Pacific Gas & Electric (PG&E)
- Operators: PG&E
- Site area: 38 acres (15 ha)
- Cooling source: once-through (San Francisco Bay)

Power generation
- Units decommissioned: 4
- Nameplate capacity: 450 MW

The Hunters Point Power Plant (HPPP) was a fossil fuel-fired power plant in the India Basin neighborhood of the Bayview-Hunters Point area covering southeastern San Francisco, California, operated by Pacific Gas and Electric Company (PG&E) from 1929 to 2006. After HPPP shut down, the last electric power plant in San Francisco was the Potrero Generating Station, which subsequently shut down in 2011.

== History ==
The site which would be occupied by the Hunters Point Power Plant was first used to build ships and barges in the early 1900s; it is bounded approximately by Jennings (to the northwest), Pier 96 (to the northeast), Evans (on the southwest), and San Francisco Bay / India Basin (on the southeast), although there were numerous fuel storage tanks near the intersection of Jennings and Evans, outside these nominal site boundaries.

=== Construction and expansion ===
The first unit used a steam turbine drawing from a fuel oil-fired boiler; it was built in 1928–29 by the Great Western Power Company. Great Western Power advertised a construction contract in September 1928 for US$150,000 (equivalent to $2,810,000 in 2025) to build the foundations for an electric generating plant "between Evans, Jennings and Burke avenues, India and Hawes streets". By December, a "new building near Hunter's [sic] Point" was being built for Great Western Power, as mentioned in a news article, the contract for the building was advertised at US$630,000 (equivalent to $11,810,000 in 2025) in March 1929. The total cost of the San Francisco Bay Steam Plant, scheduled for completion in summer 1929, was US$3,500,000 (equivalent to $65,600,000 in 2025); as completed, the plant had a capacity of 35 MW electric power and plans were being prepared to expand generation to 170 MW. PG&E purchased the plant from Great Western Power on June 1, 1929.

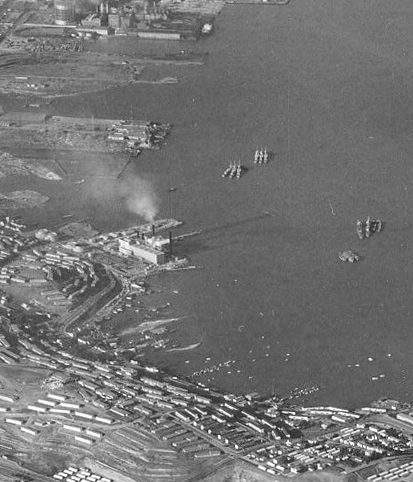
HPPP in 1949

Units 2 and 3 were added in 1948/49 along with three aboveground fuel storage tanks, and some additional land was reclaimed from San Francisco Bay in the southeast part of the site. Unit 4 was added in 1958, along with three more aboveground fuel tanks. A breakwater was added to separate the cooling water intake and outfall in 1968, and a dike was completed between the breakwater and Pier 96 in 1975, completing an enclosed cooling water intake lagoon. Tanks 8 and 9 were built in 1975 and 1977, respectively; in between, a new Unit 1, using two diesel-fired gas turbines for peaking operations, was added in 1976, replacing the original (1929) Unit 1, which had been decommissioned in the early 1970s.

=== Opposition and decommissioning ===
It was one of the oldest and dirtiest oil-fired power plants in the state and was a major source of pollution; studies showed that neighborhood residents were more than twice as likely to suffer from asthma, congestive heart failure, and certain cancers. In the 1990s, the state began studying Hunters Point as a potential site for a new power plant; the San Francisco Board of Supervisors voted to block development of the new plant in June 1996, which Mayor Willie Brown hailed, saying "the people of Bayview–Hunters Point have been dumped on enough."

Residents and community activists next pushed to have HPPP shut down. California utilities were requested to voluntarily divest at least 50% of their fossil fuel-fired generating assets as that state began deregulation of its electric market in 1996, and HPPP was one of the first four plants that PG&E intended to sell, along with Morro Bay, Moss Landing, and Oakland. However, HPPP was dropped from the list when the auction began in September 1997. Because San Francisco is at the tip of the San Francisco Peninsula, its grid was designed to be isolated from the rest of the PG&E system by opening breakers at a substation in Daly City; PG&E argued that the demand for San Francisco could not be met by transmission alone so generation was still required within the "electrical island" to ensure system reliability.

PG&E announced its intent to sell both Hunters Point and Potrero in June 1997, as part of a second auction of fossil-fired and geothermal assets to start in March 1998, also including Contra Costa, Pittsburg, and The Geysers. The City of San Francisco began negotiations with PG&E to purchase HPPP and Potrero, forming a partnership with two private companies; PG&E stated it intended to auction the sites to the highest bidder instead, and the City then threatened to begin eminent domain proceedings on Hunters Point. The California Public Utilities Commission ruled an environmental impact report would be required before PG&E could accept bids, shutting down the planned auction. In July 1998, the City of San Francisco entered an agreement with PG&E to shut down HPPP "as soon as the facility is no longer needed to sustain electric reliability in San Francisco and the surrounding area and the FERC authorizes PG&E to terminate the Reliability Must Run agreement for the facility". In return, the City agreed to not interfere with the sale of Potrero; the uncertainty caused by San Francisco's negotiations had been causing some prospective buyers to hold or delay their bids.

Activists continued to hold protests at HPPP until on May 15, 2006, PG&E permanently shut down the plant; the shutdown had been delayed pending a reliable source of replacement power, which had required upgrades to transmission lines along the Peninsula (Jefferson-Martin Transmission Project) and under San Francisco Bay (Trans Bay Cable). It was demolished in 2008 and cleanup of the site was nearing completion in 2014. PG&E has retained the former switchyard (now used as a substation) along the north side of Evans, and the parcel known as Area I, north of the intersection of Evans and Jennings, which previously was the site of Tanks 1 and 2. Developers were slow to propose new uses for the site. By 2017, the shoreline path around the former power plant site had been incorporated into the San Francisco Bay Trail. The site is used currently as a pop-up community space hosting neighborhood events.

== Design ==
Power generation units at HPPP (1996)
Unit		Capacity (MWe)	Start	Fuel
1		52	1976	diesel (2× aeroderivative combustion turbine)
2	(Main)	110	1948/49	natural gas or fuel oil (steam turbine)
2	(House)	7.5	1948/49	natural gas or fuel oil (steam turbine)
3	(Main)	110	1948/49	natural gas or fuel oil (steam turbine)
3	(House)	7.5	1948/49	natural gas or fuel oil (steam turbine)
4		170	1958	natural gas or fuel oil (steam turbine)

In 1996, the plant had two diesel-fired aeroderivative combustion turbines (collectively known as Unit 1) and three steam turbine-generators (Units 2, 3, and 4) using steam from five boilers (Boilers 3, 4, 5, 6, and 7) that burned natural gas, but which historically had operated on no. 6 fuel oil.

The three steam turbines used approximately 400×10^{6} US gal/d (1.5×10^{6} m^{3}/d) of water drawn from the lagoon in a once-through cooling scheme; cooling water was chlorinated with sodium hypochlorite, circulated through the condenser, then de-chlorinated with sodium bisulfate before being discharged into India Basin. A breakwater was built in 1969 to prevent the heated discharge water from mixing with the lagoon intake; the lagoon was completely enclosed by 1975, when a dike was built between the site and Pier 96.

The site was expanded through extensive filling of the Bay north of Evans and east of Jennings between 1947 and 1958, adding approximately 80 to 100 acres (32 to 40 ha) of land.

=== Fuel storage tanks ===
Fuel storage tanks at HPPP (1996)
Tank No.	Vol	Secondary containment
1	1.7×10^{6} US gal 6.4 Ml	2.3×10^{6} US gal 8.7 Ml
2	1.7×10^{6} US gal 6.4 Ml	2.3×10^{6} US gal 8.7 Ml
3	1.5×10^{6} US gal 5.7 Ml	2.2×10^{6} US gal 8.3 Ml
4	1.7×10^{6} US gal 6.4 Ml	2.3×10^{6} US gal 8.7 Ml
5	1.9×10^{6} US gal 7.2 Ml	2.3×10^{6} US gal 8.7 Ml
6	1.8×10^{6} US gal 6.8 Ml	2.1×10^{6} US gal 7.9 Ml
7	1.8×10^{6} US gal 6.8 Ml	2.2×10^{6} US gal 8.3 Ml
8	10.7×10^{6} US gal 41 Ml	12×10^{6} US gal 45 Ml
9	1.2×10^{6} US gal 4.5 Ml	1.3×10^{6} US gal 4.9 Ml

Aboveground tanks were used to store fuel oil on-site in three closely-spaced sites near the intersection of Evans and Jennings: (1) containing Tanks 1 and 2, in the block north of the intersection; (2) containing Tanks 3, 4, and 8, in the block east of the intersection; and (3) 5, 6, 7, and 9 south of Evans.

Tank 3 was identified in aerial photographs as early as 1935 and may have been part of the original construction. Tanks 1, 2, and 4 were built in 1948 and 1949, when Units 2 and 3 were added. Tanks 5, 6, and 7 were added in 1958 with Unit 4. Tank 8 was identified in a 1975 aerial photograph, and Tank 9 was identified in a 1977 aerial photograph.

Tank 3 also was used to store dielectric oil waste, possibly containing PCBs, from HPPP and other PG&E sites in the 1970s; overflow from Tank 3 was sent to Tank 8 and potentially could have been burned during power plant operation. Prior to 1986, fuel was shipped to Pier 90 by oil tankers and transported to the site through an underground steel pipeline along Cargo Way. By 1996, the only tank still being used for (diesel) fuel storage was Tank 9; Tanks 1-8, previously used for fuel oil storage, had been empty since 1994.

=== Unit characteristics ===
The original Unit 1 was commissioned on December 3, 1929 as Station P, with a generating capacity of 46 megawatts (62×10^{3} hp); the two boilers which served the original Unit 1 were abandoned in place in 1972.

Units 2 and 3 drew from four boilers (designated S3 through S6) with a collective thermal power of 2,680 million British thermal units per hour (790 MW); their collective electric output was 235 MW (315×10^{3} hp), including two smaller turbines designated to serve "house" loads associated with power plant operation. PG&E first announced plans to expand Station P in 1946; although plans for expansion had dated back to 1941, they were delayed by wartime material shortages. Units 2 and 3 were constructed in 1948 and 1949; when they were completed and dedicated on February 8, 1949, they were collectively the largest power plant owned by PG&E. Units 2 and 3 and were shut down permanently in 2001.

PG&E filed a permit application to construct what would become Unit 4 in 1955. Unit 4 drew steam from a single large boiler (designated S7) with a thermal power of 1,720 million British thermal units per hour (500 MW) and generated 170 MW electric output. S7 was permitted to burn natural gas or fuel oil, but the oil-burning capability was deleted in the 2004 permit application, since continued oil burning would have required the boiler to be retrofitted with selective catalytic reduction equipment to meet tightening NOx emissions requirements beyond 2005. Unit 4 began operation in 1958.

PG&E was granted permits to build four peaking power plant units in San Francisco in 1975; one was built at HPPP and the other three were built at Potrero. HPPP Unit 1 was reused as the collective designation for the two diesel-fired peaking turbines (designated S1 and S2), each rated at 364 million British thermal units per hour (107 MW) thermal power and 26 MW electric. The redesignated Unit 1 began operation in 1976.

== See also ==
- List of power stations in California
- Pacific Gas and Electric Company
- Bayview-Hunters Point, San Francisco
