= Evans station (Muni Metro) =

Light rail station in San Francisco

Evans
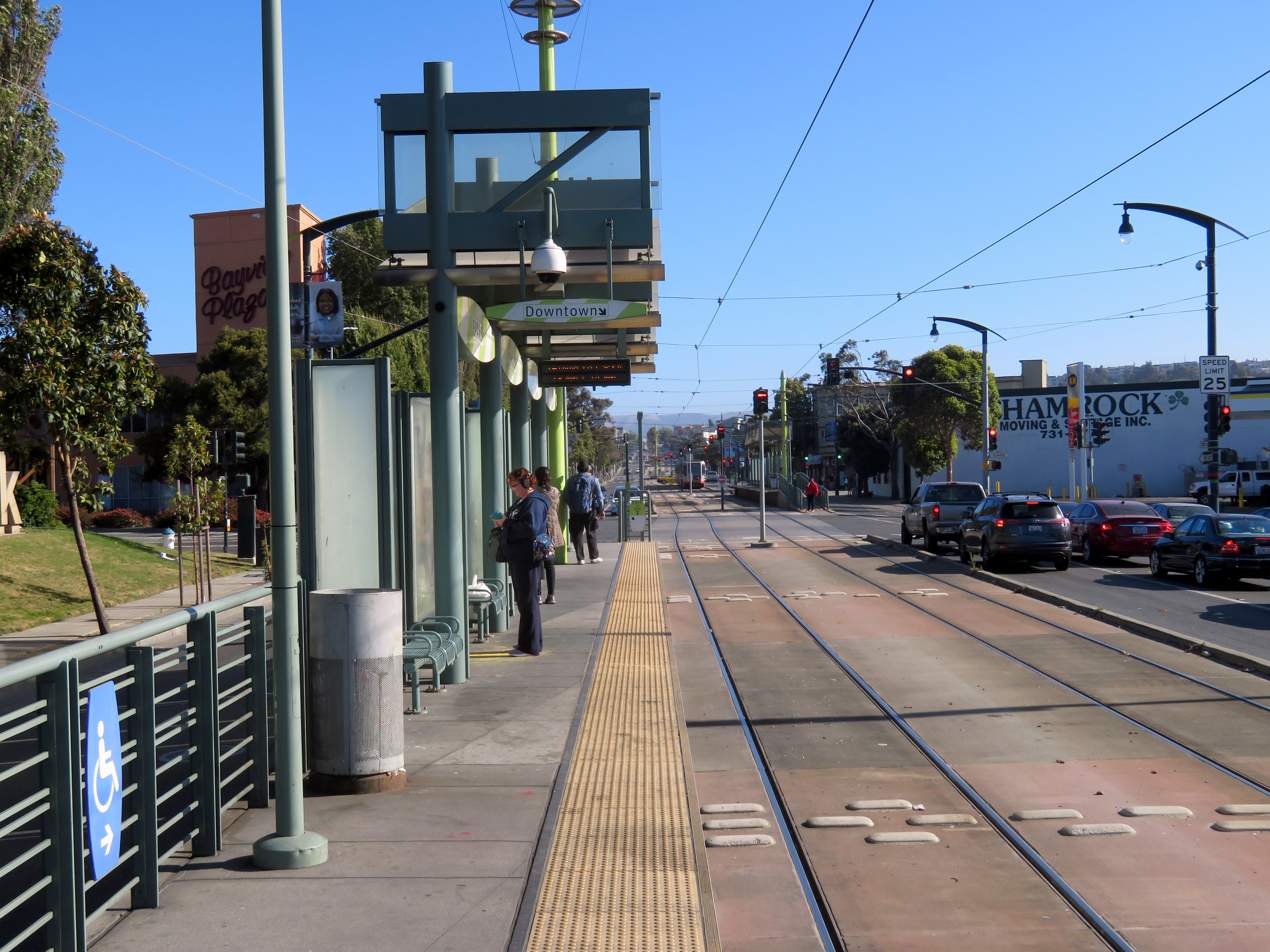
- The northbound platform at Evans station in 2018

General information
- Location: Third Street at Evans Avenue; San Francisco, California
- Coordinates: 37°44′34″N 122°23′16″W
- Platforms: 2 side platforms
- Tracks: 2
- Connections: Muni: 15, 19, 44, 54

Construction
- Cycle facilities: Bay Wheels station
- Accessible: Yes

History
- Opened: January 13, 2007

Services
Preceding station	Muni	Following station
Marin Street toward Chinatown	T Third Street	Hudson/Innes toward Sunnydale
Location

Evans station is a light rail station on the Muni Metro T Third Street line, located in the median of 3rd Street at Evans Avenue in the Bayview neighborhood of San Francisco, California. The station opened with the T Third Street line on January 13, 2007. It has two side platforms; the northbound platform is north of Evans Avenue, and the southbound platform south of Evans Avenue so that trains can pass through the intersection before the station stop.

The station is also served by bus routes 15, 19, 44 and 54, plus the T Bus and 91 Owl bus routes, which provide service along the T Third Street line during the early morning and late night hours respectively when trains do not operate.
