= 20th Street station (Muni Metro) =

Muni Metro light rail stop in San Francisco

20th Street
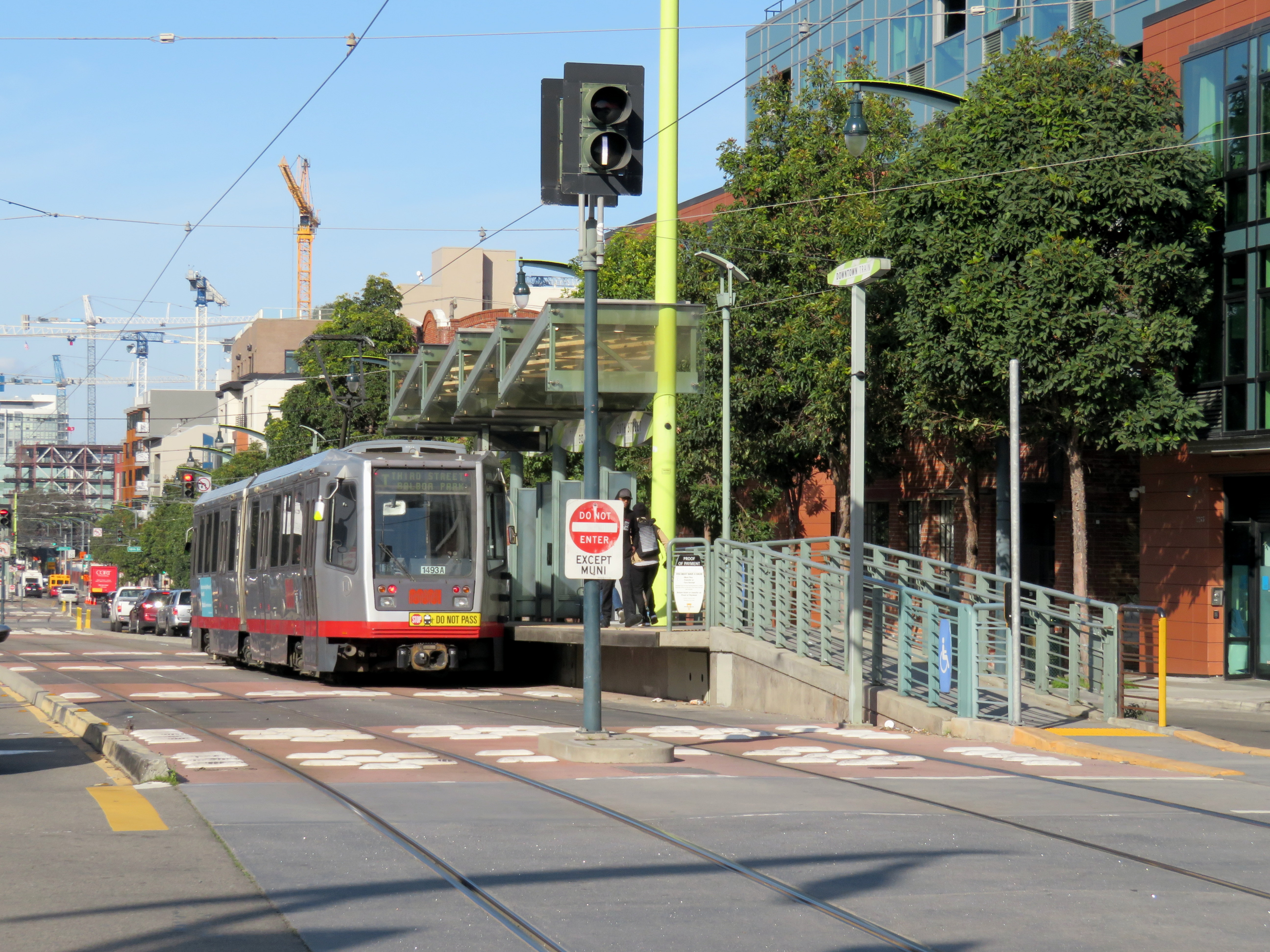
- A northbound train at 20th Street station in January 2018

General information
- Other names: Dogpatch
- Location: Third Street at 20th Street; San Francisco, California
- Coordinates: 37°45′37″N 122°23′19″W
- Platforms: 2 side platforms
- Tracks: 2
- Connections: Muni: 15, 48, 55

Construction
- Cycle facilities: Bay Wheels station
- Accessible: Yes

History
- Opened: January 13, 2007

Services
Preceding station	Muni	Following station
UCSF Medical Center toward Chinatown	T Third Street	23rd Street toward Sunnydale
Location

20th Street station (also signed as Dogpatch) is a light rail station on the Muni Metro T Third Street line in the Dogpatch neighborhood of San Francisco, California. The station opened with the T Third Street line on January 13, 2007. It has two side platforms; the northbound platform is north of 20th Street, and the southbound platform south of 20th Street, so that trains can pass through the intersection before the station stop.

The station is also served by bus routes 15, 48 and 55, plus the T Bus and 91 Owl bus routes, which provide service along the T Third Street line during the early morning and late night hours respectively when trains do not operate.
