= Potrero Generating Station =

Defunct American energy generation

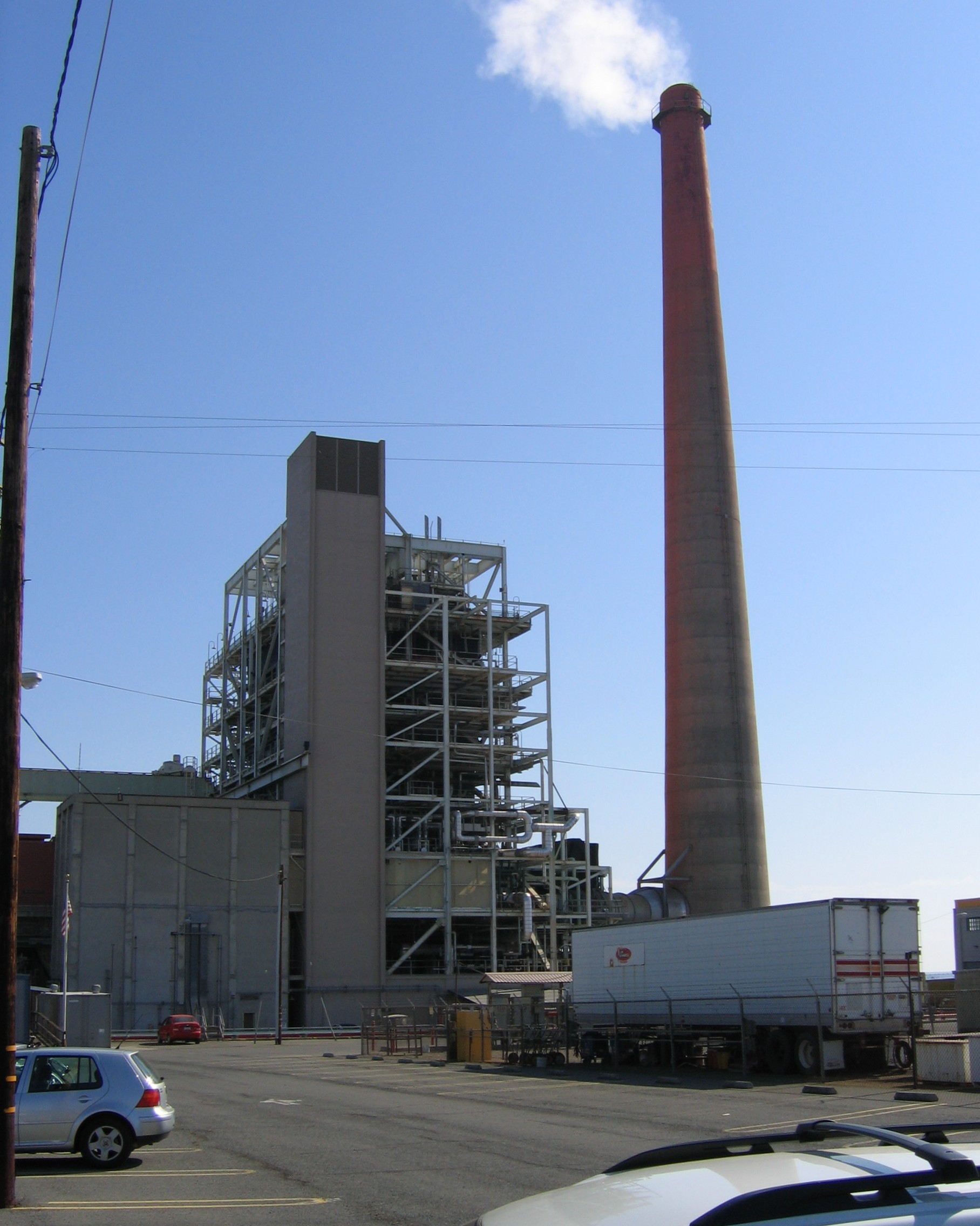
- Unit 3 at the Potrero Generating Station, 2008
- Country: United States
- Location: Potrero Point, San Francisco, California
- Coordinates: 37°45′24″N 122°22′55″W
- Status: Decommissioned
- Commission date: c. 1890 (Station open); December 1, 1965 (Unit 3); 1976 (Units 4–6)
- Decommission date: February 28, 2011
- Owner: Mirant
- Operator: Mirant

Thermal power station
- Primary fuel: Natural gas (Unit 3)
- Secondary fuel: Diesel (Units 4–6)
- Turbine technology: Steam turbine (Unit 3); Combustion turbines (Units 4–6)
- Site area: 23 acres (9.3 ha)
- Cooling source: San Francisco Bay

Power generation
- Make and model: Westinghouse (Unit 3 generator)
- Units decommissioned: 1 x 206 MW (Unit 3); 3 x 52 MW (Units 4–6)
- Nameplate capacity: 362 MW

External links
- Commons: Related media on Commons

The Potrero Generating Station was a natural gas and diesel burning electricity generating station owned by Mirant and located on a 23-acre (9.3 ha) site in Potrero Point, San Francisco, California. The plant's primary power source was a 206 MW, natural gas burning steam turbine providing baseload power and referred to as "Unit 3". In addition, three 52 MW peaking power diesel generators provided additional power during times of highest consumption. Since the closure of the Hunters Point Power Plant in 2006, Potrero was the last remaining fossil fuel power plant within the confines of San Francisco, with capacity to provide approximately 1/3 of the city's peak electrical power needs.

On Dec. 21, 2010, San Francisco Mayor Gavin Newsom announced that the Potrero plant would cease operations by the end of the year. In a press conference announcing the closure, Newsom stated that "this is a monumental step towards cleaner air, environmental justice and our future of renewable energy and healthier communities." The plant was shut down in January 2011, and it was put up for sale for redevelopment in 2012. City officials approved development plans in 2020. As of 2025, a 105-unit apartment building has been completed.

== History and capacity ==
The Potrero power station was located at a site in Potrero Point originally used by San Francisco Gas Light, a provider of gas for cooking and lighting in the late 19th century. Circa 1890 they constructed a small electrical generator at the site, which was the first power plant for the company that would later become Pacific Gas and Electric. Unit 3 was constructed in 1965, making it one of the oldest power plants still operated in California until its closure. The peaking units 4, 5, and 6 were constructed in 1976.

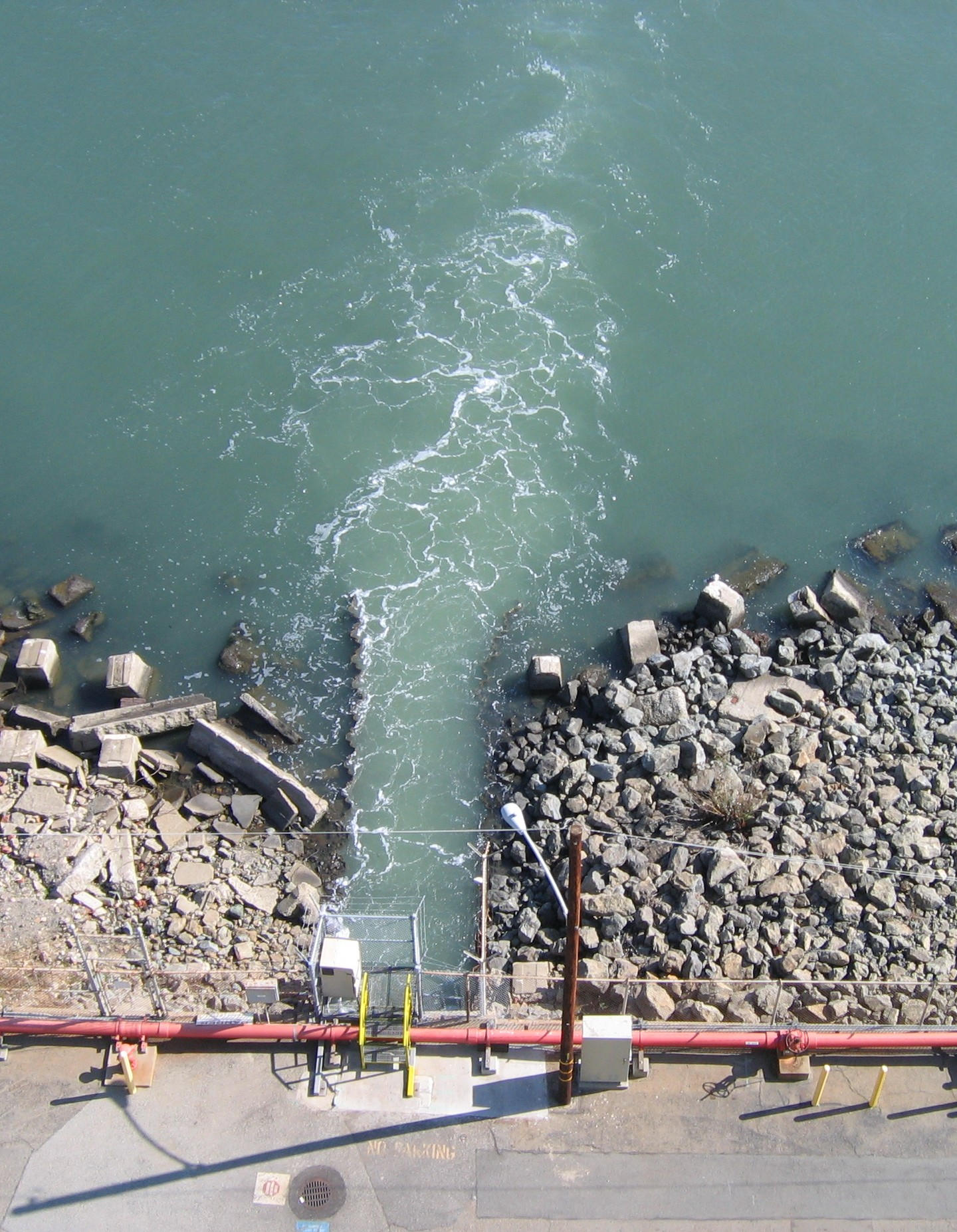
Return flow of heated water to San Francisco Bay from the Potrero Generating Station

Unit 3, the primary power generator, consisted of an eight-story natural gas powered boiler that produced superheated high pressure steam. San Francisco Bay water was purified and heated to produce high pressure steam. This steam was run through a turbine that subsequently turned a 206 MW generator made by Westinghouse. The steam that exited the turbine was then cooled to allow it to condense back into water. The cooling water used in this process operated on a once-through exchange with San Francisco Bay. At full power approximately 10 m^{3}/s (226 million gallons per day) of water were pumped from the subsurface of the Bay, passed through screens and filters to remove debris and prevent biological uptake. The cooling water then passed through the condenser to cool steam used to power the steam turbine. The water was returned to the Bay at about 10 C warmer, usually no warmer than 30 C (86 F).

In addition to the main unit, three 52 MW diesel powered peaking generators could be brought online in four minutes and to peak load in ten minutes notice to meet extra electricity demands as specified by the California Independent System Operator. They were generally operated for only a few hours at a time, usually during peak power consumption in the afternoon. In total, they were generally utilized less than 200 hours per year, though they could be online longer if Unit 3 was offline for an extended period (for example due to maintenance). Fuel for these generators was stored on site and was delivered by tanker truck, though in the past it was delivered directly by ship. There were three large fuel storage tanks at the Potrero facility.

== Closure ==
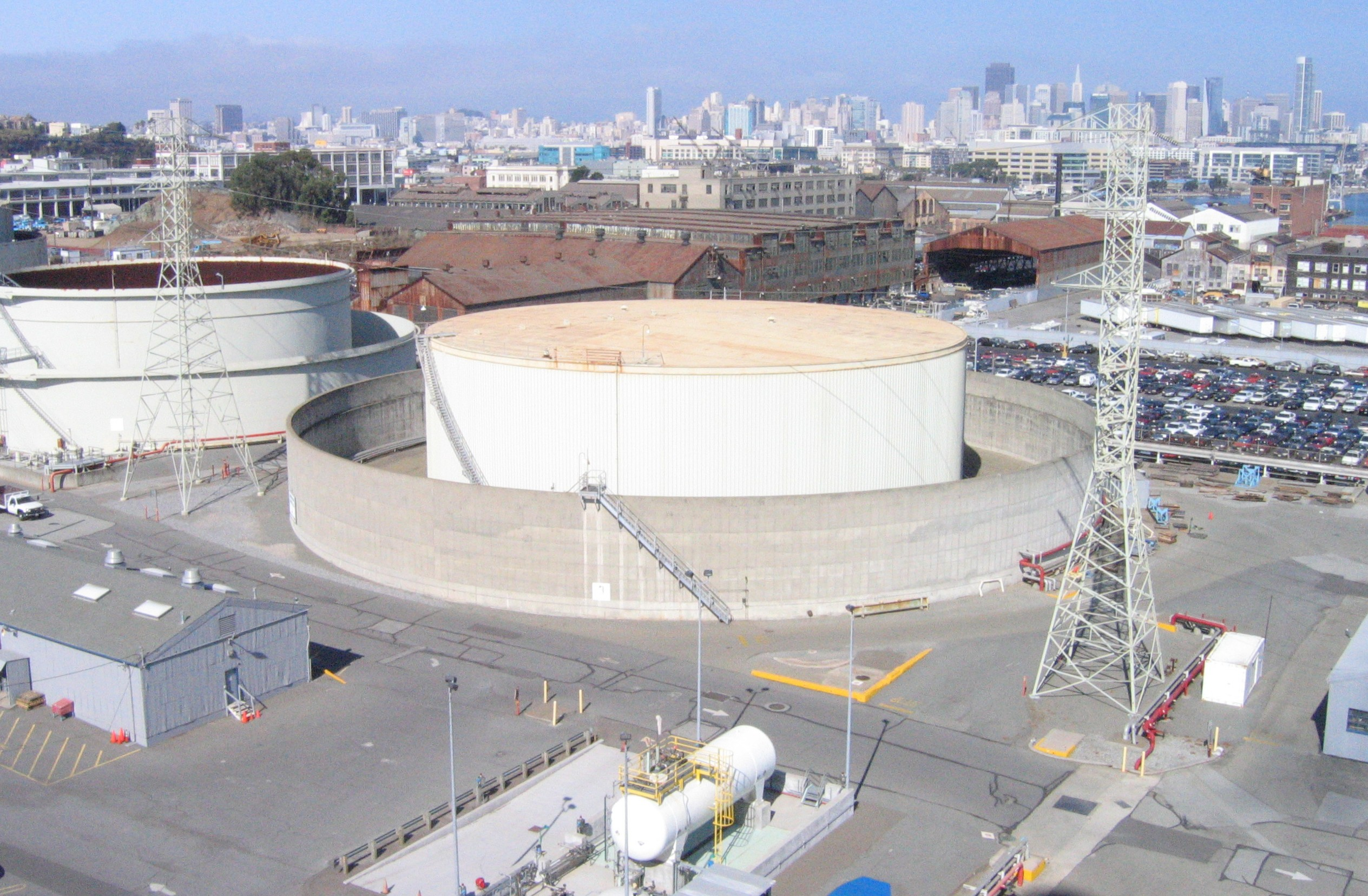
One of three liquid fuel storage vessels at Potrero. The skyline of the City of San Francisco is visible in the background.

For many years an effort had been made by Mirant to expand or upgrade the Potrero Point facility, while many in the local community felt the site should be closed due to health and pollution concerns. In particular, there was concern that the flow of water through the plant was damaging the local environment in the Bay, though Mirant disputed this. On March 2, 2006, the California Public Utilities Commission announced its rejection of Mirant's expansion plans. At that time, the plant was tentatively scheduled to be shut down sometime in 2007 so that a more modern replacement of similar size could be built at the site, but subsequently plans were scaled back and called only for the diesel peaking power generators to be upgraded. The proposed upgrade, estimated to cost between $80 million and $100 million, would have converted the peaking generators to run on natural gas. This would have decreased, but not eliminated, pollution and removed the need to store large quantities of diesel fuel on site.

In 2009 the City of San Francisco and Mirant agreed to close down the plant, pending approval from the California Independent System Operator. CAISO ruled a month later that the plant must stay on line at least through 2010, and only after upgrades to the electrical transmission grid going into San Francisco were completed and the city was able to import sufficient power from other parts of the state to meet all of its needs. Meanwhile, the plant continued to generate thermal pollution by the discharge of heated water to San Francisco Bay, and Mirant had given no indication that it would take any steps to further control those discharges.

On December 21, 2010, San Francisco Mayor Gavin Newsom announced that the Potrero plant would cease operations by the end of the year. Potrero Generating Station was permanently shut down in January 2011. The operator was authorized by the California Public Utilities Commission to permanently close effective midnight February 28, 2011. GenOn Energy, Mirant's parent corporation, will solicit bids to sell the property for redevelopment. Developers expect the area to be used for high-density housing or office space after the site undergoes an environmental cleanup.

== Redevelopment ==
Associate Capital, a firm that focuses on mixed use, in-fill projects that require a long-term vision and focus, bought the site in September 2017.

The proposed project will be a majority residential, mixed-use and mixed-income neighborhood delivering approximately 2,600 homes; 600,000 square feet of office; 600,000 square feet of Research & Development; 100,000 square feet of retail; and community amenities. Anchored by a 300-foot stack, the project will feature 6.66 acres of parks and open space, a boutique hotel adapted from a former steam power facility, and restaurants, cafes, shops and stores.

The development will be adjacent to Pier 70, a mixed commercial and residential use development by Orton Development, Inc. and Forest City Development. As of 2025, a 105-unit apartment building has been completed.

== Gallery ==
Pictures of the Potrero Generating Station following its closure
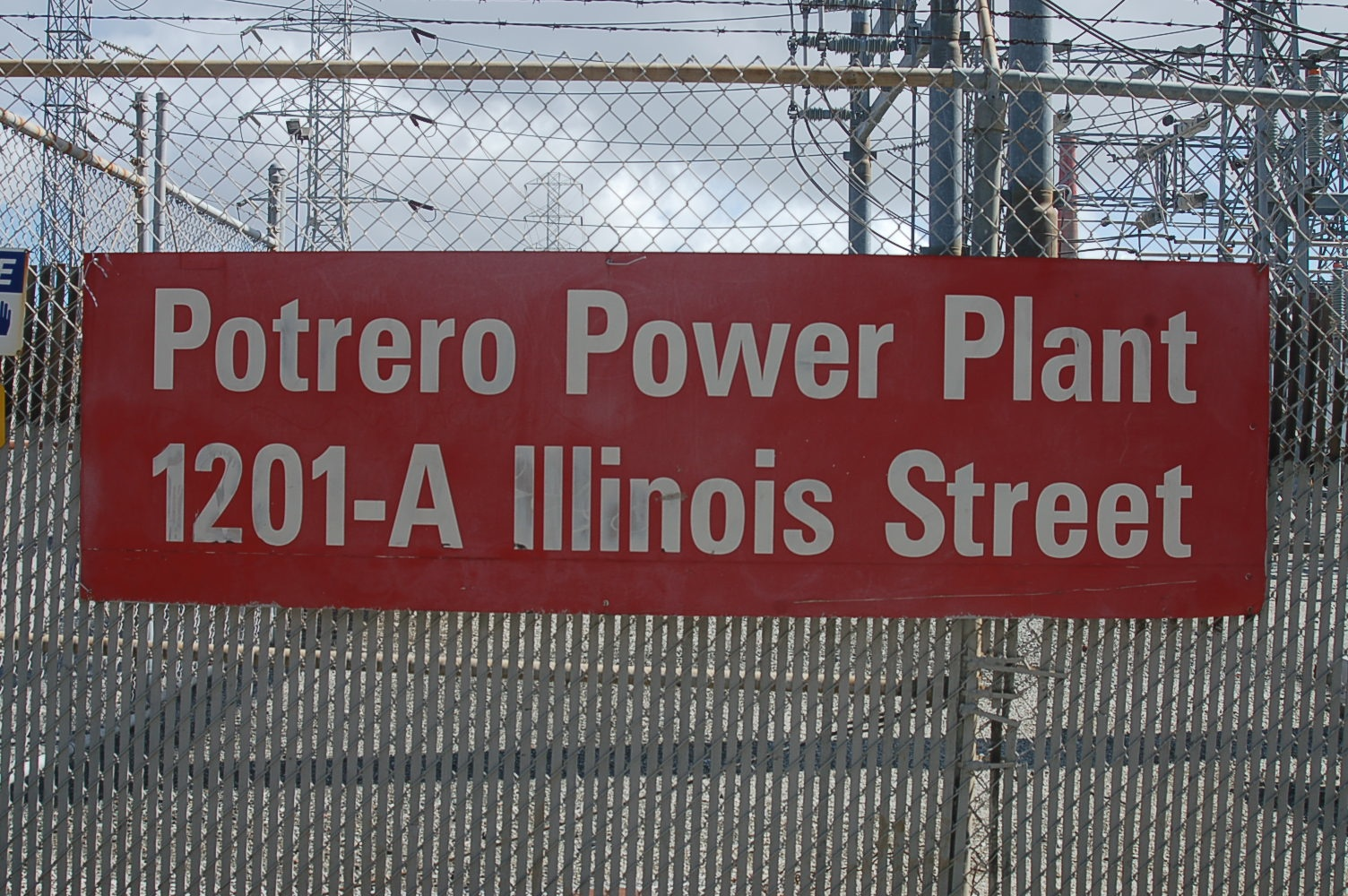
Sign on the gate, 2012

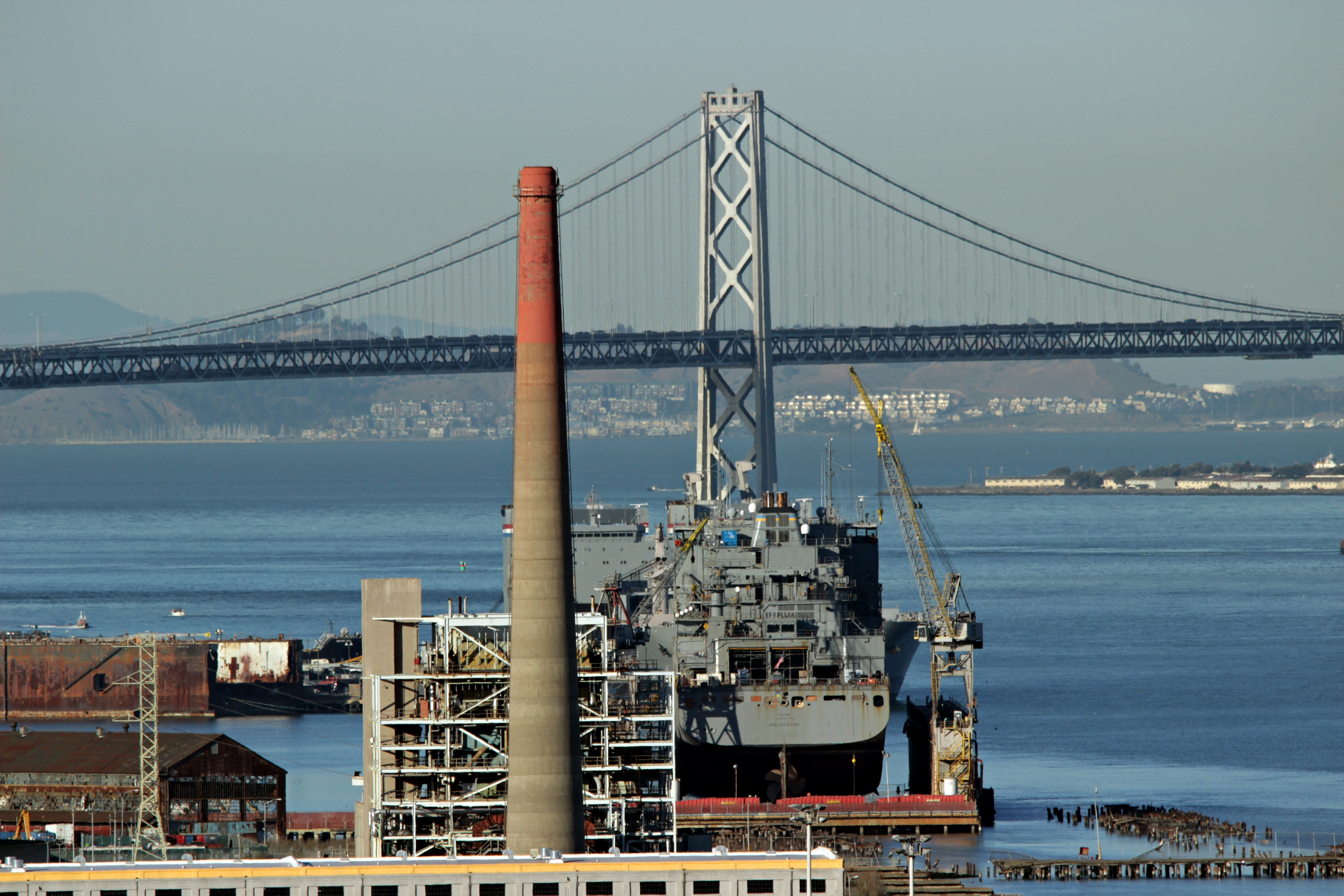
View from Hunter's Point, San Francisco, 2015

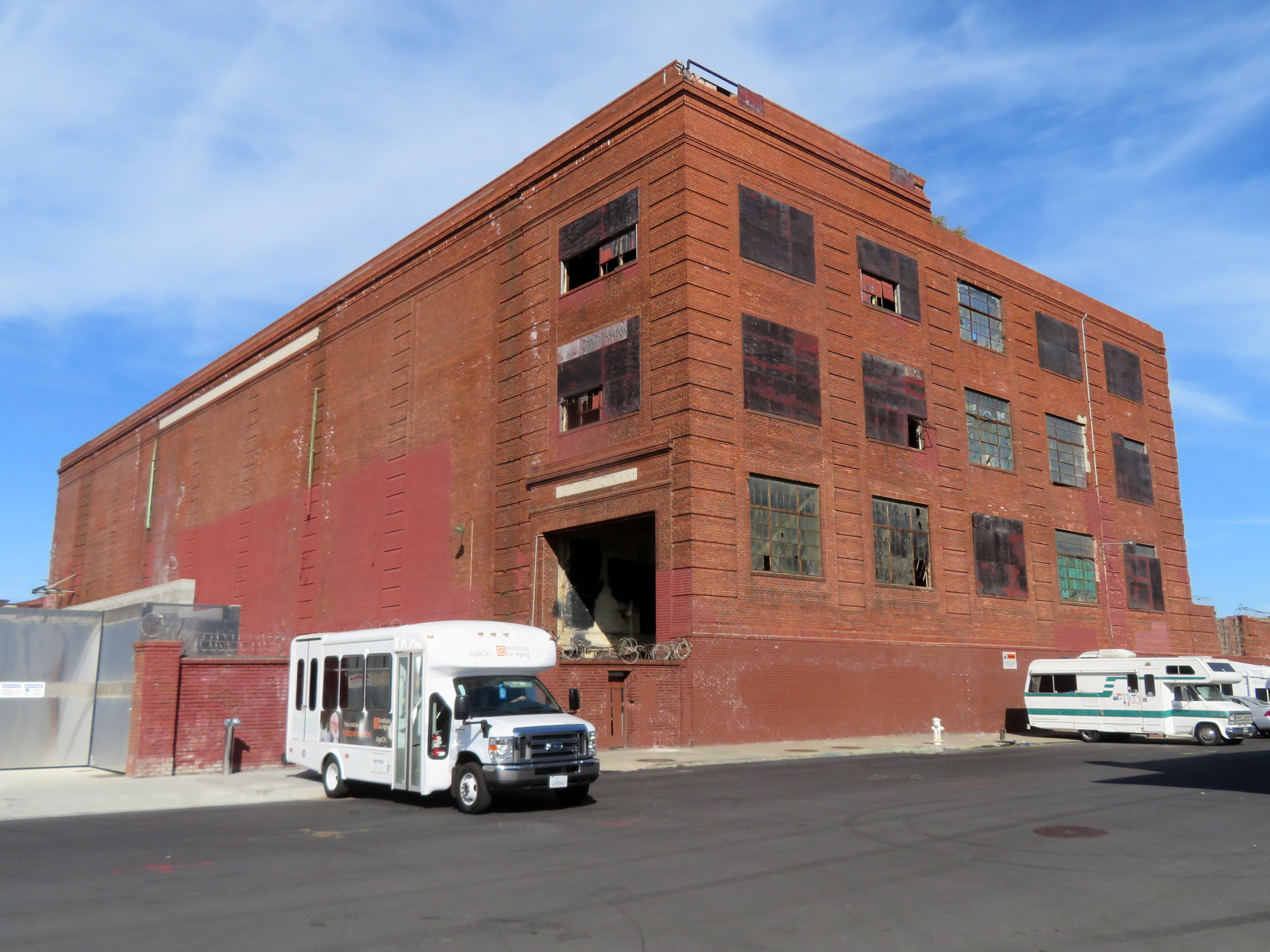
Former Station A turbine hall, 2020
