= Cupertino Electric =

Electrical engineering and construction company

Cupertino Electric, Inc.
- Formerly: Kucher Electric
- Type: Private
- Industry: Electrical engineering, design and construction
- Founded: 1954 in Cupertino, California
- Founder: Eugene Ravizza
- Headquarters: 1132 North Seventh Street; San Jose, California, United States
- Areas served: United States
- Key people: Tom Schott, President and CEO
- Products: modular data center construction
- Services: electrical engineering and construction, consulting, electrical services, procurement
- Revenue: $1.3 billion (2018)
- Website: cei.com

Cupertino Electric is a privately owned electrical engineering and construction company headquartered in San Jose, California. The company operates throughout the United States, providing electrical installation, engineering, energy, renewable energy solar plants, commercial projects, and data centers. It has more than 3,800 field and office employees building projects throughout the nation, with major office locations in San Jose, San Francisco and Whittier, California.

== History ==
In 1954, founder Eugene Ravizza purchased Kucher Electric, an existing electrical contracting company, renaming it Cupertino Electric, Inc. After working on the first fabs for Fairchild Semiconductor and Intel, the business began to expand beyond Silicon Valley, first establishing itself in San Francisco through the acquisition of local firm Collins Electric in 1989, followed by the creation of an office in Phoenix, Arizona in 1996.

In 2000, the company relocated its headquarters to San Jose, California and expanded into the data center business, building NAP of the Americas.

In 2007, Cupertino Electric began constructing the solar electric systems. CEI's main business categories include electrical Data Center, Commercial, Energy (Utility and Renewable), and Modular construction projects. CEI works with some of the largest internet and influential companies in the world and has long-standing relationships with general contracting firms.

== Operations ==
Cupertino Electric is a union contractor with IBEW affiliation.
