= Thermal pollution =

Water temperature changes resulting in degraded water quality

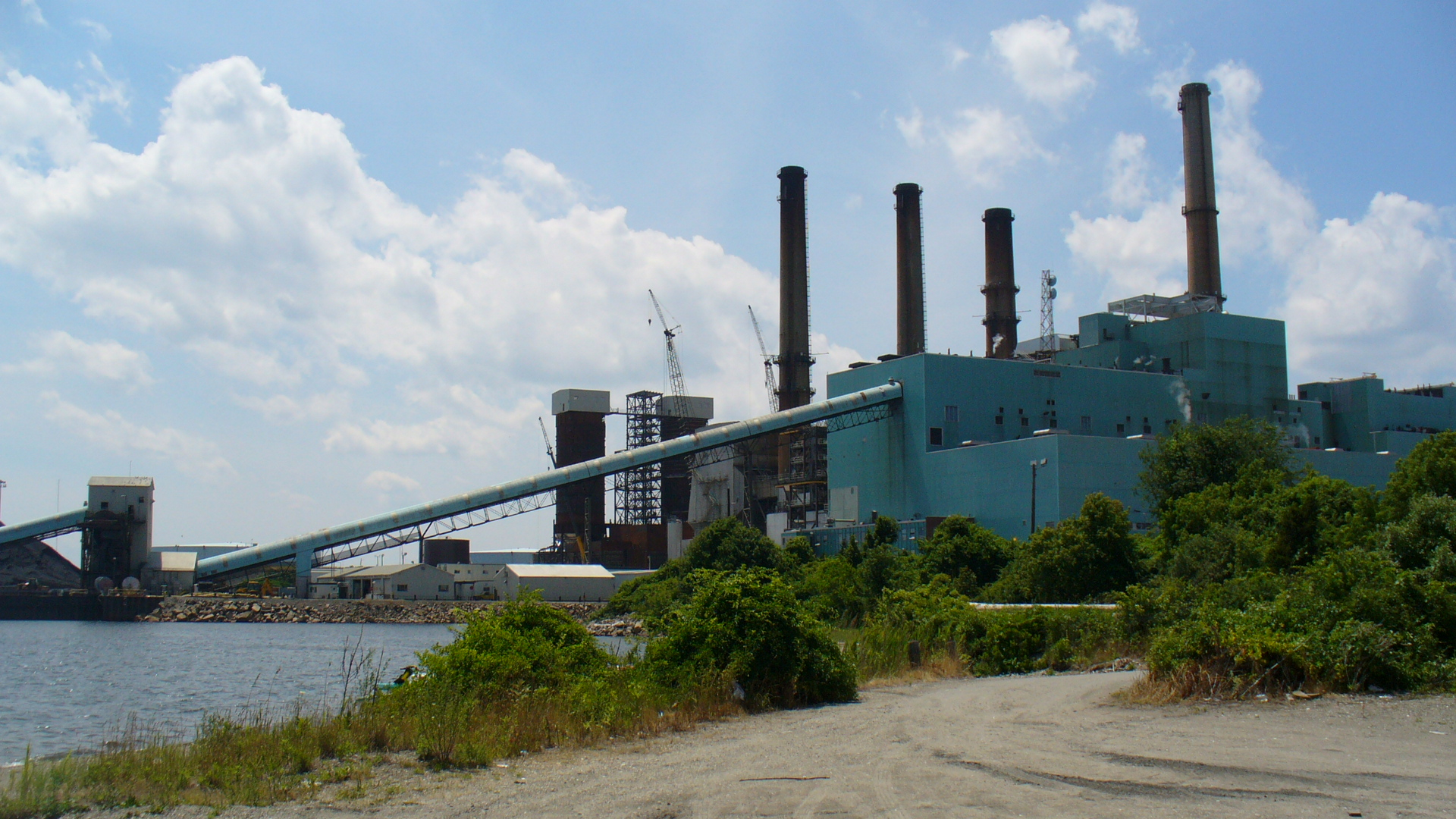
The Brayton Point Power Station in Massachusetts discharged heated water to Mount Hope Bay until 2011. The plant was shut down in June 2017.

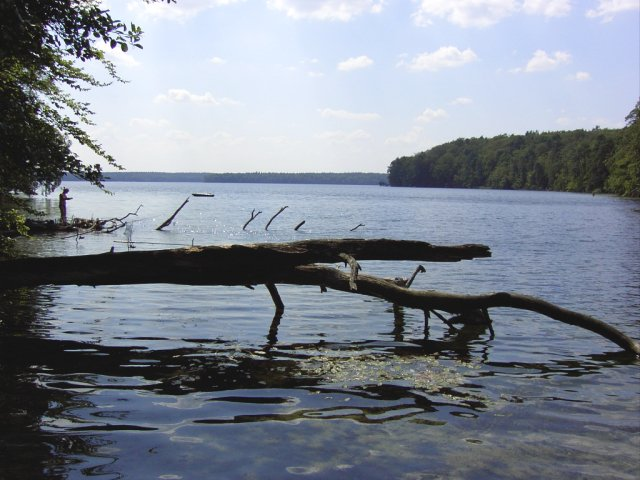
Lake Stechlin, Germany, received coolant discharge from the nuclear power plant Rheinsberg starting in the 1960s. The plant was operational for 24 years, closing in June 1990.

Thermal pollution, sometimes called "thermal enrichment", is the degradation of water quality by any process that changes ambient water temperature. Thermal pollution is the rise or drop in the temperature of a natural body of water caused by human influence. Thermal pollution, unlike chemical pollution, results in a change in the physical properties of water. A common cause of thermal pollution is the use of water as a coolant by power plants and industrial manufacturers. Urban runoff—stormwater discharged to surface waters from rooftops, roads, and parking lots—and reservoirs can also be a source of thermal pollution. Thermal pollution can also be caused by the release of very cold water from the base of reservoirs into warmer rivers.

When water used as a coolant is returned to the natural environment at a higher temperature, the sudden change in temperature decreases oxygen supply and affects ecosystem composition. Fish and other organisms adapted to particular temperature range can be killed by an abrupt change in water temperature (either a rapid increase or decrease) known as "thermal shock". Warm coolant water can also have long term effects on water temperature, increasing the overall temperature of water bodies, including deep water. Seasonality affects how these temperature increases are distributed throughout the water column. Elevated water temperatures decrease oxygen levels, which can kill fish and alter food chain composition, reduce species biodiversity, and foster invasion by new thermophilic species.

== Sources and control of thermal pollution ==
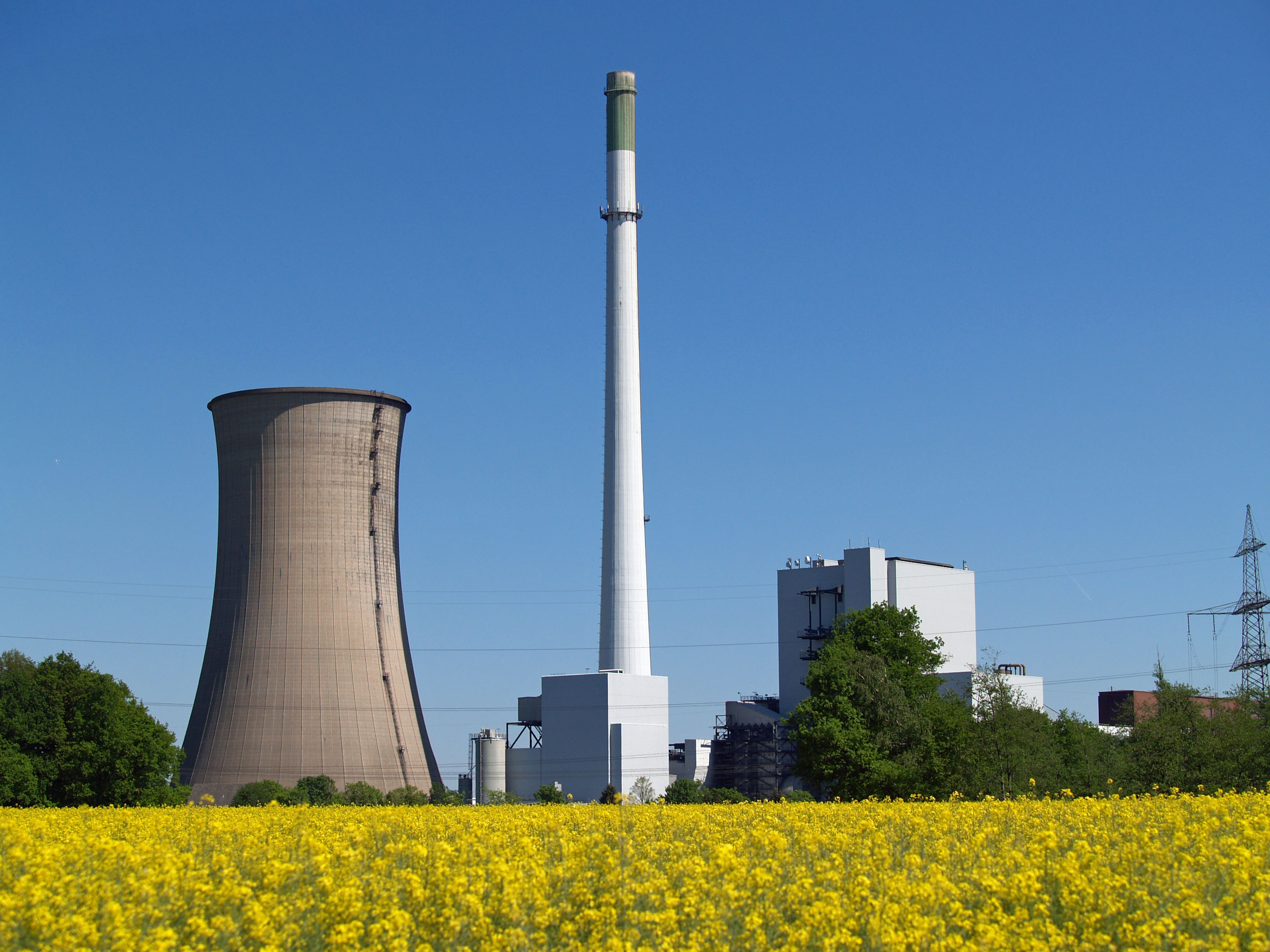
Cooling tower at Gustav Knepper Power Station, Dortmund, Germany

=== Industrial wastewater ===
In the United States about 75 to 80 percent of thermal pollution is generated by power plants. The remainder is from industrial sources such as petroleum refineries, pulp and paper mills, chemical plants, steel mills and smelters.

Heated water from these sources may be controlled with:

- cooling ponds, man-made bodies of water designed for cooling by evaporation, convection, and radiation
- cooling towers, which transfer waste heat to the atmosphere through evaporation and/or heat transfer
- cogeneration, a process where waste heat is recycled for domestic and/or industrial heating purposes.

One of the largest contributors to thermal pollution are once-through cooling (OTC) systems which do not reduce temperature as effectively as the above systems. A large power plant may withdraw and export as many as 500 million gallons per day. These systems produce water 10 °C warmer on average. For example, the Potrero Generating Station in San Francisco (closed in 2011), used OTC and discharged water to San Francisco Bay approximately 10 °C (20 °F) above the ambient bay temperature. Over 1,200 facilities in the United States use OTC systems as of 2014.

Temperatures can be taken through remote sensing techniques to continually monitor plants' pollution. This aids in quantifying each plants' specific effects, and allows for tighter regulation of thermal pollution.

Converting facilities from once-through cooling to closed-loop systems can significantly decrease the thermal pollution emitted. These systems release water at a temperature more comparable to the natural environment.

=== Reservoirs ===
As water stratifies within man-made dams, the temperature at the bottom drops dramatically. Many dams are constructed to release this cold water from the bottom into the natural systems. This may be mitigated by designing the dam to release warmer surface waters instead of the colder water at the bottom of the reservoir.

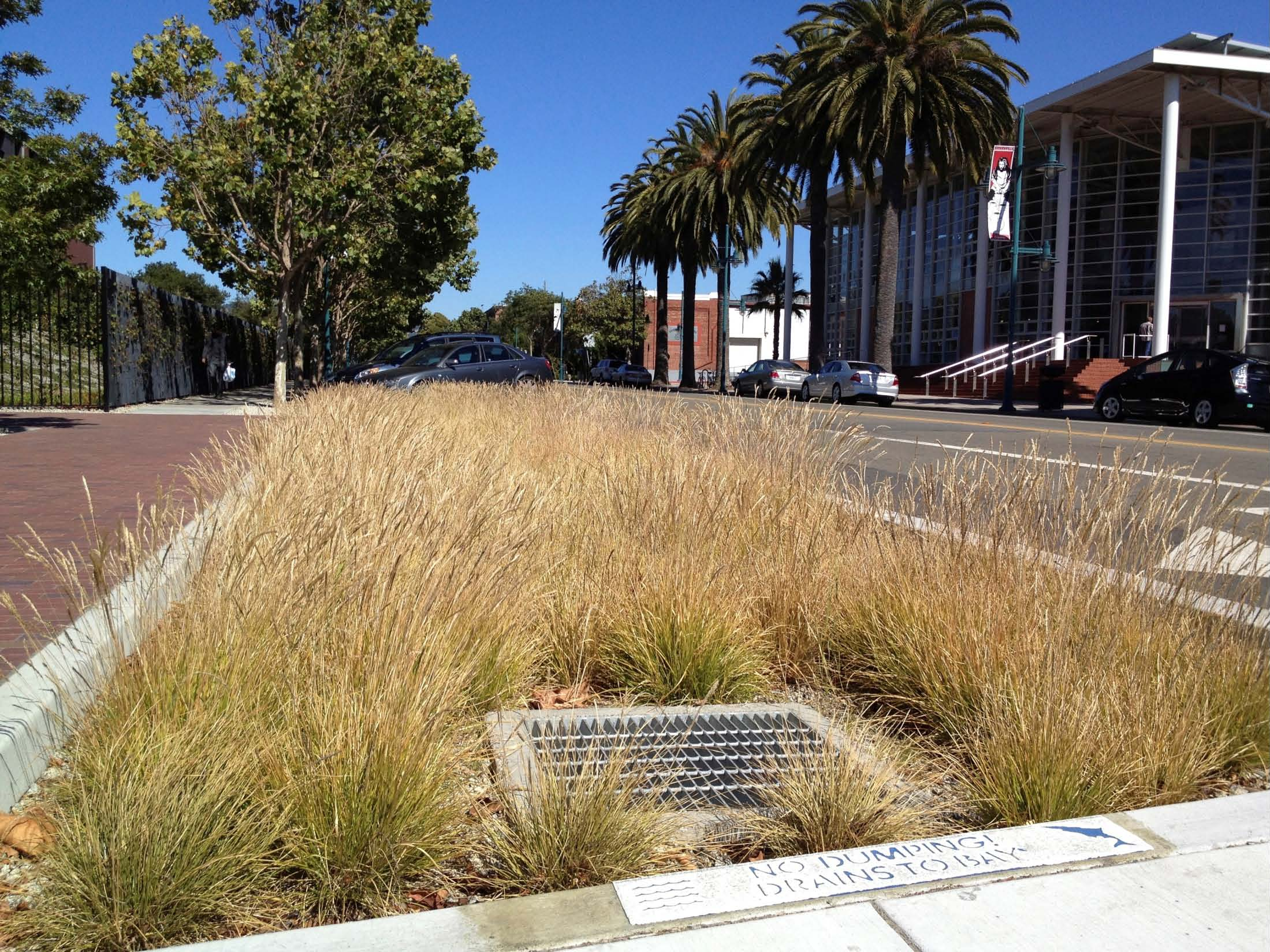
A bioretention cell for treating urban runoff in California

=== Urban runoff ===
During warm weather, urban runoff can have significant thermal impacts on small streams. As storm water passes over hot rooftops, parking lots, roads and sidewalks it absorbs some of the heat, an effect of the urban heat island. Storm water management facilities that absorb runoff or direct it into groundwater, such as bioretention systems and infiltration basins, reduce these thermal effects by allowing the water more time to release excess heat before entering the aquatic environment. These related systems for managing runoff are components of an expanding urban design approach commonly called green infrastructure.

Retention basins (stormwater ponds) tend to be less effective at reducing runoff temperature, as the water may be heated by the sun before being discharged to a receiving stream.

== Effects ==
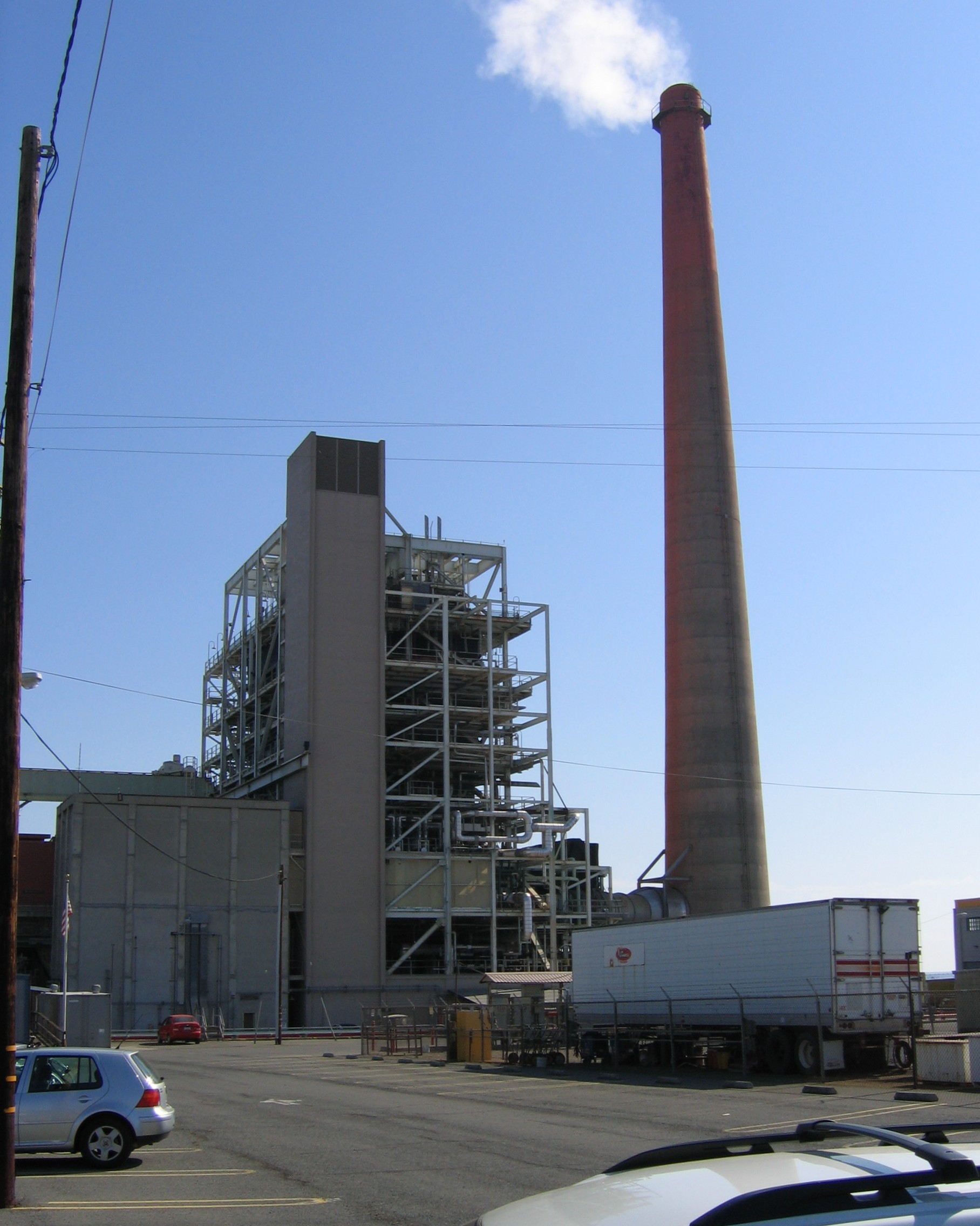
Potrero Generating Station discharged heated water into San Francisco Bay. The plant was closed in 2011.

=== Warm water effects ===
Elevated temperature typically decreases the level of dissolved oxygen and of water, as gases are less soluble in hotter liquids. This can harm aquatic animals such as fish, amphibians and other aquatic organisms. Thermal pollution may also increase the metabolic rate of aquatic animals, as enzyme activity, resulting in these organisms consuming more food in a shorter time than if their environment were not changed. An increased metabolic rate may result in fewer resources; the more adapted organisms moving in may have an advantage over organisms that are not used to the warmer temperature. As a result, food chains of the old and new environments may be compromised. Some fish species will avoid stream segments or coastal areas adjacent to a thermal discharge. Biodiversity can be decreased as a result.

High temperature limits oxygen dispersion into deeper waters, contributing to anaerobic conditions. This can lead to increased bacteria levels when there is ample food supply. Many aquatic species will fail to reproduce at elevated temperatures.

Primary producers (e.g. plants, cyanobacteria) are affected by warm water because higher water temperature increases plant growth rates, resulting in a shorter lifespan and species overpopulation. The increased temperature can also change the balance of microbial growth, including the rate of algae blooms which reduce dissolved oxygen concentrations.

Temperature changes of even one to two degrees Celsius can cause significant changes in organism metabolism and other adverse cellular biology effects. Principal adverse changes can include rendering cell walls less permeable to necessary osmosis, coagulation of cell proteins, and alteration of enzyme metabolism. These cellular level effects can adversely affect mortality and reproduction.

A large increase in temperature can lead to the denaturing of life-supporting enzymes by breaking down hydrogen- and disulphide bonds within the quaternary structure of the enzymes. Decreased enzyme activity in aquatic organisms can cause problems such as the inability to break down lipids, which leads to malnutrition. Increased water temperature can also increase the solubility and kinetics of metals, which can increase the uptake of heavy metals by aquatic organisms. This can lead to toxic outcomes for these species, as well as build up of heavy metals in higher trophic levels in the food chain, increasing human exposures via dietary ingestion.

In limited cases, warm water has little deleterious effect and may even lead to improved function of the receiving aquatic ecosystem. This phenomenon is seen especially in seasonal waters. An extreme case is derived from the aggregational habits of the manatee, which often uses power plant discharge sites during winter. Projections suggest that manatee populations would decline upon the removal of these discharges.

=== Cold water ===
Releases of unnaturally cold water from reservoirs can dramatically change the fish and macroinvertebrate fauna of rivers, and reduce river productivity. In Australia, where many rivers have warmer temperature regimes, native fish species have been eliminated, and macroinvertebrate fauna have been drastically altered. Survival rates of fish have dropped up to 75% due to cold water releases.

=== Thermal shock ===
When a power plant first opens or shuts down for repair or other causes, fish and other organisms adapted to particular temperature range can be killed by the abrupt change in water temperature, either an increase or decrease, known as "thermal shock".

=== Biogeochemical effects ===
Water warming effects, as opposed to water cooling effects, have been the most studied with regard to biogeochemical effects. Much of this research is on the long term effects of nuclear power plants on lakes after a nuclear power plant has been removed. Overall, there is support for thermal pollution leading to an increase in water temperatures. When power plants are active, short term water temperature increases are correlated with electrical needs, with more coolant released during the winter months. Water warming has also been seen to persist in systems for long periods of time, even after plants have been removed.

When warm water from power plant coolant enters systems, it often mixes leading to general increases in water temperature throughout the water body, including deep cooler water. Specifically in lakes and similar water bodies, stratification leads to different effects on a seasonal basis. In the summer, thermal pollution has been seen to increase deeper water temperature more dramatically than surface water, though stratification still exists, while in the winter surface water temperatures see a larger increase. Stratification is reduced in winter months due to thermal pollution, often eliminating the thermocline.

A study looking at the effect of a removed nuclear power plant in Lake Stechlin, Germany, found a 2.33 °C increase persisted in surface water during the winter and a 2.04 °C increase persisted in deep water during the summer, with marginal increases throughout the water column in both winter and summer. Stratification and water temperature differences due to thermal pollution seem to correlate with nutrient cycling of phosphorus and nitrogen, as oftentimes water bodies that receive coolant will shift toward eutrophication. No clear data has been obtained on this though, as it is difficult to differentiate influences from other industry and agriculture.

Similar to effects seen in aquatic systems due to climatic warming of water, thermal pollution has also been seen to increase surface temperatures in the summer. This can create surface water temperatures that lead to releases of warm air into the atmosphere, increasing air temperature. It therefore can be seen as a contributor to global warming. Many ecological effects will be compounded by climate change as well, as ambient temperature rises in water bodies.

Spacial and climatic factors can impact the severity of water warming due to thermal pollution. High wind speeds tend to increase the impact of thermal pollution. Rivers and large bodies of water also tend to lose the effects of thermal pollution as they progress from the source.

Rivers present a unique problem with thermal pollution. As water temperatures are elevated upstream, power plants downstream receive warmer waters. Evidence of this effect has been seen along the Mississippi River, as power plants are forced to use warmer waters as their coolants. This reduces the efficiency of the plants and forces the plants to use more water and produce more thermal pollution.

== See also ==
- Water cooling
- Water pollution
