= Elizabeth Ginno =

American painter & printmaker

- Born: 1907; Plumstead, England
- Died: 1991 (aged 83–84); El Cerrito, California
- Education: Mills College
- Spouses: Carol Aronovici; John Winkler

Elizabeth de Gebele Ginno (1907–1991) was a fine artist from Berkeley, California specializing in painting and printmaking. She is known for her participation in the Golden Gate International Exposition (GGIE) and other Works Progress Administration (WPA) projects.

== Biography ==
Born in 1907 in Plumstead, England while her parents were on vacation, Ginno was raised as a third generation resident of Berkeley, California. She attended Mills College in Oakland, California where she majored in art and drama. While at Mills, Ginno met two of her greatest influences, photographer Imogen Cunningham and her husband Roi Partridge, a famous printmaker. Ginno also met future husband Carol Aronovici while at Mills College. The two became engaged in 1928 and later married. Together they co-founded Stagecraft Studios, a theatrical supply business, before divorcing in 1934. While at Stagecraft studios, Ginno honed her skills in costume design, set design, and makeup.

After her divorce, Ginno met Austrian artist and etcher John Winkler, who trained her in drawing and etching. Ginno's friendships as well as her continued artistic education led to greater artistic exposure, including exhibits at galleries and venues in Williamstown, Massachusetts, San Francisco, California, and New York City, New York. In 1949 John Winkler and Ginno married. Ginno joined the California Society of Etchers (CSE) and later served as the president for 15 years. Her work was later shown at the Fine Arts Museum of San Francisco, the Chicago Art Institute, and the Boston Printmakers Gallery.

Called one of the "most culturally significant, pre-World War II events to affect the public perception of west coast art", the 1940 Golden Gate International Exposition (GGIE) World's Fair was held on Treasure Island outside of San Francisco. While there, she joined sixty other artists in an Art in Action exhibit, showcasing the active creation of their art, including Diego Rivera, who created his mural, Pan-American Unity while in attendance. Ginno's costume design experience joined with her experience at the World's Fair cumulated in the creation of seventy-five sketches of "depicting men, women, and children of various cultures in traditional dress". Her etchings include depictions of Russia, Portugal, Finland, Alsatia, Croatia, Scotland, Romania, Finland and France, with relatively few from Africa, and none of Asian groups. Ginnos work "appears to have focused on countries impacted by the war in Europe".

Elizabeth died in 1991 in El Cerrito, California after having worked for more than thirty five years at the Engineering Department at the University of California, Berkeley as a draftsman and illustrator.
