= David Klein =

David Klein or Dave Klein may refer to:

- David Klein (American artist) (1918–2005), American artist
- David Klein (businessman) (born 1946), American inventor of the Jelly Belly brand jelly bean
- David Klein (chess player) (born 1993), Dutch chess grandmaster
- David Klein (cinematographer) (born 1972), American cinematographer
- David Klein (Constellation Brands), American businessman
- David Klein (economist) (1935–2021), former governor of the Bank of Israel
- David Klein (footballer) (born 1973), French soccer player
- David Klein (mathematician) (born 1953), American professor of mathematics
- David Klein (ophthalmologist) (1908–1993), Swiss ophthalmologist

- Dave Klein (musician), American producer, composer and musician
- Dave Klein (punk musician) (born 1979), American bass guitarist
