= Thelma Johnson Streat =

American painter

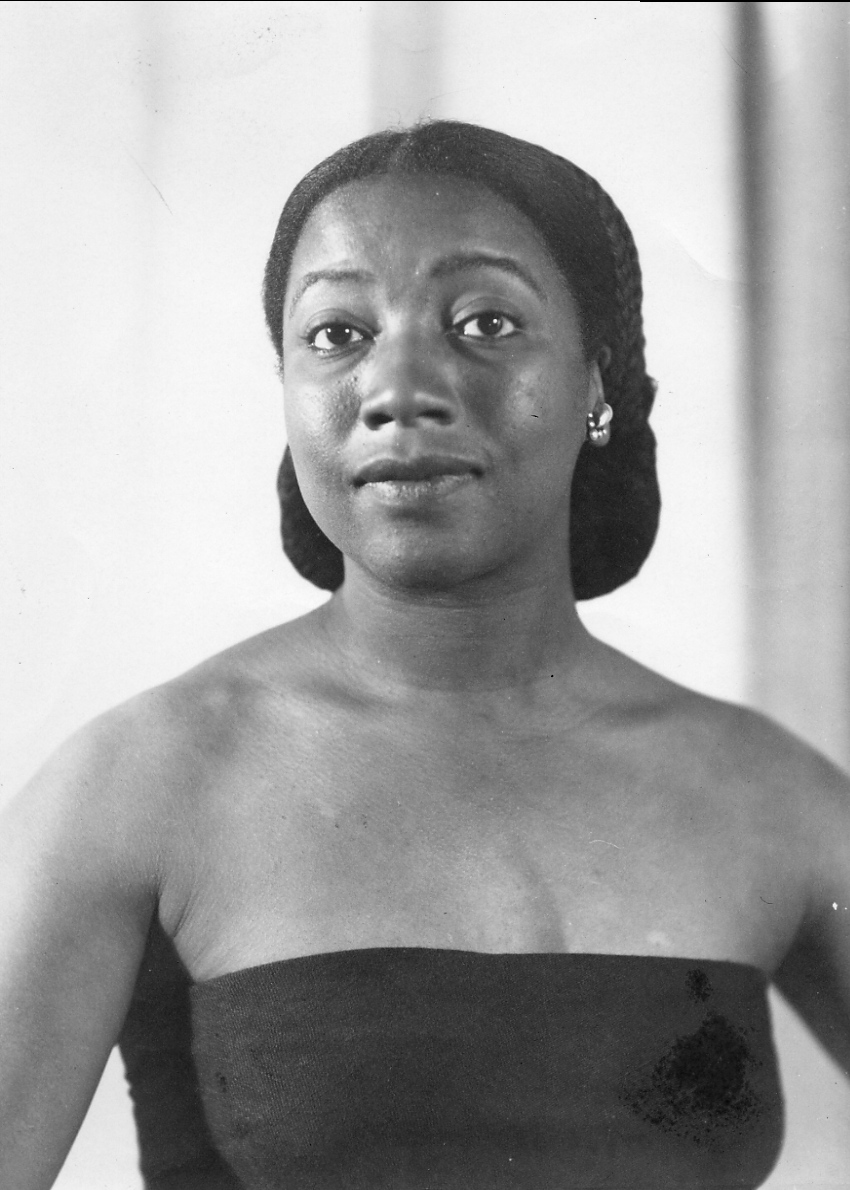
- Born: Thelma Johnson; August 29, 1912; Yakima, Washington, U.S.
- Died: May 1959 (aged 46); Los Angeles, California, U.S.
- Education: Museum Art School in Portland
- Known for: Painting, dance
- Spouses: Romaine Virgil Streat (m. 1935–1948); John Edgar Kline (m. 1948)

Thelma Beatrice Johnson Streat (1912–1959) was an African-American artist, dancer, and educator. She gained prominence in the 1940s for her art, performance and work to foster intercultural understanding and appreciation.

== Early life and education ==
Thelma Johnson was born August 29, 1912, in Yakima, a small agricultural town in Washington State, to artist James Johnson, who encouraged her to become an artist, and his wife Gertrude. She was partially of Cherokee heritage. Her family moved to Portland, Oregon when she was a young child. In 1932, she graduated from Washington High School. She began painting at the age of seven and studied art at the Museum Art School (now Pacific Northwest College of Art) in Portland from 1934 to 1935. She took additional art courses at the University of Oregon from 1935 to 1936.

== Art work ==
The work of Thelma Johnson Streat is in my opinion one of the most interesting manifestations in this country at the present. It is extremely evolved and sophisticated enough to reconquer the grace and purity of African and American art.

— Diego Rivera, artist

Streat expressed herself through different creative avenues, including oil and watercolor paintings, pen and ink drawings, charcoal sketches, mixed media murals, and textile design.

A year after her high school graduation, Streat had paintings on exhibit at the New York City, New York Public Library under sponsorship of the Oregon Federation of Colored Women and the Harmon Foundation. In 1938, she moved to San Francisco where she participated in Works Progress Administration projects. Streat was also included in exhibitions at the De Young Memorial Museum and San Francisco Museum of Art (now the San Francisco Museum of Modern Art). In 1939 until 1940, she assisted artist Diego Rivera in the creation of the Pan American Unity mural, for the Art in Action exhibition at Treasure Island's Golden Gate International Exposition (GGIE). A portrait of Streat, just one of Rivera's many friends depicted in the mural, can be seen at City College of San Francisco (CCSF) in the Diego Rivera Theatre located at CCSF's Ocean Campus. The mural is currently undergoing restoration and will be featured in the SFMOMA's retrospective exhibition on Rivera in 2020.

As Judy Bullington argues in her indispensable article on Streat, "the West Coast allowed highly visible indigenous traditions that generated a different kind of regional flavor from which modernists could draw inspiration. Streat’s ability to blend these multiple influences into a modernist mode enabled her to attract the attention of Hollywood arts collectors, to capture headlines across the United States, and, in the 1940s and 1950s, even to gain some international recognition."

Her work was sometimes controversial. The Los Angeles Times reported that Streat was threatened by the Ku Klux Klan for her painting called "Death of a Negro Sailor", portraying an African-American sailor dying after risking his life abroad to protect the democratic rights he was denied at home. The threat only made Streat believe that a program showing not only the Negro's tribulations but also the Negro's contributions to the nation's wealth was needed, so she initiated a visual education program called "The Negro in History."

Through a series of murals depicting the contributions of people of African descent, panels showed Black Americans in industry, agriculture, medicine, science, meat packing, and transportation. There was even a panel on the contributions of Black women.

Streat's work often portrayed important figures in history. Along with images of well-known Americans like Frank Lloyd Wright, she painted a series of portraits of famous people of African ancestry, including concert singer Marian Anderson, singer/actor/activist Paul Robeson, Toussaint Louverture, and Harriet Tubman, and more. As a pioneer in modern African American art, her work influenced and was influenced by Jacob Lawrence, Sargent Johnson, Romare Bearden, William H. Johnson, and the other artistic leaders of her time. Her ability to integrate dance, song and folklore from a variety of cultures into a presentation package and utilize it to educate and inspire an appreciation across ethnic lines was revolutionary for her time.

=== Collections ===
Her most well-known painting, Rabbit Man, was purchased by Alfred Barr for MoMA in 1942. Streat was the first African-American woman to have a painting included in MoMA's permanent collection. Streat's work was added to the permanent collection of the Smithsonian when they purchased the mural Medicine and Transportation in 2016, which resides in the National Museum of African American History & Culture in Washington, D.C. Streat painted Medicine and Transportation between 1942 and 1944, which features the contributions of African-Americans at work in a laboratory and industrial settings.

The Mills College Art Museum in Oakland, California also possesses a children's book illustration by Streat titled Robot.

People who have owned Streat's work include actor Vincent Price, singer Roland Hayes, artist Diego Rivera, actress Fanny Brice, dancer Katherine Dunham, and actress Paulette Goddard.

=== Select exhibitions ===
Her paintings have appeared in exhibits at museums and galleries including:

- 1938 – Displeased Lady, San Francisco Museum of Modern Art, San Francisco, California
- 1941 – De Young Museum, San Francisco, California
- 1942 – Raymond & Raymond Gallery, New York City, New York
- 1942 – New Acquisitions: American Painting and Sculpture, Museum of Modern Art, New York City, New York
- 1943 – The Little Gallery, owned by actor and art collector Vincent Price, Beverly Hills, Los Angeles, California
- 1943 – The International Exhibit of Watercolor, Art Institute of Chicago, Chicago, Illinois
- 1946 – Performance debut of her new choreography, San Francisco Museum of Modern Art, San Francisco, California
- 1991 – The Search for Freedom: African American Abstraction 1945-1975, Kenkeleba Gallery, New York City, New York
- 2003 – Portland Art Museum, Portland, Oregon
- 2017 and onward – Visual Art and the American Experience, (permanent art exhibition), Smithsonian's National Museum of African American History & Culture, Washington, D.C.
- American Contemporary Art Gallery, Münich, Germany
- Honolulu Academy of Art, Honolulu, Hawaii
- Albany Institute of the History of Art, Albany, New York

== Dancer, singer, and folklorist ==
Similar to her contemporary and acquaintance Katherine Dunham, Streat traveled to Haiti between 1946 and 1951 to study dance, which she saw as an important inspiration of social change and a catalyst for challenging societal norms. She also visited Mexico and Canada. Streat debuted her new choreography, inspired by her travels, in a performance at the San Francisco Museum of Art in 1946, which combined African, Haitian, Hawaiian, Native American, Portuguese and other indigenous dance forms.

Streat realized that prejudice and bigotry are learned, usually during childhood. In order to combat the development of bigotry, throughout the 1940s and 50s, Streat performed dances, songs, and folk tales from many cultures to thousands of children across Europe, Canada, Mexico, and the United States in an effort to introduce them to the beauty and value of all cultures.

== Teacher and activist ==
In 1945, Streat chaired a committee in Chicago to sponsor murals as part of a "Negro in Labor" education movement. Between 1948 and 1950, Streat moved to Hawaii with her second husband Edgar Kline, and they founded Children's City of Hawaii and New School of Expression in Punaluu, Oahu to introduce children to art and to the value of cultural diversity. A second Children's City school was founded on Salt Spring Island in British Columbia, Canada in 1956.

== Honors and accomplishments ==
- Gained national recognition at age 18, when her painting titled "A Priest" won honorable mention at the Harmon Foundation exhibit in New York City (1929).
- First African-American woman to have a painting exhibited at the Museum of Modern Art (MOMA) in New York (1942).
- Headed the Children's Education Project to introduce American kids to the contributions of African Americans through a series of colorful murals.
- Was threatened by the KKK for exhibiting a painting honoring a Black American sailor's sacrifice.
- Performed a dance recital at Buckingham Palace for the King and Queen of the United Kingdom (1950).
- First American woman to have her own television program in Paris (1949).
- Worked with Mexican muralist Diego Rivera on his Pan American Unity mural in San Francisco in 1939.
- By 1947, one of only four African American abstract painters to have had solo shows in New York City. The other three were Romare Bearden, Rose Piper, and Norman Lewis.

== Personal life and death ==
She married Romaine Virgil Streat in 1935, and they divorced in 1948. Streat continued to use her married name for professional purposes. Later that year, she married John Edgar Kline, her manager and a playwright and producer of both theatre and film.

Streat died of a heart attack 21 May 1959, Los Angeles, California.

== See also ==
- List of African-American visual artists
- List of 20th-century women artists
