= Helen Crlenkovich =

American athlete (1921–1955)

Helen Crlenkovich Morgan
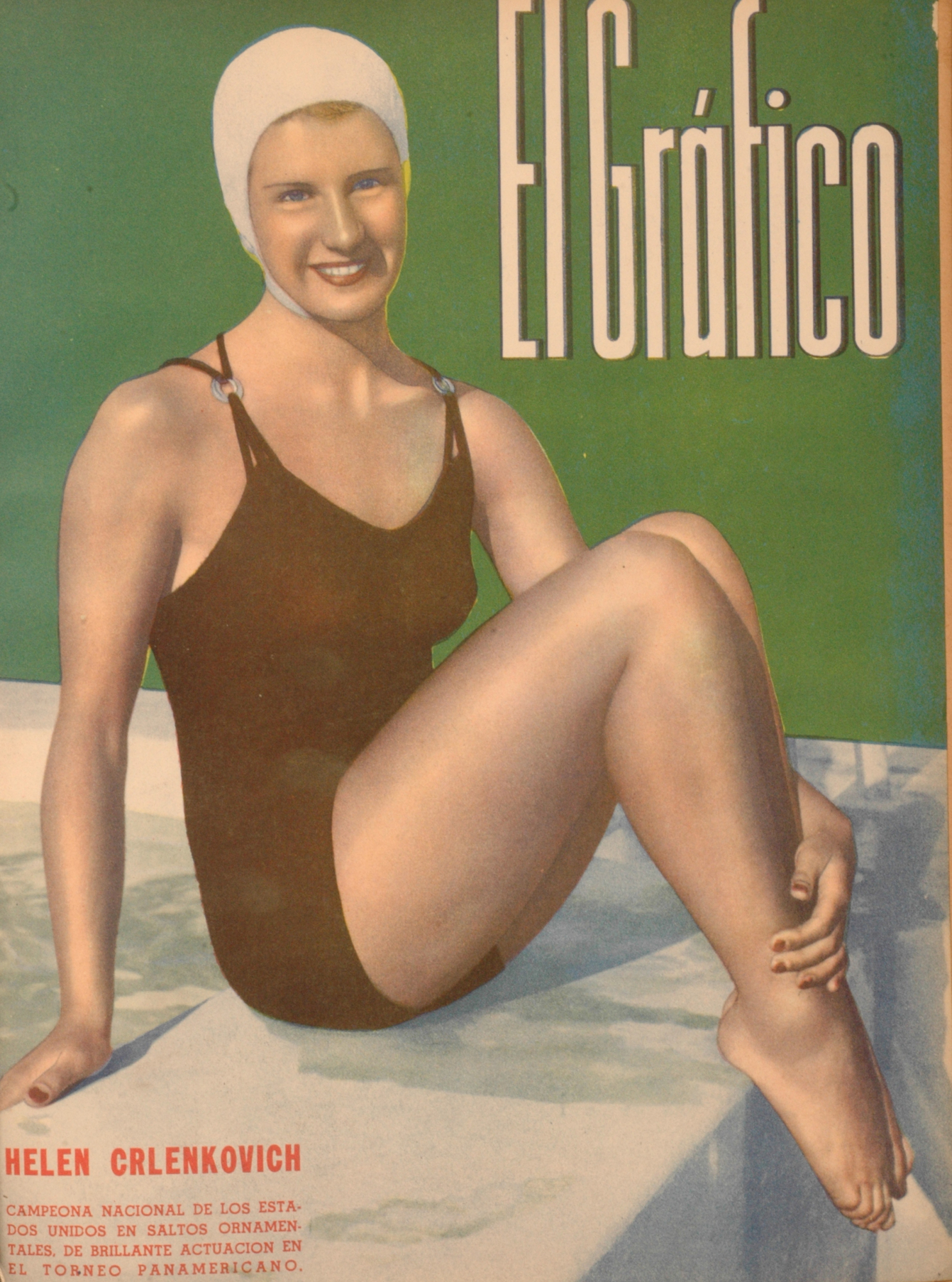
- Helen Crlenkovich - El Gráfico

Personal information
- Nickname: "Klinky"
- Born: Helen Crlenkovich; January 14, 1921 Akron, Ohio
- Died: July 19, 1955 (aged 34) Los Angeles, California
- Height: 5 ft 4 in (163 cm)
- Weight: 121 lb (55 kg)
- Spouse(s): Robert Drew "Bob" Morgan (m.1943–55, her death)

Sport
- Sport: diving
- Updated on 7 July 2017

Helen Crlenkovich (Croatian: Crljenković) (Akron, Ohio, January 14, 1921 – Los Angeles, California, July 19, 1955) was one of the most successful athletes in America and the world on the three-meter springboard and the ten-meter platform. She was a Croatian American known to friends and family as "Klinky." Both of her parents were from Croatia: mother Anka Tomin was from Petrijevci, and father Adam from Banićevac near Cernik.

== Career ==
Crlenkovich's mother moved to San Francisco in the early 1930s to help Helen realize her dreams to become a swimmer, leaving Helen's sister Kay behind in a New York boarding school. Crlenkovich began participating on the "Fairmont Plunge" swim team at the Fairmont Hotel under the tutelage of Phil Patterson, alongside future swimming and diving stars Ann Curtis, Barbara Jensen, and Patsy Elsener.

Her best sports years began in the late 1930s. In 1937, she was the national junior diving champion. She not only became the best American, but also the world springboard and platform diving champion. She was the first female to perform a full-twisting 1½ somersault, also the 2½ tuck, back 1½ layout, inward 1½ pike and reverse 1½ tuck, dives that were previously only performed by men. In July 1939, Crlenkovich won the national three-meter springboard championship in Des Moines. At the Des Moines meet, Marjorie Gestring won the ten-meter platform diving championship, and Esther Williams, for whom Crlenkovich would later serve as a stunt double, won the 100-meter swimming title.

Helen was chosen to represent America in the 1940 Olympic Games. All concerned felt that Helen would achieve two gold medals as a minimum. However, because of the onset of the Second World War, the games were cancelled. During this period her dominance of the U.S. women's diving nationals was overwhelming. After defeating Hall of Famer Marjorie Gestring in both indoor and outdoor 3m springboard in 1940, Helen went on to win all for 3 years. She declined an offer to turn professional for US$250 (equivalent to $5,610 in 2024) per week in 1940 to dive for Billy Rose's Aquacade at the 1940 Golden Gate International Exposition. Esther Williams, who accepted Rose's offer, went on to be discovered by an MGM scout while swimming in the Aquacade. Crlenkovich won National Amateur Athletic Union (A.A.U.) diving championships each year between 1939 and 1941, declining to defend her title in 1942.

During a World War II retirement "Klinky", as she was affectionately known, swam in the Aqua Follies at the Minneapolis Aquatennial (held July 18–26, 1942), and was married in 1943, becoming Helen Morgan. She came back to competitive diving in 1945 to win both springboard and tower, and later won the National A.A.U. title for the three-meter springboard again in 1946 and 1947. She also turned pro to dive in Larry Crosby's Aqua Follies and Buster Crabbe's well traveled Aqua Parade from 1945 to 1950.

=== Legacy ===
Crlenkovich appears twice as a twisting diver above San Francisco Bay in Diego Rivera's 1940 mural Pan American Unity. She was honored by being inducted into the International Swimming Hall of Fame in 1981, the Helms Diving Hall of Fame and the San Francisco Prep Hall of Fame. She won more consistently and by greater margins than any woman diver. Along with Georgia Coleman, Pat McCormick and Micki King, all Hall of Famers, she has been closer to the men's standards of diving excellence than any of the other great women in history. In September 2008, Helen received posthumous recognition by the World Acrobatic Congress held in Las Vegas for her life achievements in swimming and diving. In October 2022, she was inaugurated in the Croatian-American Sports Hall of Fame.

== Personal life ==
Crlenkovich attended San Francisco Junior College with a major in physical education (previously pre-law) while working nights as a hotel accountant and practicing dives for two hours a day. In her spare time, she obtained a pilot's license on January 20, 1941 after signing up for pilot training in 1939. She married Ensign Robert "Bob" Morgan on February 13, 1943, in Coronado, California. Together they had a daughter, Bari Lee (born 1947).

Crlenkovich died of cancer in 1955 after a long illness. Bob Morgan, then working as an actor and stuntman, would go on to marry Yvonne De Carlo after Crlenkovich's death. Bari Lee is a noted photographer who has also been responsible for directing the Santa Cruz Follies.

== See also ==
- Aquatic House Party, a 1949 Oscar-winning short film that features Crlenkovich (billed under her married name as "Helen Morgan") performing a dive
- List of members of the International Swimming Hall of Fame
