= Golden Gate (train) =

Santa Fe Railway passenger service

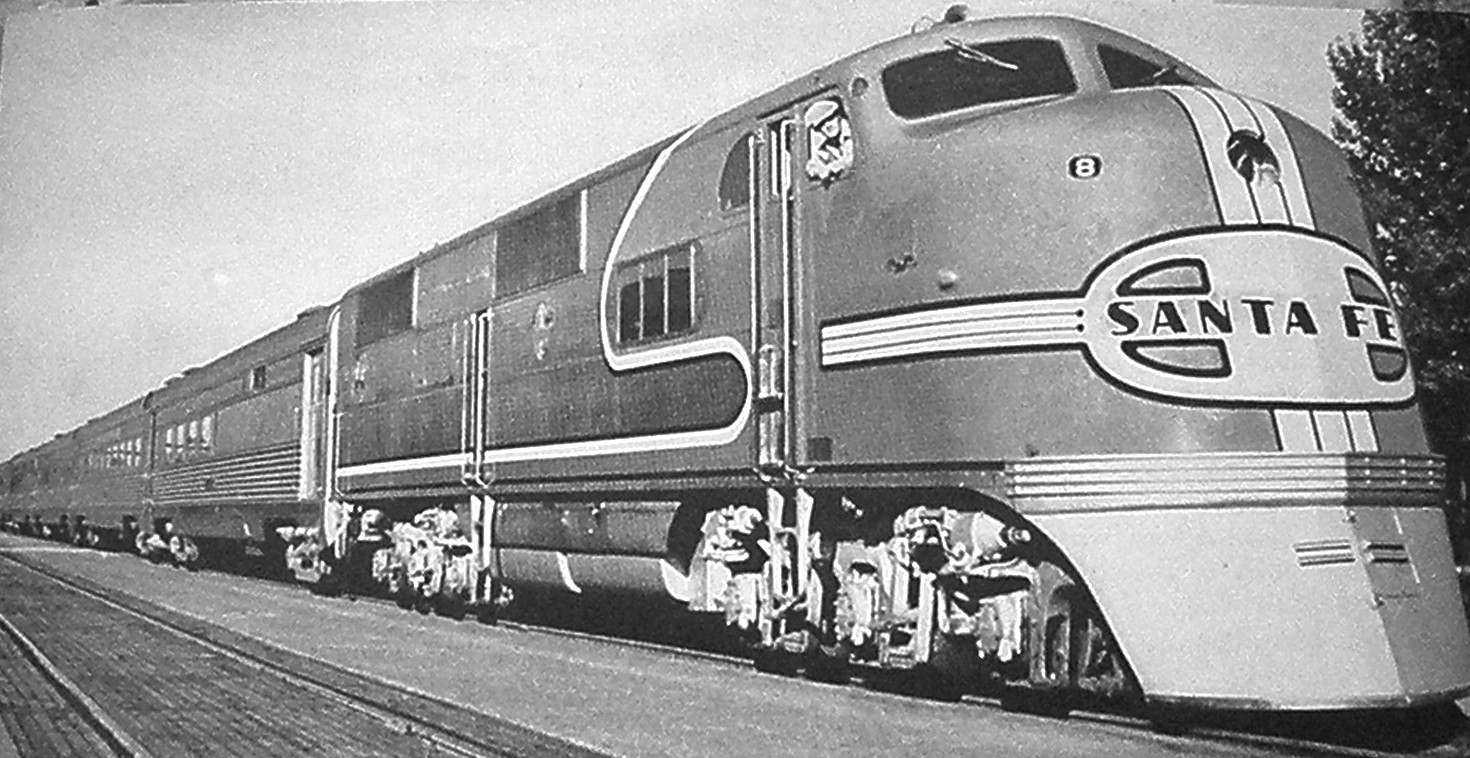
- The Golden Gate c. 1938

Overview
- Service type: Inter-city rail
- Locale: California
- First service: July 1, 1938
- Last service: April 28, 1968
- Successor: San Joaquins
- Former operator: Atchison, Topeka and Santa Fe Railway

Route
- Termini: Oakland; Bakersfield
- Stops: 7
- Average journey time: 9 hours 25 minutes
- Service frequency: Daily
- Train number: 60/61/62/63

On-board services
- Seating arrangements: Chair cars
- Catering facilities: Lunch-counter dining car
- Baggage facilities: Baggage car

Technical
- Track gauge: 4 ft 8 1/2 in (1,435 mm)
- Operating speed: 53.3 mph (85.8 km/h)

The Golden Gate was one of the named passenger trains of the Atchison, Topeka and Santa Fe Railway (Santa Fe). It ran on the railroad's Valley Division between Oakland and Bakersfield, California; its bus connections provided service between San Francisco and Los Angeles via California's San Joaquin Valley.

== History ==
In 1911, the Santa Fe tried to compete with Southern Pacific Railroad (SP) with overnight trains that included cars to and from San Diego, the Saint train to San Francisco and the Angel train to Los Angeles. The Santa Fe route via San Bernardino and Barstow was longer than the SP route via Glendale and Lancaster and the San Francisco to Los Angeles schedule was 16 hours 45 minutes, compared to 14:45 for SP's Owl and 13:45 for the Lark. The Saint and Angel were withdrawn in 1918. Although rumors soon flew of their return, Santa Fe later cited competition by bus services as preventing restoration of the Saint and Angel schedules.

In 1936 the completion of improvements on the Ridge Route highway south of Bakersfield and the San Francisco-Oakland Bay Bridge gave the Santa Fe an opportunity to compete with the SP with faster service. The lightweight Golden Gate streamliners were assigned Nos. 60–63 and ran daily between Oakland (station was actually in Emeryville) and Bakersfield. Santa Fe buses connected San Francisco across the San Francisco–Oakland Bay Bridge to Oakland and between Bakersfield and Los Angeles, most with stops at North Hollywood and Hollywood and some with stops at Burbank, Glendale, and Pasadena. The Oakland transfer point moved to Richmond in 1958 with buses making stops at Oakland and Berkeley.

A competitor to the Southern Pacific Railroad's San Joaquin Daylight, the Golden Gate's scheduled 9-hour and 25-minute time bested that of the Daylight. After a series of hearings and legal challenges, as well as public displays of the new rolling stock, the new six-car consists entered service on July 1, 1938. Coach fares were $6.00 one-way, $10.80 round-trip, rates that were matched by the SP. San Francisco to Los Angeles was 312.8 rail miles (503.4 km) plus 112 bus miles (180 km).

In early 1939, the Golden Gate was involved in what was believed to be the first collision between a modern streamlined train and an automobile when it was struck by a car in Richmond. In 1939 another train, the Valley Flyer, was added to the Bakersfield-Oakland route to carry passengers to the Golden Gate International Exposition. In 1940 the Exposition ended and this train moved to the San Diego to Los Angeles route.

Citing losses of up to $421,000 in 1963 (equivalent to $4,427,364 in 2025), the Santa Fe applied to discontinue the Golden Gate. The California Public Utilities Commission held hearings on the discontinuance of the service in 1964 and authorized discontinuance of the service in March 1965 stating that "the public reaction [to discontinuing the service] was apathetic to say the least." Yet just seven years earlier in 1957, passenger feedback was cited as the reason to adjust the Golden Gate timetable about one hour earlier in the day. The Golden Gate was all but eliminated on April 11, 1965, though No. 62 was reassigned as No. 8 and took over the duties of the southbound Fast Mail Express. That service ended April 28, 1968. Since 1974 Amtrak California's San Joaquin (later renamed Gold Runner) runs the same route from Port Chicago to Bakersfield.

=== Timeline ===
- January 20, 1912: The Santa Fe begins service between Los Angeles and San Francisco via Barstow and Bakersfield with overnight trains with through cars from/to San Diego, the Saint northbound and the Angel southbound.
- December 31, 1918: The Saint and the Angel are discontinued.
- October 8, 1935: The Santa Fe applies for permission from the Railroad Commission of the State of California to operate "one-ticket, point-to-point, streamlined train service" between San Francisco and Bakersfield, with coordinated motor coach (bus) service extending the route south to Los Angeles.
- November 12, 1936: The San Francisco – Oakland Bay Bridge opens.
- July 1, 1938: Santa Fe's coordinated rail-bus service starts.
- June 11, 1939: The Valley Flyer is added to the route to serve the Golden Gate International Exposition.
- 1940: The Golden Gate consists expand to seven cars with the addition of two "chair" cars.
- 1940-1941 Valley Flyer reassigned to service between San Diego and Los Angeles.
- 1942: Consist expands to 7 cars, and each logs 626 daily miles (1,007 km).
- July 1949: Valley-type 6-6-4 sleeping cars are added to train Nos. 60 and 61.
- 1957: Train Nos. 62 and 63 add railway post office cars to their consists.
- 1958: round-end observation cars are discontinued.
- February 2, 1958: Train No. 61 is withdrawn from service.
- June 15, 1958: rail service is cut back from Oakland to Richmond.
- April 11, 1965: Train Nos. 60 and 63 are withdrawn and No. 62 is redesignated as No. 8.
- April 28, 1968: The Golden Gate makes its last run.

== Equipment used ==
Initial Golden Gate consists (two lightweight trainsets), July 1938:

- EMC E1A Locomotive #8L–#9L
- Baggage-"Chair" car / Coach with newsstand (36 seats) #3490–#3491
- "Chair" car / Coach (52 seats) #3115–#3116
- Club-Lounge-"Chair" car / Coach (26 seats) #3117–#3118
- Fred Harvey Company Lunch Counter Diner-Lounge #1501–#1502
- Round-end Parlor-Lounge-Observation (34 seats) #3243–3244

The Golden Gate consists (two trainsets) as of March 1948:

- EMC E1A Locomotive #3LA, #4LA, #5L, #7L–#9L (shared power with the San Diegan)
- Baggage-"Chair" car / Coach with newsstand (36 seats) #3490–#3491
- "Chair" car / Coach (52 seats) #3070–#3116, #3119, #3137–#3166
- "Chair" car / Coach (52 seats) #3070–#3116, #3119, #3137–#3166
- "Chair" car / Lounge #3117–#3118
- Fred Harvey Company Lunch Counter Diner #1500–#1507
- "Chair" car / Coach (52 seats) #3070–#3116, #3119, #3137–#3166
- Leg Rest "Chair" car / Coach (44 seats)* #2861–#2911
- Sleeper Valley-type (6 sections, 6 roomettes, 4 bedrooms)
- Round-end "Chair" car / Coach-Observation (58 seats) #3243–3244

*Extra car added between Chicago and Oakland during the summer months.

Golden Gate consists in 1958:

- ALCO PA/PB #51LAC or
- EMD F-unit 300-series LAB sets

Nos. 60–63

- any lightweight Baggage
- "Chair" car / Coach (52 seats) #3070–#3101, #3108, #3111, #3115, #3119, #3144–#3158
- "Chair" car / Coach (52 seats) #3070–#3101, #3108, #3111, #3115, #3119, #3144–#3158
- Bar-Lounge #1388–#1399, #1346–#1349
- Fred Harvey Company Lunch Counter (Diner) #1500, #1503–#1507
- "Chair" car / Coach (52 seats) #3070–#3101, #3108, #3111, #3115, #3119, #3144–#3158
- "Chair" car / Coach (52 seats) #3070–#3101, #3108, #3111, #3115, #3119, #3144–#3158

No. 62 only

- Railway Post Office-Baggage #3402–#3408, #3600–#3606
- any lightweight Baggage
- "Chair" car / Coach (52 seats) #3070–#3101, #3108, #3111, #3115, #3119, #3144–#3158
- "Chair" car / Coach (52 seats) #3070–#3101, #3108, #3111, #3115, #3119, #3144–#3158
- Bar-Lounge #1388–#1399, #1346–#1349
- Fred Harvey Company Lunch Counter (Diner) #1500, #1503–#1507
- "Chair" car / Coach (52 seats) #3070–#3101, #3108, #3111, #3115, #3119, #3144–#3158
- "Chair" car / Coach (52 seats) #3070–#3101, #3108, #3111, #3115, #3119, #3144–#3158

In May 1960 two-unit ALCO PA sets replaced the F-units. Car #1346 was converted to a "Vend-O-Lounge" vending machine car in May 1964 (operated by the Harvey Company), though it failed to gain acceptance and was replaced with a 1500-series Lunch Counter Diner the following September.

== See also ==
- Passenger train service on the Atchison, Topeka and Santa Fe Railway
- Gold Runner: Amtrak route that partly runs along the route of the Golden Gate.
