= Art in Action =

Coordinates: 37.8242°N 122.3710°W

Art in Action at the Golden Gate International Exposition. "The Pit" with its many artists is at floor level and Herman Volz's mosaic is on the opposite wall. LIFE photographer Peter Stackpole climbed up Diego Rivera's scaffold to take this shot

Art in Action was an exhibit of artists at work displayed for four months in the summer of 1940 at the Golden Gate International Exposition (GGIE) held on Treasure Island. Many famous artists took part in the exhibit, including Dudley C. Carter, woodcarver and Diego Rivera, muralist. Rivera painted his monumental work Pan American Unity at Art in Action.

== Origins ==
During the first year of the Exposition, the investors failed to make a profit and the GGIE committee decided to extend the fair for one more year. The exhibition's second season ran from May 25, 1940, through September 29, 1940, and featured lower ticket prices and a collection of new attractions. Art in Action opened on June 1, a week after the main Exposition, and closed at the same time as the rest of the Exposition.

Timothy L. Pflueger, architect and member of the GGIE design committee, came up with a plan to have an exhibition of artists on display. He selected Helen Bruton, an artist from Alameda, California, to be in charge of the program. She was assisted by Beatrice Judd Ryan, a local art dealer and curator, who was hired as the State Director of Exhibitions. They contacted a wide array of artists to show their talents to the public while working within the "Fine Arts Palace", a concrete and steel industrial building measuring 335 by 78 feet intended to be an aircraft hangar after the Exposition closed. For the second time, Pflueger brought Rivera to San Francisco to paint a mural, this time as the main attraction at Art in Action.

Alfred Frankenstein of the New York Times reported from the opening day and wrote "Here the visitor is privileged to observe a kind of twenty-ring circus of art... On the floor, in a series of little ateliers, sculptors, painters, lithographers, etchers, ceramicists, weavers and whatnot are at work under the direct observation of the public." On July 29, 1940, LIFE magazine ran a story about Art in Action using a spread of color photos.

Along one wall, Rivera painted the mural Pan American Unity on ten steel-framed panels spanning 74 feet in width and reaching 22 feet in height, weighing a total of 23 tons.

Some 68 artists had participated by the end of September when the Exposition was closed. Rivera was not finished, however; he and two assistants labored for two more months in the empty exhibit hall. On Friday, November 30 and Sunday, December 2, 30,000–35,000 visitors came to Treasure Island to view the completed mural. During the painting of the mural, Frida Kahlo had arrived in San Francisco and on December 8, 1940, Rivera's 54th birthday, Kahlo and Rivera were married for the second time in a civil ceremony at San Francisco City Hall.

After the Exposition, many of the larger artworks remained in the building in temporary storage. Most of these ended up at San Francisco City College in their permanent collection, including Dudley C. Carter's Bighorn Mountain Ram which became the school's mascot.

== Artists ==
Artists that participated in the Art in Action exhibition.

- Diego Rivera, muralist: Pan American Unity
  - Mona Hoffman, assistant muralist
  - Emmy Lou Packard, assistant muralist
  - Arthur Niendorff, assistant muralist
- Dudley C. Carter, woodcarver: Goddess of the Forest, Bighorn Mountain Ram
- Frederick E. Olmsted, sculptor: Leonardo da Vinci, bust in limestone
- Beniamino Bufano, sculptor: St. Francis in the California Hall
- Ruth Cravath, sculptor: horse's head in marble
- Herman Volz, painter, lithographer, ceramicist: Organic and Inorganic Science, large scale low-relief marble mosaic and two large, painted murals called, The Conquest of the West (By Land, By Sea) which required around 10 assistants.
  - Juan Breda, assistant mosaicist
  - Robert P. McChesney, mural assistant
  - Jose Ramis, mural assistant
  - John Saccaro, mural assistant
  - John Thomas Hayes (Tom Hayes), mural assistant
  - Carlton Williams, mural assistant
  - Peter Lowe, mural assistant
  - Percy Freer, mural assistant
  - Alden Clark, mural assistant
  - Ernest Lenshaw, mural assistant
- Cecilia Bancroft Graham, sculptor: clay bas-relief
- Pauline Ivancovich Teller, woodcarver: redwood relief carvings
- Helen Forbes: portraits, including one of Pauline Ivancovich Teller
- Jean Varda, painter
- Elizabeth Ginno: some 75 etchings of costumed foreign visitors

Other fine artists that participated at the Golden Gate International Exposition (GGIE)

- Miguel Covarrubias, muralist: The set of murals of illustrated maps entitled The Fauna and Flora of the Pacific, Peoples, Art and Culture, Economy, Native Dwellings, and Native Means of Transportation.
- Vivika Heino, ceramics
- Allan Houser, muralist
- Dorothy Rieber Joralemon, sculpture
- David Klein, painter
- Xavier Martínez, painter: Portrait of Elsie
- Ralph Stackpole, sculpture and muralist: Pacifica statue

== See also ==
- City College of San Francisco (CCSF), the current location of much of the art from Art in Action
- Golden Gate International Exposition (GGIE)
- Panama–Pacific International Exposition (1915 San Francisco World's Fair)
- 1939 New York World's Fair
- Elmer Keeton
