= Valley Flyer (ATSF train) =

Former Oakland-Bakersfield passenger train

Overview
- Service type: Inter-city rail
- Status: Discontinued
- Locale: California
- First service: June 11, 1939
- Last service: October 27, 1941
- Successor: equipment reassigned to the San Diegan
- Former operator: Atchison, Topeka and Santa Fe Railway

Route
- Termini: Bakersfield, California; Oakland, California

The Valley Flyer was a short-lived named passenger train of the Atchison, Topeka and Santa Fe Railway in the United States. The all-heavyweight, "semi-streamlined" train ran between Bakersfield and Oakland, California (through California's San Joaquin Valley on the railway's Valley Division, hence the name) during the 1939–1940 Golden Gate International Exposition on Treasure Island in San Francisco Bay. Motive power was two Baldwin-built 1300 class 4-6-2 "Pacific" locomotives refurbished and decorated for the train. It was the Santa Fe's first attempt at streamlining older steam power.

== History ==
The first run was on June 11, 1939. The train left Bakersfield daily at 6:30 a.m. PST and arrived in Oakland at 12:35 p.m., then returned at 1:55 p.m., pulling into Bakersfield at 8:00 p.m. Beginning on October 27, 1941, the Flyer cars (save for the lounge car) were used to transport troops as a section of the San Diegan on the Santa Fe's "Surf Line" between Los Angeles and San Diego. In 1942 the trainset was discontinued and the passenger cars returned to pool service, repainted Coach Green.

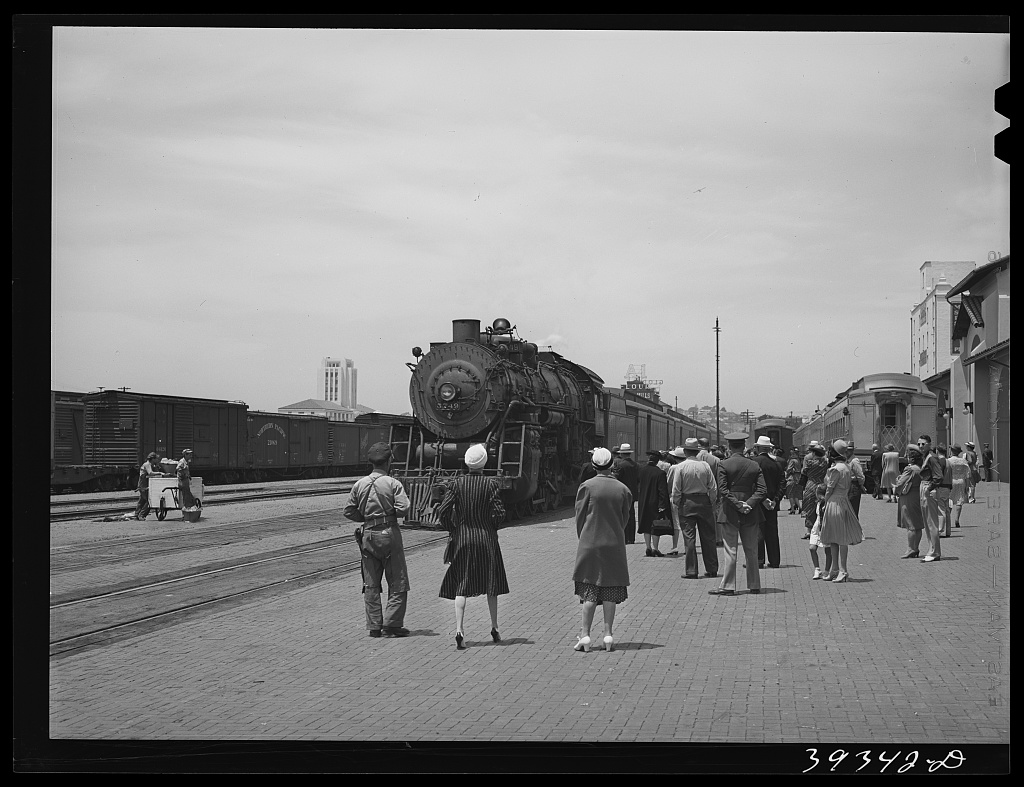
The platform at San Diego in the early days of World War II. The Valley Flyer cars, on train 70, the northbound San Diegan, are at right

The 1337 class 4-6-2 pacifics #1369 and #1376 were de-streamlined and served the Santa Fe until the early 1950s with #1376 being scrapped in 1950, #1369 heading off to the scrapyard in 1951, all of the 1337 class was scrapped by 1954.

== Rolling stock ==
The locomotives had metal skirting along the sides, painted aluminum (as were the nose and smokestack) with red and yellow stripes, these being outlined by black pinstripes; the tenders were similarly decorated. A yellow "Circle and Cross" emblem backed by red "wings" was emblazoned across the front of the locomotive above the pilot deck, and on each side of the tender, which also featured a red "wing." The air-conditioned rolling stock was painted aluminum with red and yellow stripes along their sills, bordered with black pinstripes (somewhat like Santa Fe's passenger diesel locomotives). Stripes on the combine unit split into two sets, with one set sweeping up to align with those on the locomotive tenders. Window shades were painted matte aluminum. The sides of the passenger cars bore "SANTA FE" in black, extra extended Railroad Roman letters. The design of the Valley Flyer's drumhead was inspired by that of its counterpart, the Golden Gate.

=== Consist ===
- Baldwin 4-6-2 Pacific #1369. Built in April 1913 (serial number 39566). Streamlined in 1939. Streamlining removed in 1942. #1369 was built as a four-cylinder balanced compound for mountain passenger service and rebuilt into a two-cylinder simple engine in November 1923 at the San Bernardino shops. It retained 73-inch drivers, however increased steam pressure raised tractive force from 33,400 to 39,650 pounds. Sold for scrap on November 6, 1951.
- Baldwin 4-6-2 Pacific #1376. Built in April 1913 (serial number 39573). Streamlined in 1939. Streamlining removed in 1942. Like her sister #1369, #1376 was also built as a 4-cylinder locomotive. Converted into a simple 2-cylinder locomotive in September of 1926, also at the road's San Bernardino facility. Sold for scrap on August 22, 1950.
- Combine Baggage-Barbershop-Buffet-Library #1302
- Lounge #1367
- Fred Harvey Company Diner #1467
- "Chair" car / Coach #3002
- "Chair" car / Coach #3005
- "Chair" car / Coach #3006

== See also ==
- Passenger train service on the Atchison, Topeka and Santa Fe Railway
- The Golden Gate, another Oakland-Bakersfield train operated by the ATSF at the same time.
- The San Joaquin Daylight, an Oakland-Los Angeles train operated by the ATSF's historical competitor, Southern Pacific Railroad.
- Gold Runner current Amtrak passenger service from Bakersfield to Oakland.
