= Mardonio Magaña =

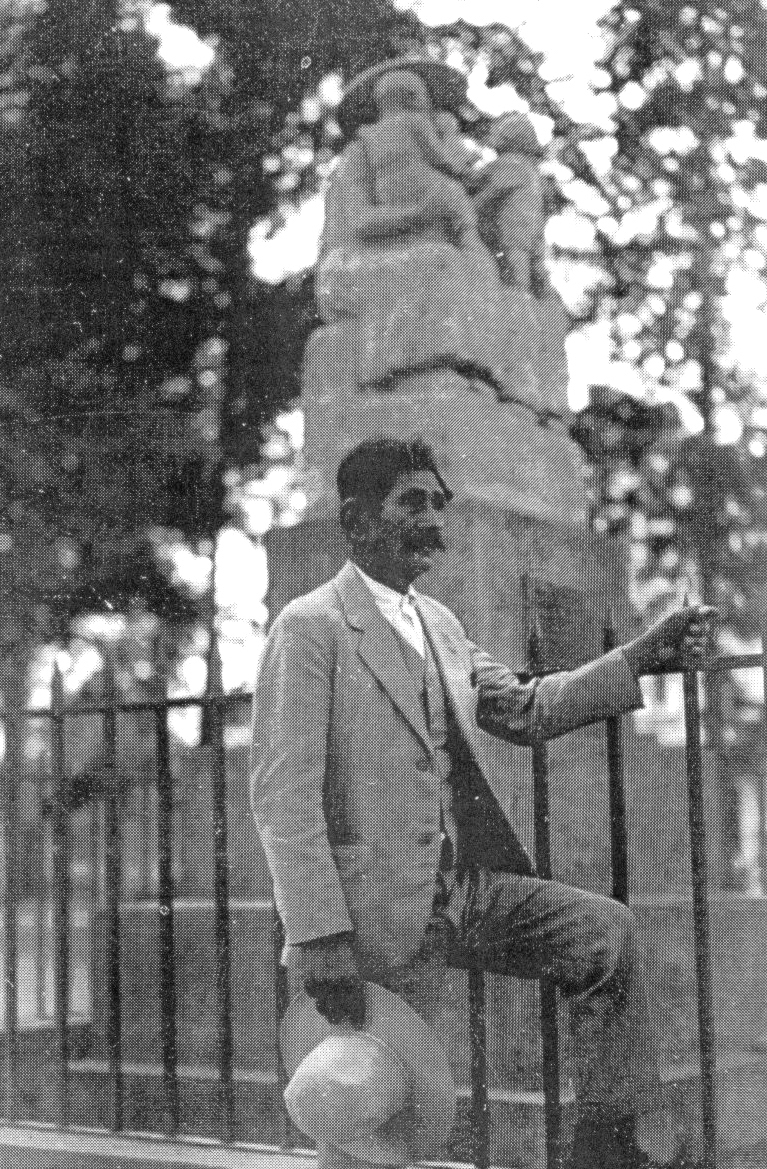
- Born: Mardonio Magaña-Camacho c.1865 Guanajuato, Mexico
- Died: 1947; Mexico City, Mexico
- Known for: wooden direct carved sculptures
- Style: contemporary Mexican folk art

Mardonio Magaña-Camacho (c.1865–1947) also known as Magañita, was a Mexican educator and sculptor known for his folk art stone direct carvings, he was also known to work with wood and mud. He was a self-taught artist inspired by nature, who was "discovered" by artist Diego Rivera. It's said that Diego Rivera was quoted as saying Magaña was, "the greatest contemporary Mexican sculptor".

== Biography ==
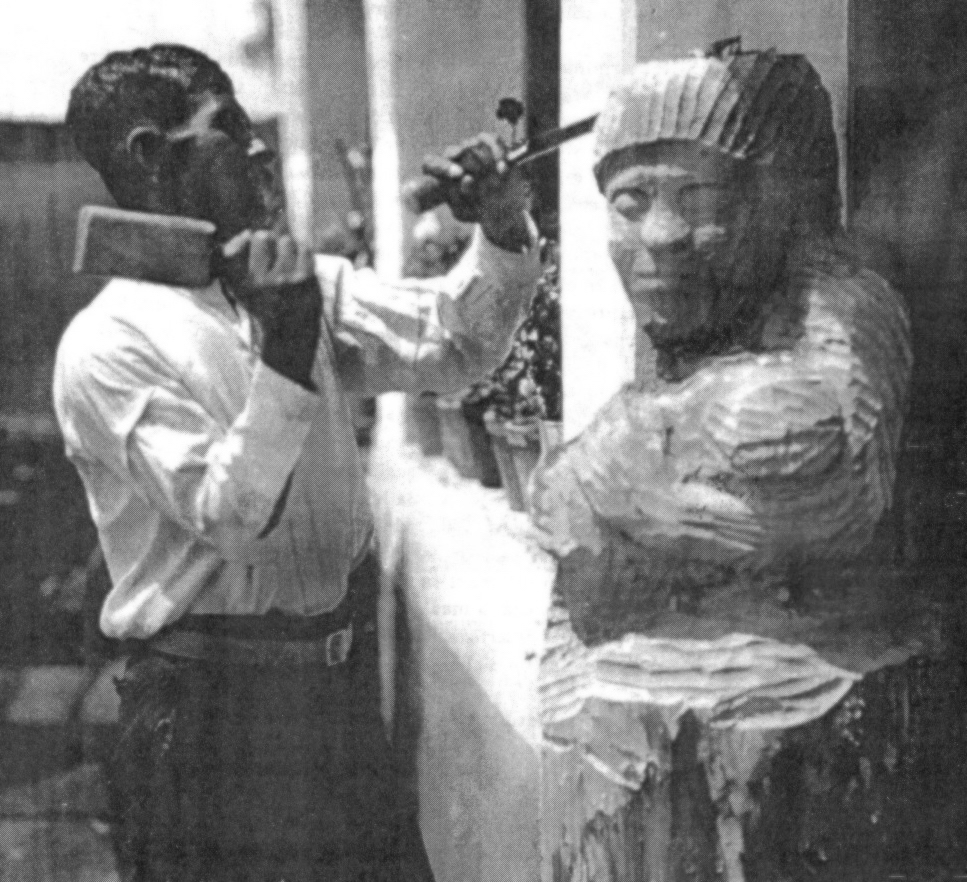
Mardonio Magaña sculpting in wood with hammer and chisel

Born between 1865 and 1866 in La Estancia Nueva, Guanajuato, Mexico to a peasant family, the son of Dolores Camacho and Jacinto Magaña. He spend most of his life working as a foreman at the property of Don Vincente Silva in his hometown. At age 52, after the devastation left by the Mexican Revolution he moved to the capital, Mexico City, to find work. And in 1921, while working at an art school called Escuela de Pintura al Aire Libre de Coyoacán (English: School of Outdoor Painting in Coyoacán) as a janitor, he started creating sculptures. Between 1925 and 1928 he became a general caretaker for the school and by 1929 he was promoted to professor of sculputure. Throughout the 1930s he held various teaching positions in Mexico.

Magaña's artwork is included in museum and private art collections internationally some of which are; Philadelphia Museum of Art, Museum of Modern Art (MoMA), National Museum of Mexican Art, the Nelson A. Rockefeller Collection, and Frida Kahlo Museum.

Magaña's portrait was painted by Diego Rivera in his large mural Pan American Unity (1940) and can be seen at the City College of San Francisco, where the mural is now located.
