= St. Dunstan's Church of the Highlands Parish, Shoreline, Washington =

Coordinates: 47°44′05″N 122°20′58″W

Saint Dunstan's Church of the Highlands Parish is an Episcopal congregation of over 250 people in the Diocese of Olympia. The main church is located on the city limits between Seattle and Shoreline, Washington. Parishioners primarily come from the northern Seattle, Shoreline, Edmonds, and Mountlake Terrace. Some come from as far away as Bellevue, Mill Creek, and Everett. On the parish grounds is a carving of Chief Spokan Garry by Dudley C. Carter and a Celtic cross over the porch created by Lycia Danielle Trounton.

== History of Saint Dunstan's Parish ==
The Florence Henry Memorial Chapel in The Highlands, Shoreline, Washington, on a foggy day in the Fall.

=== Formation of congregation ===
Regular services began for what was to become Saint Dunstan's in the Florience Henry Memorial Chapel in The Highlands gated community in 1949. The congregation grew rapidly and was officially organized in 1951 as a mission of the Diocese of Olympia. Technically, a mission is a developing congregation, led by a vicar appointed by the Bishop and not necessarily self-sufficient. During its mission years, the congregation took the title "The Highlands Congregation."

=== Growth and change from a mission congregation to parish status ===
Rapid growth led to the acquisition of the property at 722 North 145th Street and the construction of the present building in 1959-1960. This building was originally called "Saint Dunstan's Hall." When the congregation was incorporated in March 1962 becoming a parish of the diocese, the legal title "St. Dunstan's Church of the Highlands Parish" was selected, a reference to its origins and to the fact that at that time, at least 40% of the members still attended services in the Henry Chapel.

Saint Dunstan's Church in Shoreline, Washington, in the Spring.

=== The parish today ===
Now, the Sunday morning "low mass," using either the 1928 Book of Common Prayer or Holy Communion: Rite I from the current Book of Common Prayer, is at the Henry Chapel. The principal Sunday service, using Holy Communion: Rite II, is at what is now "Saint Dunstan's Church."

==== Parish Numbers ====
These are numbers from the 2005 Parochial Report:

- Members of the parish (16 and older)—257
- Members of the parish (under 16)—48
- Average Sunday attendance—127 (both services combined)
- Marriages—6
- Burials—8
- Baptisms—2
- Celebrations of the Holy Eucharist (Sundays)—107
- Celebrations of the Holy Eucharist (weekdays)—74

== Artwork at Saint Dunstan's Church ==
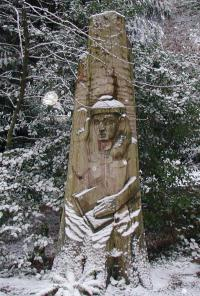
Carving of Chief Spokan Garry by Dudley C. Carter

=== Carving of Chief Spokan Garry ===
In 1961 artist Dudley C. Carter (1891–1992) created the carving of Chief Spokan Garry at Saint Dunstan's Church from a dead tree on the property. This followed the publication in 1960 of Chief Spokan Garry (T. S. Denison & Company, Inc., Minneapolis) by the Rev. Canon Thomas E. Jesset, who was vicar of what was then a mission congregation of the diocese.

The carving shows Spokan Garry holding a Book of Common Prayer on his lap while offering a sign of peace. The carving is on the wooded path between the upper and lower parking lots, near the columbarium.

Spokan Garry brought an Anglican form of Christianity to the Middle Spokanes after attending a school ran by the Church Missionary Society of the Anglican Church at Fort Garry (Winnipeg), Manitoba. Later in life Spokan Gary became the central speaker for the Spokane, Coeur d'Alene, and Colville nations when negotiating with territorial Governor Isaac I. Stevens. In these dealings, Spokan Garry wanted peace, not war.

Celtic cross before it was mounted over the porch

Dudley Carter became the first King County Parks and Recreation artist in residence when he was 96 years old. There are numerous works by Carter in the metropolitan Seattle area, particularly in Bellevue and Redmond. His home at 7747 159th Place Northeast, Redmond, has become an historic site and park ("Haida House Studio"). In addition to his Seattle area carvings, Carter has "The Ram" and "Goddess of the Forest" at the City College of San Francisco.

=== Celtic cross over porch ===
The artist, Lycia Danielle Trounton, created a Celtic cross design to bring out these aspects of Dunstan's life: (1) musician, (2) illustrator or illuminator of manuscripts, and (3) metalworker, blacksmith or farrier (a person who shoes horses). Then, these ideas were complemented with a central image of the Holy Spirit as a dove. The picture of the cross before mounting shows the imagery used clearly.

The knot-work spans the length of the cross. Celtic knot-work is timeless and is generally considered the interconnectedness of, and eternal quality of, all life. The Celtic cross was a form which would normally be encountered in an outdoor setting in stone, as in a traditional church burial yard in Ireland. Some of the textual and patina qualities in bronze were developed to evoke this feeling.

The cross was mounted over the front entry porch.

== Parish Logo ==
Logo for Saint Dunstan's Church of the Highlands Parish, Shoreline, Washington

The logo used by Saint Dunstan's Parish was designed for the 1000th anniversary of Dunstan, and distributed to parishes bearing his name. The four quadrants emphasize four aspects of Dunstan's life:

- Top left corner: Pallium. This vestment is shown in the coat of arms of the Archbishop of Canterbury.
- Top right corner: Chalice. This is used on the altar for wine for the Holy Eucharist.
- Lower left corner: Crosier. This is used by bishops as a symbol of their office.
- Lower right corner: Tongs. This tool is used by metalworkers.

== Parish Organ ==
The pipe organ at St. Dunstan's Church began life as a 2-manual, 18-rank, instrument built by the Boston firm of Hutchings-Votey Organ Co. as their Opus 1642 in 1902 for Temple de Hirsch in Seattle, Washington. When that congregation built a new edifice in 1960, the Seattle firm of Balcom and Vaughan was selected to move, rebuild, and reinstall the organ as their Opus 680. A new console and new Kilgen-style electro-pneumatic windchests were built. The Hutchings-Votey windchests were used in a Balcom and Vaughan project in Tacoma, Washington. The disposition of the Hutchings-Votey console is not known. The transplanted organ was 17 ranks. In the 1970s, Temple de Hirsch elected to replace the pipe organ with an electronic Allen organ. St. Dunstan's then purchased the used Hutchings-Votey / Balcom and Vaughan and reinstalled it in the church with the Great division exposed on two electro-mechanical windchests on the front wall, and the original 1960 Balcom and Vaughan Kilgen-style chests in the Swell division in chambers behind the Great. Tonal changes were made with the existing pipework. The organ continues to serve the parish with a few minor tonal changes.
