= Dudley C. Carter =

American artist

- Born: Dudley Christopher Carter; May 6, 1891; New Westminster, British Columbia, Canada
- Died: April 7, 1992 (aged 100); Redmond, Washington, U.S.
- Burial place: Hatzic Cemetery, Hatzic, British Columbia, Canada
- Other name: Dudley Carter
- Occupations: Artist, sculptor, woodcarver
- Spouse: Teresa Williams Easthope (married in 1919)
- Children: 1

Dudley Christopher Carter (May 6, 1891 – April 7, 1992) was an artist and woodcarver from the Pacific Northwest. His works are on display in the U.S. states of Washington, Oregon and California. There are also works of his on display in Japan and Germany, as well as a private collection in Israel.

Carter was a participant in the "Art in Action" program during the 1940 season of the Golden Gate International Exposition (GGIE). He was also the first King County, Washington Parks and Recreation artist-in-residence when he was 96 years old.

== Early life ==
Carter was born to a pioneer family of Scottish-descent on May 6, 1891, in New Westminster, Canada. His father was originally from Barbados, and his mother was from Quebec; they came west in 1891, shortly before Dudley was born. He was a timber cruiser and forest engineer most of his life, exploring and mapping Pacific Northwest wilderness. The chief inspiration for Carter's art was his childhood among the Kwakiutl and Tlingit indigenous people. He moved to Washington state in 1928.

== Diego Rivera and City College of San Francisco ==
Carter was a participant during 1940, in the "Art in Action" exhibitions during the 1939–1940 Golden Gate International Exposition (GGIE) on Treasure Island. During that time he became a friend of Diego Rivera, who included Carter three separate times in his mural Marriage of the Artistic Expression of the North and of the South on this Continent and once in the Pan American Unity mural. Rivera said the following about Carter:

Here in the Fine Arts Building there is a man carving wood. This man was an engineer, an educated and sophisticated man. He lived with the Indians and then he became an artist, and his art for [sic] was like Indian art—only not the same, but a great deal of Indian feeling had passed into him and it came out in his art. Now, what he carves is not Indian any more, but his own expression—and his own expression now has in it what he has felt, what he has learned from the Indians. That is right, that is the way art should be. First the assimilation and then the expression. Only why do the artists of this continent think that they should always assimilate the art of Europe? They should go to the other Americans for their enrichment, because if they copy Europe it will always be something they cannot feel because after all they are not Europeans.

— Diego Rivera

There are three works by Carter on the City College of San Francisco Ocean Campus, The Ram (sometimes called the Mountain Ram), Goddess of the Forest, and The Beast. Dudley had donated The Ram because he knew it was the school mascot and it had been part of the Golden Gate International Exposition's Arts in Action exhibition. The Ram sculpture stood outside on the campus periodically changing locations from time to time, students would coat it in paint with campus colors red and white. Sometimes rival schools would repaint The Ram in their own school colors. By 1980, The Ram had many layers of paint and damage and in spring of 1983 it was restored by Carter with use of a pick axe and its original, natural redwood. Currently located in the lobby of Conlan Hall, on the Ocean Campus.

The Goddess of the Forest is another redwood sculpture created during GGIE. It is very large, standing at 26 feet tall, and had a girth at the base of 21 feet. For years this piece was located at Golden Gate Park, until 1986, when it began to show distress and decay. It was then moved to CCSF, to an indoor location awaiting restoration.

== Clackamas ==
Signature of Dudley C. Carter on his carving of Chief Spokan Garry

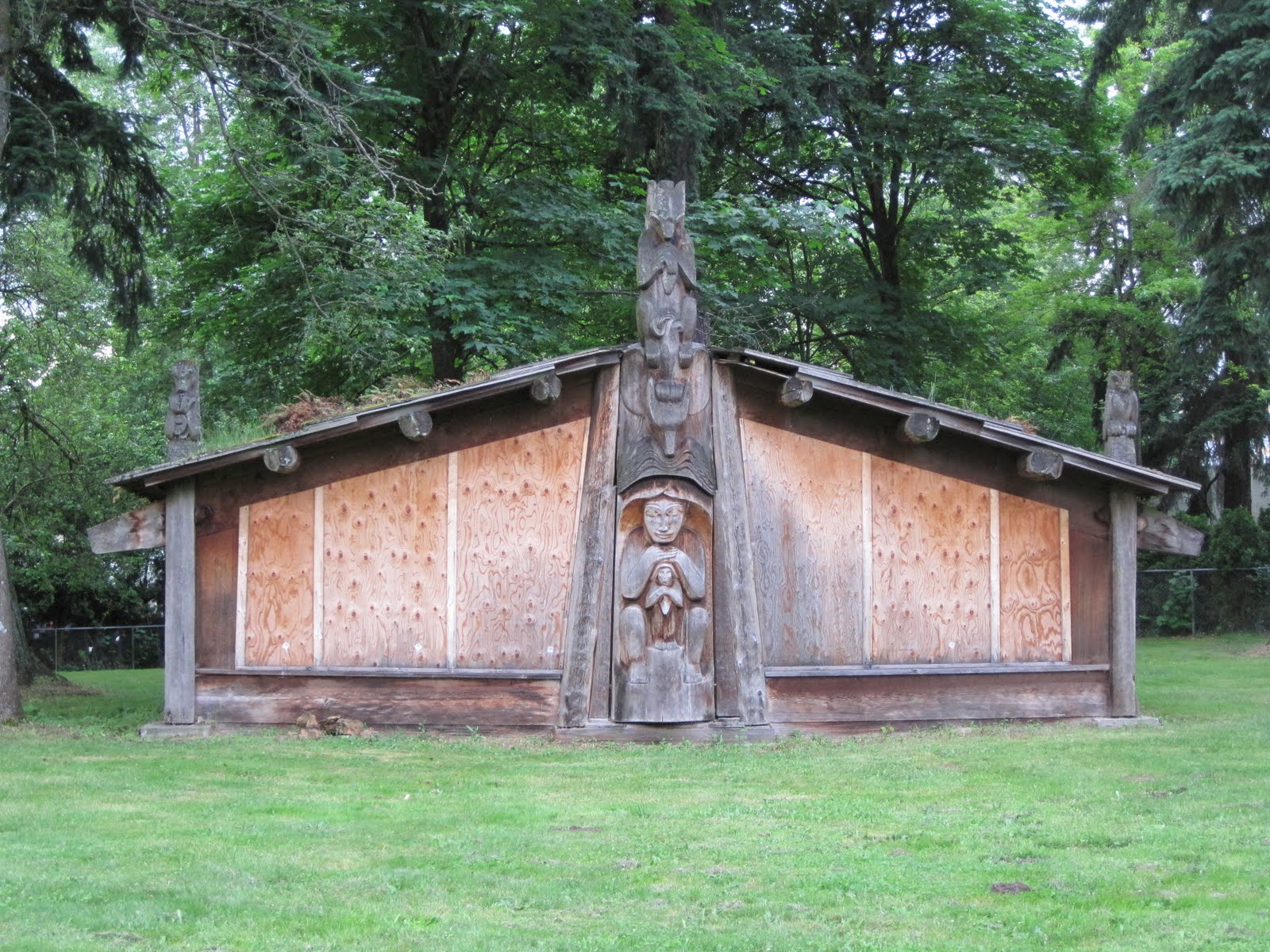
Haida House or Slough House (1935), Redmond, Washington, photo from June 2011

In 1979, at the age of eighty-eight, Carter was commissioned to carve three large cedars for the Clackamas Town Center shopping mall, located in the southeastern part of the Portland metropolitan area in Oregon. The trees selected for the project came from Mount St. Helens six months before the volcanic eruption of 1980 that eliminated much of the forest. Carter lived in a small trailer on the shopping center's construction site while carving the trees. In 1981, the sculptures were moved into the central court next to a skating rink, where they remained until a major remodel of the center in 2004. The next year they were transferred to the Columbia Gorge Interpretive Center Museum.

== Influence in Washington state ==
When ninety-six years old, Carter became the first artist-in-residence of the King County Parks and Recreation Department.

He had a home at 7447 159th Place NE, Redmond, Washington. Located in Slough House Park, the house was named "Haida House Studio".

After a brief illness the artist died in his sleep at the Slough House residence, just a month short of his 101st birthday on April 7, 1992. He is buried near Stave Falls, B.C. Slough House is now owned by the city of Redmond. The artist bequest included his art studio, fashioned in the manner of a native Haida dwelling, and a group of monumental wood sculptures of the sort that brought the sculptor to international prominence.

Upon his death, Congressman Rod Chandler honored Carter with remarks in the Congressional Record in 1992.

On September 8, 2012, the Dudley Carter Park opened at the intersection of Leary Way and 159th Place Northeast.

== Personal life ==
Carter was married to Teresa Williams Carter (née Easthope) in December 20, 1919 in Vancouver, British Columbia. Together they had a daughter named Mavis Anne. Their marriage ended when Teresa Carter died on July 20, 1975, at age 81 in West Vancouver.

== Public works ==
Works by Carter
Year	Title	Image	Location	Notes
	Owl Post	Owl Post	Pet Cemetery in Marymoor Park, Redmond, WA	
	Legend of the Sea	Owl Post	Seattle Children's sculpture garden, Seattle, Washington.	
1932	Rivalry of the Winds	Bird Woman (1932)	Redmond Library, Redmond, Washington	Carved from red cedar. Purchased by the founders of the Seattle Art Museum in 1932 for display in the new museum, later placed outdoors in Volunteer Park, restored and eventually loaned to the Redmond Public Library.
1935	Wek'-Wek and the Holukmeyumko	Wek Wek and the Holukmeyumko (1935)	Pet Cemetery in Marymoor Park, Redmond, WA	Carved from redwood as part of the Golden Gate International Exposition (GGIE). Donated by Marvin Boys to King County Parks' collection. Currently labeled as translation "Wek'-Wek and the Falcon Man".
1935	Condor	Condor (1935)	Marymoor Park, Redmond, WA	
1939	Big Horn Ram		City College of San Francisco, Conlan Hall, San Francisco, California	Carved from redwood as part of the Golden Gate International Exposition (GGIE) and current serves as mascot for City College of San Francisco.
1940	Goddess of the Forest		City College of San Francisco, San Francisco, California	Carved as part of the Golden Gate International Exposition (GGIE), standing at 26 feet tall, and had a girth at the base of 21 feet. This lived in Golden Gate Park for many years prior.
1947	Forest Deity		Bellevue Square Shopping Center, Bellevue, Washington	
1947	Bird Woman	Bird Woman (1947)	Redmond Library, Redmond, Washington	Carved from red cedar. Purchased by the Long Family and on long-term loan to the Redmond Library.
1949	Lake Wilderness Totem		Lake Wilderness Lodge, Maple Valley, Washington	In 1951, Carter designed and carved the central column of the Gaffney's Lodge, now Lake Wilderness Lodge, in Maple Valley, Washington.
1953	Northgate Totem		Suquamish Clearwater Casino Resort, Kitsap County, Washington	A totem pole originally located at the entrance to Northgate Shopping Center, Seattle. Removed from the mall in 2007; extensively restored by the Washington Suquamish tribe and placed on the Suquamish Clearwater Casino Resort grounds in February 2008.
1954	Old Man House Interpretive Center		Old Man House State Park, Suquamish, WA	Designed and constructed by Dudley to mark a site used by the Suquamish tribe for some 2000 years.
1958	Big Horn Head		Bellevue Public Library, Bellevue WA	
c.1960	Faith, Hope, and Love		Bayview Retirement Community, 11 W. Aloha, Queen Anne	Three different works on the entrance wall.
1961	Chief Spokane Garry	Carving of Chief Spokane Garry (1961), photo from 2006	St. Dunstan's Church of the Highlands Parish, Shoreline, Washington	
1960	Desert Scout	Desert Scout	Redmond Library, Redmond, Washington	Carved from redwood at Earl Neel's nursery, Palm Springs, CA. Purchased in 1975 by Allied Stores, acquired in 1995 by Marvin Boys.
1960	Seagull On A Post	Seagull on a Post (1960)	Dudley Carter Park, Redmond, Washington	"Seagull in flight, high atop an upended driftwood log, purchased originally by Boeing executive, Wellwood Beall. Mrs. Beall thought it was out of scale in the swimming pool area of their home where her husband had had it installed. She insisted it "has to go!" So Wellwood sold it to his friend Don McAusland who thought it would be an ideal addition to the landscaping of his downtown Bellevue building. When Mr. McAusland died, his family donated the work to the city of Redmond for installation in Dudley Carter Park." -- Lyn Fleury Lambert, Dudley Carter's secretary and chronicler.
1962	High Mountain Companions	High Mountain Companions (1962)	Dudley Carter Park, Redmond, Washington	Carved from redwood at Earl Neel's nursery in Palm Springs, CA. Loaned by Marvin Boys.
1974	Birds and Waterfall	Birds and Waterfall (1974)	Redmond Library, Redmond, Washington	Carved from redwood. Donated by Marvin Boys to Redmond Public Library.
1975	Two Thunderbirds	Two Thunderbirds (1975)	Marymoor Park, Redmond, WA	
1976	Indian Woman Weaving Basket		Yakima Valley College, Yakima, Washington	
1977	The Legend of the Moon	The Legend of the Moon (1977)	King County's Marymoor Park in Redmond, Washington	
1979	Fawn and Bird	Fawn and Bird (1979)	Redmond Library, Redmond, Washington	Carved from red cedar at Gibsons, BC. Donated by 'Lyn Lambert to Redmond Public Library.
1980	Mythical Bird	Mythical Bird (1980)	Pioneer Park, Mercer Island, Washington	Carved from yellow cedar at Gibsons, BC.
1982	Legends of the Deep #2	Legends of the Deep #2 (1982)	Northwest Arts Center, 9825 Northeast 24th Street, Bellevue, Washington	Donated to the City of Bellevue by Marvin Boys.
1983	The Beast		City College of San Francisco, San Francisco, California	
1984	Menace de Modernisme	Menace de Modernisme (1984)	North Bellevue Community Center, 4063 148th Ave NE, Bellevue, Washington, USA	Donated to the City of Bellevue by Marvin Boys.
1987	Seeds of Enchantment	Seeds of Enchantment (1987)	Redmond Library, Redmond, Washington	Made of red cedar. Sold to Penny Rediger, later to 'Lyn Lambert, loaned to Redmond Public Library.
1987	Adventures in Western Waters		Northwest Hospital, 1550 North 115th Street, Seattle, Washington	
1984	Hatching Bird	Hatching Bird (1984)	North Bellevue Community Center, 4063 148th Ave NE, Bellevue, Washington, USA	Donated to the City of Bellevue by Marvin Boys.
1989	Fantail Bird		Redmond Senior Center, Redmond, Washington	The Redmond Senior Center was closed in 2019 for renovations.
1989	Three Panel Abstraction	Three Panel Abstraction (1989)	Luke McRedmond Landing Park, Redmond, Washington	"When many in the art community began exploring abstraction and other forms of modern art, Carter ventured there too. Three Panel Abstraction, installed at Luke McRedmond Landoning on the shores of the Sammamish River is one such example. A typical Carter owl roots comfortably on the left panel while a raven head is carved into the right panel. The geometry of both figures as well as the plant form carved into the center panel has been accentuated." -- Lyn Fleury Lambert, Dudley Carter's secretary and chronicler.
1990	Windsong	Windsong (1990)	Medina Park, Medina, Washington	Made of red cedar.
1991	Celestial Adventure		Last seen near the Shilshole Bay Beach Club, Ballard, Washington	
