= Rose Piper =

American artist (1917–2005)

- Rose Piper, c. 1943
- Born: Rose Theodora Sams; October 7, 1917; New York City, New York, U.S.
- Died: May 11, 2005 (aged 87); Connecticut, U.S.
- Education: Hunter College
- Known for: Painting, Textile design

Rose Theodora Piper (October 7, 1917 – May 11, 2005) was an American painter best known for her semi-abstract, blues-inspired paintings of the 1940s. In the 1950s, out of financial necessity, she became a textile designer. For nearly thirty years, she worked as Rose Ransier, designing knit fabrics.

The American public took note of her work in the fall of 1947 when she gave her first solo exhibition—titled Blues and Negro Folk Songs—at the Roko Gallery in New York. The exhibition featured 14 paintings based on folk and blues songs. The show was very successful and was lauded by art critics; due to its resounding success, the show was held over for an extra week, and the vast majority of the paintings were sold. At the time, Piper was one of only four African-American abstract painters to have had solo shows in New York. After retiring from textile design, she resumed painting and exhibiting in the 1980s.

== Early life and education ==
Rose Piper was born Rose Theodora Sams in New York on October 7, 1917. She grew up in the Bronx, where her father was a public schoolteacher who taught Latin and Greek. Piper went to Evander Childs High School where she majored in art earning her a four year scholarship to Pratt Institute due to earning the highest graduating GPA in art. She had to decline due to family pressure. Later, she attended Hunter College, majoring in art and minoring in geometry, and graduated in 1940. From 1943 to 1946, she attended the Art Students League of New York, where she studied with Vaclav Vytlacil and Yasuo Kuniyoshi. It was during this period that the poet Myron O'Higgins introduced her to Sterling Brown, who encouraged her growing interest in blues music. Brown was the author of "Ma Rainey" (1932), arguably the quintessential blues poem; O'Higgins, his student at Howard University, had also written poetry on blues themes, such as "Blues for Bessie" (1945).

== Career ==
=== Blues-inspired paintings ===
The Death of Bessie Smith by Rose Piper, 1947

In 1946, Piper received a Julius Rosenwald fellowship and spent the summer traveling in the American South, "imbibing" the atmosphere, as she put it, and studying blues music. As a New Yorker, she had not grown up listening to the blues; she said in an interview years later, however, "I ran out and got all kinds of recordings and listened to them. I worked at it." Her research inspired a series of increasingly abstract, blues-themed paintings. "Back Water" (1946), inspired by Bessie Smith's "Backwater Blues", is both more figurative and literal in its approach than the paintings that followed. By 1947, Piper had adopted the Picasso-influenced, flat, geometric style seen in "Slow Down, Freight Train" and "The Death of Bessie Smith" (pictured right).

According to critic Graham Lock, this semi-abstract style was a fitting choice for the series because the blues themselves are stylized, often using exaggeration (such as "pouring water on a drowning man") to convey strong emotions. Piper never embraced pure abstraction, however, preferring to keep the human figure at the center of her work. Her purpose in creating art was political: to fight injustice "the best way I know how—by putting it on the canvas."

Her work attracted national attention in the fall of 1947, when Piper gave her first solo exhibition at the Roko Gallery in New York. Titled "Blues and Negro Folk Songs", the exhibition featured 14 paintings based on folk and blues songs. The show was a major success: praised by critics, it was held over for an extra week, and most of the paintings were sold. At that time, Piper was one of only four African-American abstract painters to have had solo shows in New York. The other three were Romare Bearden, Norman Lewis, and Thelma Johnson Streat.

Piper scored another win in 1948 when her work was included in the 7th Annual Exhibition of Paintings, Sculpture and Prints by Negro Artists. Sponsored by Atlanta University, it was one of the most prestigious venues for black artists; fellow exhibitors included Richmond Barthé, Robert Blackburn, Jacob Lawrence, and Hale Woodruff. Piper's Grievin' Hearted was awarded the prize for Best Portrait or Figure Painting.

Piper, alongside artist such as Elder Cortor, produced images during the 1940s that illuminated the constant contemporary problems related to women's control over their bodies within social, racial, and sexual milieux.

Piper's career peaked in the late 1940s. She kept a studio in Greenwich Village, and exhibited in the ACA Gallery. Her work was reviewed in The New York Times, Art Digest, and ARTnews. Her circle of acquaintances included James Baldwin, Billie Holiday, and Langston Hughes. Charles Alston was a friend and mentor. Recalling those years in a 1989 interview, she said, "I had the greatest time. The world was at my feet."

While it is not clear whether "Slow Down, Freight Train" was painted in 1946 or 1947, this painting represents a very different aesthetic approach to that of Back Water. This is Piper at her most semiabstract. When the Ackland Art Museum acquired the work in 1990, director Charles Millard wrote to Piper, enquiring about the origins of the title. The title referred to "Freight Train Blues", a recording by Trixie Smith who "sang and recorded the misery of the woman who had been left behind by men who hopped freight trains to the North".

Even as her blues-themed paintings won her attention and acclaim, Piper was wary of being stereotyped as a black painter limited to "black" themes. It was partly for this reason that, on receiving a second Rosenwald grant in 1948, she opted to work in Paris rather than continue her exploration of the American South.

=== Textile design ===
When Piper returned from Paris, a series of financial and family misfortunes forced her to put her painting career on hold. For a time she ran her own greeting card business. She then worked as a textile designer, using the name Rose Ransier. Over the next three decades she built a successful, albeit anonymous, career in fashion, while raising her two children and caring for ailing family members. Her minor in geometry gave her an edge in her new line of work: she was able to design patterns on graph paper that did not need to be adjusted for the knitwear machines. In 1973, she won the Knitted Textile Association's First Annual Knit Competition. When she retired in 1979, she was a senior vice president.

=== Later work ===
Go Down Neath, Easy An’ Bring My Servant Home by Rose Piper, c. 1988

In the 1980s, Piper returned to painting. This time she adopted a whole new style, influenced by her years in textile design: instead of semi-abstraction and a subdued, melancholy palette, the later paintings combined a meticulous attention to detail and bright acrylics. As influences, she cited Flemish School painters Hans Memling and Jan van Eyck, and the medieval Book of Hours tradition.

She still drew inspiration from African-American music, and her sense of political purpose had not changed. In 1989 she had a solo exhibition in New York, sponsored by the Phelps Stokes Fund. The centerpiece, titled Slave Song Series, was a set of ten 12 x 9 inch miniatures based on lines from spirituals. Half were set in contemporary urban locales; for example, Go Down Neath, Easy An’ Bring My Servant Home (pictured right) is set in the 96th Street subway station. Describing her motivation for the series, she wrote that "the current state of many inner-city blacks is not unlike the desperate situation of the slave ancestors."

== Death ==
Piper died of a stroke on May 11, 2005, in a Connecticut nursing home, aged 87.

== Personal life ==
Piper had two children, a son and a daughter, and was an aunt of the conceptual artist Adrian Piper.

== Selected exhibitions ==
- Blues and Negro Folk Songs, RoKo Gallery, New York, 1947
- 7th Annual Exhibition of Paintings, Sculpture and Prints by Negro Artists, Atlanta University, 1948
- Rose Piper: Paintings and Works on Paper, Phelps-Stokes Fund, New York, 1989
- The Search for Freedom: African-American Abstraction 1945–1975, Kenkeleba Gallery, New York, 1991
- A Force for Change: African American Art and the Julius Rosenwald Fund, Spertus Museum, Chicago, 2009

== See also ==
- New York Figurative Expressionism
