= Pacifica (statue) =

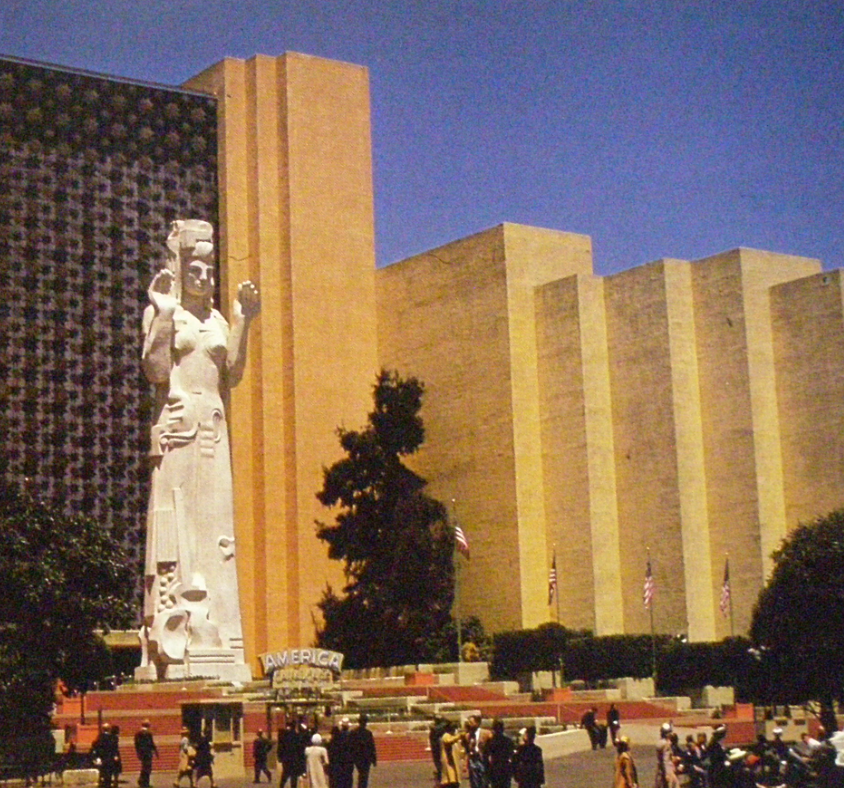
Pacifica at the Golden Gate International Exposition

Pacifica was a statue created by Ralph Stackpole for the 1939–1940 Golden Gate International Exposition held on Treasure Island in the San Francisco Bay. Stackpole's largest sculpture, it towered 81 feet (25 m) over the entrance to the Cavalcade of the Golden West in the Court of Pacifica. The Court of Pacifica was dedicated to the heroic explorers of Pacific Ocean territories. Pacifica was the theme statue for the exposition, representing world peace, neighborliness, and the power of a unified Pacific coast.

== Development ==
It took Stackpole two years to complete the statue as it started out as a three inch figure. It went through 50 renditions before settling upon the final model which was 10 feet (3.0 m) tall. The model was then divided into cross sections.

Each cross section was enlarged eight-fold though a process using a pantograph. Scaffolding was set up and prepared for the precise assembly of the enlarged sections. Iron was used for supports, bent and shaped around the proper contours of the statue. Next, mesh wire was layered over the entire iron frame, and then covered in a final blanket of plaster. Such a construction was always meant for temporary placement.

By November 1938, when Life photographer Alfred Eisenstaedt was capturing images to promote the event, Pacifica was ready for his camera. The magazine carried the image of this, Stackpole's most monumental work, "a peaceful, contemplative, almost prayer-like female figure".

== Pacifica at the Golden Gate International Exposition ==
Pacifica was physically the biggest and most conspicuous statue at the exposition. She was placed in front of a 100-foot (30 m) metal prayer curtain that had a backdrop of stars made of metal and small tubes that would make sound when met with a breeze. In front of the statue, in the center of the court, was a circular fountain surrounded by the works of eight different sculptors of figures representing people living on shores of the Pacific.

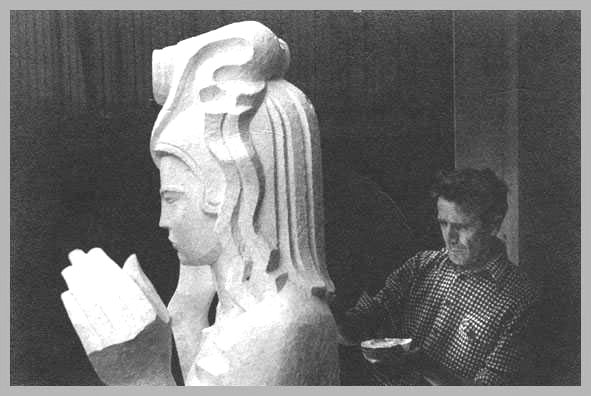
Ralph Stackpole with a model of Pacifica

== Presentation ==
=== Lighting ===
The statue was lit by two 1500 watt underwater floodlights. The giant spotlights gave Pacifica a look of "regal splendor." The backdrop, or Great Window, was lit by 75 amber, 150 red, and 300 blue floodlights, each 200 watts, all controlled by a thyratron. This gave the entire court a very colorful and mystical appearance after dark. "The contrast brought the great figure to life, as if it were about to walk down the esplanade into the Court of the Seven Seas."

=== Flowers ===
Orange calendulas were in full bloom around the statue, as well as red, yellow, and purple ranunculus and anemones which were said at the time to be very fragrant and added a romantic edge to the court.

== Destruction ==
From 1939 to 1940, some 16 million visitors came to the exposition.

After the exposition, Stackpole proposed that the sculpture be recast in a more permanent form—steel, stone or concrete—and positioned prominently on an island in the San Francisco Bay, perhaps Alcatraz or Angel Island, in a manner similar to the Statue of Liberty in New York Harbor. The plan was not seriously considered by civic leaders whose attention was on the events that soon brought the U.S. into direct involvement with World War II.

The United States Navy purchased the island as a naval base in 1941, and demolished Pacifica on January 22. Most other exposition structures were also demolished.

== Pacifica II ==
Currently, a non-profit organization called The Pacifica II Statue Project is working to recreate and resurrect Pacifica on Treasure Island. There is currently an 8-foot (2.4 m) replica of Pacifica at City College of San Francisco Ocean Campus, 50 Phelan Avenue in the garden next to the Diego Rivera Theater.

== Pacifica Radio ==
The Pacifica Statue is purported to be the inspirational namesake for the Pacifica Foundation, founders of which, in response to revulsion at warmongering propaganda on commercial radio at the breakout of the Cold War in general and the Korean War in particular, and dread that such messaging unopposed would lead to nuclear war, launched their flagship station, KPFA, across from Treasure Island in Berkeley in 1949, with a goal of developing a private but non-commercial media network for long-form education and discussion of non-violent relations locally, nationally and worldwide.
