= David Klein (chess player) =

Dutch chess grandmaster (born 1993)

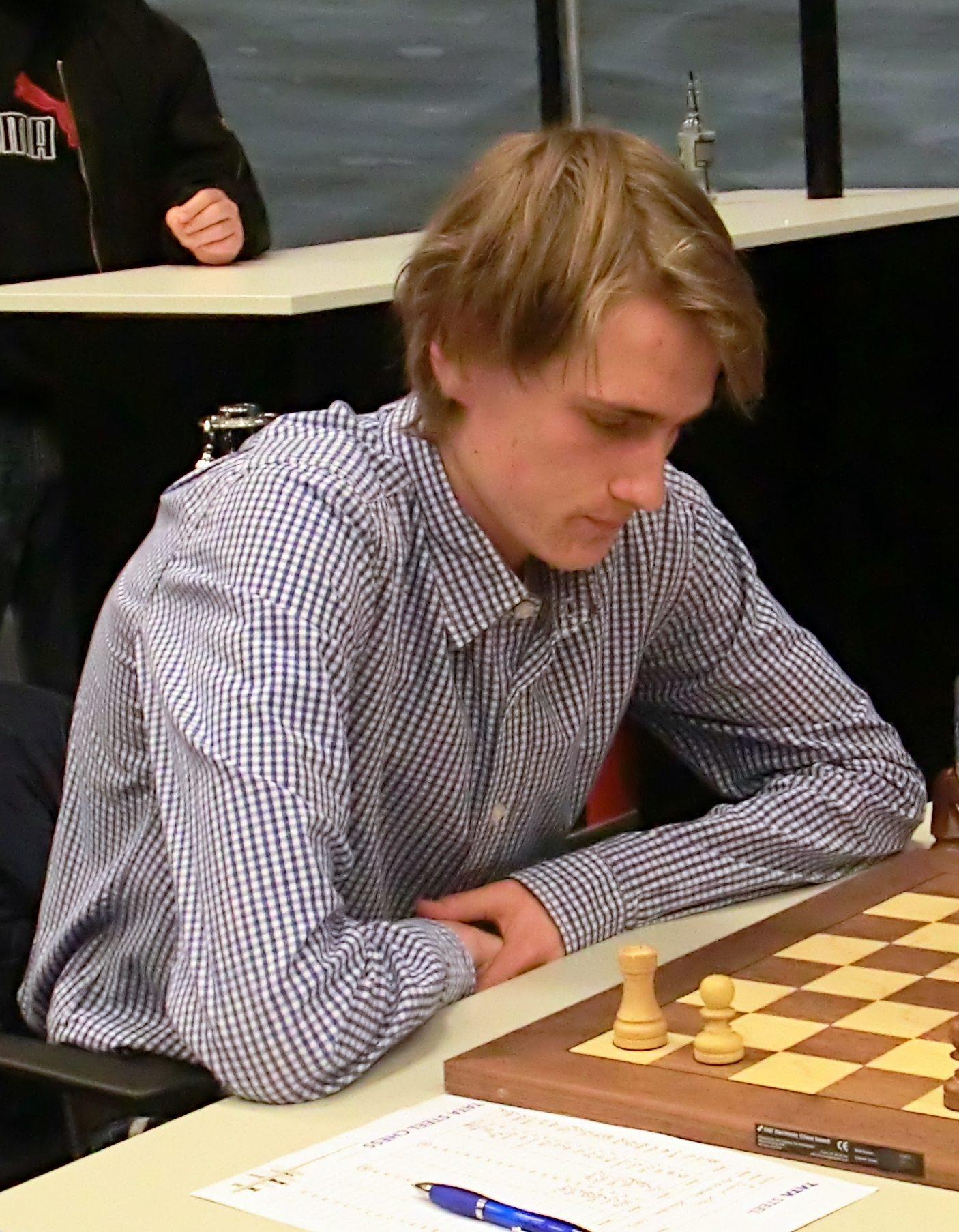
- David Klein, Wijk aan Zee 2013

Personal information
- Born: 20 December 1993 (age 32) Haarlem, Netherlands

Chess career
- Country: Netherlands
- Title: Grandmaster (2014)
- FIDE rating: 2495 (July 2026)
- Peak rating: 2517 (January 2015)

David Klein (born 20 December 1993) is a Dutch chess grandmaster.

== Chess career ==
Born in 1993, Klein earned his international master title in 2012 and his grandmaster title in 2014. He is the No. 19 ranked Dutch player as of March 2018.
