= David Klein (American artist) =

American illustrator

- Born: February 23, 1918; El Paso, Texas
- Died: December 9, 2005 (aged 87); New York, New York
- Education: Art Center School, Los Angeles, California
- Occupations: Artist, Commercial Illustrator

David Klein (February 23, 1918 – December 9, 2005) was an American artist, best known for his influential work in advertising. Although he produced illustrations for Broadway theatrical productions, Hollywood films, the United States Army, and numerous corporate clients, Klein is best remembered for the iconic travel images he created for Howard Hughes and Trans World Airlines (TWA) during the 1950s and 1960s.

== Early career ==
Klein was born in El Paso, Texas in 1918, but moved to California where he attended the Art Center School (later renamed Art Center College of Design) in Los Angeles. During the 1930s, he was a prominent member of the California Watercolor Society and displayed his work at various exhibits, most notably the Golden Gate International Exposition of 1939–40.

During World War II, Klein served for the United States Army and produced a variety of illustrations on behalf of the United States Armed Forces. In 1953, the United States Air Force created the Air Force Art Collection, which features several of Klein’s works. The Smithsonian Institution has periodically exhibited a number of these pieces at its museum in Washington D.C.

Following the war, Klein relocated to New York City where he became the preferred illustrator of the Broadway Theater District. He is credited with creating window cards and posters for many of the most popular Broadway productions of the late 1940s and early 1950s, including: Brigadoon; The Most Happy Fella; The Music Man; Cat on a Hot Tin Roof; and Alice In Wonderland.

== Trans World Airlines ==
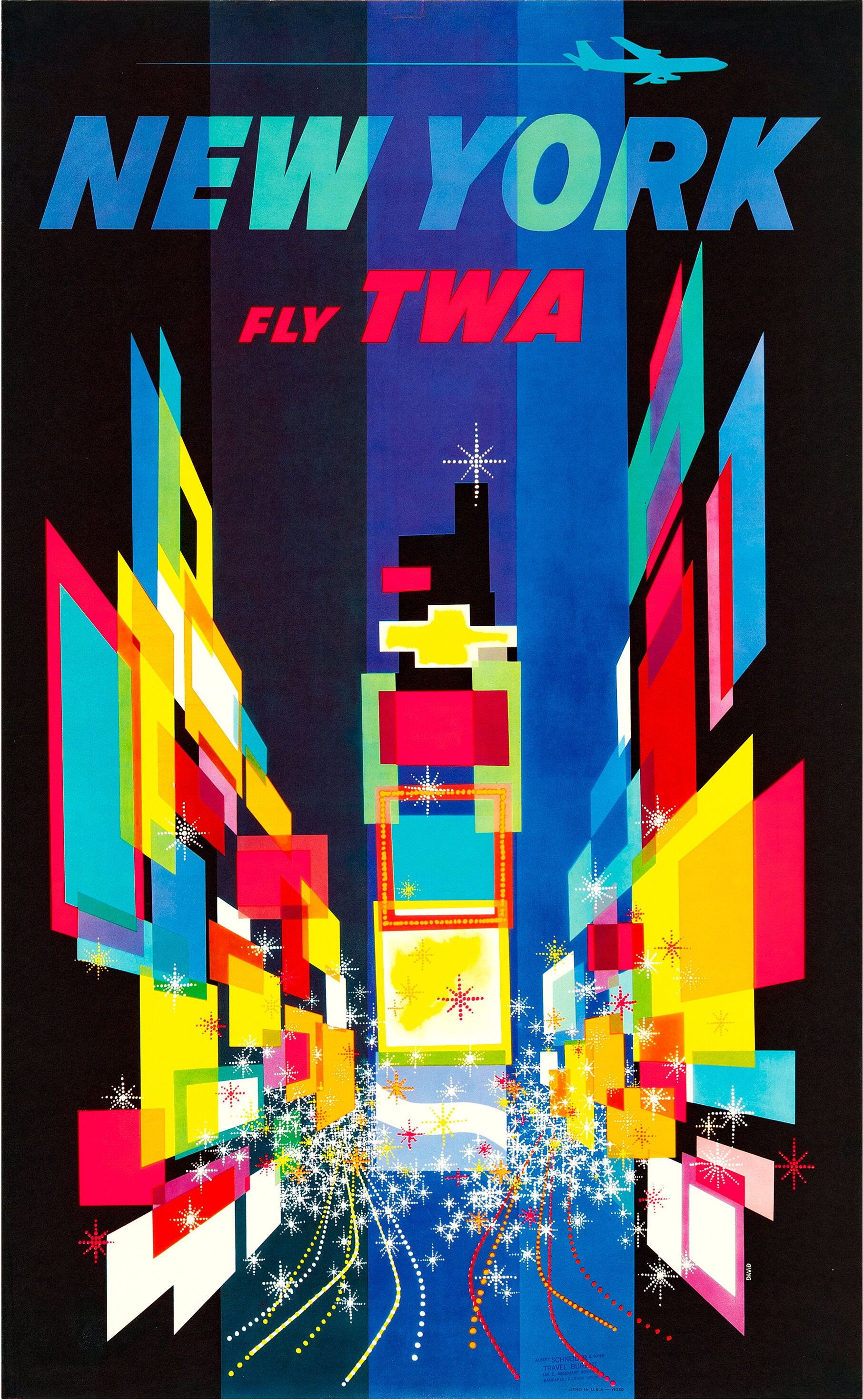
TWA NY Ad by David Klein

By the mid-1950s, Klein had established a reputation as one of America's preeminent commercial illustrators. However, his most lasting contribution to the art world came in the following decade as he applied his talent to the world of commercial travel. Between approximately 1955–1965, Klein designed numerous award-winning travel advertisement posters, many of which are now considered emblematic of the 1960s Jet Age. Klein produced the bulk of this work for Howard Hughes and Trans World Airlines (TWA), illustrating dozens of posters advertising travel throughout the United States and abroad.

Through his TWA work, Klein earned additional recognition, and, in 1957, New York’s Museum of Modern Art (MoMA) added Klein’s TWA Times Square poster to its permanent collection.

== Revival and renewed interest ==
In the summer of 2001, internet travel agency Orbitz launched a six-poster advertising series featuring Klein's original images. The Orbitz campaign, along with a resurgence of interest in 1960s commercial art, increased the popularity and resale value of Klein's work.

In late 2008, Entertainment Weekly featured Klein's 1964 TWA World’s Fair poster in an article discussing the popular AMC advertising drama, Mad Men.

On November 19, 2009, Swann Galleries sold Klein's aforementioned TWA Times Square poster at auction for $6,000.

The April 19, 2010 episode of the PBS television series, Antiques Roadshow, featured the same Times Square poster in its opening appraisal by poster expert Nicholas Lowry, describing the piece as "one of the greatest graphic depictions of Times Square."

On May 12, 2011, Christie's sold a first printing of Klein's TWA San Francisco poster for $5,700 at its South Kensington, London Vintage Poster Auction.

The January 10, 2012 online issues of The Atlantic featured an article titled, "How David Klein and TWA Branded America's Jet Age," which briefly chronicled Klein's role in creating the imagery that defined the era.

In November 2025, Swann Galleries broke the auction record for Klein, selling TWA New York Times Square poster for $25,400, representing the highest auction price ever recorded for Klein.
