= Pan American Unity =

Mural by Diego Rivera in San Francisco, California

Unión de la Expresión Artistica del Norte y Sur de este Continente
- The Marriage of the Artistic Expression of the North and of the South on this Continent (English), Pan American Unity (English)
- Artist: Diego Rivera
- Year: 1940
- Medium: Fresco on plaster
- Dimensions: 670 cm × 2,260 cm (264 in × 888 in)
- Location: San Francisco
- 37.727546°N 122.450914°W
- Owner: City College of San Francisco

Pan American Unity is a mural by Mexican artist Diego Rivera painted during the 1940 Golden Gate International Exposition (GGIE) held at Treasure Island, San Francisco. Rivera's work was the centerpiece of the Art in Action exhibit, which invited the public to watch different artists engaged in creating works.

== History ==
Pan American Unity, a true fresco, was painted locally in San Francisco on commission for San Francisco Junior College (later City College of San Francisco) during the second session of GGIE, held in the summer of 1940. At the time of the mural commission, college leadership had planned on installing it at the yet-to-be-built Pflueger Library after the closing of the 1939–1940 GGIE. Timothy Pflueger had designed the library with the intent that Rivera's mural would cover three walls; the mural as-completed would be mounted on the south wall of the library's reading room, and Rivera intended to return once the library was complete to add murals to the west and east walls. Both the San Francisco Arts Commission and San Francisco Board of Education received protests over the mural's content before its completion, primarily because of the included caricatures of Adolf Hitler and Benito Mussolini. The Art Commission approved the artistic merit in August 1940 but deferred the judgement of appropriate subject matter to the Board of Education. Pflueger announced that Rivera would continue to work on the mural for "at least another week" after the close of GGIE.

Rivera completed the mural three months after the close of GGIE, and 32,000 automobiles came to Treasure Island with up to 100,000 visitors to view the completed work on Sunday, December 1. The mayor of San Francisco, surveying the crowd, quipped "This Rivera is more popular than Wendell Willkie." The San Francisco Arts Commission accepted the mural in January 1941. After its showing in early December, the mural was crated and stored on Treasure Island.

While in storage, the de Young Museum declined to take the mural in 1941, as it was too large to move conventionally; the US$4,800 (equivalent to $110,000 in 2025) cost to lower the panels through a skylight was cited as the reason to decline it. That year, while extinguishing a hangar fire on Treasure Island, one of the crates was pierced by a fireman's axe, leaving a 20 in (510 mm) gash near the portrait of Sarah Gerstel in Section 5. Pflueger wrote to Rivera, who offered to repair the damage, but he never had the opportunity. The crated pieces were moved into storage at the college in June 1942, next to the men's gym. Emmy Lou Packard, Rivera's primary assistant on the mural, examined the damage but did not repair it at the time, instead choosing to wait for the installation of the mural in the library. However, with the start of the Second World War, the construction of the library was postponed to save materiel for wartime manufacturing, and after Pflueger's death in 1945, shelved indefinitely.

After Milton Pflueger (the younger brother of Timothy) was given the commission to design the CCSF campus theater in 1957, he proposed his initial design for the theater lobby should be expanded to accommodate the mural in the new facility. Packard returned to repair the damage after the theater was completed in 1961, and Mona Hoffman, another one of Rivera's assistants on the original work was unable to distinguish the repair, to Packard's delight.

The current library at CCSF, which opened in 1995, was designed with a four-story atrium to hold the mural, but it was not moved amid concerns of potential damage. In 1999, a Getty Conservation Institute expert chided college personnel to consider the next two hundred years, and the artist's daughter, Guadalupe Rivera Marín, challenged CCSF to construct a building dedicated to the mural. A conceptual building was designed by Jim Diaz of KMD Architects in 2012 to house the mural.

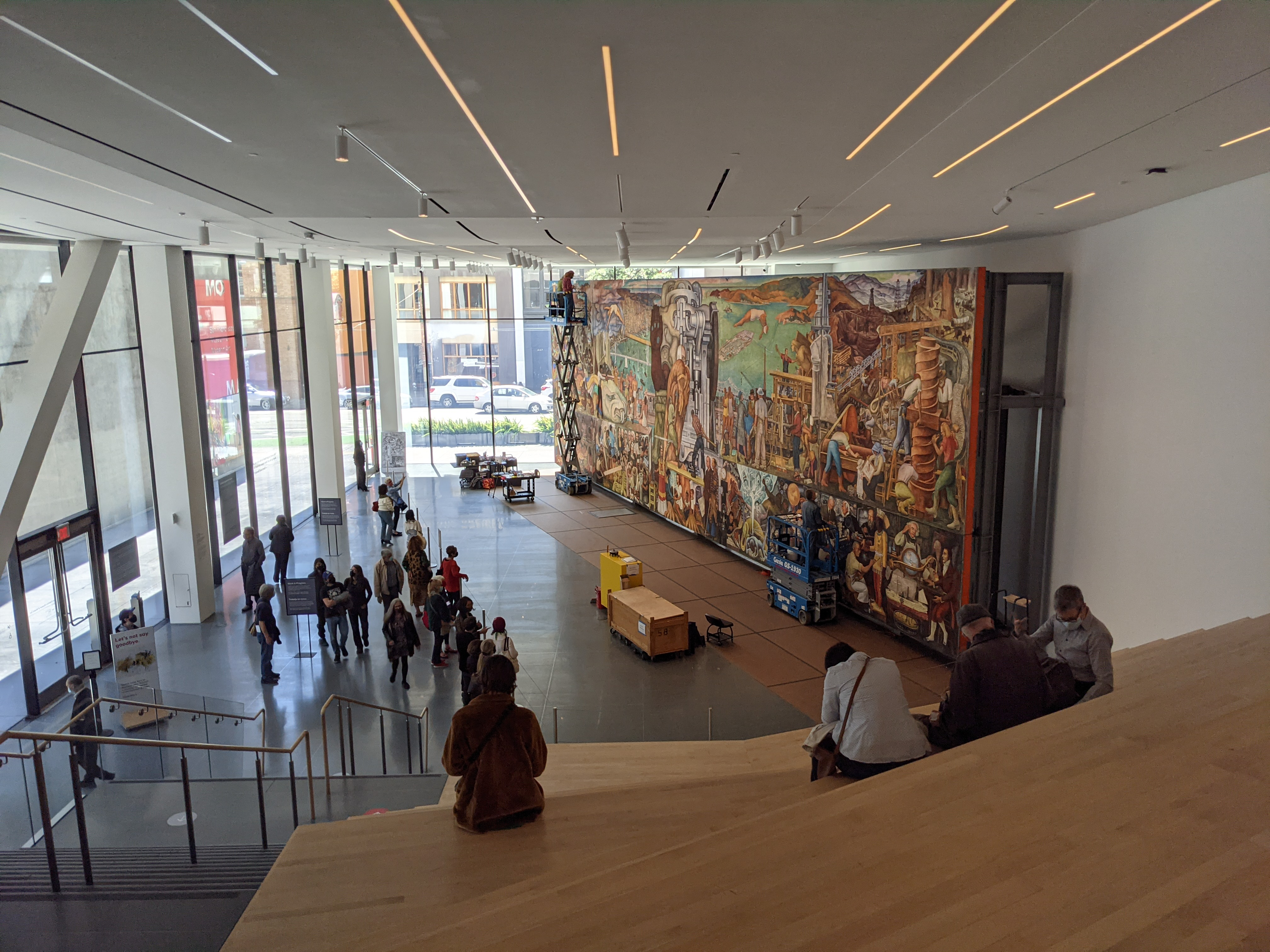
Pan American Unity being installed at SFMoMA (July 2021)

From June 2021 to 2024, the mural was exhibited at the San Francisco Museum of Modern Art (SFMoMA) and complemented the exhibition, Diego Rivera's America, to open in 2022. It was in the Roberts Family Gallery, which is freely accessible to the public. Its return to CCSF was ensnared in litigation over which institution would pay for it. Following resolution, Pan American Unity was disassembled and placed in storage at an undisclosed location on the CCSF campus.

As of January 2026, a vacant lot on the CCSF campus has been graded for the future Diego Rivera Performing Arts Center, which will house the mural.

=== Technical ===
The mural was created on 10 robust steel-framed panels bolted together and weighing about 23 short tons (21 t) in total. It was deliberately designed to be portable, as it would have to be moved to the college campus from Treasure Island after completion, and others have speculated Rivera made it portable after the destruction of Man at the Crossroads. At 22 ft × 74 ft (6.7 m × 22.6 m), it is his largest contiguous work and it completely spans the narrow lobby of the college's Diego Rivera Theater.

=== Assistants ===
Rivera was assisted in the project by Thelma Johnson Streat, an African-American artist and textile designer. Life magazine also noted the assistance of Mona Hoffman, and Rivera later wrote a letter to the editor crediting Emmy Lou Packard and Arthur Niendorff as his chief assistants.

== Theme ==
The formal title of the piece, as given by Rivera is Unión de la Expresión Artistica del Norte y Sur de este Continente (The Marriage of the Artistic Expression of the North and of the South on this Continent) , but it is more commonly referred to as Pan American Unity. During a 1940 interview Diego Rivera was quoted as saying,

"I believe in order to make an American art, a real American art, this will be necessary, this blending of the art of the Indian, the Mexican, the Eskimo, with the kind of urge which makes the machine, the invention in the material side of life, which is also an artistic urge, the same urge primarily but in a different form of expression."

— Diego Rivera

He later elaborated "American art has to be the result of a conjunction between the creative mechanism of the North and the creative power of the South coming from the traditional deep-rooted Southern Indian forms." Rivera felt that artists in North America should be inspired by New World native arts, especially as Europe was plunging back into war; Roland J. McKinney was quoted as saying "If Europe blows up and destroys its cultural heritage, the Americas can turn for inspiration to their own, indigenous art, the art that predates Columbus." The imagery is a comprehensive marriage of the themes of Mexican artistry and US technology in Pan-American Unity.

The mural included the images of his wife, Frida Kahlo, woodcarver Dudley C. Carter, and himself, planting a tree and holding the hand of actress Paulette Goddard. Timothy L. Pflueger is depicted holding the architectural plans for the planned Pflueger Library.

== The five sections ==
Schematic of Diego Rivera's Pan American Unity fresco (1940), showing the ten panels and approximate dimensions. Section 3 is the only section where the work extends from upper panel to lower panel. Figures from the Pioneer plaque have been added at approximately life size to illustrate the scale of the work.

The mural is composed of ten panels arranged in five sections, all of which relate Rivera's firmly held belief that multicultural artistic expression will form into a unified cultural entity regardless of individual points of origin. His belief in the eventual unity of the Americas, which became a common thread in much of his non-artistic expression, inspired the images represented in this mural.

Each section consists of a larger upper panel and a smaller lower panel. The sections are numbered from left to right.

=== Section One ===
'The Creative Genius of the South Growing from Religious Fervor and a Native Talent for Plastic Expression'

Persons depicted in Section One include:

- Nezahualcoyotl, shown holding a flying machine on left side of lower panel

=== Section Two ===
'Elements from Past and Present'

Persons depicted in Section Two include:

- Simón Bolívar, leftmost in the row of "great liberators" on the lower panel
- John Brown, in front of the row of "great liberators" on the lower panel
- Helen Crlenkovich (I), shown in an arching dive above the western span of the Bay Bridge at the top of the upper panel
- Miguel Hidalgo y Costilla, second from left in the row of "great liberators" on the lower panel
- Mona Hoffman, Rivera's assistant on the mural, on right edge of upper panel, gazing up at Crlenkovich
- Thomas Jefferson, second from right in the row of "great liberators" on the lower panel
- Mardonio Magaña, shown sculpting the snake-god Quetzalcoatl at the lower-left upper panel
- Abraham Lincoln, rightmost in the row of "great liberators" on the lower panel
- José María Morelos, third from left in the row of "great liberators" on the lower panel
- Diego Rivera (I), shown on left side of lower panel painting the row of "great liberators"
- George Washington, third from right in the row of "great liberators" on the lower panel

=== Section Three ===
'The Plastification of Creative Power of the Northern Mechanism by Union with the Plastic Tradition of the South'

The central section is largely taken up by a depiction of Coatlicue, Aztec Goddess of Life, merged with a huge stamping machine from Detroit, symbolizing the union between north and south. It is echoed throughout the section in the depiction of the modern carver (Carter) eschewing motorized tools for hand axes, in Kahlo looking for inspiration in native traditions (and dressed in native clothes), and in the symbolic joining of Rivera (from Mexico) and Goddard (from America) holding the "Tree of Life and Love" together.

Persons depicted in Section Three include:

- Dudley C. Carter, shown twice in the lower section of the upper panel, once carving wood and once swinging an axe; and shown once in the lower panel, next to Pflueger
- Paulette Goddard, holding the Tree of Life and Love with Rivera in the lower panel
- Frida Kahlo, holding a palette at the left side of the lower panel
- Donald Kairns, son of Emmy Lou Packard, shown watching Rivera and Goddard in the lower panel
- Timothy L. Pflueger, wearing a brown suit and holding architectural plans for the library
- Diego Rivera (II), holding the Tree of Life and Love with Goddard in the lower panel

=== Section Four ===
'Trends of Creative Effort in the United States and the Rise of Woman in Various Fields of Creative Endeavor through Her Use of the Power of Manmade Machinery'

Persons depicted in Section Four include:

- Mary Anthony, modeling a female architect under crane hook in upper panel speaking with Deichmann
- Charlie Chaplin, shown below the gaseous tyrants and three times on the right side of the lower panel as "Adenoid Hinkle" and a Jewish barber from The Great Dictator
- Helen Crlenkovich (II), shown in an arching dive above Treasure Island at the top of the upper panel
- Otto Deichmann, architect speaking with Anthony
- Paulette Goddard, shown twice in the lower right section of the lower panel
- Heinrich Himmler, speaking into a microphone above Robinson and Lederer at the left side of the lower panel
- Adolf Hitler, central figure of the trinity of tyrants shown escaping in gaseous form in the lower panel
- Francis Lederer, shown in a scene from Confessions of a Nazi Spy with Robinson at the left side of the lower panel
- Benito Mussolini, rightmost figure of the trinity of tyrants shown escaping in gaseous form in the lower panel
- Jack Oakie, as "Benzino Napaloni" to the right of the gaseous tyrants in the lower panel
- Emmy Lou Packard, primary assistant on the mural project, shown standing to the left of Wright in the upper panel
- Edward G. Robinson, shown in a scene from Confessions of a Nazi Spy with Lederer at the left side of the lower panel
- Joseph Stalin, leftmost figure of the trinity of tyrants shown escaping in gaseous form in the lower panel
- Frank Lloyd Wright, seated on rock at right side of upper panel

=== Section Five ===
'The Creative Culture of North Developing from the Necessity of Making Life Possible in a New and Empty Land'

Persons depicted in Section Five include:

- Thomas Edison, shown with light bulb and phonograph to the right of Ford
- Henry Ford, shown holding a fuel pump on the left side of the lower panel
- Robert Fulton, shown with steam boat models at right side of lower panel
- Sarah Gerstel, working on an embroidery sampler with a kerchief in the lower center of the upper panel
- Samuel Morse, shown holding telegraph tape above globe on right side of lower panel
- Albert Pinkham Ryder, painter of seascapes, in center of lower panel

== Representation of women ==
In the past, people have asserted that Diego's paintings predominantly feature allegorical, figurative figures that potentially conform to societal and historical attributes assigned to women, which would be evidence of the male gaze in his artistic creations. However, women are not simply objectified in the mural, which features a diverse array of figures that symbolize the cultural amalgamation of the Americas. The poses of the female figures vary, encompassing roles that span from agricultural labor to intellectual pursuits, suggesting a deliberate effort to depict women in diverse and empowered roles. However, some figures exhibit traditional femininity, raising questions about whether Rivera fully subverts established gender roles. The direction that the female figures are looking varies — some meet the viewer’s gaze with confidence, while others are engrossed in their activities, creating a nuanced interplay between agency and objectification.

== Reception ==
During the completion of the mural in November 1940, the editorial board of the Madera Times opined "There will be many who view the work who will wonder why, after it is placed in storage, it is not permitted to remain there. There would be no great loss to the art world if this could happen."

Patrick Marnham wrote "The colours and many of the details are superb ... Yet there is something unconvincing about the political ideas expressed" in his 1998 biography of Rivera. ... it would have made a wonderful storyboard for a Hollywood feature cartoon — but it does not move us." By 2021, Neal Benezra declared it "Rivera's painterly plea for a kind of unity of the Americas ... an anti-nationalist way of looking at things."

== Legacy ==
Pan American Unity inspired a poem by Bob Hicok, "Rivera's Golden Gate Mural", published in his first collection of poetry, The Legend of Light.

== See also ==
- List of works by Diego Rivera
