= Plumstead, Norfolk =

Village and civil parish in Norfolk, England

Coordinates: 52.86921°N 1.16532°E

Plumstead
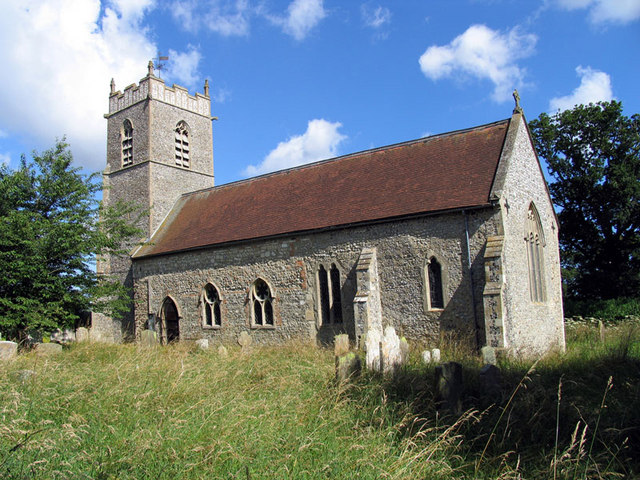
- Saint Michael parish church, Plumstead, Norfolk

- Location within Norfolk
- Area: 5.17 km^{2} (2.00 sq mi)
- Population: 128 (2011 census)
  - Density: 25/km^{2} (65/sq mi)
- OS grid reference: TG131348
  - London: 134 miles (216 km)
- Civil parish: Plumstead
- District: North Norfolk
- Shire county: Norfolk
- Region: East
- Country: England
- Sovereign state: United Kingdom
- Post town: NORWICH
- Postcode district: NR11
- Dialling code: 01263
- Police: Norfolk
- Fire: Norfolk
- Ambulance: East of England

Plumstead is a village and a civil parish in the English county of Norfolk. The village is 19.7 miles (31.7 km) north north west of Norwich, 9.5 miles (15.3 km) south-west of Cromer and 134 miles (216 km) north-east of London. The nearest town is Holt which is 4.8 miles (7.7 km) to the north west of the village. The nearest railway station is in the town of Sheringham where access to the national rail network can be made via the Bittern Line to Norwich. The nearest airport is Norwich International Airport. Plumstead falls within the area covered by North Norfolk District Council.

(Plumstead should not be confused with the Norfolk villages of Great Plumstead and Little Plumstead which are located close to each other, about 12 miles away, to the north-east of Norwich).

== History ==
The villages name means 'Plum-tree place'.

Plumstead has an entry in the Domesday Book of 1085. In the great book Plumstead is recorded by the names Plumestead. The main landholder was William de Warenne.

== Saint Michael parish church ==
The Grade II* listed parish church of Saint Michael was once much larger than it is today. On the south side of the building the low aisle has been demolished, and the clerestory filled in. The church's most notable feature is its collection of medieval and continental glass brought here from Catton Hall, near Norwich, in the 1950s.
