= AT&SF 1337 class =

Type of steam locomotive

The 1337 Class was a type of steam locomotive build by the Baldwin Locomotive Works for the Atchison, Topeka and Santa Fe Railway. They were built between 1912 and 1913, with a total of 52 build with road numbers 1337–1388. The 1337 Class had a 4-6-2 driver arrangement. They were all withdrawn from service by 1954.
