= Golden Gate International Exposition =

World's Fair held in San Francisco (1939–40)

1939–1940 San Francisco
- A map of the Exposition from the Official Guide Book

Overview
- BIE-class: Universal exposition
- Name: Golden Gate International Exposition
- Motto: A Pageant of the Pacific
- Area: 160 hectares (400 acres)
- Visitors: 17,000,000

Location
- Country: United States
- City: San Francisco
- Venue: Treasure Island
- Coordinates: 37.8242°N 122.3710°W

Timeline
- Opening: February 18, 1939
- Closure: September 29, 1940

Simultaneous
- Universal: 1939 New York World's Fair

The Golden Gate International Exposition (GGIE) was a World's Fair held at Treasure Island in San Francisco, California, U.S. The exposition operated from February 18, 1939, through October 29, 1939, and from May 25, 1940, through September 29, 1940; it drew 17 million visitors to Treasure Island. Among other things, it celebrated the city's two newly built bridges: the San Francisco–Oakland Bay Bridge and the Golden Gate Bridge.

== History ==
The idea to hold a World's Fair to commemorate the completion of the Bay Bridge and Golden Gate Bridge began with a letter to The San Francisco News in February 1933. Architects W.P. Day and George Kelham were assigned to consider the merits of potential sites around the city, including Golden Gate Park, China Basin, Candle Stick Point, and Lake Merced. By 1934, the choice of sites had been narrowed to the areas adjoining the two bridges: either "an island built up from shallow water" north of Yerba Buena Island (which would go on to be named Treasure Island), or the Presidio, which had previously been used in 1915 for the Panama–Pacific International Exposition. Yerba Buena Shoals was chosen as the site in February 1935. In August 1935, a $10 million proposal using federal WPA funds for construction work was advanced, and in October of that year, Leland W. Culter, president of San Francisco Bay Exposition, Inc., announced that President Roosevelt had approved US$3,000,000 (equivalent to $70,450,000 in 2025) to help fund the cost of reclaiming land at Yerba Buena Shoals.

San Francisco Bay Exposition was incorporated on July 24, 1934.

Initial schedules called for the fair to open on February 18, 1939, and to close on December 2, 1939, hosting a projected attendance of 20,000,000 people. Construction would employ 3,000, and running the fair would require a workforce of 10,000.

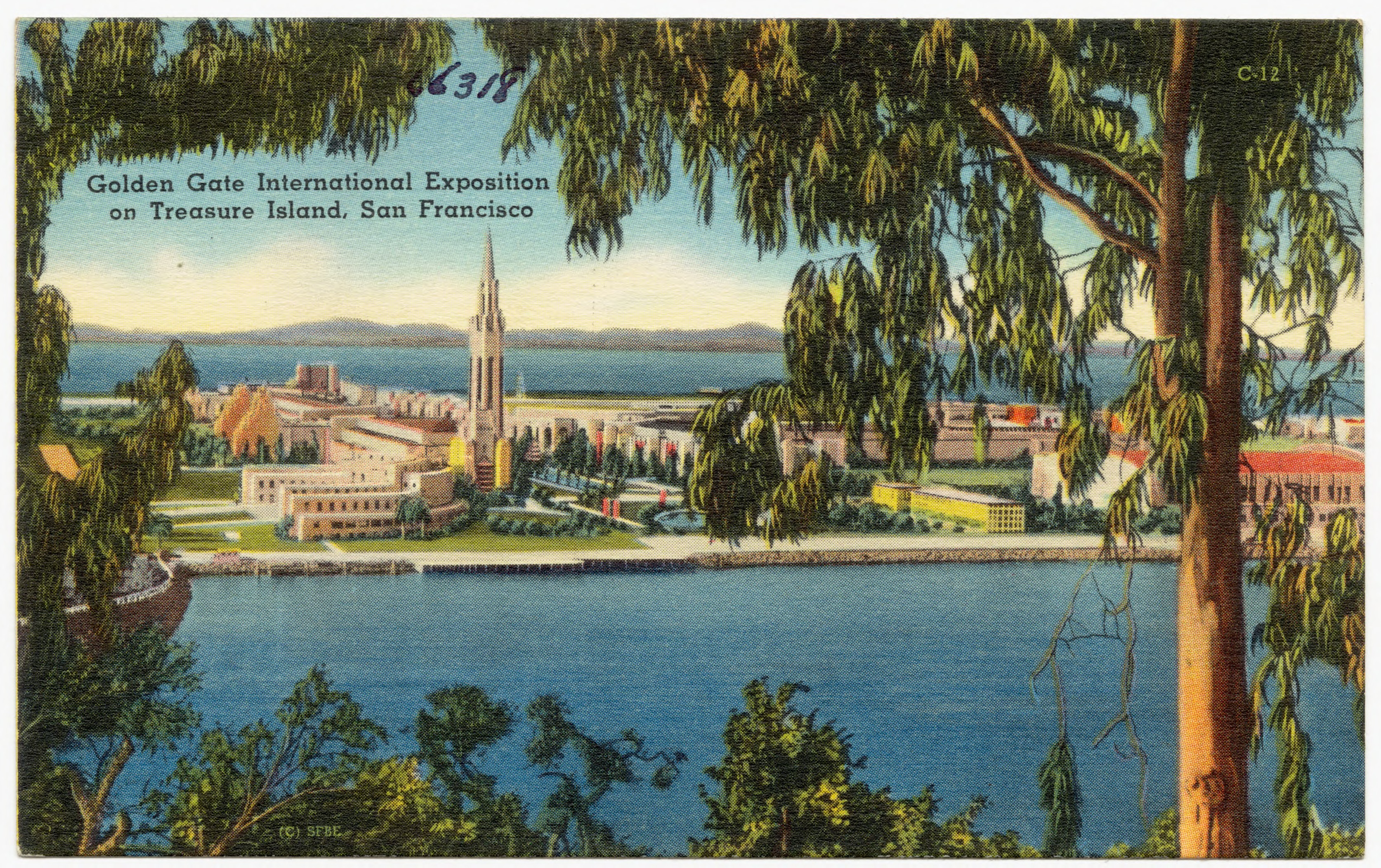
Golden Gate International Exposition on Treasure Island

=== Treasure Island ===
Treasure Island, a flat, geometrically shaped, artificial island attached to Yerba Buena Island, was built for the Exposition near where the Oakland span and the San Francisco span of the Bay Bridge join. The dredging of Treasure Island started on February 11, 1936. 19,000,000 yd^{3} (15,000,000 m^{3}) of fill were required for the 385-acre (156 ha) site. Initial schedules called for the completion of dredging by the end of 1936. The site was named Treasure Island by Clyde Milner Vandeburg, part of the Fair's public relation team, and it stuck.

Built by the federal government, Treasure Island was intended to serve as the municipal airport for San Francisco, an idea which had first been advanced in 1931. Air service would have included Pan American's transpacific flying boats, like the China Clipper. During much of the Fair, Pan Am offered two arriving and two departing flights each week, aboard the Boeing B-314s from Treasure Island; it took 16 to 20 hours to or from Hawaii.

Due to wartime needs, the Island was taken over by the US Navy as Naval Station Treasure Island from 1941 to 1997.

=== First closing ===
Losing money, the organizers petitioned under reorganization laws and closed the fair earlier than planned on October 29, 1939. Efforts to reopen the fair in 1940 were initially abandoned in early December 1939 before a compromise was ultimately reached before the end of December; a frantic reorganization ensued to open a partially revamped fair for a second shorter season in 1940.

== Attractions ==
=== Pageant of the Pacific ===
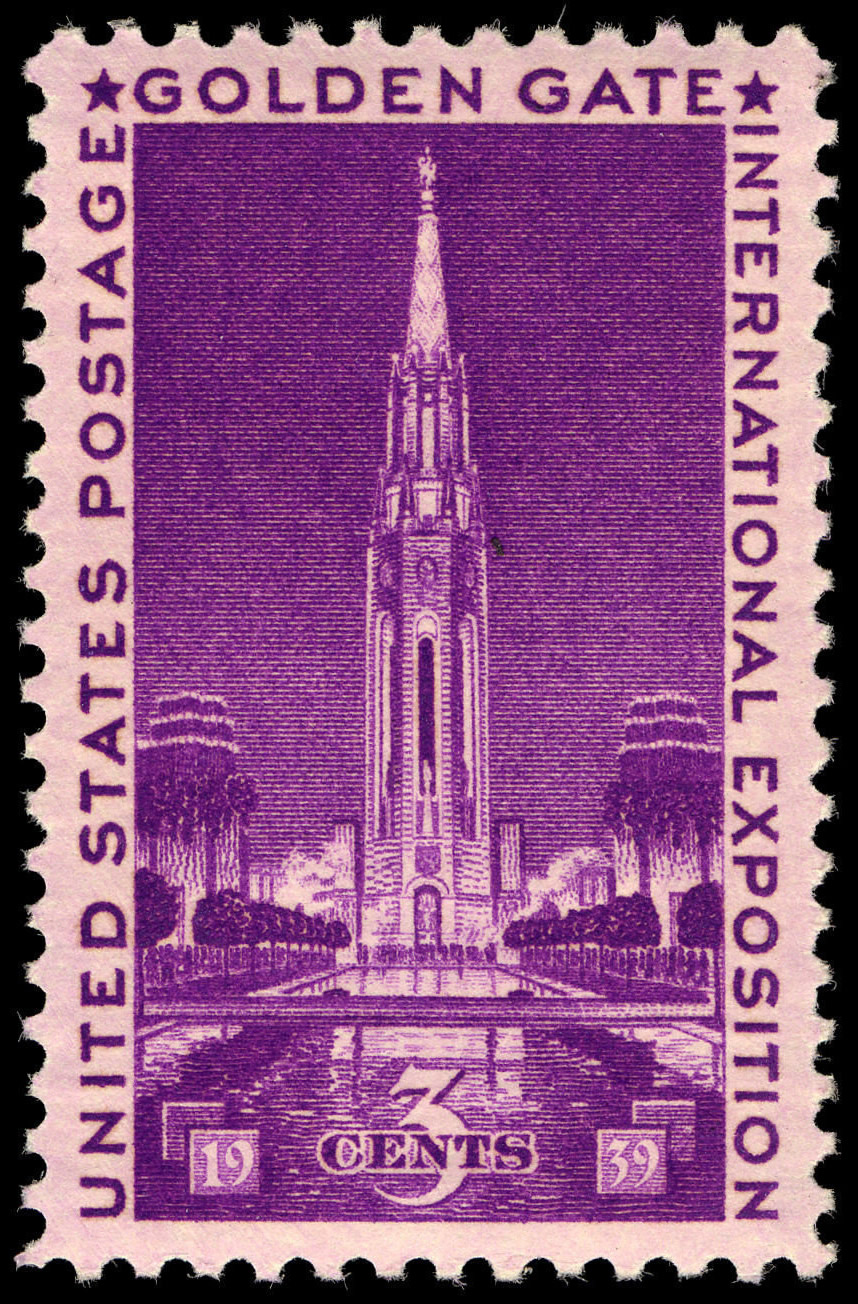
1939 U.S. commemorative stamp featuring the Tower of the Sun

The theme of the exposition was "Pageant of the Pacific", as it showcased the goods of nations bordering the Pacific Ocean. The theme was physically symbolized by "The Tower of the Sun;" by an 80-foot statue of Pacifica, goddess of the Pacific ocean; and by architect Mark Daniels' Chinese village, built and managed by San Francisco's George Jue.

As the boundaries of human intercourse are widened by giant strides of trade and travel, it is of vital import that the bonds of human understanding be maintained, enlarged and strengthened rapidly. Unity of the Pacific nations is America's concern and responsibility; their onward progress deserves now a recognition that will be a stimulus as well.
Washington is remote from the Pacific. San Francisco stands at the doorway to the sea that roars upon the shores of all these nations, and so to the Golden Gate International Exposition I gladly entrust a solemn duty. May this, America's World's Fair on the Pacific in 1939, truly serve all nations in symbolizing their destinies, one with every other, through the ages to come.

— President Franklin D. Roosevelt, via radio, during the opening ceremonies.

The San Francisco Downtown Association created the 49-Mile Scenic Drive to promote the exposition and the city. The drive started at San Francisco City Hall and ended on Treasure Island after winding around the "City by the Bay."

=== Architecture ===
William P. Day, a locally prominent architect, was appointed director of works and George W. Kelham served as the chief architect until his death in October 1936, when he was succeeded by Arthur Brown Jr. The fair was built in a specially created architectural style called 'Pacifica', a streamlined mix of Art Deco incorporating various Asian and Latin American (such as Maya or Inca, but also Spanish Colonial) architectural elements.

=== Fine arts ===
During the Expo in 1939, Master carver John Wallace (Haida) demonstrated the art of carving totem poles for visitors.

The Art in Action exhibition was staged at GGIE during its second session in the summer of 1940 to show artists at work and attract visitors.

=== The 1939 NCAA basketball tournament ===
As part of the exposition, the California Coliseum, located near the grounds' northeast corner, hosted the Western Regional semifinal and Final rounds of the first-ever NCAA Division I men's basketball tournament. The Coliseum, listed in NCAA guidebooks as having a capacity of 9,476, hosted two Elite Eight games and a Final Four game (before 1952, there were only two regions and the champions met in the National Championship game, which was the only game played at what is now considered a "Final Four" site). The Western regional included the Oklahoma Sooners, Oregon Webfoots, Texas Longhorns, and Utah State Aggies. In the opening of round of Regional semifinals (now referred to as the Elite Eight), Oregon beat Texas 56-41 and Oklahoma beat Utah State 50-39. In the Regional Final round (now known as the national semifinal round), the Webfoots beat the Sooners 55-37, advancing to the National Championship game in Evanston, Illinois, where they won the first ever national championship 46-30 over the Ohio State Buckeyes. There was also a regional third-place game played in the Coliseum, which was won by the Aggies, 51-49.

=== Gayway ===
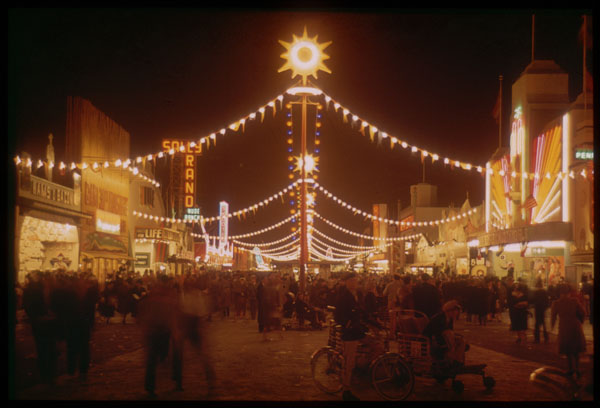
The GGIE "Gayway" at night (1940)

The GGIE featured a 40-acre (16 ha) midway named the "Gayway" after a contest was held in 1938 to name the Amusement Zone.

One of the more successful attractions in the Gayway featured Sally Rand, who starred in "Sally Rand's Nude Ranch" (styled as "Sally Rand's N~~D~~ude Ranch"); a contemporary publicity postcard shows Rand posing with female ranch hands, called "Nudies", as strategically placed fence boards conceal implied nudity. Other Gayway sights included sideshow-style attractions, such as little people in a Western setting and a racetrack featuring monkeys driving automobiles.

== Transportation ==
The Key System ran special trains to the fair from the East Bay area during the first year, bearing the "X" designation for "Exposition". These trains ran along the same East Bay routes as the Key transbay trains, and used the same rolling stock, the "bridge units", but instead of using the newly opened bridge railway, they were diverted to the old Key System ferry pier ("mole") as there was no stop available at Yerba Buena Island. A ferry crossed the relatively short span of water between the end of the pier and Treasure Island. This service ended at the close of the first phase of the exposition at the end of 1939. In 1940, the "X" train-ferry service was entirely replaced by Key System buses, also designated "X".

The Atchison, Topeka and Santa Fe Railway started a passenger train, the Valley Flyer, to carry passengers between Bakersfield and Oakland during the exposition. The Chicago, Burlington, and Quincy Railroad, Denver and Rio Grande Western Railroad, and the Western Pacific Railroad launched the Exposition Flyer passenger service between Chicago and Oakland, named for the Golden Gate International Exposition.

The adventurer and travel author Richard Halliburton, sailing his Chinese junk Sea Dragon to San Francisco from Hong Kong, perished in a typhoon while crossing the Pacific on his way to the exposition in March 1939.

== Legacy ==
In 1939, James A Kilpatrick's Travel Talks issued "A Day on Treasure Island" a ten-minute Technicolor short exploring the Golden Gate International Exposition. In 1940 it was followed by "Night Descends on Treasure Island", an eight-minute short focusing on the art exhibitions among other features of the GGIE, anticipating its closing in September 1940.

In October 2010, the National Building Museum in Washington, D.C. opened an exhibition titled Designing Tomorrow: America's World's Fairs of the 1930s. This exhibition, which was available for view until September 2011, prominently featured the Golden Gate International Exposition.

Many of the art pieces that were created from the Art in Action exhibition, including the Pan American Unity mural by Diego Rivera, three Dudley C. Carter wood carvings, and two Frederick E. Olmsted sculptures are now housed and displayed at City College of San Francisco.

The Fauna and Flora of the Pacific mural by Miguel Covarrubias is now on display at the de Young museum in San Francisco. The colorful and oversized map depicts the four Pacific Rim continents with examples of their flora and fauna suspended in a swirling Pacific Ocean populated with sea creatures.

== See also ==
- Art in Action, the live art exhibition that took place at the GGIE 1940
- Panama–Pacific International Exposition (1915 San Francisco World's Fair)
- Pan American Unity mural
