= Oakland Technical High School =

Coordinates: 37°49′56.07″N 122°15′14.64″W

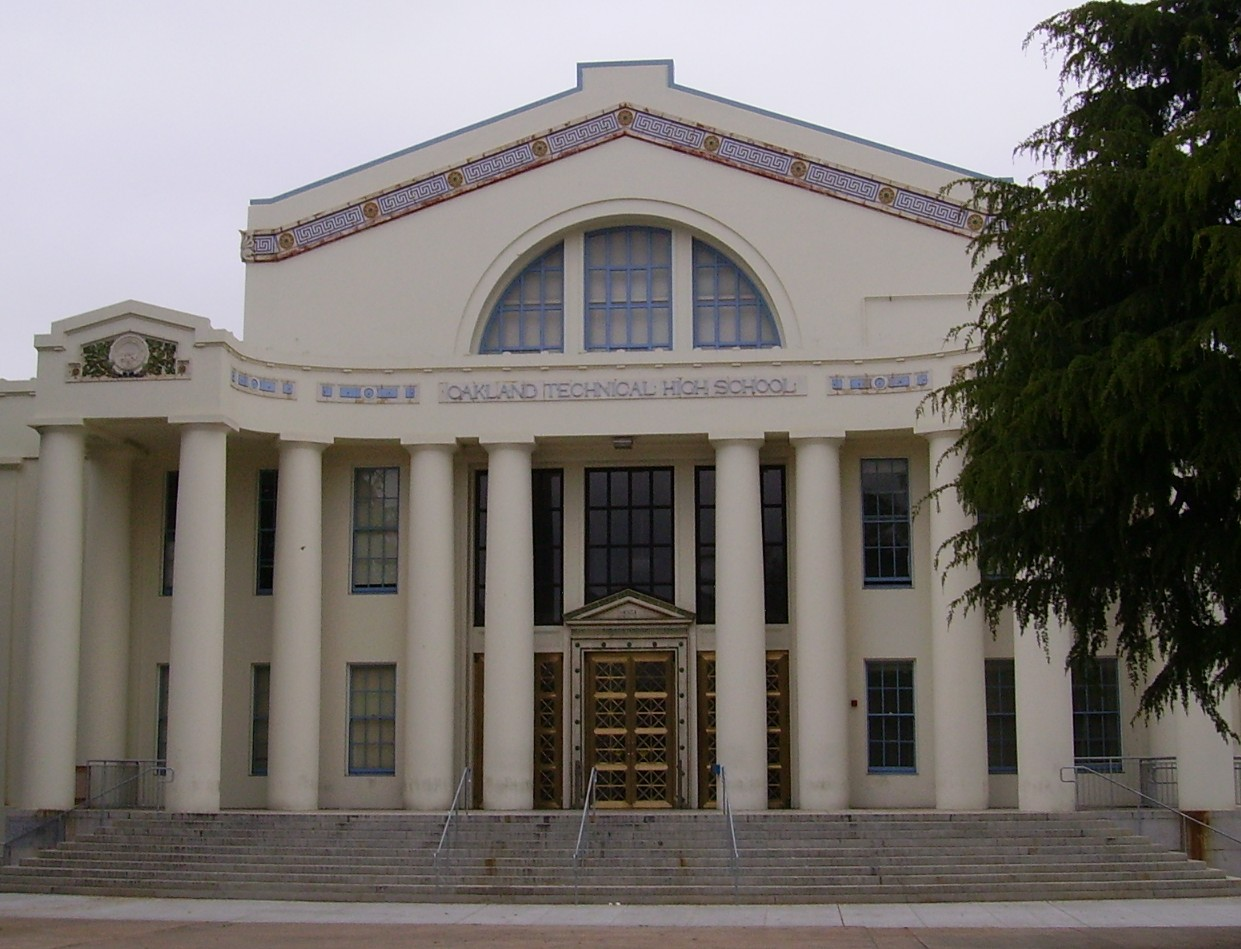
- Front entrance to Oakland Technical High School

Location
- 4351 Broadway; Oakland, California 94611; USA

Information
- Type: Public high school
- Established: 1914
- School district: Oakland Unified School District
- Principal: Martel Price
- Teaching staff: 97.27 (FTE)
- Grades: 9–12
- Enrollment: 1,813 (2023–2024)
- Student to teacher ratio: 18.64
- Colors: Purple and gold
- Athletics conference: CIF Oakland Section
- Mascot: Bobo the Bulldog
- Nickname: Tech, Oakland Tech
- Accreditation: WASC
- Newspaper: The Scribe
- Yearbook: The Scribe Annual
- Website: oaklandtech.ousd.org

Oakland Designated Landmark
- Designated: 1985
- Reference no.: 99

Oakland Technical High School, known locally as Oakland Tech or simply "Tech", is a public high school in Oakland, California, United States, and is operated under the jurisdiction of the Oakland Unified School District. It is one of six comprehensive public high school campuses in Oakland. Oakland Tech's attendance jurisdiction includes several neighborhoods, including Oakland Chinatown, Rockridge, North Oakland, and Temescal.

Tech received the maximum 6-year accreditation from the Western Association of Schools and Colleges in 2009.

== History ==
Oakland Tech's main building was built in 1914 and resembles the main science building of the Massachusetts Institute of Technology. During the 1970s, when many California schools were being demolished and rebuilt for earthquake safety, Tech's main building was determined to be too historic to tear down. Instead, it was gutted and rebuilt on the inside, while its historic exterior was preserved. The school was declared the 99th historic landmark by the city of Oakland on July 23, 1985.

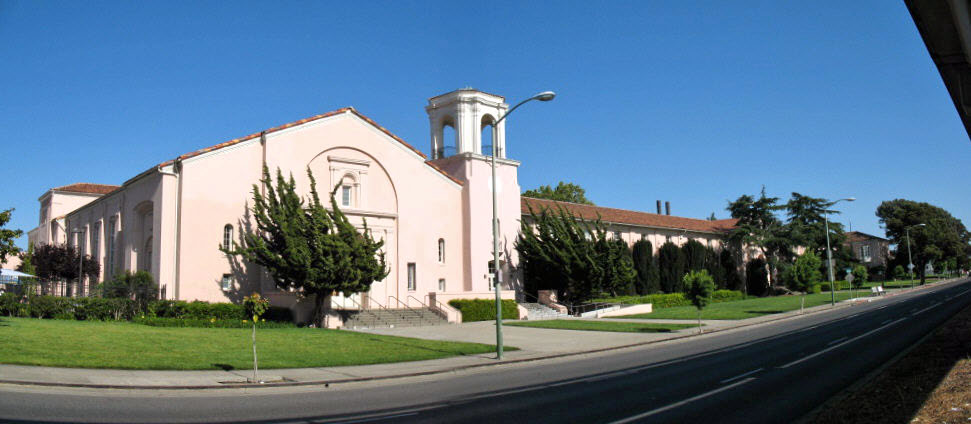
University High School, where Tech moved temporarily during retrofitting in the 1970s

While Tech was closed for earthquake retrofitting in the 1970s, the school was displaced to 5714 Martin Luther King Jr. Way (formerly Grove Street). This location is sometimes erroneously referred to "Old Tech" but was actually the campus of the now defunct University High School (1923–1948). That campus had then served as Merritt College from 1954 to 1970 and is considered the birthplace of the Black Panthers.

In 1977 a group of students from a U.S. Government class at Tech launched a drive to create a California state holiday in honor of Martin Luther King Jr. The idea was not new - about a dozen states already had such holidays, and it had been proposed unsuccessfully at the national level - but it was still controversial. The students formed themselves into a group called "The Apollos" and lobbied for the holiday for four years; it was finally passed by the legislature and signed by the governor in 1981. In 2008 two students at other Oakland high schools heard about the Apollos and made an award-winning short documentary film about their successful quest.

== Academies ==
Students at Oakland Technical High School have the option of enrolling in one of the school's academies, which operate as small subsets of the school. Students take one class within their academies and spend the rest of the day in normal classes. Academies at Tech include Computer Academy, Health Academy, Engineering Academy, Race Policy and Law (RPL) Academy, and Fashion Academy.

The Engineering Academy focuses on mechanical engineering. Starting in 10th grade, the students in this academy study engineering, physics (focused on mechanics), drafting, architecture, etc.

Paideia is an advanced History and English program founded by Mary Ann Wolfe, a political science and government teacher who worked at Oakland Tech for over thirty years. In the sophomore year, students have the option to take English 2 Paideia and World Cultures. In 11th grade, students have the option to enroll in AP or HP English and US History. In 12th grade, students who are recommended may take the advanced senior block, consisting of AP Government, AP Literature, and HP Comparative Government, in which they analyze works of art and compare them to the government. In senior year, students, according to grades, are also able to take AP Government and AP English 4. Students can be jointly enrolled in Paideia within select academies in 10th grade and any academy in 11th and 12th grades.

In 2008, over half of the advanced senior block was accepted to the prestigious UC Berkeley. Students regularly score 4s or 5s for AP classes taken in the Paideia program.

The Race, Policy, and Law academy began in the 2017–18 academic year.

== School profile ==
Oakland Technical High School is a Title I school and approximately 53% of the student body qualifies for free or reduced price lunches. The total school enrollment in 2016-17 was 2,037 students.

Tech is a highly diverse school, with students comprising a range of racial, ethnic, and socio-economic backgrounds. In 2016–17, the student body was 32% African American, 24% white, 22% Asian, 16% Latino/Hispanic, 2% Pacific Islander, and 4% other.

== Test scores ==
After being sued for refusing to do so, the Oakland Unified School District mandates that every school publish a public record of their standing on a variety of standardized tests and other quantitative analyses.

California Standard Tests Scores, proficiency rate
| English | Mathematics | Science |
| 48% | 25% | 48% |

== Notable alumni ==
- Merrill Kenneth Albert, Class of 1941 - author and trial lawyer
- Steven F. Arnold - filmmaker, photographer, painter, illustrator, set and costume designer, and assemblage artist
- Pervis Atkins, Class of 1954 - NFL football player, actor
- Frank Shozo Baba, Class of 1933 - Japanese American Nisei who made radio broadcasts during World War II in U.S. and in post-war Japan
- Stephen Bechtel, Class of 1918 - engineer, president, CEO of Bechtel Corporation, 1933–1960
- Yusuf Bey, Black Muslim activist and leader
- Bernice Bing, Class of 1955 - artist, activist
- Linc Blakely, Class of 1931 - Major League Baseball player, Cincinnati Reds
- Esther Baum Born, Class of 1920 - architectural photographer, author
- Souley Boum, Class of 2017 - basketball player
- Antonia Brico (born Wilhelmina Wolthius), Class of 1919 - classical pianist, first woman conductor of the New York Philharmonic
- John Brodie, Class of 1953 - NFL player, quarterback of San Francisco 49ers; professional golfer, Senior PGA Tour
- Gabriel Carroll, Class of 2001 - award-winning mathematician, Stanford economics professor
- Howard Christie, Class of 1929 - film and television producer, All-American football player at University of California, Berkeley
- Bruce Cunningham, Class of 1923 - Major League Baseball player, Boston Braves
- Charles Cushing, Class of 1923 - composer and conductor
- Jack Delinger, Class of 1946 - professional bodybuilder, 1949 AAU Mr. America and 1956 Mr. Universe
- Ron Dellums, Class of 1953 - former U.S. Congressman, former mayor of Oakland
- Alfred Delucchi, Class of 1949 - Superior Court Judge
- Bernie DeViveiros, Class of 1920 - Major League Baseball player, Chicago White Sox, Detroit Tigers
- Taylor Douthit, Class of 1919 - Major League Baseball player, St. Louis Cardinals, Chicago Cubs, Cincinnati Reds
- Sue Draheim, Class of 1967 - internationally recognized fiddler
- Rockmond Dunbar, Class of 1991 - film and television actor, Sons of Anarchy, The Mentalist, Soul Food
- Clint Eastwood, Class of 1949 - film actor, producer, Academy Award-winning director, former mayor of Carmel-by-the-Sea, California
- Lloyd Noel Ferguson, Class of 1934 - chemist, university professor, first African-American to earn Ph.D. in chemistry from University of California, Berkeley
- Curt Flood, Class of 1956 - Major League Baseball player, Cincinnati Reds, St. Louis Cardinals, Washington Senators known for challenging Reserve clause
- Len Gabrielson, Class of 1933 - Major League Baseball player, Philadelphia Phillies
- Len Gabrielson, Class of 1957 - Major League Baseball player, Milwaukee Braves, Chicago Cubs, San Francisco Giants, California Angels, Los Angeles Dodgers
- Joe Gaines, Class of 1955 - Major League Baseball player, Cincinnati Reds, Baltimore Orioles, Houston Astros
- John Gillespie, Class of 1920 - Major League Baseball player, Cincinnati Reds
- Evelyn Nakano Glenn, Class of 1958 - Professor and director of University of California, Berkeley Center for Race and Gender.
- Alexis Gray-Lawson, Class of 2005 - professional basketball player, Phoenix Mercury
- Bob Greenwood, Class of 1946 - Major League Baseball player, Philadelphia Phillies
- Randall B. Griepp, Class of 1958, cardiovascular surgeon
- Bud Hafey, Class of 1929 - Major League Baseball player, Chicago White Sox, Pittsburgh Pirates, Cincinnati Reds, Philadelphia Phillies
- Tom Hafey, Class of 1931 - Major League Baseball player, New York Giants, St. Louis Browns
- Bernie Hamilton, Class of 1946 - actor, Starsky and Hutch
- Jack Hayford, Class of 1952 - minister, chancellor, songwriter
- Rickey Henderson, Class of 1976 - Hall of Fame Major League Baseball player (inducted 2009), member of eight teams
- Proverb Jacobs, Class of 1954 - NFL football player, Philadelphia Eagles, New York Giants
- Josh Johnson, Class of 2004 - NFL quarterback
- Rodney Joseph Johnson, Class of 1984 - Houston police officer
- Louise Jorgensen, Class of 1916 - ballerina and choreographer; director/producer of Oakland Christmas Pageant (1919–1987)
- Thomas Kraabel, Class of 1952 - Biblical archaeologist
- Ted Lange, Class of 1966 - director, screenwriter, actor in The Love Boat, That's My Mama
- Cookie Lavagetto, Class of 1931 - Major League Baseball player, Pittsburgh Pirates, Brooklyn Dodgers, manager of Washington Senators, Minnesota Twins
- Don Lofgran, Class of 1946 - Professional basketball player
- Terrell Lowery, Class of 1988 - College Basketball player, Major League Baseball player
- Marshawn Lynch, Class of 2004 - NFL All-Pro running back for Super Bowl champion Seattle Seahawks, Oakland Raiders, co-founder and owner of the Oakland Panthers
- Tony Martin, Class of 1930 - actor, singer, entertainer
- Bill McKalip, Class of 1926 - college All-American football player, NFL player, Portsmouth Spartans, Detroit Lions
- Rod McKuen, Class of 1951 - poet, musician, songwriter
- Joe Mellana, Class of 1922 - Major League Baseball player, Philadelphia Athletics
- Abbas Milani, Class of 1965 - historian, author, director of Iranian studies at Stanford University
- Mistah F.A.B. Class of 2000 - rapper
- Huey P. Newton, Class of 1959 - co-founder of Black Panther Party
- Ray Norton, Class of 1956 - Olympic sprinter (Rome, 1960), NFL football player, San Francisco 49ers
- Frank Oz, Class of 1962 - actor, film director, puppeteer for The Muppets
- Nell Irvin Painter, Class of 1959 - historian, author, professor at Princeton University
- Milman Parry, Class of 1919 - scholar of epic poetry, Homeric studies, professor at Harvard University
- Wolfe Perry, Class of 1974 - actor, college basketball player at Stanford University
- The Pointer Sisters (Ruth Class of 1963, Anita Class of 1965, Pat Class of 1968) - Grammy Award-winning R&B singing group
- Patricia Polacco, Class of 1962 - children's author
- Jim Pollard, Class of 1940 - NBA player and coach, Minneapolis Lakers, 5-time NBA champion, member of Basketball Hall of Fame
- Jay Porter, Class of 1950 - Major League Baseball player, St. Louis Browns, Detroit Tigers, Washington Senators, St. Louis Cardinals
- Leon Powe, Class of 2003 - NBA basketball player, Boston Celtics, Cleveland Cavaliers, Memphis Grizzlies
- Les Powers, Class of 1927 - Major League Baseball player, New York Giants, Philadelphia Phillies
- Roy Shivers, Class of 1959 - NFL player, St. Louis Cardinals, first African-American general manager of professional football franchise, Saskatchewan Roughriders
- Rick Shubb, Class of 1962 - musician, graphic artist, inventor of Shubb Capo, popular guitar and banjo accessory
- Ted R. Smith, Class of 1925 - aircraft designer
- Jack Soo (Goro Suzuki), Class of 1934 - comedian, actor, Barney Miller
- Peter Stackpole, Class of 1931 - photographer
- Rehema Stephens, Class of 1987 - basketball player, Sacramento Monarchs
- Robert Webber, Class of 1941 - film and TV actor, 12 Angry Men, Private Benjamin, 10, The Dirty Dozen
- George Wells, Class of 1965 - professional wrestler, Canadian Football League player
- Arleigh Williams, Class of 1930 - college football, baseball player, University of California, Berkeley administrator
- Yukmouth, Class of 1993 - rapper

== See also ==
- List of Oakland, California high schools
