= Rick Shubb =

Richard Shubb (born January 11, 1945, in Oakland, California) is best known as the inventor of the Shubb Capo, a very popular guitar and banjo accessory. His 1978 patent is cited by Sterner's Capo Museum as being one of the most significant improvements in the development of the capo. He also invented the lever-operated banjo fifth string capo, the compensated banjo bridge, and holds several other U.S. and international patents on musical instrument accessories and improvements.

He is also a noted and influential 5-string banjo player and teacher. He was among a handful of young West Coast musicians to discover and popularize bluegrass music, which was already well established in the Southeast. He graduated from Oakland Technical High School in 1962, and during the folk boom of the 1960s he played in coffeehouses and taverns in Berkeley and San Francisco, playing with such musicians as Doc Watson, David Grisman, Jerry Garcia, and others. He later went on to develop a distinctive swing-influenced banjo style, which he performed and recorded during the 1970s and 1980s.

Rick Shubb also is known as a graphic artist. During the psychedelic era he drew posters for the Carousel Ballroom, one of San Francisco's hip rock palaces. Three of his posters are included in The Art of Rock, the definitive work on rock posters. He was a featured artist in various underground comic books, including his own Brain Fantasy published by Last Gasp, and his popular poster Humbead's Map of the World was regarded as an integral part of the folk-rock culture of the 1960s.

Rick Shubb currently owns and operates his own company, Shubb Capos, which manufactures various guitar and banjo accessories.
