= Rodney Johnson =

Rodney Johnson may refer to:

- Rodney L. Johnson (1955–2023), United States Army general
- Rodney Joseph Johnson (1965–2006), Houston Police officer
- Rodney Van Johnson (born 1961), African-American actor
- Rodney Johnson (sport shooter) (1927–2016), Australian Olympic shooter

== See also ==
- Rod Johnson (disambiguation)
