= Harvey Reid =

- Born: 1954 (age 70–71); California
- Genres: Folk
- Occupation(s): Guitarist, composer
- Instrument: Guitar
- Years active: 1976–present
- Labels: Woodpecker Records
- Website: http://harveyreid.com/

Harvey Reid (born 1954) is an American musician living in York, Maine. He won the 1981 National Fingerpicking Guitar Competition and the 1982 International Autoharp competition. As of 2024, he has released nineteen albums.

Often referred to as a troubadour or minstrel singer as well as a folk singer, Reid plays several instruments, including the six- and twelve-string acoustic guitar, slide guitar (dobro), six-string banjo, and autoharp.

Reid is married to Joyce Andersen, a fiddler, guitarist and singer-songwriter who has appeared on several of Reid's releases.

== Early life ==
Reid was born in 1954 in California, where he lived for the first few months of his life. He was the fourth child of six. His mother was a descendent of a family which has been in Bath, Maine, since the 17th century. His father was from Pittsburgh, Pennsylvania.

After stays in New Mexico and Michigan, his family settled in Washington, D.C.

He graduated from the University of Maryland in 1974. In 1976, he began graduate school at the University of Wisconsin, but dropped out to focus on music.

== Career ==
He is best known for his solo acoustic fingerstyle guitar work, but he is also a flatpicker and autoharp player who performs and records with dobro, mandolin, mandocello, bouzouki and six-string banjo.

In 1976, Reid began teaching folk guitar at the University of Maryland.

He has been a full-time musician since 1976, and has released 25 recordings on the Woodpecker label, containing nearly 500 tracks of original, traditional and contemporary acoustic music.

Reid won the 1981 National Fingerpicking Guitar competition and the 1982 International Autoharp contest and has performed over 6,000 concerts in most of the fifty states and a number of European countries. Reid also won Bill Monroe's Beanblossom bluegrass guitar contest in 1976.

Reid established Woodpecker Records in 1982, when he released his first LP of solo acoustic guitar, titled Nothin' but Guitar. After one more LP release in 1983 and two cassettes in 1986 and 1987, Reid released the indie CD Of Wind & Water in 1988. All of Reid's recordings feature extensive use of a number of types and nearly two dozen configurations of partial capo.

Reid self-published a book in May 1980, titled A New Frontier in Guitar. It was done with a beta version of Scribe software, a Xerox Alto computer (the predecessor to the Apple Macintosh) and a prototype Diablo laser printer. Also in 1980, Reid co-founded the Third Hand Capo Company with Jefferson Hickey, and has been responsible for spreading the partial capo idea around the acoustic guitar world. He has now written six books on the subject, and is actively working at present on a series of instructional works showing how to use this device to expand the capabilities of the guitar. In 1984, Reid co-wrote the first college textbook for folk guitar, Modern Folk Guitar, which was published by Random House. It remains in print and is in use in university music departments.

Reid is responsible for the appearance of the Fishman Acoustic Blender amplification system, and has been involved with the evolution of a number of on-stage acoustic guitar amplification tools. He was also the first artist to endorse the Taylor Guitar brand, and has been involved with a number of instrument and equipment manufacturers, helping to design and stage-test gear for modern acoustic musicians.

In 2024, Reid was inducted into the Maine Music Awards Hall of Fame.

== Recordings and books ==
- 1980 "A New Frontier in Guitar" (book)
- 1982 "Nothin' but Guitar" (LP)
- 1982 "Duck Soup Guitar" (book)
- 1983 "A Very Old Song" (LP)
- 1983 "Sleight of Hand" (book)
- 1984 "Modern Folk Guitar" (book)
- 1984 "The Christmas Project" (cassette)
- 1986 "The Coming of Winter (cassette)
- 1987 "Heart of the Minstrel on Christmas Day (cassette)
- 1988 "Of Wind & Water" (CD)
- 1989 "Solo Guitar Sketchbook" (CD)
- 1990 "Overview" (CD)
- 1992 "Steel Drivin' Man" (CD)
- 1994 "Circles" (CD)
- 1995 "Artistry of the 6-String Banjo" (CD)
- 1996 "In Person" (2-CD)
- 1998 "Fruit on the Wine" (CD)
- 2000 "Guitar Voyages" (CD)
- 2001 "The Great Sad River" (CD)
- 2002 "Dreamer or Believer" (2-CD)
- 2003 "The Autoharp Album" (CD)
- 2004 "Kindling the Fire" (CD)
- 2005 "The Christmas Project" (CD)
- 2006 "Capo Inventions" (book w/CD)
- 2007 "The Song Train" (4-CD/book)
- 2009 "Blues & Branches" (CD)
- 2009 "The Wreck of the Isidore" (book w/CD)
- 2010 "Capo Voodoo: Book 1- The Cut Capo Chord Book" (book)
- 2010 "Solo Guitar Project: Vol 1" (digital album)
- 2010 "Solo Guitar Project: Vol 2" (digital album)
- 2010 "Capo Voodoo: Solo Guitar" (CD)
- 2010 "Capo Voodoo: Songs" (CD)
- 2011 "Songs from a Long Road" (CD)
- 2013 "The Autoharp Waltz" (CD)
- 2014 "The Liberty Guitar Album" (CD)
- 2014 "The Liberty Guitar Method" (CD)

== Personal life ==
Reid is married to New Hampshire-born fiddler and singer-songwriter Joyce Andersen. They have two sons and live in southern Maine.
