= Ralph Stackpole =

American artist (1885–1973)

Ralph Ward Stackpole
- Stackpole in his studio in 1940 photo by Peter Stackpole for LIFE magazine
- Born: May 1, 1885; Williams, Oregon, U.S.
- Died: December 13, 1973 (aged 88); Puy-de-Dôme, France
- Education: California School of Design; École des Beaux-Arts
- Known for: Sculpture

Ralph Ward Stackpole (May 1, 1885 – December 10, 1973) was an American sculptor, painter, muralist, etcher and art educator, San Francisco's leading artist during the 1920s and 1930s. Stackpole was involved in the art and causes of social realism, especially during the Great Depression, when he was part of the Public Works of Art Project, Federal Art Project of the Works Progress Administration, and the Treasury Department's Section of Painting and Sculpture. Stackpole was responsible for recommending that architect Timothy L. Pflueger bring Mexican muralist Diego Rivera to San Francisco to work on the San Francisco Stock Exchange and its attached office tower in 1930–31. His son Peter Stackpole became a well-known photojournalist.

== Early career ==
Stackpole worked as a laborer early in life to support himself and his mother following the death of his father in a lumber mill circular saw accident. At sixteen, he came to San Francisco to study at the California School of Design (now San Francisco Art Institute) beginning in 1903; he was influenced strongly by Arthur Frank Mathews, muralist and painter at the school. He met painter Helen Arnstein (later Helen Salz) while both were teenagers, and she became his first girlfriend. Arnstein, the daughter of wealthy Jewish art lovers and one year Stackpole's senior, described him as "a remarkable draftsman" who painted and sketched constantly. She was less impressed with his sense of color than with his precision in line. Stackpole polished his craft by working with artists at the Montgomery Block, playfully called "Monkey Block", a bohemian hangout which included studios for painting and sculpture. After the 1906 San Francisco earthquake, he used a grant of US$200 ($7,200 in current value) to travel to France to attend the École des Beaux-Arts in the class of Antonin Mercié in 1906–1908, exhibiting at the Salon in 1910. It was in Paris that he became friends with painter Diego Rivera He painted under Robert Henri in New York in 1911.

== San Francisco ==
Stackpole returned to San Francisco in 1912 and married Adele Barnes, two months younger than he, an art student of Xavier Martínez and one of the first graduates of the California Academy of Arts and Crafts. Adele Stackpole was a perfectionist in many ways, including the precision of her bookplate engravings and the demands she placed on her relationships. On June 15, 1913, the Stackpoles' son, Peter, was born in San Francisco.

Stackpole was part of the foursome that founded, early in 1913, the California Society of Etchers (CSE). The other founders were Robert B. Harshe, an etcher and art professor at Stanford University, etcher and educator Pedro Lemos, who taught at the San Francisco Institute of Art, and Gottardo Piazzoni, an Italian-American painter and muralist who was Stackpole's master in France. The CSE exhibited twice in 1913, and grew to 78 artist members and five associate after two years. In 1926, the annual publication listed 46 artist members and 156 associate members: Stackpole was still a member. Decades later, the CSE merged with another group to become the California Society of Printmakers.

=== Panama-Pacific International Exposition ===
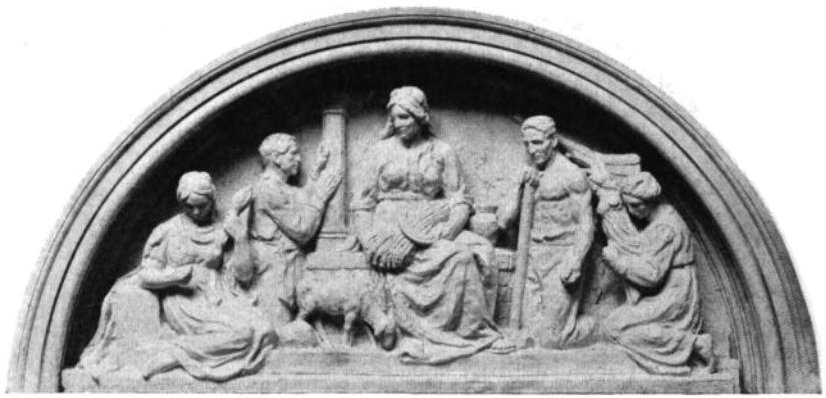
"Tympanum group of Varied Industries" (1915)

Around the same time, Stackpole was commissioned to sculpt architectural features for the 1915 Panama–Pacific International Exposition, a major assignment that was to take two years to complete, even with the aid of assistants. To give a grand entrance portal to the Palace of Varied Industries, he completed a copy of the main entrance to the Hospice of Santa Cruz, built in Toledo, Spain in the 16th century. Stackpole's design replaced the original figures of Catholic saints with figures of industry. His works for the Palace of Varied Industries included "Man with a pick", "Tympanum group of Varied Industries", "New World Receiving Burdens of Old", "Keystone figure", and "Power of Industry". Stackpole also sculpted figures of "Thought" on the columns flanking the half domes of the west facade of the Palace Group. At the Palace of Fine Arts, Stackpole produced a kneeling "Venus" on the Altar of Inspiration. Visitors wishing to view "Venus" were kept some 50 yards (50 m) away by a man-made lagoon.

=== Modern trends ===
With Piazzoni, Stackpole went to France again in 1922, taking his family; he enrolled his nine-year-old son in the École alsacienne, a private school in Paris. The two artists wished to investigate the most modern trends in Europe, and they encountered Diego Rivera. While there, Stackpole's marriage unraveled, and he returned to the Bay Area in 1923 with a 24-year-old French still life artist and model named Francine Mazen, nicknamed "Ginette"; his wife and son returned after the school year to take up residence across the bay in Oakland. Stackpole obtained a divorce, and then married Ginette in Mexico.

In late 1923, Stackpole organized a major art exhibit, in partnership with Piazzoni. This was the first large-scale art show in San Francisco since 1915; there had been no expected rush of artists after the Panama-Pacific International Exposition. The exhibit, held in Polk Hall in the Civic Auditorium, was companion to a nearby print exhibit which included Gauguin and Matisse works. Critic and author Laura Bride Powers felt that the event was a disappointment—it displayed "inconspicuous examples" of leading artists, and failed to show any Picasso, avant-garde or Dadaist works.

In 1926, Stackpole delivered the William A. Coleman Fountain to the city of Sacramento, a Moderne work (centrally located in what is now known as Cesar Chavez Park) which celebrated the city's completion of a difficult water filtration project. That same year, Stackpole traveled to Mexico City to see Rivera working on some of his 124 frescoes in the courtyard of the Secretariat of Public Education. Returning with a small Rivera painting, Stackpole gave it to San Francisco Arts Commission president William Gerstle (who was initially unimpressed), and began a several-year effort to bring Rivera to work in California.

Stackpole accepted an offer to teach at his former school, its name having changed to the California School of Fine Arts (CSFA) [now San Francisco Art Institute]. For a stretch of almost twenty years, he taught a number of subjects. Dorr Bothwell studied sculpture under Stackpole, then the head of the Sculpture Department, and thought him to be sexist—she said he told the women in the class that "the place they really belonged was in bed."

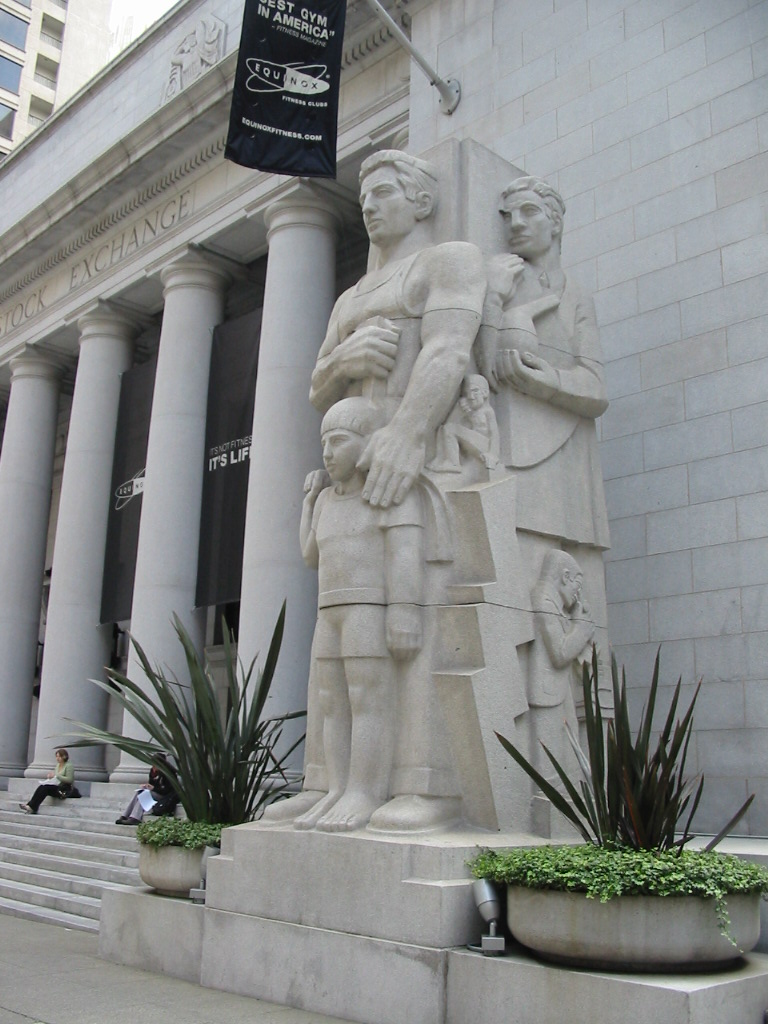
Site placement of Industry (1932) shows its position at the right of the former San Francisco Stock Exchange building.

Kenneth Rexroth wrote of Stackpole in 1929 that "He knew everybody in town from top to bottom ... and he took us everywhere." Stackpole's sizable San Francisco studio at 716 Montgomery (adjacent to Montgomery Block) served as a social center for San Francisco's artist community. Photographer Dorothea Lange rented upstairs studio space there in 1926, and Helen Clark and Otis Oldfield, both artists, married there the same year. Lange's husband Maynard Dixon had his studio next door, and the Stackpole and Dixon families were close—both men were members of the Bohemian Club.

Throughout the 1930s, Stackpole worked frequently with architect Timothy Pflueger on various commissions. Beginning in 1929 when the two men first met, Stackpole was given responsibility for selecting the artists who worked to execute and augment Pflueger's basic design scheme for the San Francisco Stock Exchange and its associated Tower, especially the Luncheon Club occupying the top floors of the Tower. Stackpole said later of the experience, "the artists were in from the first. They were called in conference and assumed responsibility and personal pride in the building." At the Sansome Street tower entrance, Stackpole worked on a scaffolding with a crew of assistants to direct carve heroic figures in stone. After the building was completed, Stackpole was finally successful in winning a commission for Rivera; Pflueger became convinced that Rivera would be the perfect muralist for decorating the staircase wall and ceiling of the Stock Exchange Club. This was a controversial selection considering Rivera's leftist political beliefs in contradiction to the Stock Exchange's capitalist foundation. Into the mural, Rivera painted a figure of Stackpole's son Peter holding a model airplane.

During his stay, Rivera and his wife Frida Kahlo lived and worked at the studio, becoming in the process lifelong friends with Stackpole and Ginette. They met tennis champion Helen Wills Moody, an avid painter-hobbyist, who soon agreed to model for Rivera at the studio. Neighbor Dixon saw the attention, and the American money being given to Rivera, and with etcher Frank Van Sloun organized a short-lived protest against the Communist artist. However, both Dixon and Van Sloun quickly realized that the San Francisco art world "oligarchy" who were obviously smitten with Rivera, including Stackpole's well-connected patrons, were the same group that they themselves would need to support their own art aspirations.

For much of 1931, Stackpole partnered with other artists to decorate Pflueger's Paramount Theatre in Oakland, an Art Deco masterpiece. A bas-relief scene of horses, waves and a central winged figure was placed over the stage's proscenium arch, finished in gold-toned metal leaf—the work jointly designed by Stackpole and Robert Boardman Howard. The design worked into Pflueger's metal grille ceiling grid likely came unattributed from Stackpole's sketches. Pflueger was an able project leader; Stackpole later described his involvement: "He was the boss alright, as an architect should be ... He would call the plays just as a symphony conductor does ... There wasn't a lock, molding, or window that he did not inspect in the drawings and in the actual building with the utmost thoroughness and care."

Stackpole worked through ten months of 1932 on a monumental pair of sculptures flanking the grand entrance of the Stock Exchange: a male and a female grouping showing the polarity of agriculture and industry, showing in their rounded human shapes the influence of Rivera. Chiseling into 15 short tons (14 t) of Yosemite granite, he wore goggles and a mask. The unveiling ceremony took place in the cold of New Year's Eve, with Mayor Angelo Rossi joining Stackpole, Pflueger and artisans in smocks.

Stackpole took his son Peter to visit their photographer friend Edward Weston in Carmel in the early 1930s, and the two older men spent the day discussing photography, "the difference between making and taking a photograph, between the intended and the random". This conversation, and the 1932 exhibit by Group f/64, a collection of innovative photographers such as Weston and Ansel Adams, was later seen as foundational to Peter Stackpole's conception of photography.

In July 1933, Stackpole completed a model of a design to be incorporated into the San Francisco–Oakland Bay Bridge's central anchorage on the western side. The anchorage, to be constructed of concrete rising 197 feet (60 m) above the water, was to display over much of its height a bare-chested male figure standing solidly between the two suspension spans. However, Arthur Brown, Jr., Pflueger's colleague on the Bay Bridge project, did not like the scale of the figure, which belittled the bridge. Engineer Ralph Modjeski agreed, writing "The gigantic figure which is proposed for the centre anchorage is out of place for a structure of this kind and would not harmonize with the end anchorage." Stackpole's design was abandoned in favor of a largely flat expanse of poured concrete.

In 1933 and 1934, Stackpole took part in the Public Works of Art Project assignment to paint murals for Coit Tower. Many of the murals were executed in styles reminiscent of Rivera, and Stackpole himself was portrayed in five of them; in one he is shown reading a newspaper announcing the destruction of a Rivera mural in New York.

In 1937, Stackpole received a commission to sculpt his interpretation of Colorado River explorer John Wesley Powell, for display in the Main Interior Building of the U.S. Department of Interior. It was to be a companion piece to Heinz Warneke's portrayal of the Lewis and Clark Expedition. Warneke learned that Stackpole intended a water scene, so he changed his portrayal of Lewis and Clark to be one of them on land. Stackpole and Warneke delivered their stone reliefs in 1940, and the two panels were mounted on either side of the stage of the building's auditorium. Another work of Stockpole's, "Dispossessed," one of his most notable canvases and a painting of great power and (unfortunately but apparently) permanent relevance, is also in Washington, D.C., at the Smithsonian.

=== "Reverence" ===
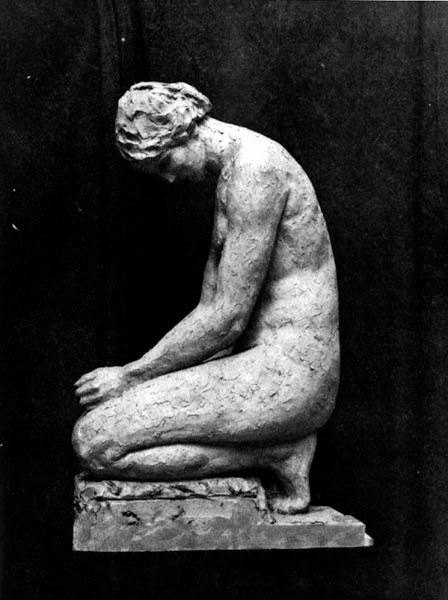
original 1915 version of Reverence

In 1938, Stackpole was contacted by the President of the United States, Franklin Delano Roosevelt. While visiting the 1915 fair, in San Francisco, as Assistant Secretary of the Navy, FDR had seen Stackpole's figure of Reverence, also known as Worship, on the long-gone altar at the Palace of Fine Arts. It had stuck in his mind somehow. He wanted one. Stackpole responded that the original had deteriorated, and was lost, but that he would be happy to undertake another version in travertine as a commission. FDR agreed, with regular inquiries on the progress of the piece over the next five years. In April 1943, Stackpole explained the result about to be revealed:

The changes of 28 years, in the world, in you, and in me, made the exact copying or reproduction of the first statue unattractive... So I did the job as I would do it now... here are a few things I thought of when I was working. Big mass movements in thinking and labor naturally reflect in art. The slender and graceful belong less to us now. I’ve tried to make heavy and strong forms. She is more bent and the burden heavier.

This was not what the President had remembered or wanted. He ordered it to a secluded area of Hyde Park, where it was re-discovered in 1987, identified, then concealed all over again within a new ring of trees according to FDR's wishes.

=== Golden Gate International Exposition ===
The eight-story-tall figure of Pacifica was the central spirit of the Golden Gate International Exposition.

Pflueger made certain that Stackpole was given a major commission for art in preparation for the Golden Gate International Exposition, also called the Pacific Pageant, a world's fair to be held on Treasure Island between San Francisco and Oakland. Stackpole worked to create an 80-foot (24 m) tall frame-and-stucco embodiment of Pacifica, the theme of the exposition. By November 1938, when Life photographer Alfred Eisenstaedt was capturing images to promote the event, Pacifica was ready for his camera. The magazine carried the image of this, Stackpole's most monumental work, "a peaceful, contemplative, almost prayer-like female figure" intended only for temporary placement. The heroic sculpture stood in front of a 100-foot (30 m) tall "prayer curtain" of regular star-shaped steel bangles that rippled in the wind. Vivid orange and blue lights washed the curtain at night, while Pacifica, the image of Peace, was brilliant in white. Over two years, 16 million visitors came to the exposition. When it was over, Stackpole proposed that the sculpture be recast in a more permanent form—steel, stone or concrete—and positioned prominently on an island in the San Francisco Bay, perhaps Alcatraz or Angel Island, in a manner similar to the Statue of Liberty in New York Harbor.The plan was not seriously considered by civic leaders whose attention was on the gathering war clouds in Asia and Europe. The sculpture and most of the exposition buildings were dynamited in 1942, and the U.S. Navy took ownership of the island as a base in World War II.

== Later life ==
Artist Louise Gilbert rendered this flyer advertising a sculpture class Stackpole was to give in 1945 at the California Labor School.

In the early 1940s, Stackpole left the CSFA to teach privately. In April 1945, he led a sculpting class at the California Labor School, a leftist organization advocating equal rights for workers. From 1941 to 1945, he served on the U.S. Commission of Fine Arts, the first commission member from the West Coast.

In 1949, Stackpole moved to Chauriat in the Puy-de-Dôme area of central France, returning with his second wife Ginette to her birthplace. There, his art became less figurative and more abstract, both in sculpture and in painting. He kept a flow of correspondence with his old friends in San Francisco, including Helen Salz, who described his letters as devoid of any mention of sculpture or painting, or any project that Stackpole might have been working on—instead, he wrote of musicians and music, and of his encounters with people. Salz bought a Stackpole bust of poet George Sterling and donated it to the University of California in 1955–56, to be displayed in Dwinelle Hall. In early 1964, Stackpole visited San Francisco to see his family, and he called up his old friend Kenneth Rexroth. In his San Francisco Examiner newspaper column, Rexroth wrote of having lunch with the Stackpole family, and reminded his readers that the man had been known "for 20 years or more [as] San Francisco's leading artist."

Stackpole died in France in 1973, his wife in 1978.

Some of Stackpole's sculptures, paintings and drawings were destroyed in the Oakland firestorm of 1991, a blaze which leveled the home of Peter Stackpole. Floyd Winter, a neighbor, helped rescue a very few items "moments before the conflagration consumed the house".

== Selected works ==
- 1915—Venus, Altar of Inspiration, Palace of Fine Arts
- 1927-William Coleman Memorial Fountain, Sacramento, California
- 1928–1932—figures carved in Yosemite granite at the San Francisco Stock Exchange (301 Pine) and Tower (155 Sansome) including Bountiful Earth (also known as Mother Earth and Agriculture) and Industry (1931) (also known as Man and His Invention)
- 1930—the proscenium ceiling panel at Oakland's Paramount Theatre
- 1934—mural at Coit Tower: Industries of California (left and right halves)
- 1938–1939—figures at the Golden Gate International Exposition including the heroic embodiment of the Exposition, the 80-foot (24 m) tall frame-and-stucco figure of Pacifica
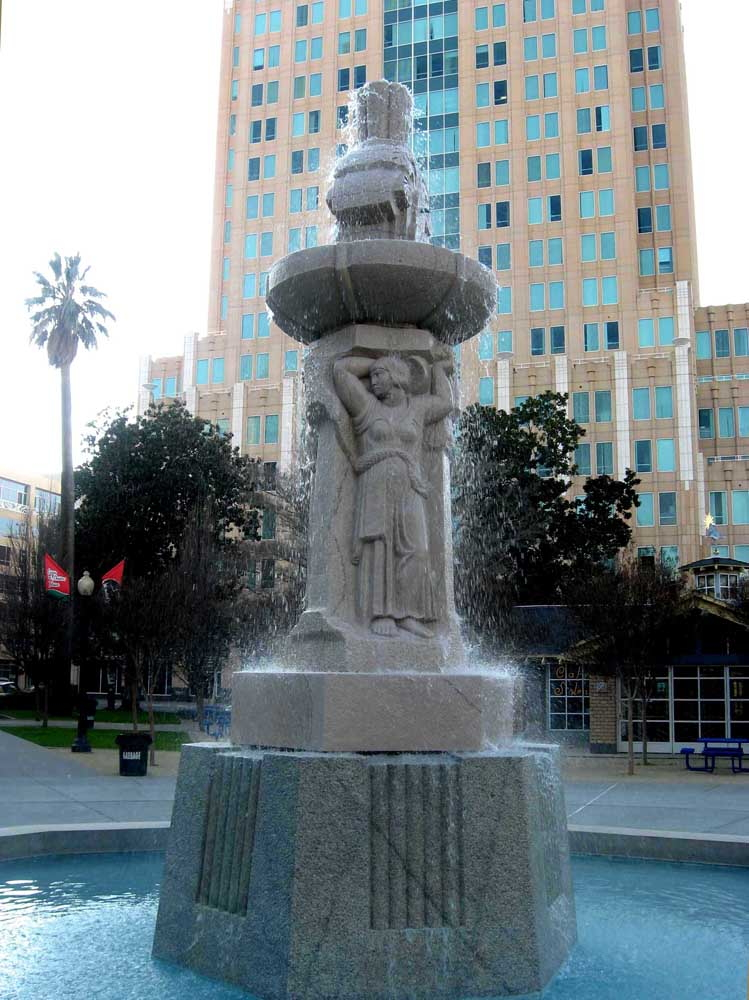
William Coleman Memorial Fountain, Sacramento, California

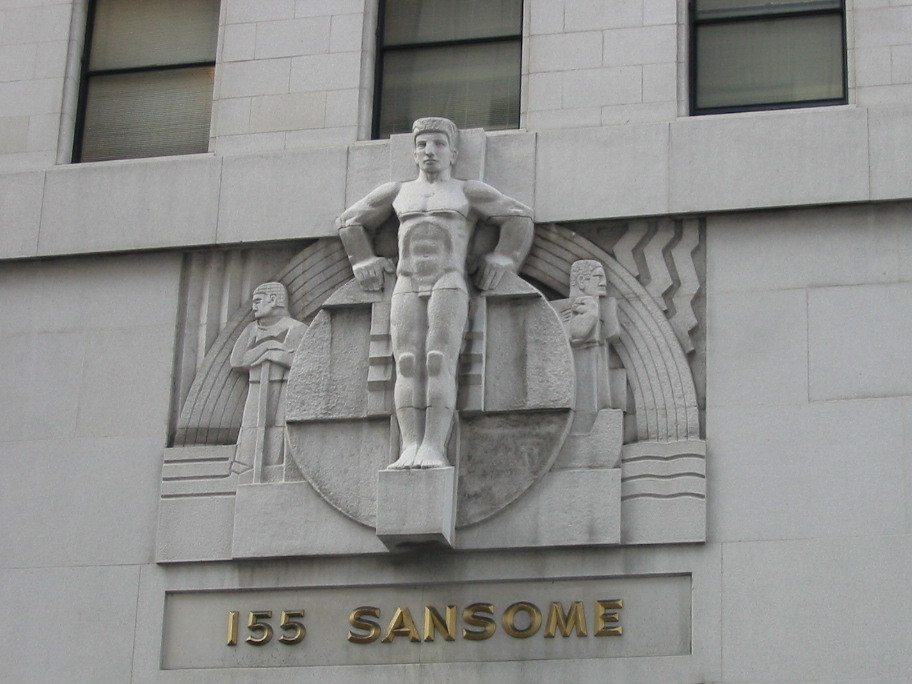
Stackpole's heroic figures were direct-carved in situ on a scaffold over the entrance of the Stock Exchange Tower

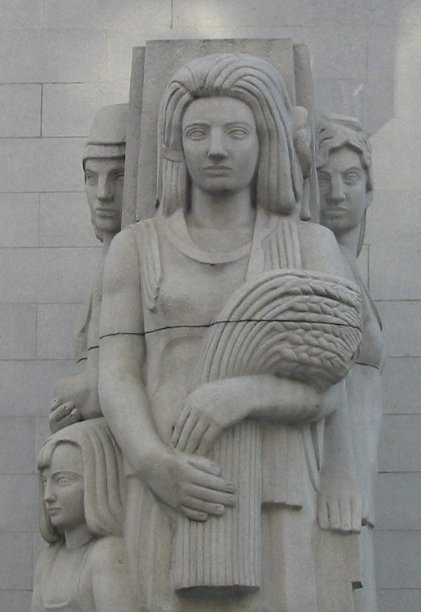
Detail of Bountiful Earth (1932). This and two other Stackpole sculpture groups were unveiled outside of the San Francisco Stock Exchange on December 31, 1932

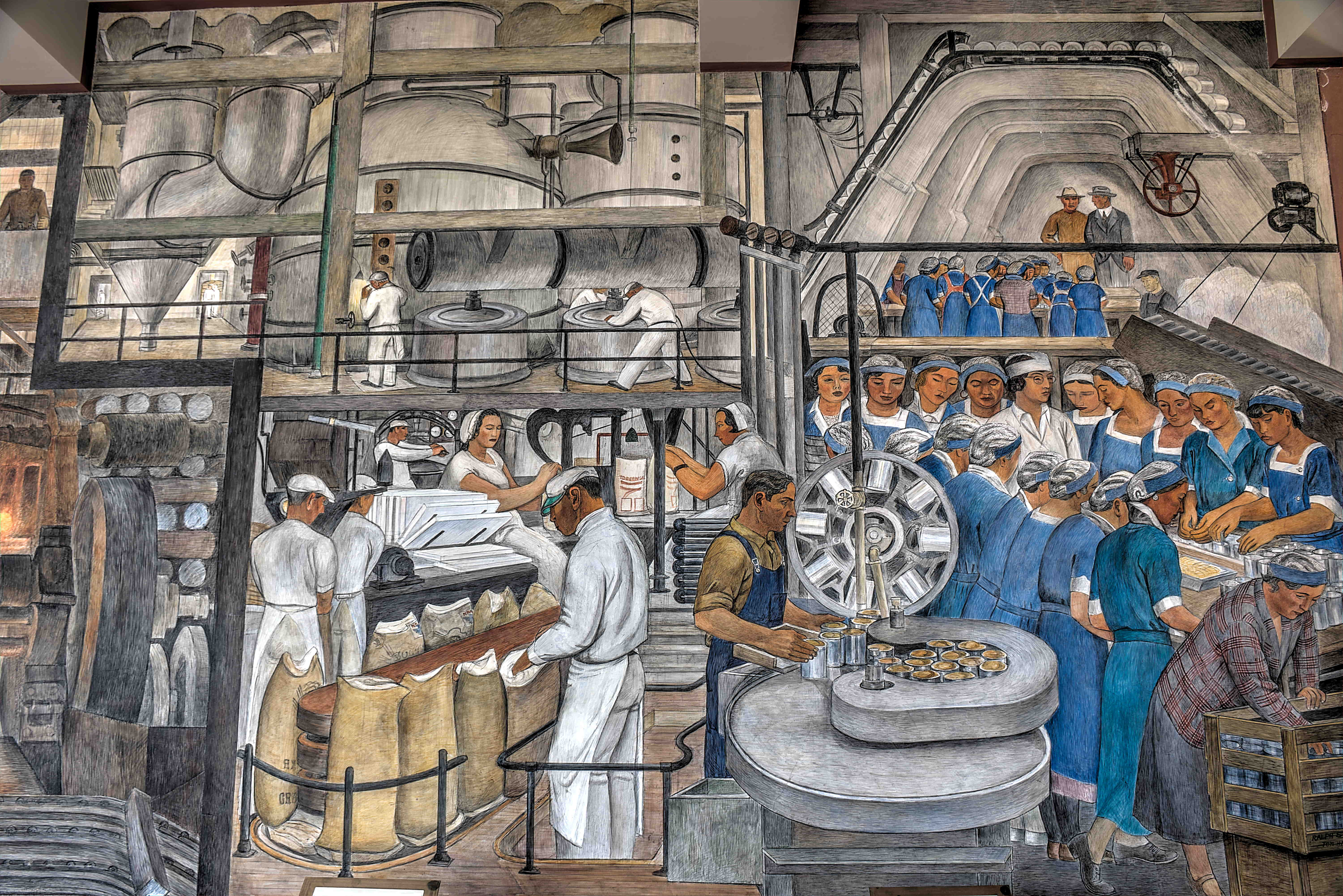
Industries of California mural at Coit Tower

== See also ==
- Beniamino Bufano
- Frederick E. Olmsted
