= G7th Capo Company =

G7th The Capo Company Ltd
- Company type: Limited
- Industry: Guitar Capos
- Founded: 2004
- Headquarters: Peterborough, UK
- Key people: Nick Campling, Noel Sheehan
- Products: Guitar Capos
- Website: www.g7th.com

G7th Ltd is a manufacturer of guitar capos based in Peterborough, United Kingdom. As of 2017 there are five distinct ranges of G7th Capos.

== History ==
The company was founded in 2004 and released its first capo product "Performance" in April of the same year. The "Performance 2" capo was launched in 2014 to positive reviews.

== Accolades ==
In 2009, the company was awarded the Queen's Award for Enterprise, and has won successive Players' Awards from Acoustic Guitar mag. In July 2019, the company won the European Product Design Award for the "Performance 3" capo.

== Use by professionals ==
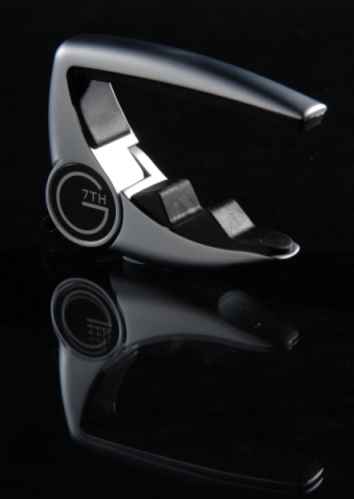
The G7th "Performance" capo which uses a wrap spring clutch

G7th capos are used by professional musicians including Richard Thompson, Bryan Adams, The Kooks, KT Tunstall, Marcus Mumford, Roger McGuinn, Catfish and the Bottlemen. Blues musician Eric Clapton, uses a G7th capo on "Sessions for Robert Johnson".
