= Rod Johnson =

Rod Johnson may refer to:

- Rod Johnson (footballer) (1945–2019), English retired football player
- Rod Johnson (Oregon politician), former Oregon state legislator
- Rod Johnson (Nebraska politician)
- Rod Johnson (programmer), founder of the Spring Framework, an open source application framework for Java

== See also ==
- Rodney Johnson (disambiguation)
