= Linc Blakely =

American baseball player (1912–1976)

- Outfielder
- Born: February 12, 1912; Oakland, California, U.S.
- Died: September 28, 1976 (aged 64); Oakland, California, U.S.
- Batted: Right Threw: Right

MLB debut
- April 29, 1934, for the Cincinnati Reds

Last MLB appearance
- June 27, 1934, for the Cincinnati Reds

MLB statistics
- Batting average: .225
- Home runs: 0
- Runs batted in: 10
- Stats at Baseball Reference

Teams
- Cincinnati Reds (1934)

Lincoln Howard Blakely (February 12, 1912 – September 28, 1976) was an American outfielder in Major League Baseball. He grew up in Oakland, California and attended Oakland Technical High School. He played for the Cincinnati Reds.
