= University High School (Oakland, California) =

Public high school

- U.S. National Register of Historic Places
- Oakland Designated Landmark
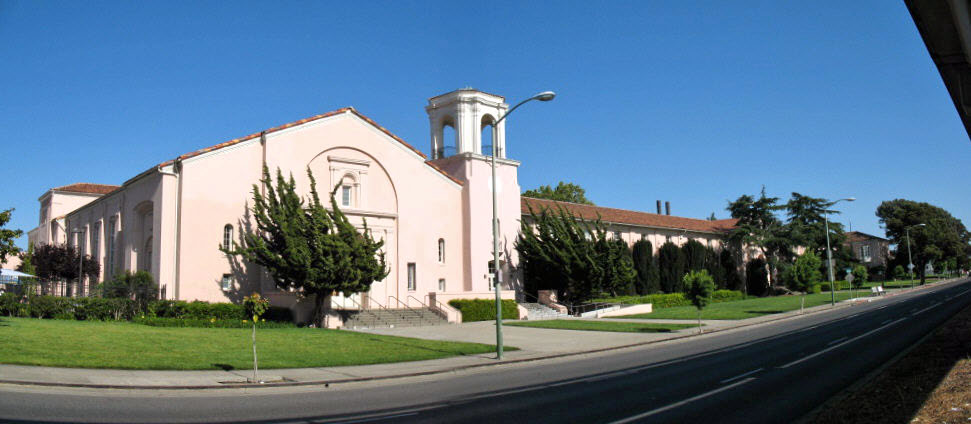

- Location within Oakland, California Location within California Location within the United States
- Location: 5714 Martin Luther King Jr. Way, Oakland, California
- Coordinates: 37°50′33″N 122°16′10″W
- Area: 9 acres (3.6 ha)
- Built: 1922
- Architects: Dickey, Charles W.; Littlefield, R.W.
- Architectural style: Mission/Spanish Revival, Spanish Colonial Revival
- NRHP reference No.: 92001300
- ODL No.: 117
- Added to NRHP: October 02, 1992

University High School was a public high school serving the northwestern portion of Oakland, California. It originally opened in 1923 at what was 5714 Grove Street. Due to the proximity of the campus to the City of Berkeley, "UNI" gained the reputation of the "feeder" high school of Oakland of students directly to the University of California. The high school was closed following World War II in 1948.

In 1954, the campus was converted into first location of Oakland City College, which later became Merritt College. Merritt College moved to its new campus in 1967. In the early 1970s the location temporarily became a high school again, as Oakland Technical High School moved its students into the campus while its normal location was retrofitted for earthquake safety. At the time, many called this site "Old Tech," although Oakland Tech was actually opened at its current location in 1914, before University High School.

After the "Tech" students moved back to their original campus, the building remained vacant for several years. At one point, it was used as the filming location for the 1987 film The Principal.

The location has been rehabilitated and is now shared between the Children's Hospital Oakland Research Institute and the North Oakland Senior Center. Grove Street was subsequently renamed Martin Luther King Jr. Way. This site was added to the National Register of Historic Places in 1992.

Among its notable alumni is 1936 Olympic 400 meters Gold Medalist Archie Williams and his classmate, tennis great Don Budge .
