= William Coleman Memorial Fountain =

Coordinates: 38°34′52″N 121°29′38″W

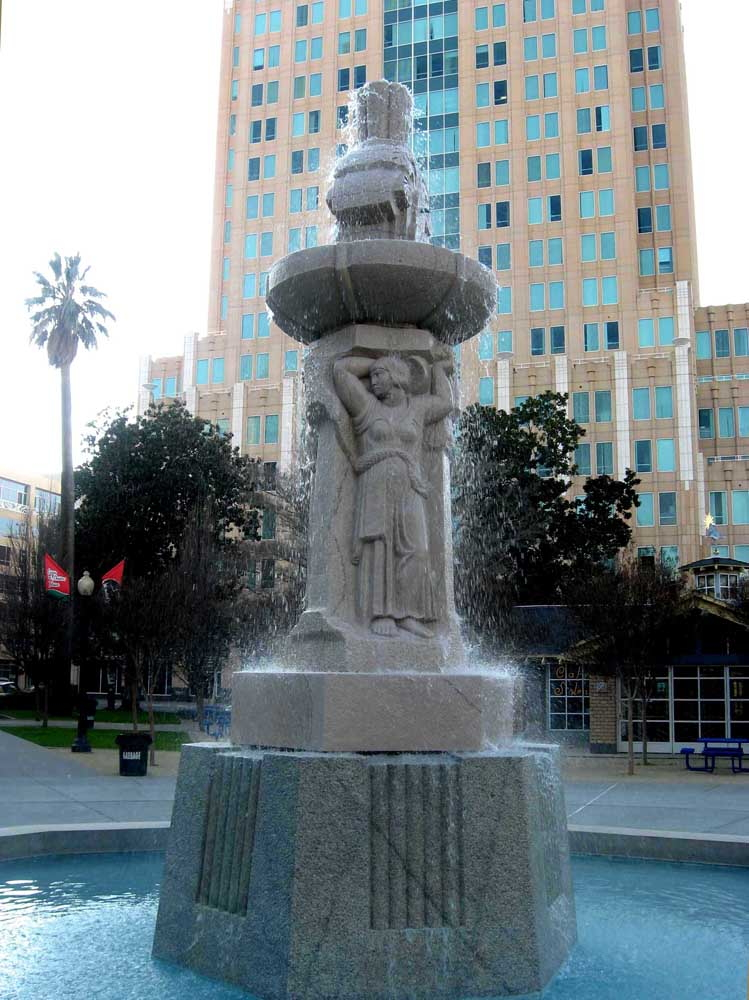

The William Coleman Memorial Fountain is a stone fountain created by sculptor Ralph Stackpole and located in Cesar Chavez Plaza at 10th and J streets in Sacramento, California.

Florence Coleman bequeathed $30,000 to the city of Sacramento with which to erect a fountain in the memory of her late husband, William Coleman. Her chosen sculptor, Amanda Austin, was picked in 1916 to create it; but she died a year later, and it was another decade before Stackpole's work was unveiled.

The fountain consists of bas-reliefs of three native female figures who represent the three main rivers of the area—the Sacramento, the American and the Feather.

The work was commissioned from Stackpole in 1924 and dedicated on February 26, 1927. The style used by Stackpole was influenced by his admiration of the work of the Mexican artists Jose Orozco, Diego Rivera and Frida Kahlo.
