= Peter Stackpole =

American photojournalist (1913–1997)

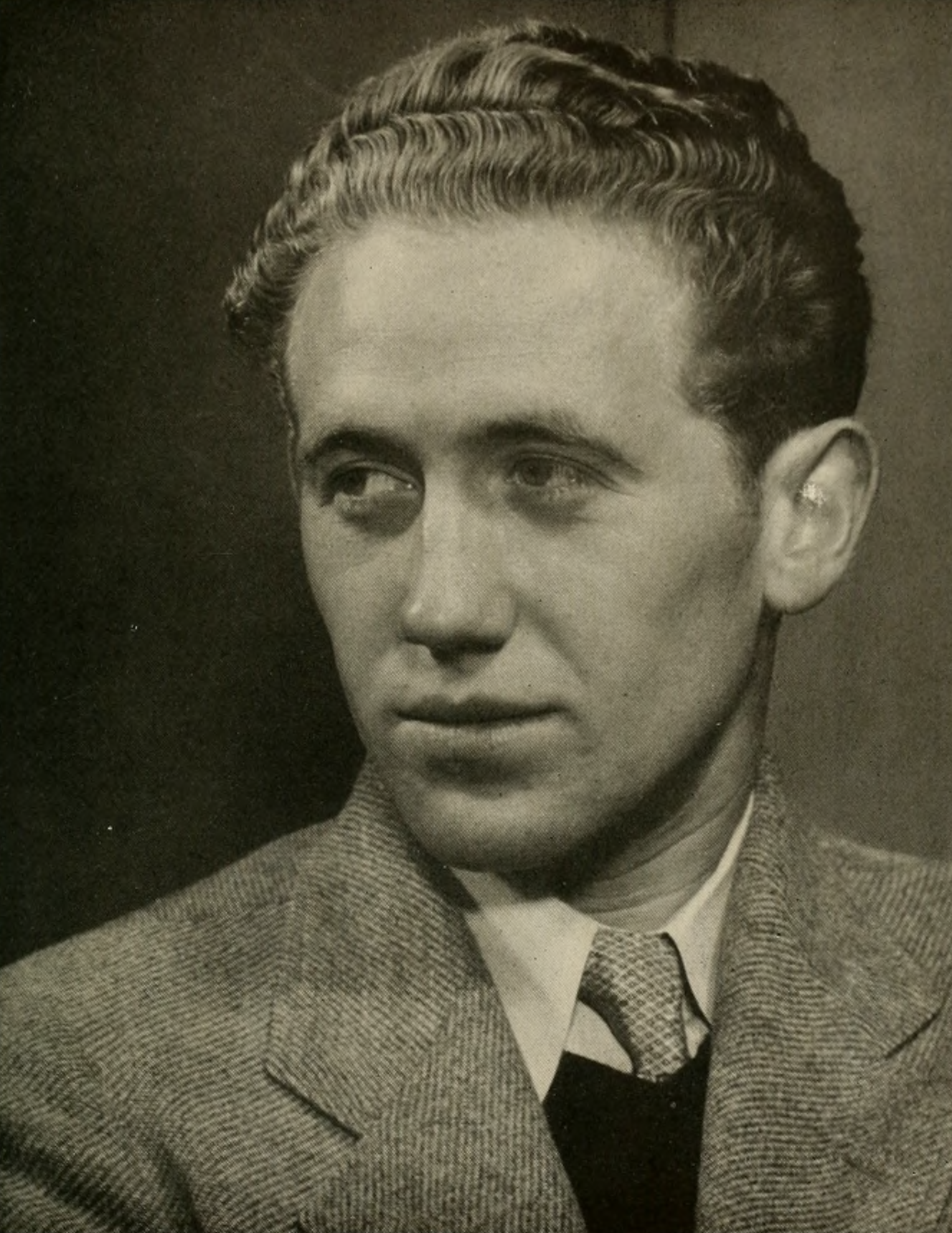
- Stackpole c. 1937
- Born: June 15, 1913; San Francisco, California
- Died: May 11, 1997 (aged 83); Novato, California
- Education: Oakland Technical High School
- Occupation: Photojournalist
- Awards: George Polk Award (1953)

Peter Stackpole (June 15, 1913 – May 11, 1997) was an American photojournalist. He was one of Life magazine's first staff photographers and remained with the publication until 1961. Stackpole shot 26 cover portraits for the magazine.

He first gained notice for his photos of bridge construction in the San Francisco Bay in the 1930s. Hired by Life magazine, he captured many notable snapshots of film stars in the 1940s and 1950s. During World War II, his combat camera work during the Battle of Saipan was praised. He won a George Polk Award in 1953 for a photograph of a diver 100 feet under water, and he taught photography at the Academy of Art University. He also wrote a column in U.S. Camera for fifteen years. He was the son of sculptor Ralph Stackpole.

== Early life ==
Peter Stackpole was born at St. Francis Memorial Hospital in San Francisco in 1913 to sculptor Ralph Stackpole and painter/designer Adele Barnes who had married in 1912. In 1922, the Stackpoles moved to Paris where the marriage fell apart from the father's adultery. Ralph Stackpole left Paris with artist's model Francine "Ginette" Mazen, returning to San Francisco, the two eventually marrying in Mexico. Peter and his mother stayed in Paris while Stackpole continued his schoolwork at École alsacienne and a primary school in the 14th arrondissement of Paris through the first half of 1924. After she agreed to a divorce, Stackpole's mother moved herself and her son to Oakland, California.

An unknown boxer at left fights Max Baer in 1933. Working as an apprentice for Oakland's Post-Enquirer newspaper, Stackpole used only available light to snap this photograph, his camera set for a slow exposure at ASA 20. The newspaper editors refused to run the photo because it was blurry, and it would use too much black ink; Stackpole was dismissed from his unpaid position. Later observers praised the snapshot's composition and drama.

Stackpole attended Oakland Technical High School and developed an interest in photography. His first camera was a compact Agfa Memo hobbyist model, but his second was the well-made Leica Model A that he used more seriously. He apprenticed to the photographer of Oakland's Post-Enquirer newspaper in 1931. His small format 35mm Leica allowed him to capture more action as it unfolded than the other newspaper photographers who preferred larger film cameras mounted on tripods for their higher quality. His 1933 ringside snapshot of prizefighter Max Baer was rejected by the newspaper editors because it was blurry, unposed, taken only with available light.

As the only child of well-connected artists, Stackpole met famous people such as American photographers Dorothea Lange and Edward Weston, and Mexican painters Frida Kahlo and Diego Rivera; Rivera painted an image of teen-aged Stackpole playing with a model airplane into his mural titled Allegory of California (1931). Stackpole was driven by his father to visit with Weston in Carmel-by-the-Sea, where Stackpole listened to Weston speak of the intention and composition behind the photograph which makes it art. In 1932, Stackpole was exposed to more fine art photography at the De Young Museum which was exhibiting works by Weston, Ansel Adams, Imogen Cunningham, Willard Van Dyke and other photographers associated with Group f/64 in San Francisco. This experience gave Stackpole more motivation to put intention and composition into his photography.

Stackpole's candid photo of ex-president Herbert Hoover dozing off in 1934 during a commencement speech delivered by Secretary of Labor Frances Perkins was refused by publisher William F. Knowland of the Oakland Tribune, but it was purchased by Time magazine, and it led to freelance work.

== Bridge construction ==
At the age of 20 in 1933, Stackpole began documenting the construction of the Golden Gate Bridge and the San Francisco–Oakland Bay Bridge with his hand-held Leica. He captured images of iron workers in action and at rest, and took stunning vistas from the tops of the bridge towers. In 1934, his bridge photography was recognized by Willard Van Dyke, who granted Stackpole honorary membership in Group f/64, despite Stackpole's more dynamic hand-held photojournalist style. Twenty-five of Stackpole's bridge photos were exhibited in 1935 at the San Francisco Museum of Modern Art, cementing Stackpole's reputation. At the suggestion of Imogen Cunningham, Stackpole submitted his photos to Vanity Fair magazine which published two pages of them in July 1935. The magazine U.S. Camera also published his bridge construction shots, and Ansel Adams included them in the 1940 multi-artist collective exhibition he curated called A Pageant of Photography, shown to millions of visitors at the Golden Gate International Exposition in the middle of the San Francisco Bay.

In a return to high steel work in April 1951, Life magazine published Stackpole's photos of the construction of Delaware Memorial Bridge, in a photo essay titled "High Steel". Stackpole released a book of his bridge photos in 1984 through Pomegranate Artbooks, titled The Bridge Builders: Photographs and Documents of the Raising of the San Francisco Bay Bridge, 1934–1936, with text written by Anita Mozley of Stanford University Museum of Art.

== Life magazine ==
As a result of the Vanity Fair photo essay, Stackpole was brought into Henry Luce's new conception of Life magazine as a weekly photojournal starting in November 1936. Stackpole was one of the first four staff photographers hired by Luce, alongside Alfred Eisenstaedt, Margaret Bourke-White, and Thomas McAvoy. Based on the West Coast of the United States, Stackpole was called upon many times to cover events in California. He moved to Los Angeles and attended parties in Hollywood for filmmakers and film stars, in the process capturing famous images of Alfred Hitchcock, Gary Cooper, Vivien Leigh, Greer Garson, Elizabeth Taylor, Douglas Fairbanks Jr, Ingrid Bergman, Judy Garland, Mickey Rooney, Orson Welles, Rita Hayworth and more. His photographic style was casual, often showing his subjects relaxing at home, having fun with their families.

=== Underwater photography ===
In August 1941, Stackpole was assigned to shoot actor Errol Flynn swimming and sailing his 74-foot ketch, Sirocco, off the coast of Catalina in Southern California, and he was instructed to take underwater photos of Flynn hunting fish with a speargun. Stackpole brought his "oldest, most expendable" Leica camera to the job, encased in a clear plastic box to make it temporarily waterproof. Stackpole later wrote, "I used to be a kind of beach bum between assignments, but it never occurred to me to take underwater pictures." He climbed higher on the mast of the yacht to take a notable picture of Flynn below him looking upward, the boat deck and sea underneath. This photo has been reproduced many times, including for the LIFE. Hollywood compendium of 2024. Stackpole's plastic box, constructed by a friend, protected the camera under water for about 15 spearfishing and swimming shots, then it flooded.

This assignment occurred during a period of upheaval in Flynn's life. Flynn was charged with raping a 15-year-old girl named Peggy Satterlee that day on the yacht, and Stackpole was called as a witness in the court case. Stackpole was worried that the defense attorneys would fabricate evidence against Stackpole, implying that Stackpole may have raped Satterlee while driving her home from the yacht. This tactic did not emerge; Stackpole related on the witness stand that Flynn and Satterlee were belowdecks together for some hours, and that Satterlee seemed angry at Flynn during the car ride home. Despite this and other evidence against him, Flynn was acquitted by a sympathetic jury.

In 1953, Stackpole fashioned his own underwater camera housing out of thick plexiglas. He used this device to capture the diver Hope Root attempting a new depth record for scuba diving. Root died at a depth of 500 ft (150 m) under water, while Stackpole was waiting with other divers at the 50-foot mark. Stackpole's final image of Root alive was when the diver was 100 feet down. Root's fatal record attempt was documented in Life in early December 1953. For his feat of underwater photography, Stackpole was awarded the George Polk Memorial Award. Afterward, he continued to experiment with underwater camera designs, creating prototypes in his basement workshop.

=== Battle of Saipan ===
During World War II, Stackpole went to the Pacific Theatre for Life magazine, attached to the United States Navy. He documented a US Marine base at Funafuti atoll, and survived Japanese air raids against the base. He took combat photos at Tarawa in November 1943. His most prominent wartime work was at the Battle of Saipan in June–July 1944 with Life staff writer Robert Sherrod, the two joined after the fighting by photographer W. Eugene Smith. Some of Stackpole's combat photos of Saipan were published in early July, more shots of "mopping up" operations appeared in the magazine at the end of July, and then Sherrod's full account was published a month later with photos from Smith and Stackpole. Stackpole wrote that Life photo editor Wilson Hicks was in the habit of "pitting photographer against photographer", which is how Smith came to surprise Stackpole and Sherrod by showing up at the same battlefield. During his time on Saipan, Stackpole survived an attack by a single Japanese soldier emerging from a cave, and he lived through a 3,000-man counterattack on the American position by the Japanese Imperial Army. Life published a photo of Stackpole sheltering in a foxhole with Chicago Tribune war correspondent Harold P. Smith.

Stackpole was one of three American journalists to discover mass suicides by civilians in Saipan. On July 11, Stackpole and two newspapermen – Keith Wheeler of the Chicago Daily Times and Frank R. Kelley of the New York Herald Tribune – reported to the US military that about 4,000 civilians and fleeing Japanese soldiers were massing at Marpi Point, Saipan's northern tip. Hundreds of these people had killed themselves, and many more were expected to follow suit. The next day, Sherrod and Stackpole accompanied interpreters from the US Marines carrying loudspeakers to Marpi Point, to observe the attempts by American military men to stop the suicides and induce surrender. Some civilians were saved, some chose suicide, and a few were killed by Japanese snipers. The photos of this tragedy ran with Sherrod's article in late August. Because of this event, the highest bluff at Marpi Point is now called Suicide Cliff.

== Personal life ==
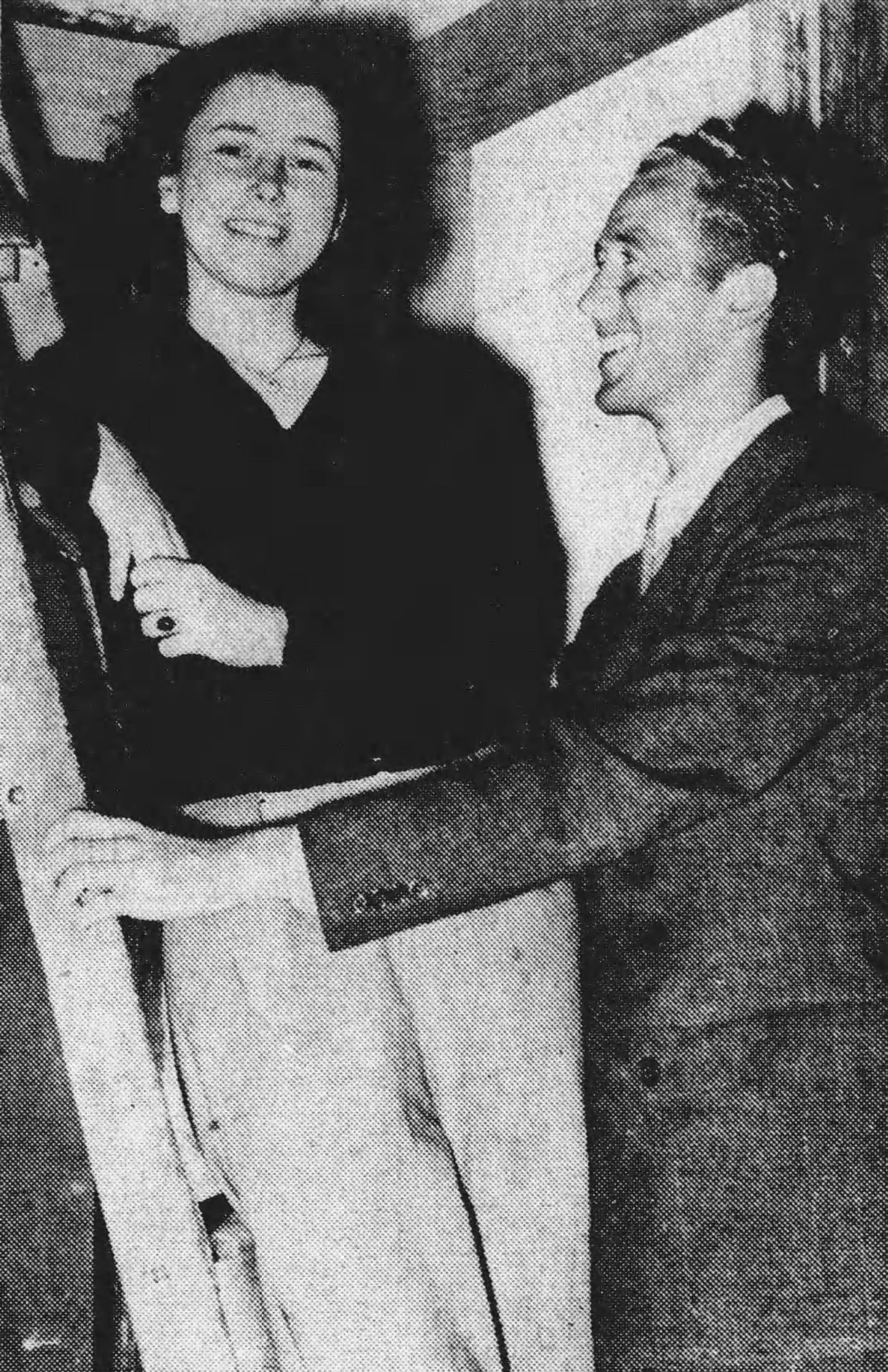
Stackpole with Daum in 1937

Stackpole married Dutch-born artist Hebe Daum in 1937. One year his senior, she was a photographer, muralist and painter known for her New Deal artwork as an assistant to Suzanne Scheuer. While living in Los Angeles, their daughter Katharine was born in 1941, another daughter Trena (known as Anne) in 1946, and their son Timothy was born in 1949. In 1951, Stackpole shifted to Life magazine's New York office, and the family took up residence in nearby Darien, Connecticut. Upon retiring in 1961, Stackpole returned to live in the Oakland Hills with his wife. After losing their home to fire, the Stackpoles moved to Novato, California, where Hebe died in 1993.

Stackpole taught photography for many years at Academy of Art College.

In 1991, Stackpole assisted the Oakland Museum of California in assembling a double gallery showing of his photographs, including a section titled "Peacetime to Wartime" and a section called "Mr. Stackpole Goes to Hollywood". During this effort, in October the Oakland firestorm of 1991 destroyed his home including the majority of his prints and negatives. Stackpole narrowly escaped the fire carrying 50 of his Saipan photos; other saved prints include those that were already at the museum, and the ones that had been used to create the new photo book Peter Stackpole, Life in Hollywood 1936–1952. In the fire, Stackpole lost all of his cameras, his notes from thousands of assignments, and all of his color photographs. Some 50 paintings by his wife burned in the conflagration, and various sculptures by his father Ralph Stackpole were destroyed. Stackpole had begun to work on his planned autobiography, titled Go Get 'Em, Tiger, but the papers burned. He resumed work on but never completed the book. In Novato, he died in May 1997 of congestive heart failure.
