= Partial capo =

Musical device to fret only certain strings

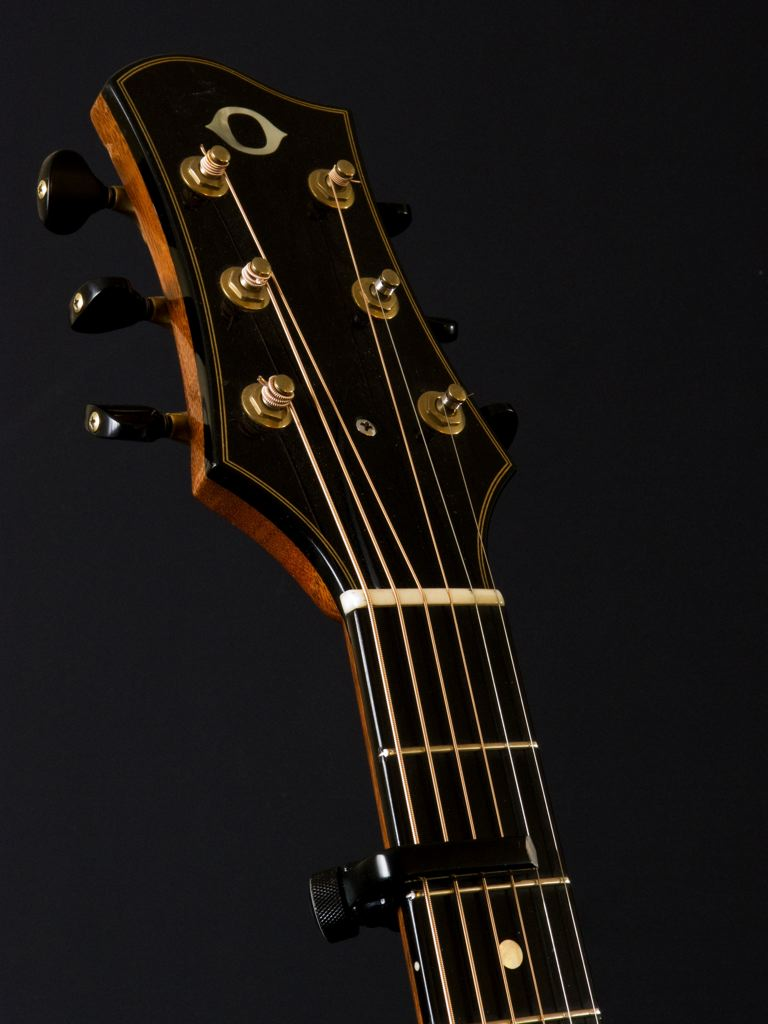
A four-string partial capo on the second fret. The open strings are now F♯BEABE.

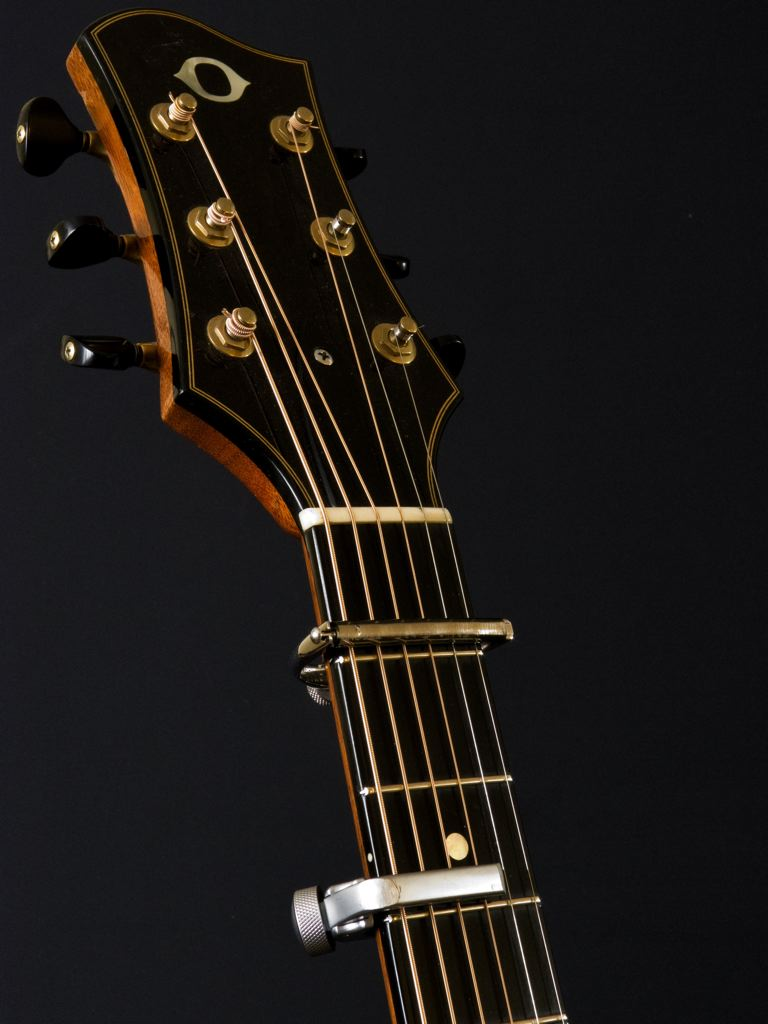
A regular capo on the first fret and a four-string partial capo on the third fret. The open strings are now GCFB♭CF.

Two uses of a four-string partial capo: first, by itself, second, in conjunction with a regular capo.

A partial capo is a device that shortens the playable length of some of the strings on a musical instrument, as opposed to a standard capo which affects all of the strings.

A partial capo may appear to have a similar effect to alternate tunings, but there are differences. A common example is a capo, which covers the top five strings of a guitar, leaving the bass E string not capoed. When played at the second fret, this appears to create a drop D tuning (where the bass E string is tuned to a D) raised one full tone in pitch. In fact, these are often marketed as "drop D capos". However, this affects only the open tuning of the strings, and thus, when used at the second fret, an E chord using the "D shape" will have the "Drop D sound" with a low E note. However, a G-shape chord can be played as well, as the fretted E string will not be affected as it would be if the string were retuned.

== Background ==
Various kinds of partial capos

A capo is a tool which clamps across all the strings of a string instrument to raise the pitch of all the strings. This is done to achieve a brighter timbre or to transpose the music to a higher key. Guitarists have also used many alternate tunings to change the pitch of the open (unfretted) strings.

Recently, guitarists have begun to use capos that only clamp some of the strings, usually called a "partial capo", which offer similar options to guitarists as alternate tunings, with drone strings and new chord voicings. Although partial capos are most commonly used in standard tuning, creating "simulated" open tunings, they are also used in combination with many different tunings, and are also combined with other full and partial capos. A number of manufacturers incorrectly call them "open tuning" capos. What they do for the guitar resembles what a tuning does, but the open strings are changed by varying the length of the strings and not the pitch.

== Origins ==
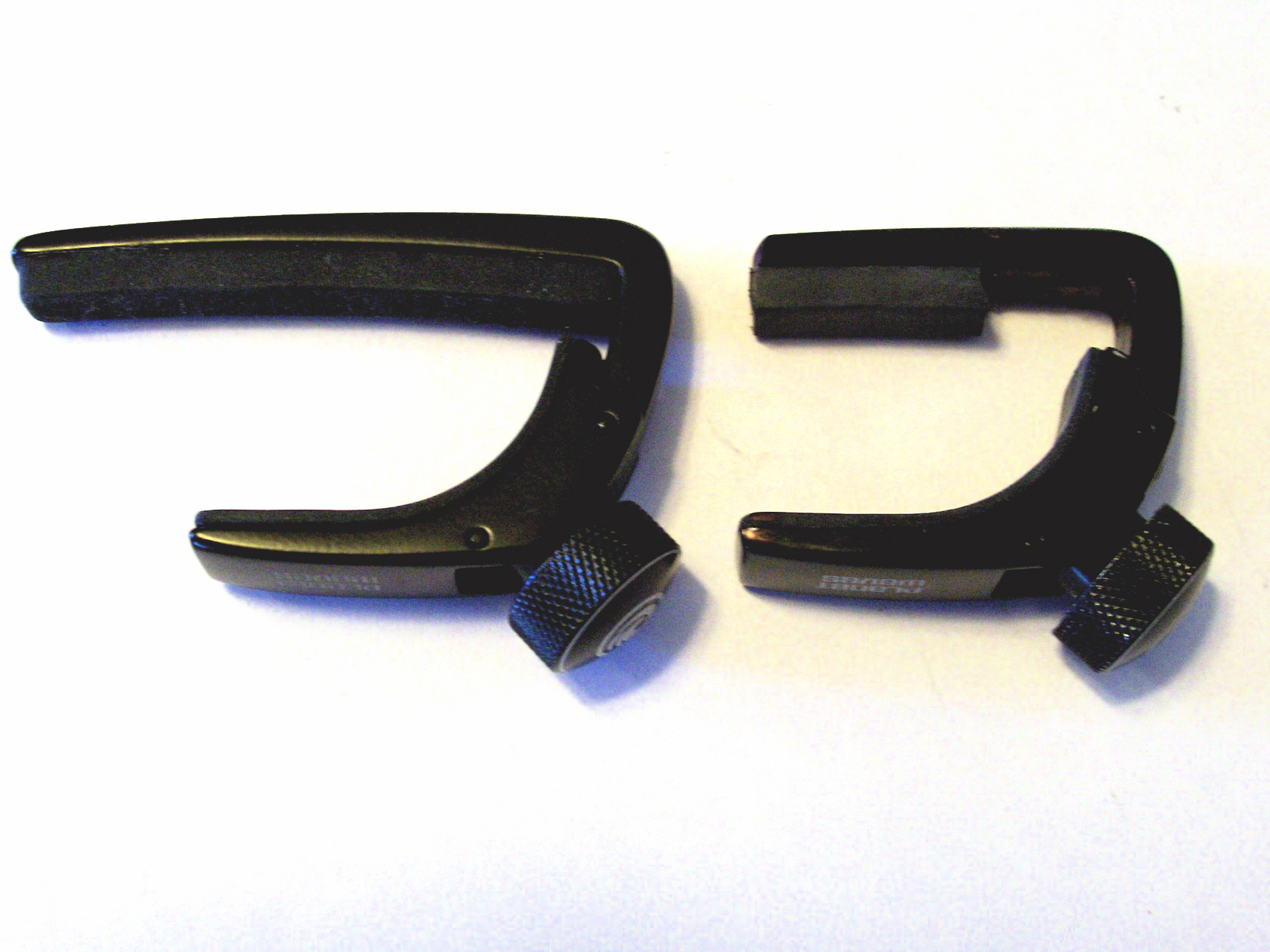
A six-string Planet Waves capo and a homemade "cut" version

A device similar to the partial capo surfaced in Europe in the early 19th century, but that seems to have died out and is likely unconnected to contemporary partial capo use. Modern use of the idea does not turn up before the 1960s. There are unconfirmed anecdotes from the 1960s and 1970s indicating that some people may have started to use some basic kinds of partial capos.

"5th string capos", commonly used by banjo players, are a type of partial capo.

== Manufacture ==
The first partial capo for guitar released, in 1976, was called the "Chord-Forming Capo". It was invented by Lyle Shabram and called "A Tool For the Creative Musician". Harvey Reid and Jeff Hickey started the Third Hand Capo Co. in Nashville, renaming Shabram's invention "Third Hand Capo". A popular style of partial capo is the "Esus" style, which clamps the A, D, and G strings of a guitar. When placed upon the second fret, it forms an Esus chord, and when turned upside down, it forms an A chord. There are many partial capos on the market today that clamp anywhere from 1 to 5 strings. Many musicians have made their own partial capos by cutting or otherwise modifying existing capos.

The Third Hand Capo and the SpiderCapo (appearing in 2008) are the only universal capos. Each can clamp any of the 63 combinations of strings at any fret of any guitar. Only the SpiderCapo can produce any combination at a given fret without repositioning the capo. Shubb and Kyser each make a 3-string "E-sus" capo as well as a 5-string "Drop-E" capo. Woodie's G-Band capos clamp 1 or 2 outer strings, and Kyser now makes a series of "K-Lever" capos that incorporate a spring lever to allow temporary fretting of some notes that lie under the capo.

== Harvey Reid ==
Guitarist and songwriter Harvey Reid is a prominent partial capo popularizer. He pioneered most of the known capo configurations, wrote books, and composed and recorded songs using a partial capo.

Reid published a book in 1980, A New Frontier in Guitar, detailing 25 ways to use a Third Hand Capo, at the time the only partial capo on the market. Reid recorded 2 albums in 1982 and 1983 in Washington DC, which were the first commercial recordings to use the partial capo, and he published the Duck Soup Guitar book in 1982, which was the first published use of the partial capo in music education. Sleight of Hand: Guitar Magic followed in 1983, and was the first book of solo guitar arrangements for partial capoed guitar. Both books are still in print. Reid also co-wrote the first college textbook for folk guitar, Modern Folk Guitar, which has been in print since 1984 and is used in university music education and music therapy programs. It contains a chapter on using the partial capo for beginning guitar.
