= Shubb =

American capo company

- Type: Private Company
- Industry: Music instrument manufacture
- Founded: California, United States (1974)
- Headquarters: Valley Ford, California, United States
- Key people: Rick Shubb (co-founder), Dave Coontz (co-founder)
- Products: Original Shubb Capo; Shubb Capo Noir; Shubb Deluxe Capo; Partial Capos; Fifth String Capo for Banjo; Capo for Dobro; GS Steel; Shubb-Pearse Steels; Robert Randolph Steels; Axys Reversible Guitar Slide; Talon Guitar Stand; String Winder; Transposing and Capo Placement Guide; Logo Clothing; Music Software
- Revenue: unknown
- Number of employees: Approximately 28
- Website: http://www.shubb.com

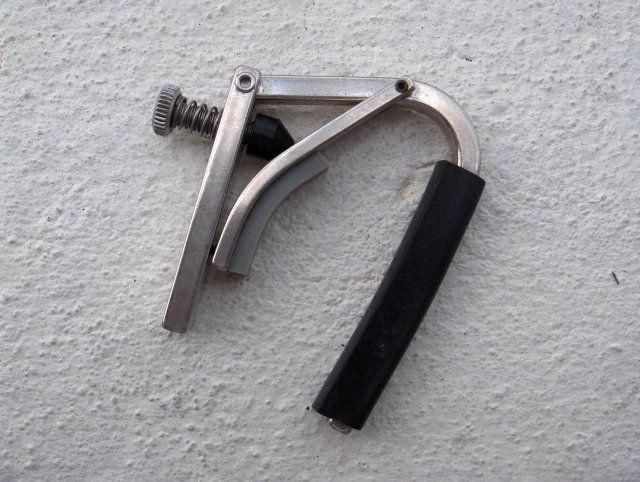
One of the 'original'-style Shubb capos

Shubb is a company that specialises in producing capos for all kinds of stringed instruments. The company was formed in 1974 by banjoists Rick Shubb and Dave Coontz. Shubb capos remain a top-selling capo forty years after their invention. Shubb wanted to create a capo that would not make his instrument go out of tune, which has resulted in ongoing efforts to refine his invention. Since 2016 at least 80% of Shubb's Capos are manufactured in China.

== Capo design ==
The Shubb Capo utilises an over-centre locking action, which is lever operated. The design includes a screw for adjusting the clamp's tightness, and has been described as "a turning point in modern capo design."

Shubb capos are available in variety of models to fit different types of guitars, banjos, dobros, and ukuleles. For example, there are Shubb Capos for Steel String Guitar which fit most acoustic and electric guitars; the Shubb Capos for Nylon String Guitar are designed for guitars with wide flat fretboards, etc. Furthermore, each model is available in different styles, namely Original (nickel-plated or plain, unplated brass), Capo Noir (black chrome) and Deluxe (stainless steel with improved roller design on the lever).

The Shubb capo was introduced at the 1980 NAMM Show, and became a favorite on the Usenet acoustic guitar newsgroup.

An advantage with using this type of capo is that it does not change the intonation in a way that makes the instrument difficult to tune, as it "mimics the grip of a human hand." A disadvantage is that the rubber sleeve may wear, and may need to be replaced.

The Shubb partial capos can be useful for playing fingerstyle guitar and for playing in alternate tunings.

The Shubb capo was featured in the 2007 Acoustic Guitar magazine's Player's Choice awards.

== Notable Shubb capo users ==
Notable users of the Shub capo include:

- Brian Setzer
- Keith Richards
- Pete Seeger
- Jerry Garcia
- Bruce Springsteen
- Doc Watson

== See also ==
- Capo
