= Rodney Joseph Johnson =

American police officer (1965–2006)

Rodney Joseph Johnson (October 24, 1965 - September 21, 2006) was a Houston Police officer who served 14 years with the agency prior to his death in the line of duty on September 21, 2006.

Johnson's murder by Juan Leonardo Quintero, a Mexican illegal immigrant who had previously been deported from the U.S. for sexually assaulting a girl but had returned, sparked a debate over illegal immigration and the incident "became a poster child for loose border enforcement." In 2008, Quintero was sentenced to life imprisonment for the crime.

== Early life ==
Rodney Johnson was born on October 25, 1965, to David E. Johnson and Cynthia Johnson in Houston, Texas. At age 14, Johnson moved to Oakland, California and attended school at Oakland Technical High School and graduated in 1984. After graduation, he enlisted in the U.S. Army and served six years.

== Law enforcement history ==
Johnson served as military policeman in the U.S. Army and a corrections officer with the Texas Department of Criminal Justice prior to joining the Houston Police Department in 1994. He was awarded two Lifesaving Awards from the Houston Police Department and the Medal of Valor from the state of Texas for his work in the Southeast Gang Task Force. After serving the Southeast Gang Task Force, he was then transferred to the Traffic Division, where he loved working until his death. His wife, Joslyn Johnson is also a Houston Police Sergeant.

== Line of duty death ==
On September 21, 2006, Johnson spotted a speeding vehicle doing 50 MPH in 30 MPH zone on Randolph Street near Braniff, near William P. Hobby Airport southeast of downtown. The speeding vehicle was a white Ford pickup truck operated by Juan Leonardo Quintero. Johnson pulled over Quintero for speeding and requested to see his driver's license. Quintero couldn't furnish a driver's license and Johnson decided to arrest him. Johnson handcuffed Quintero and performed a pat down search. After being handcuffed, Quintero was placed in the backseat of Johnson's police car. Johnson entered his patrol car and started writing a police report. While Johnson was writing a police report, Juan Quintero managed to move his handcuffed hands in front of him, pulled out a concealed 9mm caliber handgun from his waistband through thick layers of clothing and shot Officer Rodney Johnson four times in the back of his head. Despite being fatally shot, Johnson was able to push an emergency button in his patrol car, which alerted officers of the situation. After Quintero shot Johnson, he then fired some shots which missed a tow truck driver who was near the scene. When officers arrived, they found Quintero, still in the backseat of the patrol car handcuffed with the gun. Quintero was placed in custody shortly afterwards.

== Burial and posthumous honors ==
Johnson was buried on September 27, 2006. More than 4,000 people attended his funeral, including city officials, and law enforcement officers from around the county. Donations of more than $87,000 were donated to the 100 Club, an organization for family members of fallen firefighters and police officers.

Texas Governor Rick Perry awarded Johnson with the Star of Texas Award, given to fallen and injured first responders. The Texas Senate also honored Johnson in a Senate resolution.

=== Widow's lawsuits ===
Johnson's wife Joslyn Johnson filed four lawsuits since her husband's death. In 2008, she sued the Houston Police Department for wrongful death for not allowing a two-man patrol car. Most of this suit was dismissed. Johnson separately filled another lawsuit, a federal civil rights action challenging the City of Houston's policy preventing officers from informing federal officials of immigration status of detained persons; she argued that the policy was an unconstitutional violation of free speech. In 2010, this suit was dismissed in federal district court on the ground that the claims were too similar to that of Johnson's earlier wrongful-death suit. In 2011, however, the U.S. Court of Appeals for the Fifth Circuit reversed the decision, finding that "the cases challenged different HPD policies - the one in force at the time of Rodney Johnson's death and a later revision."

== Perpetrator ==
Juan Leonardo Quintero, 35, is an illegal alien with mental deficiencies caused by a childhood fall. Quintero first entered the U.S. in 1994, illegally crossing the border at Matamoros and ending up in Houston. He was arrested in 1995 for drunk driving and failure to stop and give information about an accident; he was also arrested in 1996 for driving with a suspended license. In 1998, he pleaded guilty to indecency with a 12-year-old girl and pleaded guilty in exchange for deferred adjudication. In April 1999, he was detained by immigration agents at a probation meeting, and deported to Mexico the next month. In late 1999, however, the owner of a landscaping business that he had employed Quintero in Houston lent him money to hire a coyote to smuggle him across the border.

After shooting Johnson, Quintero was quickly apprehended and confessed to police. He pleaded not guilty by reason of insanity to the charge of capital murder; the jury rejected this defense and convicted him. Quintero was sentenced to life in prison without parole in 2008. He was one of five prisoners who allegedly made an unsuccessful attempt to escape the maximum-security Allan B. Polunsky Unit, a prison in Livingston, Texas, in 2010.

=== Conviction of perpetrator's employer ===
In 2009, Robert Lane Camp, the owner of a landscaping firm that employed Quintero and leased a residence to him, pleaded guilty in the U.S. District Court for the Southern District of Texas to knowingly harboring an illegal alien. In 2010, Camp was sentenced to three months in prison, three months of home confinement, and five years of probation under special conditions. U.S. Attorney Don DeGabrielle in Houston said the prosecution of Camp serves to "demonstrate the consequences a U.S. citizen faces" by harboring, employing or helping an illegal immigrant enter the country.
