= Capo (musical device) =

Common tool for players of guitars and other stringed instruments

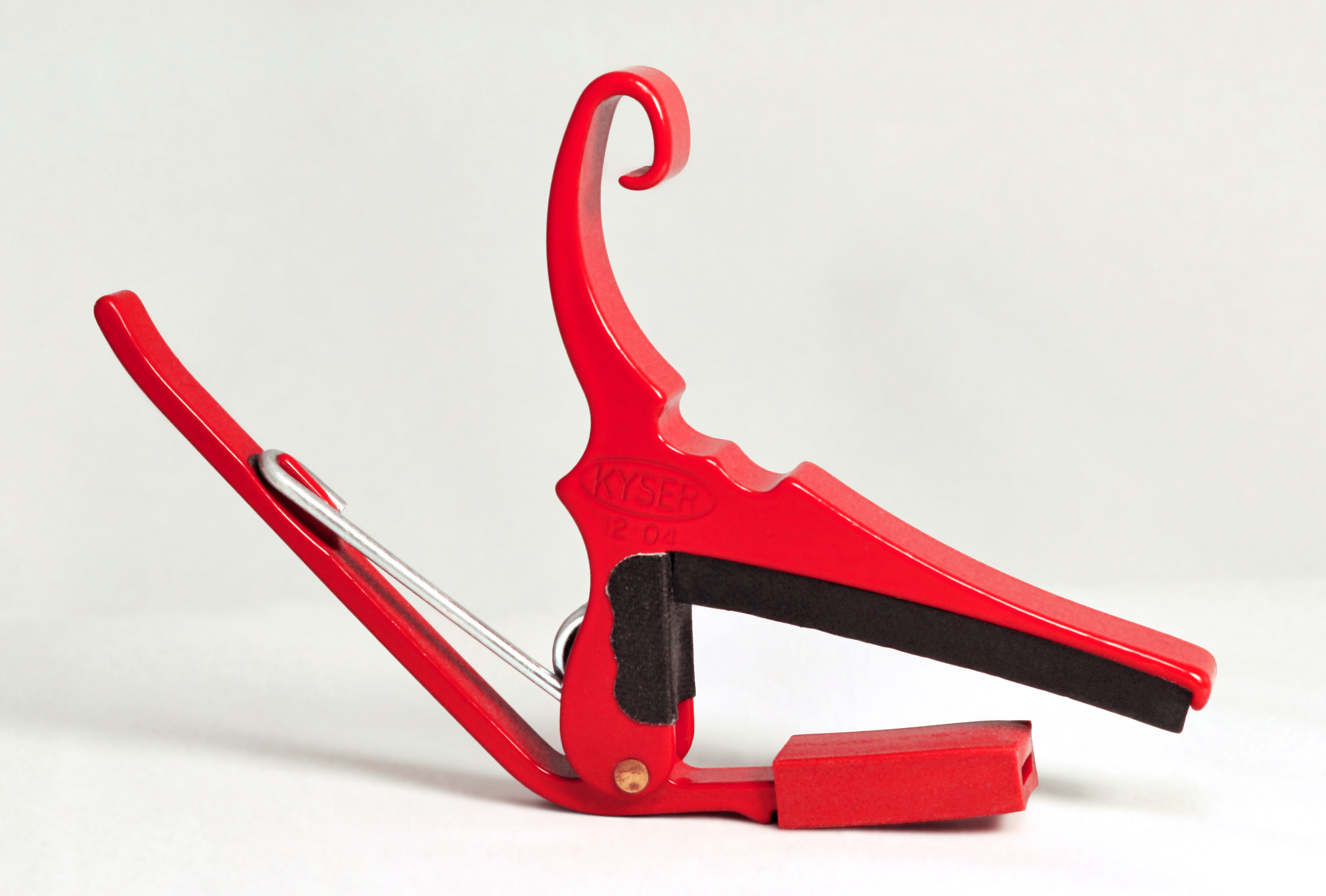
Spring clamp capo

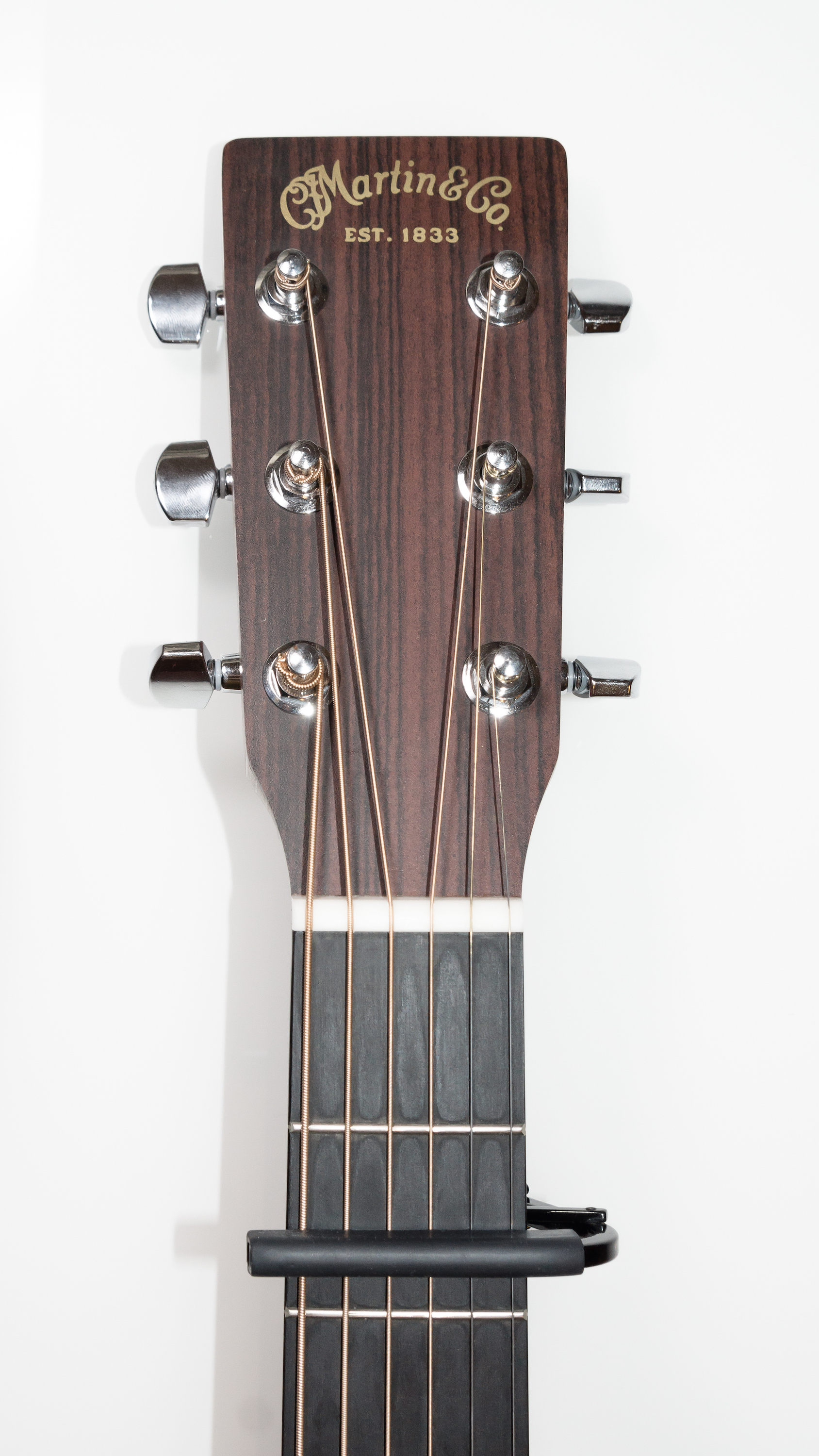
capo

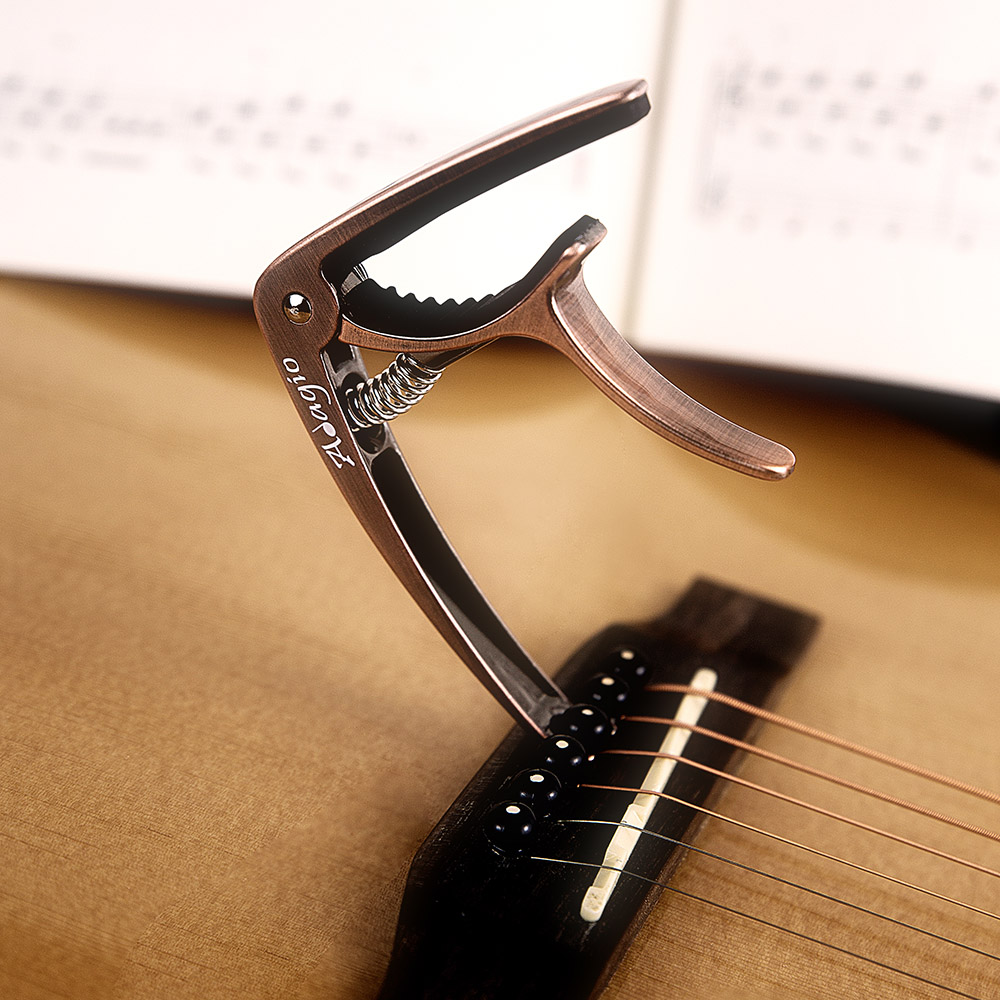
Demonstrating the peg removal feature on an Adagio guitar capo

A capo (/ˈkɑːpoʊ/ KAH-poh; short for capodastro, capo tasto, copypasto or capotasto [ˌkapoˈtasto], Italian for "head of fretboard") (Note: Spanish: cejilla [θeˈxiʎa], capo [ˈkapo] or capodastro; French: capodastre; German: Kapodaster; Portuguese: capotraste; Serbo-Croatian: kapodaster; Greek: καποτάστο, romanized: kapotásto.) is a device a musician uses on the neck of a stringed (typically fretted) instrument to transpose and shorten the playable length of the strings—hence raising the pitch. It is a common tool for players of guitars, mandolins, mandolas, banjos, ukuleles and bouzoukis. The word derives from the Italian capotasto, which means the nut of a stringed instrument. The earliest known use of capotasto is by Giovanni Battista Doni who, in his Annotazioni of 1640, uses it to describe the nut of a viola da gamba. The first patented capo was designed by James Ceòlmhor Ashborn of Wolcottville, Connecticut, year 1850.

Musicians commonly use a capo to raise the pitch of a fretted instrument so they can play in a different key using the same fingerings as playing open (i.e., without a capo). In effect, a capo uses a fret of an instrument to create a new nut at a higher note than the instrument's actual nut.

There are various capo designs, but most commercial capos consist of a rubber-covered bar that clamps to the instrument's neck in some way to hold down the strings. Capos come in different sizes and shapes for different instruments and fretboard curvatures. Factors that vary by type of capo are ease of use, size, degree of interference with the player's hands, and ability to hold down strings uniformly without affecting tuning. All types of capo should be applied after a fresh tuning by laying the barre, descending from above, and directly behind the fret, so that all of the strings have uniform position and pressure. If the strings are bent or mispositioned, the instrument sounds out of tune in the new key. Some types of capo can mar the neck of the guitar if applied incorrectly.

== Use ==
Song arrangements may cite capo position just as they cite alternative tunings. When referencing fingerings for a song that uses a capo, the player determines whether the chart references absolute finger positions, or positions relative to the capo. In tablature, for example, a note played on the fifth fret of an instrument capoed at the second fret can be listed as "5" (absolute) or "3" (relative to capo). Similarly, a D-shaped chord can be referred to as "D" (based on the shape relative to the capo), or E (based on the absolute audible chord produced). Neither method strongly prevails over the other. For this reason, the phrase "chord-shape" is commonly used to clarify that the fingering shape and not the audible pitch is being referred to.

With this concept in mind, if two players want to play a chord progression in a more interesting way, one can play first position chord-shapes with no capo, while the second player places the capo further up the fretboard and plays different voicings of the same chords. This creates a fuller sound than two guitars playing in unison. For example, if they play a simple I IV V chord progression together in E the first guitarist plays E A B7 while the second plays the same progression capoed at the fourth fret using C F G7 chord-shapes.

Playing with a capo creates the same musical effect as retuning all strings up the same number of steps. However, using a capo only affects the open note of each string. Every other fret remains unaffected (e.g., the seventh fret of an E-string still plays a B note for any capo position at or below the seventh fret), and thus a performer does not need to adjust for or relearn the entire fretboard as they might with retuning. The scale length of the strings of an instrument affects the timbre of the strings, and thus the use of a capo may alter the tone of the instrument.

Musicians also use capos to bring a guitar tuned below standard up to standard tuning. Manufacturers sometimes recommend tuning a twelve-string guitar a whole-step or more below standard to offset the additional stress of the additional strings. A capo can raise it to standard tuning. However, through improved manufacturing techniques, many modern 12-strings are tuned to standard pitch.

=== In different music styles ===
Some guitar styles—such as flamenco, Irish traditional music, and British and American folk music—frequently use a capo. Others—such as classical and jazz—rarely use a capo. Many rock and roll musicians who are influenced by folk and blues—such as Richard Thompson, Keith Richards, Ry Cooder, Ian Anderson, Steve Earle, George Harrison, Tom Petty, Bob Dylan, Noel Gallagher, Steve Rothery, Johnny Marr, and others—also use the capo. In many cases, they have extended its use past the traditional purpose of changing the key, and broken new ground, employing it in new ways.

== Mechanisms and styles ==
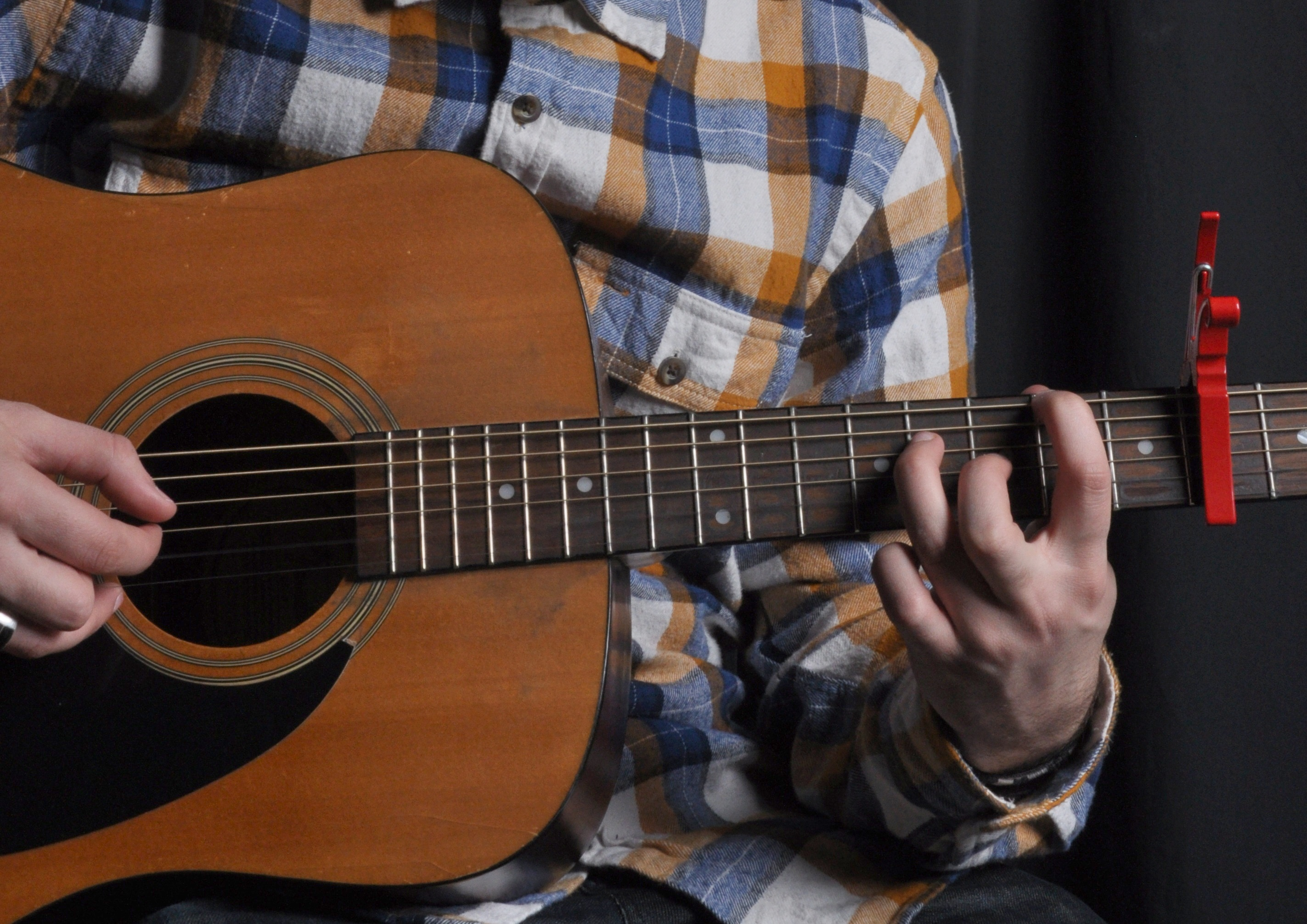
A guitar being played with a spring clamp capo

A strap-on capo's rubber-covered bar is held to the strings by a strap attached to either end of the bar. A strap-on capo commonly features either an elastic strap, or an adjustable fabric strap.

Modern variations on the strap-on capo include a semi-flexible plastic "strap" connected to the bar on one side and adjustable on the other side by a ratchet system. Strap-on capos differ from other capos in that most other capos contain only rigid parts, and most other styles do not wrap entirely around the neck of the instrument. This full wrap provides fairly even pressure of the capo bar across all strings. The strap-on capo is commonly a low-cost capo option, and is one of the earlier designs. Because they stretch to create a tight fit, the straps on these capos can be prone to stretch-fatigue and wear.

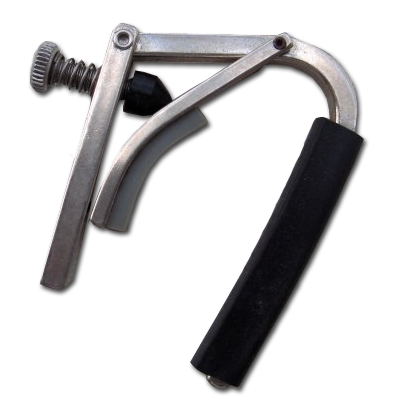
A Shubb capo, which uses a lever-operated over-centre locking action clamp

One common modern capo style is the spring-clamp capo (sometimes called "trigger-style" after the Dunlop trademarked Trigger capo). The most common of this type of capo has two bars: a rubber-covered bar to barre the strings, and another that presses against the back of the instrument neck to hold the first bar to the strings. The second bar is commonly curved to match the contour of the back of the neck. The two bars attach on a pivot at one end, and a spring presses them together.

Each bar has a 'grip' attached at a right angle to the bar; the two grips, when squeezed together by the user, pull the two bars apart, allowing the user to quickly release the capo's grip, apply or adjust the capo, then release the grips, allowing the spring to pull the bars together again. The look of the grips, and the action of squeezing them is akin to a gun's trigger, leading to the name of this capo. These are the most common design referred to as "quick-release" capos.

Though other styles also use that term, the spring clamp capo, because it can be operated by one hand in one single squeezing motion, is typically the quickest capo to apply or move on the instrument; other capos can be quicker and easier to remove from the instrument. One disadvantage to the spring clamp capo is that the pressure of the spring is not adjustable. The spring applies its maximum pressure to hold the strings down, which could have an effect on the tuning of some guitars if not applied properly. These capos can typically be applied either to the treble or bass side of the instrument, depending on the player's preference. Three of the most recognizable models of spring clamp capos are manufactured by Dunlop, Kyser and Thalia.

Manufacturers have tried to create the ideal capo. One of the more recognized capos is the Shubb capo. A musician applies the Shubb capo by holding it in place and closing a lever. The unique aspect of this capo is that the lever presses against a second arm that presses against the back of the instrument neck. The amount of pressure the lever exerts is adjustable by a screw, so that the capo can exert the minimal amount of pressure required to fret the strings.

Proponents claim this has the least impact on tuning. The Shubb capo has the disadvantage of requiring two hands to properly apply or move, and its adjustment is more complicated than some other capos. However, because of the lever design, the capo can be removed very quickly by simply releasing the lever. This is particularly true if the capo is applied from the treble side of the instrument, which facilitates quick removal.

=== Variations ===
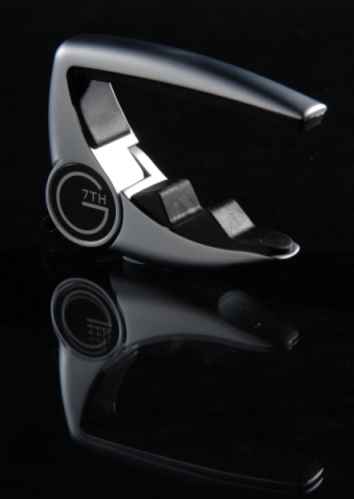
A G7th Capo Company capo, which uses a wrap spring clutch

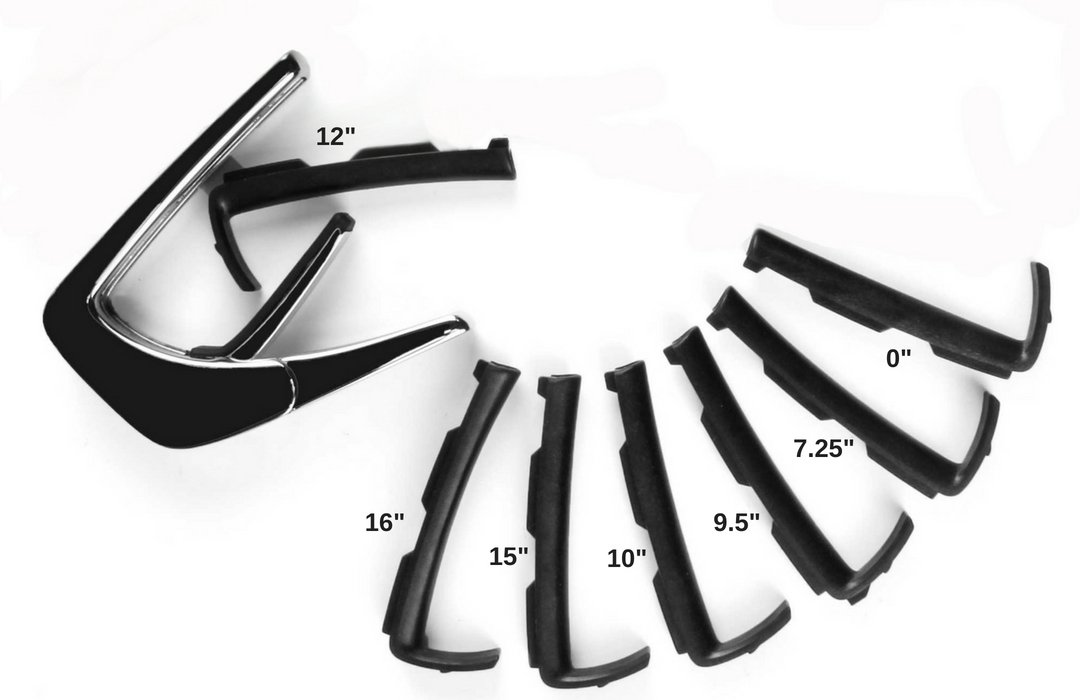
Capo with interchangeable fretpads

Numerous other capos types are variations on the designs above:

- A screw-on capo has some form of surface that presses against the back of the neck of the instrument to hold the bar in place against the strings. This back surface is held to the neck by a screw tightened to apply direct pressure. One form of this capo is effectively a rubber-covered bar built into a C-clamp.
- A rolling capo facilitates quick key changes in the middle of tunes or sets. A roller holds down the strings and another roller behind the neck holds it in place, so the player can roll the capo along the neck. People who prefer it feel it improves on fixed capos, as they can move it with the fretting hand without interrupting a performance. There are two such rolling capos. the Bennett Glider, from a 1974 US Patent, is still made in the U.S., and in an inexpensive "knock-off" version by a Chinese company. The more advanced Sixth Finger capo, patented in 2013, is presently hand-made in Spain, and is difficult to find due to limited production.
- Fifth-string capo: The five-string banjo, with its short fifth string, poses a particular problem for using the capo. For many years now Shubb has had available a fifth-string capo, consisting of a narrow metal strip fixed to the side of the neck of the instrument, with a sliding stopper for the string. Other options are to use model railroad spikes to hold the string down at higher frets or simply to retune the string to fit with the pitch of the other strings with the capo applied.

=== Decorative variations ===
For centuries capos have been utilitarian devices, but in recent years capo manufacturers have started to focus on enhancing capo aesthetics. The G7th Capo Company released the Performance 2 Celtic Special Edition design, Kyser's Capos come in many different colors and patterns, and Thalia Capos took it a step further and now offers hundreds of exotic wood and shell inlays on their capos, designed to match the various tonewoods and inlays found on fine guitars.

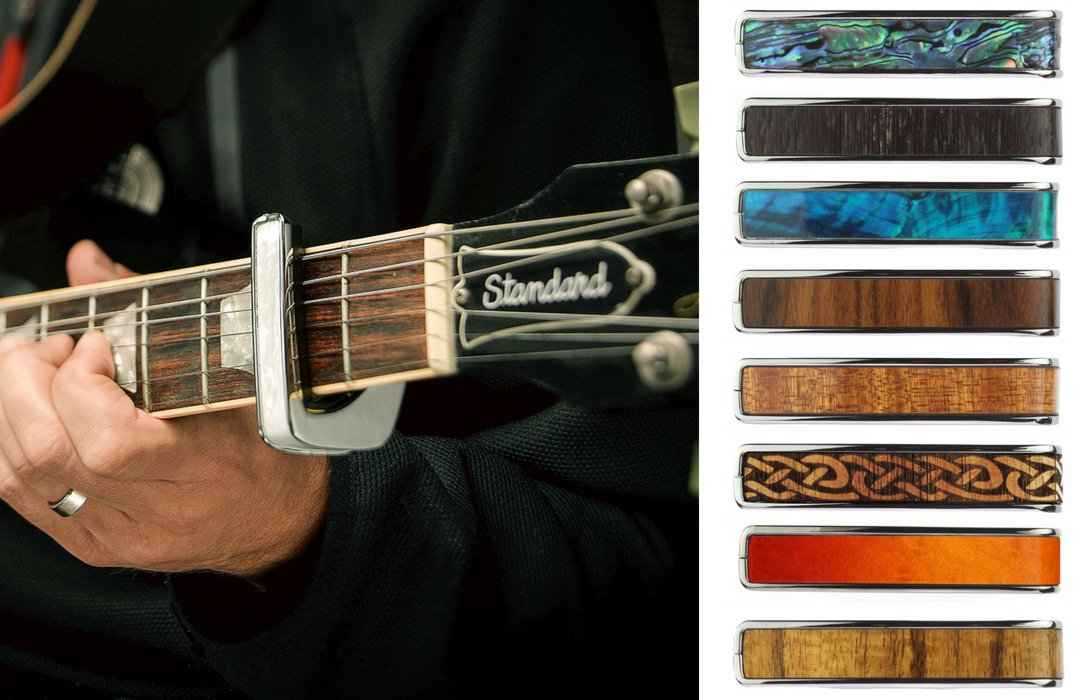
Capo with exotic wood and shell inlays

=== Partial capo ===
Though most capos are designed to raise all strings, partial capos specifically capo only some of the strings. This may appear to have a similar effect to alternate tunings, but there are differences. A common example is a capo that covers the top five strings of a guitar and omitting the bass E string. When played at the second fret, this appears to create a drop D tuning (in which the bass E string is detuned to a D) raised one full tone in pitch. In fact, these are often marketed as "drop D capos". However, the same difference applies with a drop D capo as with a regular capo; namely, only the open tuning of the strings is affected, and thus, when used at the second fret, an E chord using the D shape has the "Drop D sound" with a low E note. However, a G-shape chord can be played as well, as the fretted E string is not as affected as it would be if the string was retuned.

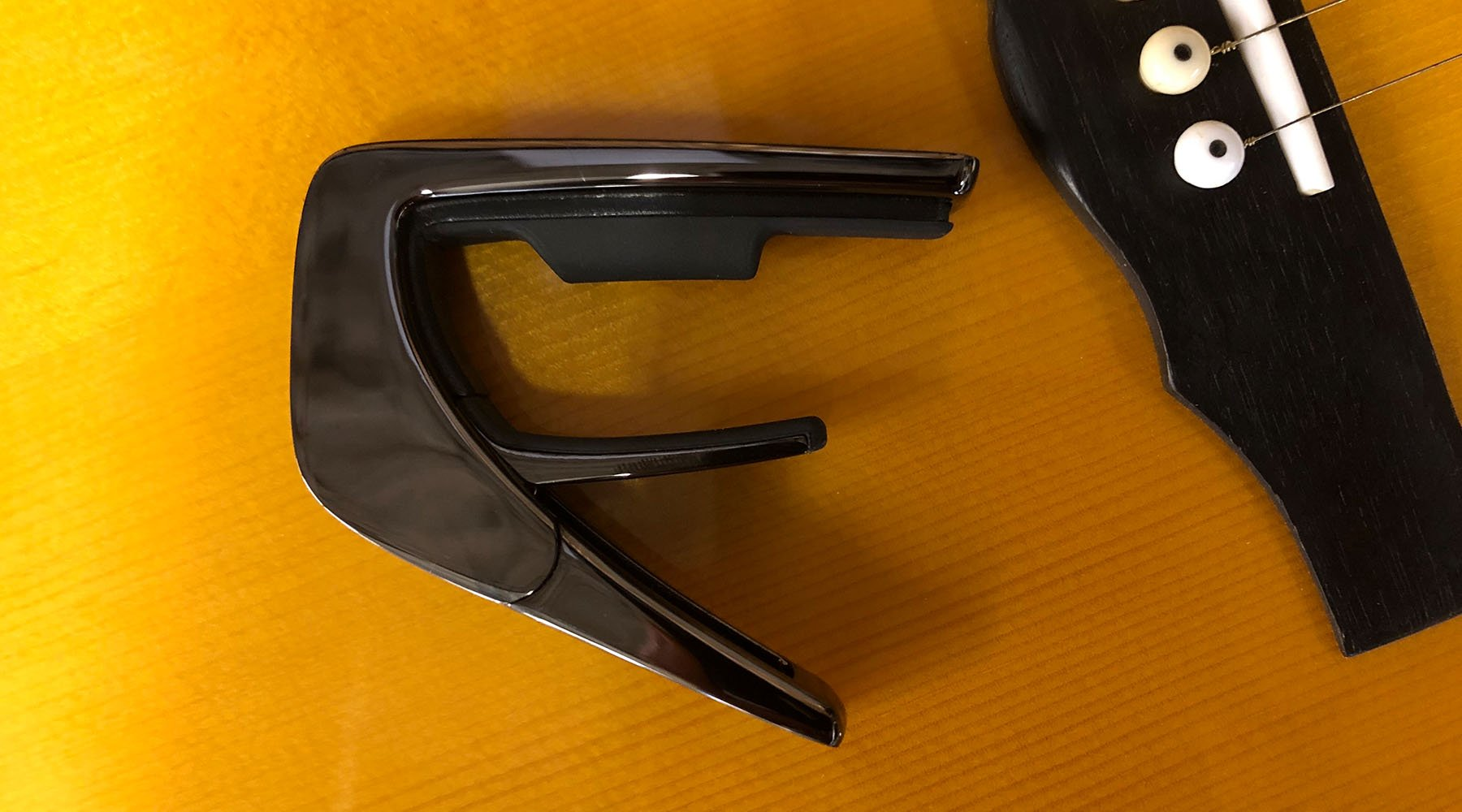
Capo with partial fretpad installed

Partial capos are a relatively recent design. Until their creation, some innovative players used their standard capos (or altered capos) to cover only some of the strings of their instruments. The above-mentioned drop D design was previously achieved, for example, by applying a spring clamp capo to the treble side of the fretboard but leaving the bass E string uncovered. Similarly, users of the Shubb capo altered their capos by cutting off some of the rubber-covered bar's length or by altering the rubber covering to leave certain strings unaffected. The Thalia Capo's interchangeable fretpads can provide a partial fretpad set as an accessory that converts a standard Thalia capo into a partial capo. This design has two different configurations, depending on how the musician places the capo on the fretboard. Installing from the bass side of the neck capos strings 3-4-5. Installing from the treble side capos strings 2-3-4.

Other common partial capo designs press the second fret of the third, fourth and fifth strings (producing the effect of DADGAD tuning raised two semitones), or on the second fret of the second, third and fourth strings (open A major). Again, this creates no change of fingering above the capo.

American guitarist Dominic Frasca uses single string "mini capos" that attach by drilling through the neck of his customized 10-string guitar. These are similar to the single-string "capos" many Eastern instruments use, in which the player hooks a string under the head of a "nail" to capo it. This is a common capo practice during the performance of a musical piece, so that the tuning at the end of the piece sounds different from the one at the beginning.

This is a common method to capo the fifth string of a five-string banjo. The fifth string begins at the corresponding fret and players often need to capo it individually.
