= Fifth Chinese Daughter =

1950 memoir by Jade Snow Wong

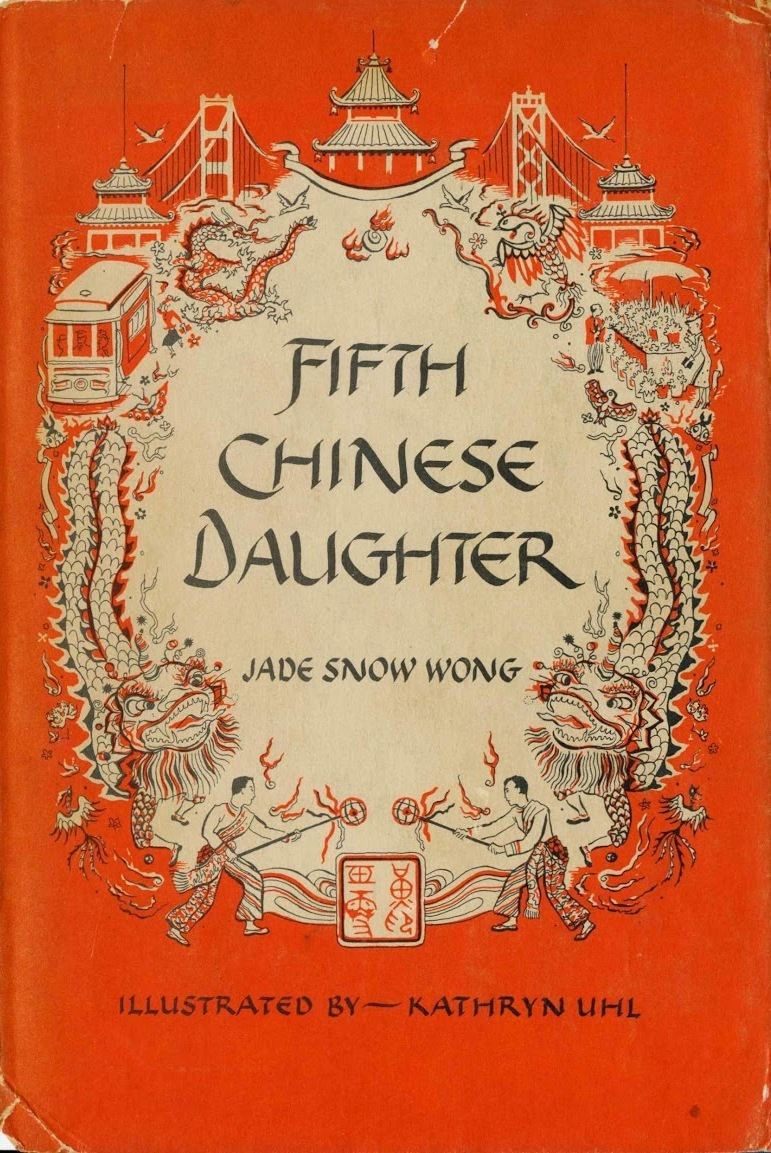
- 1950 cover
- Author: Jade Snow Wong
- Language: English
- Subject: Memoir
- Publication date: 1950
- Publication place: United States
- Media type: Print (hardcover)
- Pages: 264
- ISBN: 9780295968261 (hardcover)

Fifth Chinese Daughter is a 1950 memoir by Chinese American writer and ceramist Jade Snow Wong. The name of the book refers to Wong being the fifth child born to immigrant parents from China. The book has been considered as an early classic of Asian American literature.

== Synopsis ==
In Fifth Chinese Daughter, Wong describes her upbringing in Chinatown, San Francisco, providing a detailed portrayal of her family's immigrant experience and the disciplined upbringing she received. It also explores her defiance against the expectations imposed by both her family and society for a Chinese woman.

== Reception ==
Published in 1950, the book became a best-seller, especially in the aftermath of the lifting of the Chinese Exclusion Act in 1943.

In a profile about Wong, The New York Times wrote that the Fifth Chinese Daughter is "a portrait of the Chinese American immigrant family experience, written with humanity and insight." Journalist Neely Tucker writing for the Library of Congress blog about the book in 2021, wrote that "the book has settled into the national narrative as a lasting portrait of Chinese American life at the midcentury – stilted, sometimes perceptive, sometimes shading the truth in favor of an up-by-the-bootstraps narrative."

In a scathing review about the book in 1979, Patricia Lin Blinde wrote that the book "in no way adds anything in terms of real knowledge where the general public's picture of Chinese people is concerned" and "what Wong does is essentially to 'repeat' the white world's articulations and expectations as to what Chineseness is or not."

== Promotion ==
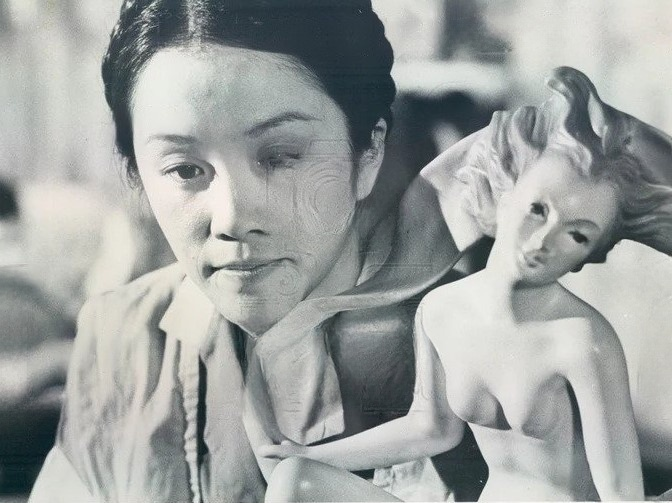
Freda Foh Shen as Jade Snow Wong in PBS's half-hour special Jade Snow (1976)

The success of the book led it to being translated into several Asian languages by the U.S. State Department and Wong being sent on a four-month speaking tour of Asia in 1953, to promote the book. In 2004, the Fifth Chinese Daughter was published in China by Yilin Press under the title Chinese Daughter A Wu (Chinese: 华女阿五; pinyin: Huá nǚ ā wǔ).

In 1976, PBS made a half-hour special for public television based on Fifth Chinese Daughter, called Jade Snow, in which Wong was portrayed by actress Freda Foh Shen and Wong's father portrayed by actor James Hong.
