= Rita Arauz =

Rita Aráuz was a lesbian feminist who was a part of the Sandinista National Liberation Front (FSLN). Her most prominent years were in the 1970s and 1980s, when she advocated for gay and lesbian rights in Nicaragua and raised awareness about the ongoing issue of AIDS. Her work included participation in the first gay and lesbian movements in Nicaragua, creating educational AIDS campaigns and collectives, organizing consciousness-raising groups about gay and lesbian topics, and increasing awareness about the gay and lesbian population in Nicaragua.

== Early life ==
Rita Aráuz was the oldest of five children. She came from a well-off family, as her father was the head of President Anastasio Somoza Debayle's Diplomatic Ceremonial Corps. Eventually, Aráuz and her family moved to San Francisco in the United States, where she completed high school. During this period, she also married, had a daughter, and began studying at San Francisco City College. Her marriage lasted only two years, but the separation from her husband helped her recognize her sexual orientation and develop a broader social consciousness regarding the oppression faced by marginalized groups.

After experiencing discrimination because she was a lesbian, Aráuz began to recognize the privilege of her upbringing. She realized that people are discriminated against for many reasons, including class, race, and sexuality. This realization led her to become involved in social movements in California, including Cesar Chavez farmworker movement, the Puerto Rican Socialist Party, and eventually the San Francisco branch of the FSLN around 1976–77.

She continued her work in San Francisco with organizations like GALA (Gay Latino Alliance), which was the first Latino gay rights group in the U.S. This group raised funds for gay communities, specifically gay people of color, in the U.S. Around this time, Aráuz graduated from college with a degree in psychology. Then, around 1984–85, Aráuz returned to Nicaragua for good.

== Historical context on Lesbian & Gay Rights in Nicaragua ==
The conflict between the Nicaraguan government and the Sandinistas was a long struggle that eventually led to the fall of the Somoza government. Even though the Sandinistas would eventually lose power again, there was a period filled with political reforms in Nicaragua after the government was overthrown. However, the concept of being gay or lesbian was not well received by many in Nicaragua. This is partially due to the fact that many people were not able to explore their sexual identity.

The concept of being gay in Nicaragua has a more machismo-based perspective and has to do with who a person has sex with rather than how they identify. Someone considered a "homosexual" is a man who takes on the "woman's role" in sex, while the other man is considered "hypermasculine" because he is the active partner.

Many people, including Aráuz, have described discrimination they faced for being gay or lesbian. They described how their families shunned and denied their sexuality. Also, there was not a lot of gay and lesbian representation due to the fact that there were no collectives. There have always been gay people around, but it was usually just individuals, not groups or a community. Although the FSLN focused on sexual politics, some Sandinistas have described that same-sex relationships were not well received by their comrades. If people were caught in same-sex relationships, they could have been kicked out of the movement.

== Serving as a Sandinista ==
As a lesbian feminist, Rita Aráuz advocated for gay and lesbian rights by forming social movements. These were formed around gay rights and recognizing its ideologies. These movements also focused on public health, especially with the AIDS crisis. Aráuz worked with the Sandinista Ministry of Health (MINSA), under the authority of Dora María Téllez, to create educational campaigns about AIDS prevention. This led to the development of CEP-SIDA, a program filled with educators working to fight against AIDS. In March 1990, Aráuz worked on another AIDS organization called Nimehuatzín, which did work on a macro level. This movement helped them develop AIDS research, as well as promote sex education and provide preventative education.

Aráuz also worked to develop conscious-raising workshops and therapy groups discussing topics such as coming out and how to deal with internalized homophobia. They hosted these workshops in many places, including schools and hospitals. Not only did she do work with the Sandinistas, making the gay and lesbian communities known in Nicaragua, but she also tried to spread to other groups like AMNLAE. However, they were not as receptive to the idea of lesbian women working with them.

== AIDS in Nicaragua ==
In comparison to the U.S., AIDS came a little late in Nicaragua. When AIDS hit Nicaragua, many people dismissed it. This was due many factors including economic, political, and cultural. Economic factors include a lack of attention healthcare. Healthcare was not the top priority for the FSLN, and the primary health services were not focused on AIDS.

The question of AIDS being under-diagnosed in Nicaragua was brought up. There were people suspected of having another disease when they may have had AIDS. This issue was brought up because AIDS was being less reported in Nicaragua compared to other neighboring countries.

A lack of knowledge about how AIDS is contracted is also to be accounted for. Studies show that many people in Nicaragua thought that AIDS was contracted through public restrooms, mosquitos, and sharing drinks. AIDS was also perceived as a disease only for foreigners. Another factor is that sex with other men was not considered as a homosexual act if one was the active partner, as mentioned earlier. This means that many times, AIDS was contracted in heterosexual relationships, especially when married men would engage in sexual relations with other people, meaning that viewing AIDS as a gay problem could also lead to danger. This was one of the reasons why Aráuz did work for AIDS education, because she wanted people to know that AIDS was not just a male issue. This also led to the emphasis of sex education and why women should be able to have safe sex with condoms. In a study based in Managua, of the men interviewed, 24% had used a condom before, and only 6% used condoms frequently (Low, et al., 1993).

== Legacy ==
The work of Rita Aráuz spanned even after the Sandinistas were overthrown in 1990. For over two decades, she worked on lesbian and gay rights, creating and contributing to many organizations that supported these communities. She was even mentioned as a long-time activist in a magazine from the early 2000s.
