= Lorene Zarou-Zouzounis =

Palestinian-American writer and poet

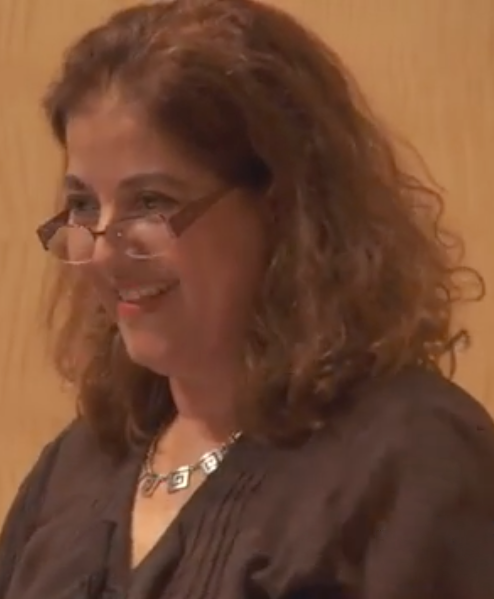
- Reading at the San Francisco Public Library in 2016
- Born: 1958 (age 67–68); Ramallah, Palestine
- Education: City College of San Francisco; San Francisco State University
- Occupation: Writer
- Website: www.lorenezarou-zouzounis.com

Lorene Zarou-Zouzounis (born 1958) is a Palestinian-American writer and poet. Zarou-Zouzounis writes in a variety of genres, including poetry, prose, short stories, science fiction, and children's historical fiction.

== Biography ==
Lorene Zarou-Zouzounis was born in Ramallah in 1958, and moved to Detroit with her family when she was five years old. She obtained her associate of arts degree from City College of San Francisco, and continued her studies at the renowned Creative Writing Department at San Francisco State University. She is described as being influenced by her heritage and has frequently written on subjects relating to the Middle East.

Zarou-Zouzounis had her first poem published in a CCSF anthology, followed by her big debut, of three poems published in a SFSU anthology in 1990. Her first publication was a self-published poetry chap book in 1987, titled Inquire Within.

Zarou-Zouzounis has performed hundreds of readings in the San Francisco Bay Area and in other parts of the U.S., beginning in the late 1980's at Small Press Traffic Book Store with her late friend and mentor, poet, novelist, artist, Etel Adnan.

Zarou-Zouzounis is widely published in print anthologies, and online with four poems plus an interview in LAdige Review. Poems are published in the following publications:

- Undertow Magazine, CCSF-1978,
- Out of the Maze-Ink Magazine #5; SFSU-1987,
- Self Published Chapbook - Inquire Within
- Writings by Arab-American & Arab-Canadian Feminists - South End Press - Food For Our Grandmothers edited by Joanna Kadi
- Simon & Schuster Books for Young Readers - Simon & Schuster Publishing - The Space Between Our Footsteps and The Flag of Childhood-Poems from the Middle East
- City Lights Review #5 - City Lights S.F. - War After War
- An Anthology of Radius of Arab American Writers, Inc. (RAWI)- A Different Path, edited by D. H. Melhem & Leila Diab
- Interlink Publishing Group - The Poetry of Arab Women: A Contemporary Anthology, edited by Nathalie Handal
- Revolutionary Poets Brigade Anthologies - Kallatumba Press - Heartfire-Second Revolutionary Poets Brigade Anthology, Overthrowing Capitalism--Reclaiming Community-Vol 3, Overthrowing Capitalism Vol 5, For All
- McCaa Books - Before I Forget, Stories of Bill Graham compiled by Rita Gentry
- A Journal of Contemporary DaDa Writing & Art - Three Rooms Press Publications - Maintenant 13, 14, 15, 17, 18.

Zarou-Zouzounis has been published in The Poetry of Arab Women: A Contemporary Anthology and in Heartfire-Second Revolutionary Poets Brigade Anthology.

Zarou-Zouzounis co-designed and taught poetry workshops in a public school for several years as part of a national Parent-Teacher Association (PTA) arts enrichment program. Zarou-Zouzounis was a producer and talk show hostess for an Arab themed local television show in San Jose, California.

== Prizes and awards ==
Placed finalist for two poems entered in the 2011 Indie Writing Contest-- (Author Solutions, Inc., the San Francisco Writers Conference, and San Francisco University Partner for this contest.)

Contributing author with 2 poems- Winner of the PEN Oakland Literary Award. The Poetry of Arab Women: A Contemporary Anthology; editor Nathalie Handal, Interlink.

Contributing author - Winner of the 2010 ALA Best Books for Young Adults award. The Space Between our Footsteps, selected by Naomi Shihab Nye, Simon & Schuster.
