= Win Ng =

American sculptor

- Born: April 13, 1936; Chinatown, San Francisco, US
- Died: September 6, 1991 (aged 55); San Francisco, US
- Other name: Winfred Ng
- Education: San Francisco State University; City College of San Francisco, Mills College
- Alma mater: BFA San Francisco Art Institute
- Occupations: Ceramicist, industrial designer, illustrator, sculptor, metal worker, painter
- Known for: Co-founder of Taylor & Ng

Win "Winfred" Ng (April 13, 1936 – September 6, 1991) was a Chinese American artist, entrepreneur, and decorative designer. Ng was known for working as a ceramist, sculptor, metal worker, industrial designer, painter and illustrator, but best known as the co-founder of the groundbreaking San Francisco based department store Taylor & Ng and his commercial ceramics work under the same name.

His artwork is in the collections of the Smithsonian, the National Museum of Modern Art, Tokyo, Victoria & Albert Museum, Museum of Contemporary Crafts, San Francisco Museum of Modern Art, Museum of Art and Design (MAD) and the De Young Museum.

== Early life ==
Ng was born in Chinatown, San Francisco to Chinese immigrants, Fook On Ng and Kow Yuan Ng. He had seven other siblings. As a teenager, he worked under ceramic artist and author, Jade Snow Wong. When he was 16, he rented a storefront in Hyde Street, San Francisco. When he was 18, he was drafted into the army and lived in France for two years, and he drew on helmets for his fellow soldiers.

He studied at Saint Mary's Academy, City College of San Francisco, and San Francisco State University. After serving in the United States Army he studied at the San Francisco Art Institute receiving a Bachelor of Fine Arts degree in 1959. He began the Masters of Fine Arts program at Mills College in 1960 but did not complete the program.

His early career as a ceramicist focused on abstract work influenced by Peter Voulkos and resulted in a one-man show in 1958 at the Michow Gallery in New York City. From 1958 to 1965, Ng worked as a gallery artist, producing abstract ceramics sculptures. By the 1970s Ng had seven one-man shows to his credit in Paris, New York, Portland, Oregon, and San Francisco.

== Taylor & Ng ==
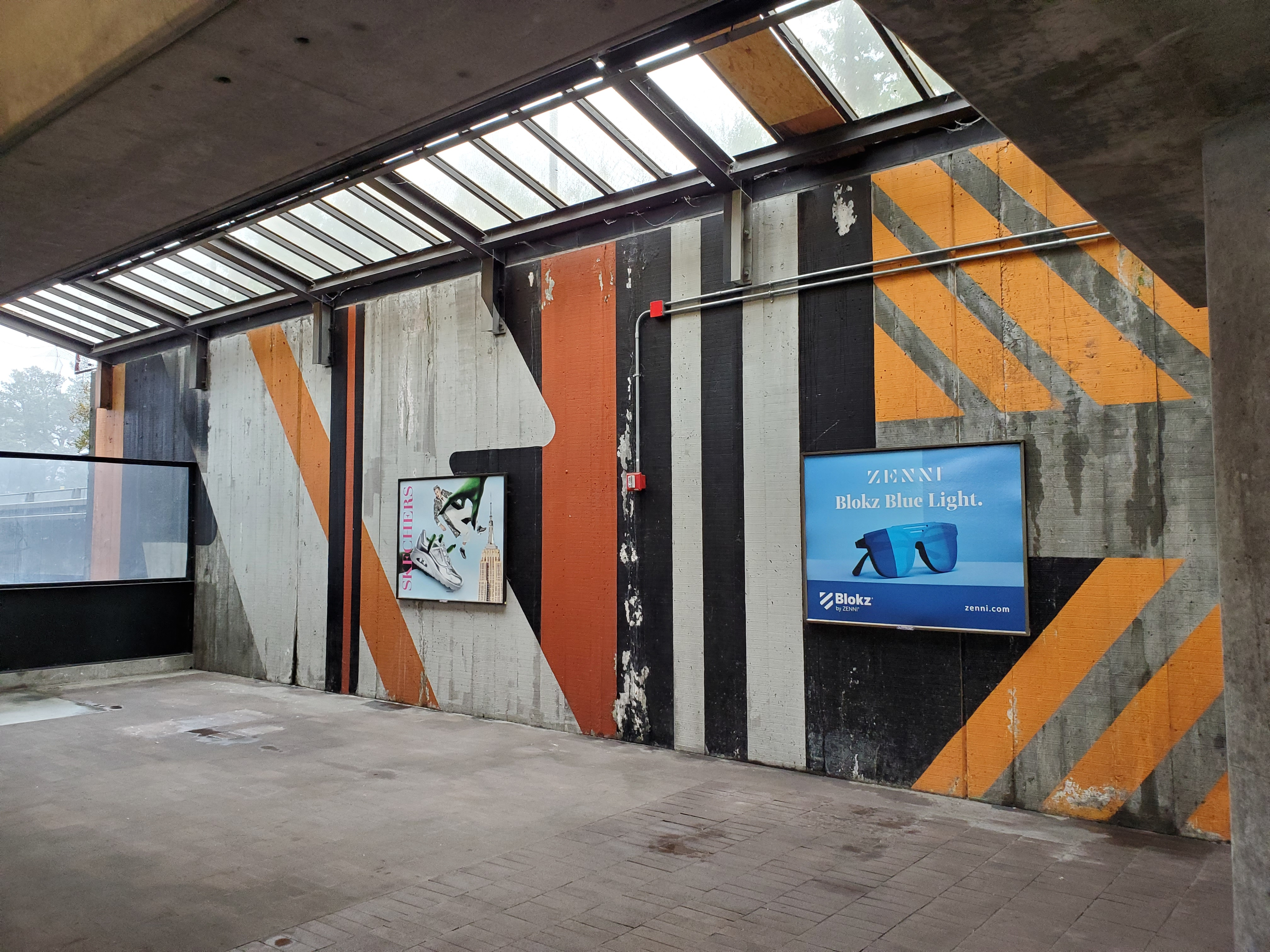
Part of Ng's 1970s mural at BART Orinda station, photo taken in 2020.

Ng met artist Spaulding Taylor and shifted his focus toward utilitarian and functional illustration and design work. In 1965 the two founded Environmental Ceramics (the precursor to Taylor & Ng) and moved into creating handmade art-ware and homewares.

Taylor & Ng was founded during 1965 with the addition of Win Ng's brother, Norman Ng, as president. Their first storefront opened on Howard Street, San Francisco in 1967. into a major producer and retailer of housewares and owning a multi-level emporium shop at Embarcadero Center. There were also stores at other Bay Area locations as well a Taylor & Ng shop inside Macy’s in New York. These products sold heavily through Macy's and other major department stores and housewares retailers throughout the US during the late 1970s and 1980s.

Ng's whimsical designs and animal drawings became a thematic focal point for many Taylor & Ng products. In 1979, a set of mugs originally titled "The Wild Wild Kingdom", later changed to "Animates", and sometimes referred to as "the animal orgy mugs", were released. The set depicted animals having an orgy, which could be initially be mistaken as them wrestling, hugging, and dancing. Taylor & Ng later released another series of mugs called "Tall Mugs", which featured nude men with animals and other designs. In 1972, during Presedent Richard Nixon's visit to China, Taylor & Ng released a wok with a steamer basket, tongs, and a spatula. Their collection of cooking supplies consisting of works, cleavers, tea pots, calligraphy set, and tempura kit, titled the "Far East Housewares Collection", made 50% of the company's total revenue.

Through their own San Francisco department store and wholesale business, Taylor & Ng not only created a signature style still in demand by collectors, but helped to popularize Asian culture and cuisine. The Taylor & Ng company is credited with bringing the Chinese wok to the US and making it a common kitchen utensil. In the late 1970s, they expanded their line to include a wide range of kitchen products, including a clever wood-and-metal-hook pot rack called the "Track Rack" that is still sold today. The Taylor & Ng department store closed in 1985 so that the business could focus on its wholesale activities.

== Late life ==
Ng was openly gay. His life partner was Spaulding Taylor, artist and co-founder of Taylor & Ng.

In 1981, Ng left the retail design world to focus on his gallery work.

Ng died on September 6, 1991, from AIDS-related complications. He was 55. Ng's was represented posthumously by the Braunstein/Quay Gallery in San Francisco until the gallery closed in 2011.

== Legacy ==
Ng's 1968 colorful, ceramic tile mural illustrating science is located at the Maxine Hall Health Center in the Western Addition neighborhood of San Francisco. This mural was produced by the San Francisco Art Commission. A 1970s mural, 100 by 16 foot by Ng graces the concourse level of the Orinda BART station in Contra Costa County, California.

In April 2005, the Chinese Historical Society of America in collaboration with the Queer Cultural Center held a retrospective of Ng's work under the title of "The Art of Win Ng" as part of the National Queer Arts Festival 2005.

== Bibliography ==
Ng created illustrations for a number of books by Yerba Buena Press throughout the 1970s. These included collaborations with authors Violet and Charles Schafer. Ng also illustrated publications by Taylor & Ng.

- Schafer, Violet (1971). Herbcraft, A Compendium of Myths, Romance. Win Ng (Illustrator). San Francisco, California: Yerba Buena Press, Random House Trade Paperbacks. ISBN 9780912738000.
- Schafer, Violet; Schafer, Charles (1972). Wokcraft, a Stirring Compendium of Chinese Cookery. Win Ng (Illustrator) (1 ed.). Random House Trade & Taylor & Ng. ISBN 0912738014.
- Schafer, Violet (1973). Eggcraft: A Compendium of Folklore, Fancies & Foods. Win Ng (Illustrator). San Francisco, California: Taylor & Ng, Yerba Buena Press. ISBN 0394709837.
- Cox, Janet (1973). PlantCraft: A Growing Compendium of Sound Indoor Gardening with Sound. Win Ng (Illustrator), Spaulding Taylor (Photographer), Kenneth Ziegenfuss (Contributor). San Francisco, California: Taylor & Ng, Yerba Buena Press. ISBN 0912738022.
- Schafer, Violet; Schafer, Charles Louis (1975). Teacraft, A Treasure of Romance, Rituals, and Recipes. Win Ng (Illustrator). San Francisco, CA: Yerba Buena Press, Random House. ISBN 0-91273806-5.
- Gin, Margaret (1975). Ricecraft: A Gathering of Rice Cookery, Culture and Customs. Win Ng (Illustrator). Taylor & Ng. ISBN 9780394730509.
- Schafer, Violet; Schafer, Charles (1976). Coffee, A Connoisseur View of Coffee, It's Lore, Varieties, Brewing Methods, Equipment, and Companion Foods. Win Ng (Illustrator). San Francisco: Taylor & Ng. ISBN 978-0912738086.
- Yee, Rhoda (1977). Dim Sum: The Delicious Secrets of Home-Cooked Chinese Tea Lunch. Win Ng (Illustrator) (1 ed.). Taylor & Ng. ISBN 9780912738109.
