= City College of San Francisco =

Community college in California, US

- Former name: San Francisco Junior College (1935–1948)
- Motto: The Truth Shall Make You Free
- Type: Community college
- Established: August 26, 1935
- Academic affiliations: CCCS; CCCAA
- Budget: $313.8 million (2023–24)
- Faculty: 1,836
- Students: 23,410 (2023)
- Location: San Francisco, U.S. 37.725716°N 122.450178°W
- Campus: Urban
- Newspaper: The Guardsman
- Colors: Red & black
- Nickname: Rams
- Website: ccsf.edu

City College of San Francisco (CCSF or City College) is a public community college in San Francisco, California, United States. Founded as a junior college in 1935, the college plays an important local role, enrolling as many as 1 in 35 San Francisco residents annually. CCSF is accredited by the Accrediting Commission for Community and Junior Colleges (ACCJC).

CCSF, the only community college in San Francisco, offers tuition-free education for all residents of the city. The Ocean Avenue campus, bordering the Sunnyside, Westwood Park and Ingleside neighborhoods, is the college's largest location. The college has five other locations around the city.

CCSF offers Associate degree programs and certificate programs. City College of San Francisco has articulation agreements with the California State University system, the University of California system, and other private and public universities in California and across the United States. Free non-credit courses in subjects such as ESL and citizenship as well as adult education classes are also provided.

== History ==
=== San Francisco Junior College ===
The founding of a junior college in San Francisco had long been the dream of Archibald Jeter Cloud, the Chief Deputy Superintendent of the San Francisco Unified School District (SFUSD). In response to Black Tuesday and the ensuing Great Depression, Cloud worked to convince the San Francisco Board of Education of the necessity of a junior college in Depression-era San Francisco and of the District's financial ability to form one. Cloud's presentation of fiscal studies in 1934 convinced the Board of the availability of Federal and State funding for a junior college. City College of San Francisco was established by the Board of Education of the San Francisco Unified School District on February 15, 1934, and officially opened on August 26, 1935, as San Francisco Junior College (SFJC). The college had no central campus at the time. Instruction began on September 4, 1935, with morning classes held at the University of California Extension building on Powell Street and afternoon classes held at Galileo High School. The long distance between the two locations gave the college the nickname "Trolley Car College." Increasing enrollment gave way to the college's expansion to Lick-Wilmerding High School, Samuel Gompers Trade School, Marina Junior High School, and other locations. A permanent main campus near Ocean Avenue was approved by the San Francisco Board of Education in 1937 and opened in 1940 with the opening of Science Hall.

=== City College of San Francisco ===
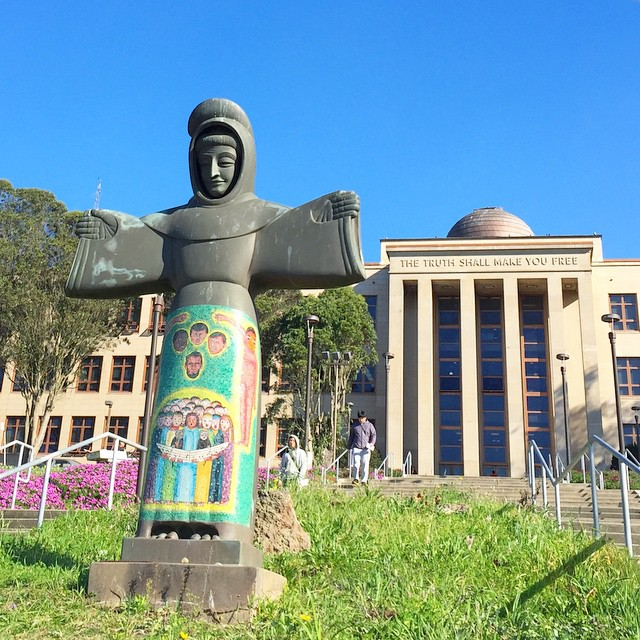
Ocean Avenue Campus with Beniamino Bufano's Saint Francis of the Guns of 1968 sculpture in the foreground

In February 1948, the name was changed to City College of San Francisco. It now consists of six campuses, the Ocean Campus being the primary one.

In 1970, the college separated from the San Francisco Unified School District. The college continued to hold noncredit education programs throughout San Francisco's neighborhoods. However, as a result of CCSF's rapid growth, the San Francisco Community College District divided the programs between a division for credit courses at the Ocean Campus and one other division for noncredit courses throughout locations in San Francisco. The two educational divisions merged as a single division in 1990 with program locations held at campuses of City College of San Francisco.

==== Accreditation crisis ====
In 2012, the college began experiencing significant public turmoil. On July 2, 2012, the Accrediting Commission for Community and Junior Colleges (ACCJC), gave the college eight months to prove it should remain accredited and ordered it to "make preparations for closure". As summarized by the San Francisco Chronicle in 2015, "the commission has never found wrongdoing or substandard instruction, but has said the college should lose accreditation because of tangled governance structures, poor fiscal controls and insufficient self-evaluation and reporting." In September 2012, the state chancellor's office warned that a special trustee would be appointed to oversee the institution's finances if the college did not voluntarily invite one; the board of trustees voted to invite a special trustee, despite student protests and objection. A report issued by California's Fiscal Crisis & Management Assistance team in September 2012 found the institution to be in a "perilous financial position" caused largely by "poor decisions and a lack of accountability.

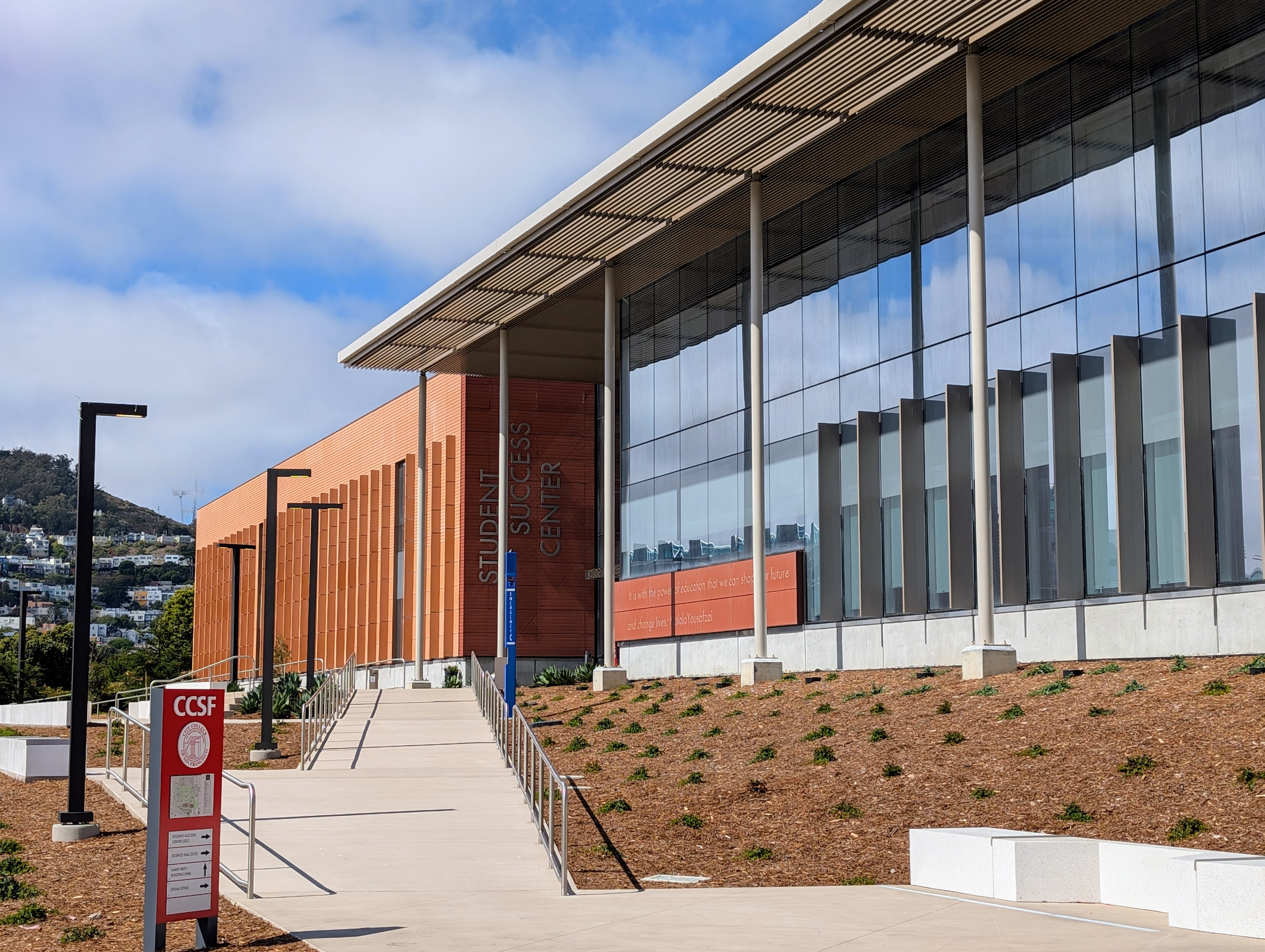
The Student Success Center at the Ocean Campus houses tutoring, counseling, transfer advising, and career services.

In July 2013, the ACCJC elected to take action to terminate the college's accreditation, subject to a one-year review and appeal period. The decision was based on a variety of deficiencies in standards. A Fiscal Crisis and Management Assistance Team report was expected to be released by the end of July 2013. Nearly two months later, San Francisco city attorney Dennis Herrera filed two legal challenges to stop the ACCJC from revoking City College of San Francisco's accreditation alleging conflicts of interest, a faulty evaluation process, and a politically motivated decision-making process. The 2013 decision to revoke accreditation in 2014 was put on hold pending the legal challenges. In January 2015, with the legal conflict still ongoing, ACCJC said that CCSF remained out of compliance with standards in 32 areas but granted the college a two-year extension for resolving these issues and avoiding a shutdown.

In 2017, ACCJC reaffirmed the college's accreditation for seven years. It operates with approximately $22M annual Stabilization funding from the California legislature which will expire in 2021. For the 2017/18 Fiscal year, the Board of Trustees approved a $49M Deficit budget.

==== Free City College ====
After the accreditation crisis in 2012, CCSF was having low student enrollment issues. In the years that followed the crisis, student enrollment went from 90,000 students down to 60,000 students by 2017. In February 2017, the City of San Francisco began offering free tuition at CCSF for San Francisco city residents in a two year pilot program called "Free City College". The money for the free tuition was raised from Proposition W, a transfer of properties tax on property sold over $5 million. By Fall 2017, student enrollment was increased by 16% (4,900 students). However, a financial audit in 2019 showed that the college was still in dire straits with deficits for at least three years and nearly $14 million more in spending than revenue during the previous fiscal year.

== Organization and administration ==
CCSF is part of the San Francisco Community College District which is independent and co-extensive with the City and County of San Francisco and part of the California Community Colleges System. The district's board of trustees is elected by San Francisco residents. District funds are allocated from the state legislature, local property taxes, student tuition and fees, lottery funds, sales tax funds, and miscellaneous sources.

Unique to California Community Colleges, CCSF support staff are pooled in the County of San Francisco's Civil Service system, so they may transfer between the community college and other City/County of San Francisco departments and participate in the City and County's benefit programs. This is an exception to academic independence enabled by Education Code section 88137. College administrators do not have control of the hiring and placement of classified staff. Although it allows for benefit and seniority portability, CCSF classified staff are not paid at the same rate as their equivalent in other cities/county departments, so transfer to the college is effectively a demotion.

City College of San Francisco locations are policed by the San Francisco Community College District Police Department, which has sworn officers and unsworn security guards.

The Foundation of the City College of San Francisco is an auxiliary nonprofit organization that provides volunteer and financial assistance to the college. In 2023, it oversaw $29.3 million in assets.

== Academics ==
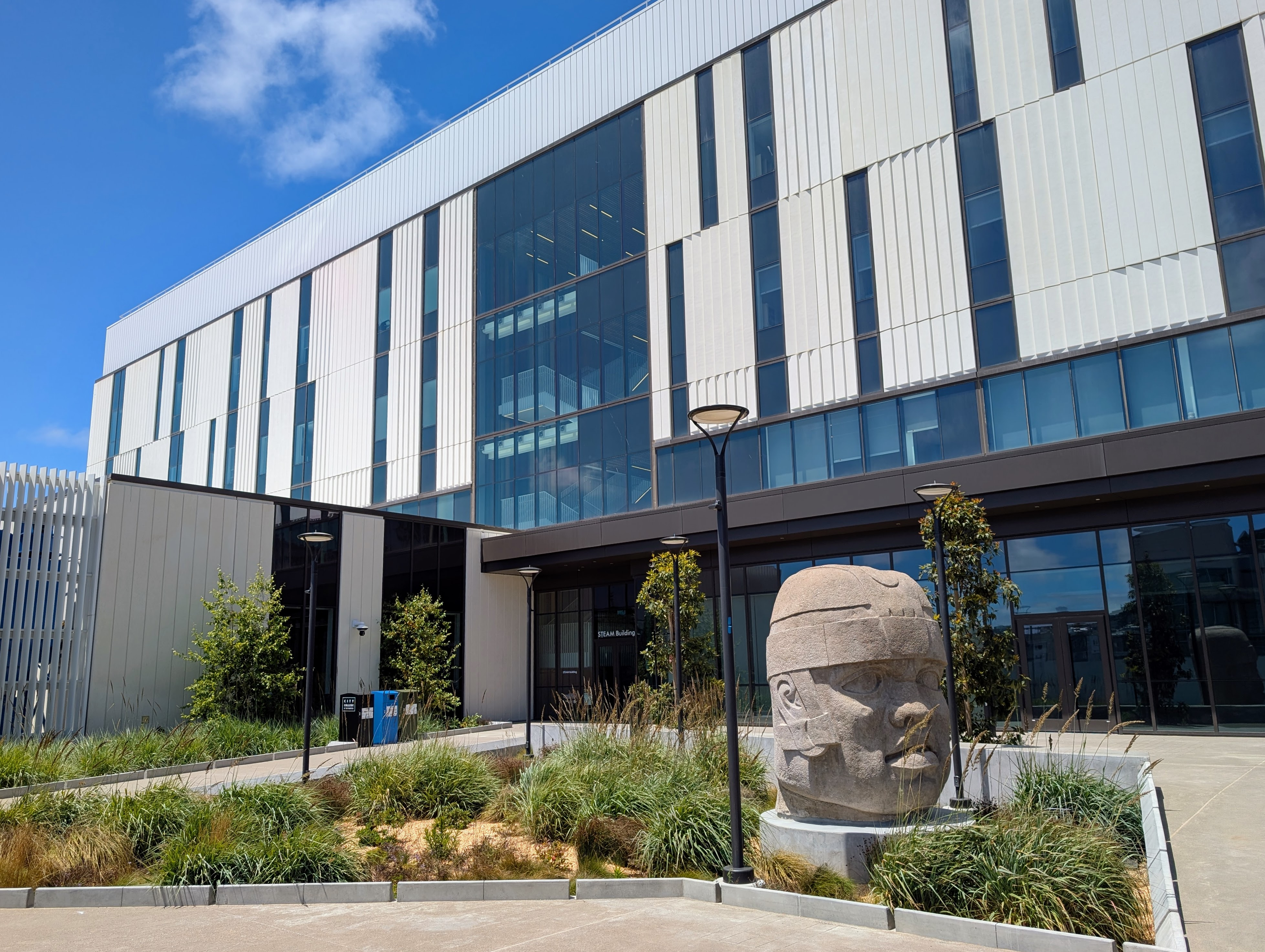
The STEAM (Science, Technology, Engineering, Art, Math) Building at the Ocean Campus.

City College of San Francisco offers 16 Associate of Arts degree programs, 34 Associate Degree for Transfer programs, and 47 Associate of Science programs. In addition, CCSF also offers 108 certificate programs, including eight that are not for credit.

CCSF has a transfer rate to four-year institutions of 62.7% and most students transfer to universities in the California State University and University of California systems.

While the CSU doesn't offer a guaranteed admission program, 35–40% of CCSF's transfer students enroll in San Francisco State University.

7.1% of CCSF transfer students enroll in University of California, Berkeley, making it the second most common transfer destination. UC Davis, UC Irvine, UC Merced, UC Riverside, UC Santa Barbara, and UC Santa Cruz offer Transfer Guaranteed Admission contracts to CCSF students.

=== Schools ===
CCSF consists of eight schools that are divided into departments.

- School of Business, Fashion & Hospitality (5 departments)
- School of English, World Languages and Cultures, and Communication Studies (3 departments)
- School of Fine Applied Communication Arts (10 departments)
- School of Health, Physical Education & Social Services (8 departments)
- School of ESL, International Education & Transitional Studies (3 departments)
- School of Science, Technology, Engineering and Mathematics (13 departments)
- School of Social Sciences, Behavioral Sciences, Ethnic Studies & Social Justice (12 departments)
- School of Library, Academic Resources, Educational Technology, and Online Programs (4 departments)

=== Notable programs ===
The Department of Culinary Arts and Hospitality Studies was founded in 1936 as the Hotel and Restaurant Department and was the oldest hospitality program in the United States. At the Ocean Campus, students and staff in the department operate the school's cafeteria, City Streets, a quick-service outlet in the cafeteria featuring international cuisines, and Chef's Table, a fine dining restaurant. At the Downtown Center, students and staff currently run Educated Palate Cafe, a pop-up bakeshop. Educated Palate was fine-dining restaurant at the center that served American cuisine. The restaurant is temporarily closed.

The school offers courses in nine languages with full courses including American Sign Language, Chinese, French, German, Italian, Japanese, Russian, and Spanish. Degrees available for these language programs include an Associate of Arts degree (AA), an Associate of Arts for Transfer degree (AA-T) or a Certificate of Achievement in languages.

The school also offers Cantonese language classes. In December 2021 there were budget cuts which threatened the status of the program. Alan Wong, a member of the CCSF board, stated that since the Cantonese class does not result in a certificate, the class was in jeopardy. At least two Save Cantonese campaigns were created to save the language classes. Ultimately the school's Cantonese program remained.

== Campus and academic centers ==
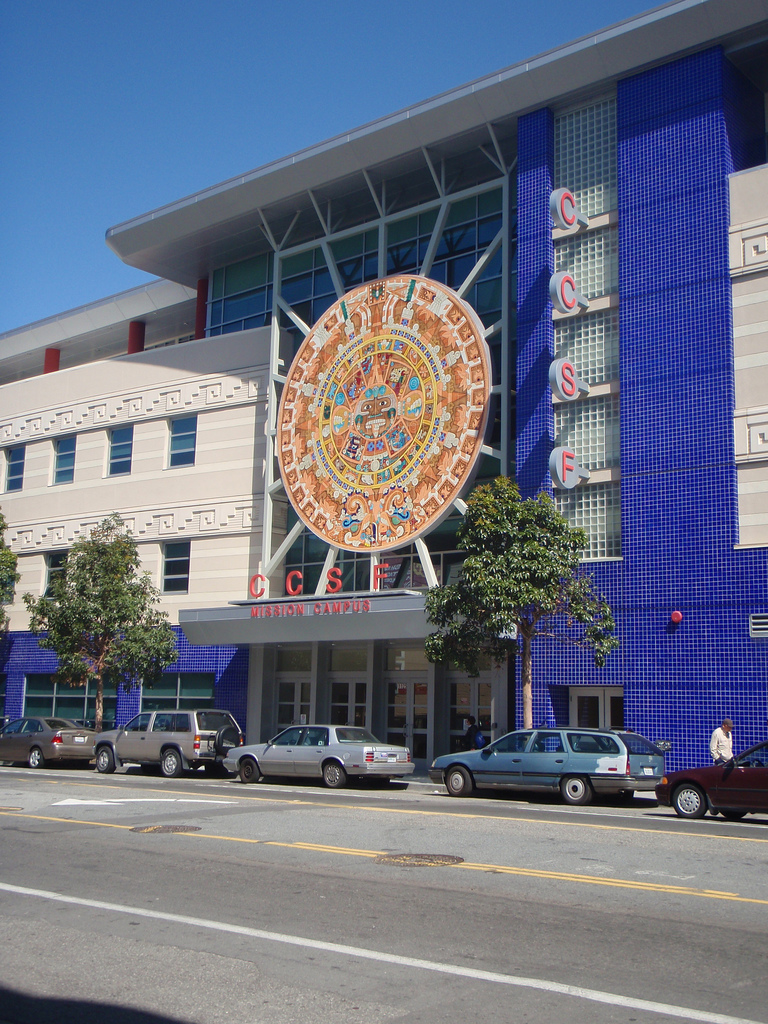
City College of San Francisco, Mission Campus

CCSF officially opened in 1935, during the Depression era, at the Industrial school, a school for juvenile delinquents, at the Ocean/Phelan Avenue site. Instruction began on September 4, 1935, with morning classes held at the University of California Extension Division building on Powell Street and afternoon classes at Galileo High School with students moving between sites using the trolley system at the time. As the student population grew, classes became available at other sites across San Francisco at a variety of sites. As Juila Bergman writes in the book City College of San Francisco, "Thus, in a real sense, the history of the college is a history of San Francisco and its transportation system."

Today, CCSF provides courses at Ocean Campus and five satellite locations around San Francisco. They are commonly called "campuses," but are officially "academic centers" in the state-approved framework of the California Community Colleges System, having less than the range of educational facilities and services offered at a typical community college campus. Courses are also offered online and are available to all residents of California.

=== Active locations ===
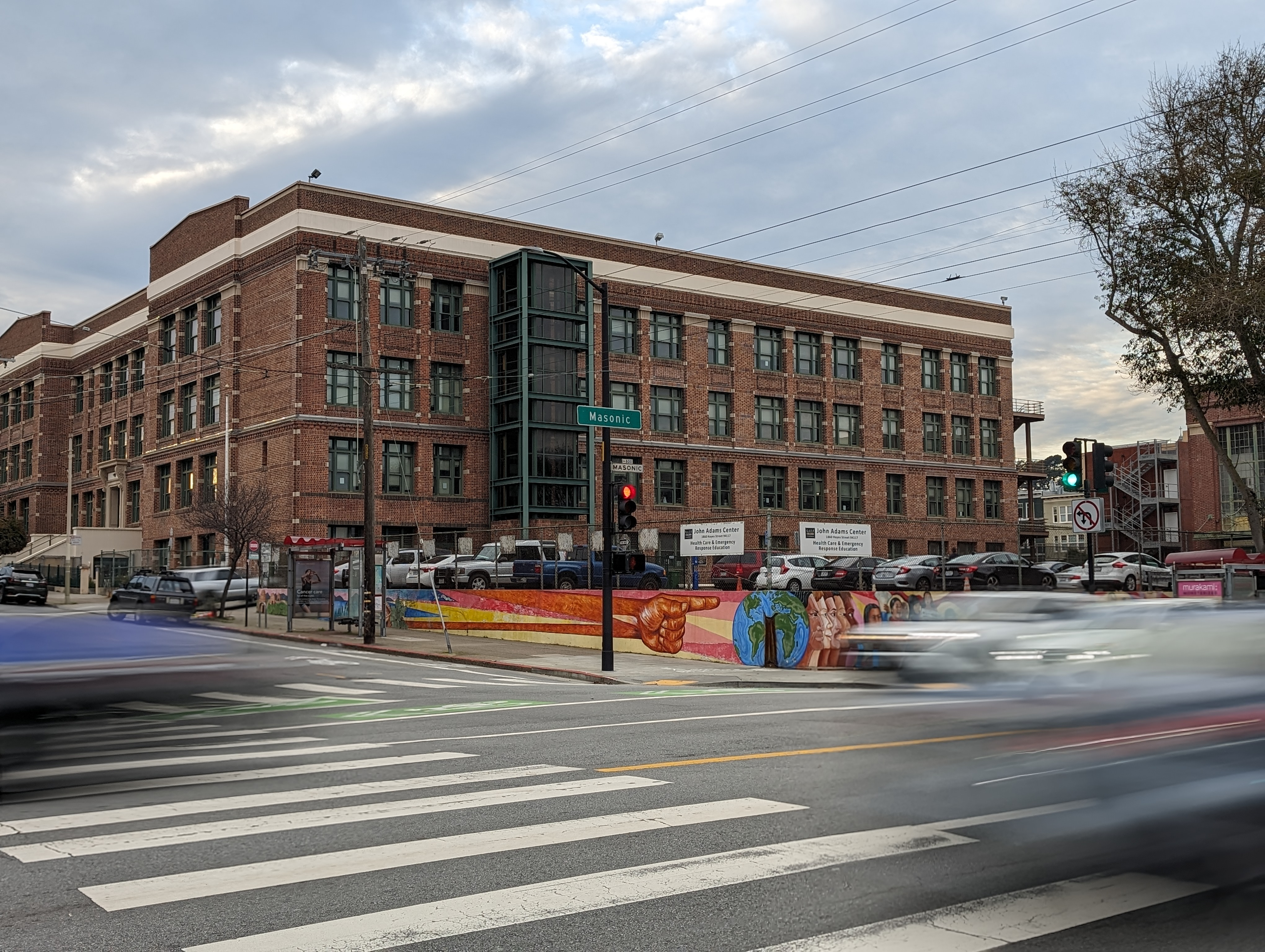
John Adams Center

- Chinatown/North Beach Center, 808 Kearny Street
- Downtown Center, 88 4th Street
- Evans Center, 1400 Evans Avenue
- John Adams Center, 1860 Hayes Street
- Mission Center, 1125 Valencia Street
- Ocean Campus, 50 Frida Kahlo Way (main campus)

=== Recently closed locations ===
- Airport Center, San Francisco International Airport, Bldg. 928 (closed 2020)
- Alemany, renamed as Civic Center, 750 Eddy St./1170 Market Street (closed 2015/2020)
- Fort Mason Center, Fort Mason Center, 1934-Bldg. B (closed 2019)
- Gough Street Site, 31–33 Gough Street (administration) (closed 2016)
- Southeast Center, 1800 Oakdale Avenue (closed 2022)

The Airport Center closed in 2020, following the expiration of CCSF's lease at SFO. The other centers are grandfathered but would not have been permitted to open under the 2012 California Community College guidelines.

== Art on campus ==
Most of the early art on CCSF campus was due to the work of Timothy L. Pflueger, the architect in charge of designing CCSF in the 1930s. Pflueger was on a committee of well-known Beaux-Arts architects organizing and designing the Golden Gate International Exposition (GGIE). In 1940, he organized Art in Action, an exhibit showcasing work by multiple artists. Many of these pieces from GGIE are now permanently housed at the Ocean Campus.

=== Diego Rivera ===
Diego Rivera's work Pan American Unity, originally created for the Golden Gate International Exposition in 1940, has been displayed at the theater at the Ocean Campus of San Francisco City College since 1961. This large mural stands, 22' high and 74' long made up of 5 panels. The mural was entitled by Rivera, “Unión de la Expresión Artistica del Norte y Sur de este Continente” (The Marriage of the Artistic Expression of the North and South of this Continent) but now commonly called Pan American Unity. There are three self-portraits and a portrait on his wife, artist Frida Kahlo within this mural. As of 2014, City College is in the process of supporting The Diego Rivera Mural Project, with goals to return the mural to the position of public importance, stabilize the environment in which it is set, and secure funding to make the project self supportive.

=== Frederick Olmsted Jr. ===
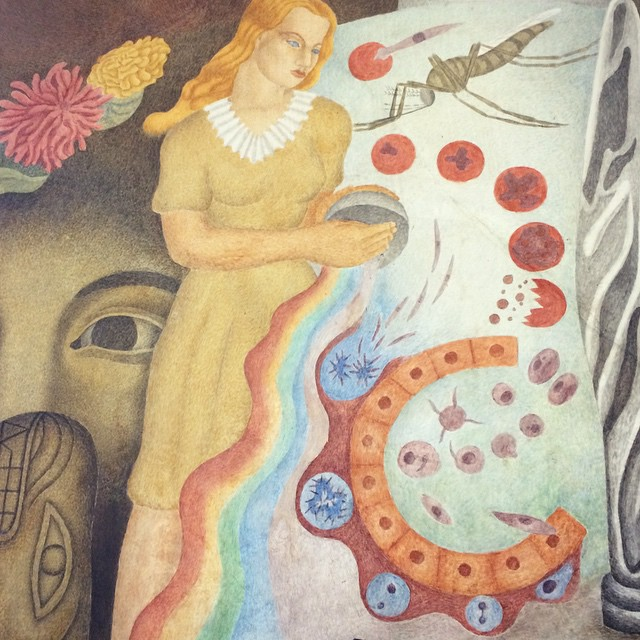
"Theory and Science" mural located at San Francisco City College (CCSF) up close detail, two 12′ x 8′ tempera frescos painted by Frederick Olmsted Jr. in 1941 and restored in 2002, New Deal Agencies: Federal Art Project (FAP)

Frederick Olmsted Jr.'s 1941 Theory and Science mural is located at CCSF's Ocean Campus in the Science Hall's west entrance. This is two 12′ x 8′ tempera fresco murals and depicts a range of careers in the sciences, featuring men, women and people of color doing things such as viewing bacteria through a microscope, conducting field research, and excavating dinosaur remains. Olmsted also created two large, limestone sculptures of Leonardo da Vinci and Thomas Edison heads that are on display in the Ocean Campus middle courtyard. The giant Leonardo da Vinci and Thomas Edison heads were created in 1940 as part of the Golden Gate International Exposition's Art in Action exhibition and later given to CCSF for care and display.

=== Beniamino Bufano ===
Beniamino Bufano was a California-based Italian American sculptor, best known for his large-scale monuments representing peace. Bufano's sculpture Saint Francis of the Guns of 1968 stands at San Francisco City College in front of the Science Building. It is a statue of Saint Francis of Assisi—San Francisco's namesake—made from melted-down guns mixed with bronze to prevent rust from the city's dampness; this work was inspired by that year's assassinations of Martin Luther King Jr. and Robert F. Kennedy. The sculpture is of a 9-ft tall figure of a robed Catholic saint, his arms spread in peaceful greeting. On his robe, Bufano created a mosaic tile mural showing the glowing heads of four of America's assassinated leaders: Abraham Lincoln, Martin Luther King Jr., Robert Kennedy and John F. Kennedy. This was one of Bufano's last works before he died.

=== Dudley C. Carter ===
Dudley C. Carter has three works at the CCSF Ocean Campus, including The Ram sometimes called Mountain Ram, Goddess of the Forest, and The Beast sculptures. Dudley had donated The Ram because he knew it was the school mascot and it had been part of the Golden Gate International Exposition's Arts in Action exhibition. The Ram sculpture stood outside on the campus periodically changing locations from time to time, students would coat it in paint with campus colors red and white. Sometimes rival schools would repaint The Ram in their own school colors. By 1980 The Ram had many layers of paint and damage and in Spring of 1983 it was restored by Carter with use of a pick axe and its original, natural redwood. Currently located in the lobby of Conlan Hall, on the Ocean Campus. The Goddess of the Forest is another redwood sculpture created during GGIE, it is very large standing at 26 feet tall and had a girth at the base of 21 feet. For years this piece was located at Golden Gate Park, until 1986 when it began to show distress and decay. It was then moved to CCSF to an indoor location awaiting restoration.

=== Ignacio Perez Solano ===
In 2004, the then-Governor of Veracruz, Mexico, Miguel Alemán Velazco, presented CCSF with a reproduction of an Olmec colossal head in honor of the new Pan-American Center. The gift, a 14-ton, 9-foot tall replica of "El Rey" (The King) San Lorenzo #1 created in volcanic tuff is now the centerpiece of the proposed Frida Kahlo Garden next to the Diego Rivera Theater at City College of San Francisco. The artist who carved the replica was Ignacio Perez Solano, also known as "il Maestro." This is only one of five Olmec head reproductions in the United States. The Olmecs are viewed by some as the "mother culture" of Mexico.

=== Herman Volz ===
Two 50′ x 45′ low-relief polished marble mosaics by the Swiss-born artist Herman Volz are located in the south portico of San Francisco City College's Science Hall, located on Ocean Campus. The murals are named Organic and Inorganic Science. The imagery of the mosaics represent fields such as physics, chemistry, biology, and mathematics with text accompanying the mural that reads ‘Give me a base and I move the world.’ These murals were originally part of the Golden Gate International Exposition’s Art in Action show in 1940 on Treasure Island before they were moved to the college. The two mosaics took two years to install with a staff of eight workmen, Juan Breda served as assistant mosaicist for the project. The murals were restored in 2005.

== Student life ==
=== Student Life & Leadership ===
The Office of Student Life & Leadership supports with promoting and enhancing the student engagement and leadership experiences for seven Associated Students Councils and more than 40 clubs and student organizations.

Through Associated Students, additional student focused programs and centers are funded including the Book Voucher Program, Dr. Betty Shabazz Family Resource Center, Queer Resource Center, Student Health, Students Supporting Students mentoring program Women's Resource Center, African American Resource Center (AARC), Veteran's Resource Center and CityDream.

Students can also avail themselves of the Fitness Center, nationally ranked intercollegiate sports, and participate in the college's award-winning intercollegiate Speech and Debate Program.

=== Media ===
The Guardsman is the college's student-run newspaper. CCSF's journalism students also publish Etc. Magazine.

The Free Critic was an alternative paper.

=== LGBT community ===
Currently, there is a Queer Alliance student group and a Queer Resource Center on campus. The Queer Resource Center is an informational and advocacy resource center for lesbian, gay, bisexual, transgender, gender queer, intersex, questioning, and straight allies. The Queer Resource Center aims to empower and celebrate its demographic as well as its community, part of which they have supported the addition of new queer studies classes and a new queer-focused associate degree in 2019. The center has participated in anti-violence, anti-homophobia, and anti-transphobia rallies and workshops. The center has struggled with funding although this has caught the attention of politicians, notably the Green Party, whose candidate for board of trustees John Rizzo promised in 2006 funds for more LGBT studies and the Queer Resource Center.

=== Women ===
On campus, there are numerous student activity groups, gender-specific courses, and health services. For example, the Women's Resource Center and Library (Smith Hall, 103–104) offers women on campus an opportunity to network with academic support services and resources, and Project Survive is a campus peer education group working to promote healthy relationships and end abuse and sexual violence.

=== Athletics ===
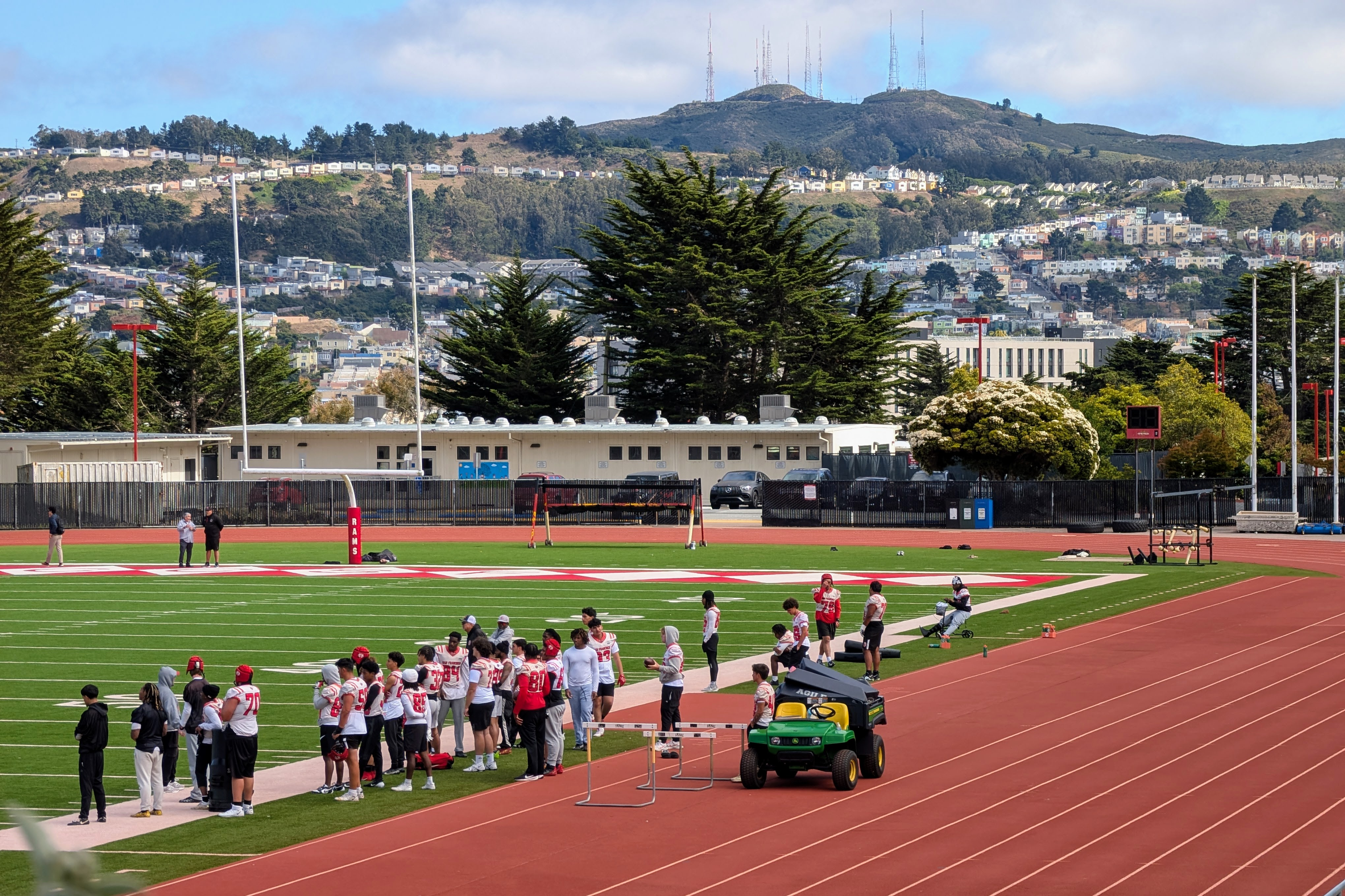
The CCSF Rams football team practices.

==== Teams ====
Intercollegiate athletics are offered for men and women. College teams compete in the CCCAA Coast Conference North Section. Intercollegiate sports include baseball, basketball, cross-country, football, soccer, softball, tennis, track, badminton, volleyball, and judo. These teams are all nicknamed the Rams. City College of San Francisco football teams have won ten national championships. The 1994 CCSF Rams football team compiled a perfect 11–0 record and was ranked No. 1 nationally in the USA Today/National Community College Football Coaches Alliance Poll. The annual rivalry football game is played against the College of San Mateo Football team.

==== Sports facilities ====
All of the CCSF Rams teams are based at the Ocean Campus. The home venue for baseball is Carter Field. Football and track and field use the George M. Rush Stadium. The Soccer Practice Field is north of the stadium. The Wellness Center, south of the stadium, houses staff offices, weight rooms, a swimming pool, locker rooms, classrooms, and an indoor gym. The north and south gyms were located east of the stadium but were replaced with bungalows and a parking lot. Tennis courts are further east.

== Notable people ==
=== Alumni ===
This is a list of notable alumni from City College of San Francisco, listed in alphabetical order by last name.

==== Actors ====
- Bill Bixby, (1934–1993) Actor
- Jann Darlyn, (1929) actress and model
- Barbara Eden, (1931) actress and singer
- Danny Glover, (1946) American actor, film director and activist.
- Lee Meriwether, (1935) actress and former model
- Pat Paulsen, (1927–1997) comedian
- Pat Sheehan, (1931–2006) actress and model
- Hilary Van Dyke, (1970) actress

==== Artists and designers ====
- Lenore Chinn, (1949) a queer Chinese-American artist and activist, best known for her American realist paintings
- Patrick Cowley (1950–1982), queer disco and Hi-NRG dance music composer and recording artist.
- Kenn Davis (1932–2010), surrealist painter and mystery novel writer associated with the Beat generation
- Emory Douglas (1943), designer, illustrator, and Minister of Culture for the Black Panther Party from 1967 until the Party disbanded in the 1980s.
- Chris Johanson, (1968) painter, attended CCSF from 1989–1992.
- Freda Koblick (1920–2011), American acrylic artist and sculptor.
- Barry McGee, (1966) a painter and graffiti artist.
- Manuel Neri, (1930-2021) artist, attended CCSF from 1949–1950
- Win Ng, (1936-1991) ceramics artist, designer, entrepreneur and co-founder of Taylor & Ng
- Sam Tchakalian, (1929-2004) abstract painter and educator

==== Athletes ====
===== Baseball =====
- Joe Angel, radio sports announcer for professional baseball
- Doug Davis, (1975) professional baseball pitcher
- Stan Johnson, (1937–2013) professional baseball outfielder
- Dick Nold, (1953) professional baseball pitcher
- Mike Norris, (1955) professional baseball pitcher
- Walt Williams, (1943–2016)

===== Basketball =====
- Justin Brownlee (born 1988), player in the Philippine Basketball Association
- McKenzie Moore (born 1992), player in the Israeli Basketball Premier League
- Travante Williams (born 1993), player in the Portuguese Basketball League
- Delon Wright, player in the NBA
- Johnnie Bryant, associate head coach of the Cleveland Cavaliers

===== Football =====
- Natey Adjei, (1988) CFL Wide Receiver
- Joe Ayoob, (1984) Arena Football Quarterback
- Tim Brown, (1984) CFL kick Returner/punt returner
- Desmond Bishop, (1984) NFL Linebacker
- Allen Chapman, (1991) Arena Football
- Al Cowlings, (1947) NFL Linebacker
- Vernon Crawford, (1974) NFL Linebacker
- DeJon Gomes, (1989) NFL Safety
- Larry Grant, (1985) NFL Linebacker
- Lavelle Hawkins, (1986) NFL Wide Receiver
- Cole Hikutini, (1994) NFL Tight End
- James Hundon, (1971) NFL Wide Receiver
- Jeremiah Masoli, (1988) CFL Quarterback
- Maurice Purify, (1986) NFL Wide Receiver
- Nick Rolovich, (1979) College Football Head Coach
- O. J. Simpson, (1947-2024) Retired Football Player, Broadcaster, and Actor
- Dick Stanfel, (1927–2015) NFL and Pro Football Hall of Fame
- Lenny Walls, (1979) NFL Cornerback
- Gibril Wilson, (1981) NFL Safety

==== Journalists and writers ====
- Joe Angel, American radio sports announcer for professional baseball
- Monica C. Lozano, (1956) newspaper editor, the publisher and CEO of La Opinión a Spanish language daily newspaper
- Richard Lui, (1972) journalist and news anchor
- Lorene Zarou-Zouzounis, writer and poet.

==== Politics and civil service ====
- Allen Broussard, (1929–1996) an African-American judge and justice of the California Supreme Court
- Saeb Erekat (born 1955), a Palestinian diplomat who previously served as chief of the PLO Steering and Monitoring Committee.
- Martin Jenkins, (1953) former federal judge
- Ed Jew, (1960) former Chinese-American politician, who was convicted of extortion, bribery, and perjury in 2008
- Fred H. Lau, (1949) former chief of police for San Francisco from 1996–2002
- Peggy Pierce, (1954–2013) Nevada politician

==== Other ====
- Ahmed Fouad Alkhatib, Palestinian American activist
- Rita Arauz, lesbian and gay rights activist in Nicaragua
- Dubee, Northern Californian rapper.
- Maxime Faget, (1921–2004) Belizean-born American mechanical engineer and designer of spacecraft
- Gary Kreps, communication scholar, professor and author

=== Faculty ===
This is a list of notable faculty from City College of San Francisco, listed in alphabetical order by last name.

- Margaret Cruikshank, (1940) lesbian activist and educator
- Keith Kerr, (1936) retired brigadier general, gay activist and as of 1995 retired CCSF faculty
- Him Mark Lai, (1925–2009) activist and historian of Chinese America
- Helene Mayer (1910–1953), German and American Olympic champion fencer
- James Torlakson, (1951) printmaker, artist, CCSF professor from 1999 until 2017.
- Doug Siebum, professional audio engineer
- Del M. Anderson, president of the college from 1995 to 1998

== See also ==
- Art in Action, the art exhibition that donated most of the prominent art on-campus to CCSF's Ocean Campus
- Berkeley City College (BCC), a community college located in Berkeley
- California Community College Athletic Association (CCCAA)
- California Community Colleges system
  - Cañada College, a community college located in Redwood City
  - College of Marin, a community college located in Marin
  - College of San Mateo, a community college located in San Mateo
  - Laney College, a community college located in Oakland
  - Merritt College, a community college located in Oakland
  - Skyline College, a community college located in San Bruno
