= Save Cantonese =

American nonprofit organization

- Type: Nonprofit organization
- Established: 2020
- Website: www.savecantonese.org

The Save Cantonese is a 501(c) organization nonprofit organization in the United States that is dedicated to preserving and promoting Cantonese language and culture.

The organization supports advocacy campaigns and engagements to promote and restore Cantonese language classes in K-12 education and in higher education institutions facing program cuts such as Stanford University, University of California, Los Angeles, and City College of San Francisco. The movement began in late 2020 after Stanford University announced budget cuts affecting its Cantonese language program and its sole lecturer, Sik Lee Dennig. The campaign started in response to these cuts. The organization currently has nine staff members and over 200 community members worldwide volunteering for advocacy campaigns and updating resources. The organization has curated a comprehensive Cantonese learning resource library. One of their major campaigns focuses on expanding access to Cantonese education in K-12 schools; the organization also maintains a list of Cantonese Immersion Programs in K-12 curricula across the United States.

The organization hosts educational advocacy events and manages the Cantonese World Map and other resources to raise awareness of the language's decline. Moreover, the Cantonese language has over 80 million speakers worldwide, but the language is under pressure in Hong Kong, due to fears about English and Mandarin encroachment, restriction of functional domains, and the switching from Cantonese to Mandarin starting in secondary school, further headed with concerns about linguistic contraction in Guangdong. Cantonese use also dropped substantially in Guangzhou following government policy despite controversies in the 2010s, see Guangzhou Television Cantonese controversy. Cantonese has often been overshadowed by Mandarin Chinese in school programs as well.

Some schools in diaspora have experimented with dropping the Cantonese diglossia, which has been in place since the 1800s, since Cantonese is formally written down in Standard Written Chinese, essentially identical to modern Mandarin, and only spoken in Cantonese (although Written Cantonese is used down in court transcriptions, linguistics institutes, and in informal contests), thus instead teaching the spoken form directly as Mandarin has led to fears of erasure.

There has been a concerted effort by educational nonprofits and schools to preserve and support the language, especially in concentrated areas of the San Francisco Bay Area and Los Angeles, California. As of 2024, their advocacy events have expanded into over 15 universities across the United States. In 2023, Save Cantonese helped organize students and community members to advocate for a language certificate program at the City College of San Francisco, one of the first community colleges to offer such a program, which also received state funding.

== See also ==
- Language movement
- Cantonese
