= Freda Foh Shen =

American actress

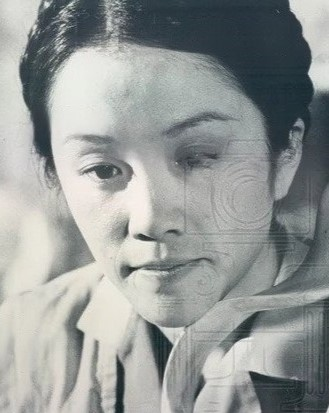
- Foh Shen in 1976
- Born: April 25, 1948 (age 78); Atlanta, Georgia, U.S.
- Other names: Freyda Foh Shien, Freda Fo Shen, Frida Foh Shen, Freda Shen
- Occupation: Actress
- Years active: 1975–present

Freda Foh Shen (born April 25, 1948) is an American actress. She is best known for the voice of Fa Li in the 1998 Disney animated film Mulan and its 2004 direct-to-video sequel Mulan II, and for playing Anne Lee on 9-1-1 (2019–present).

== Early life ==
Foh Shen was born in Atlanta, Georgia, on April 25, 1948, to Chinese parents.

== Career ==
In 1982, Foh Shen played Lady Nijō in Caryl Churchill's play Top Girls at the New York Shakespeare Festival. In 1990, she played Carmen in Jean Genet's play The Balcony at the Hudson Guild Theater in New York City.

In addition to her theater performances, she played the role of Chinese American ceramist Jade Snow Wong in the 1976 PBS historical drama Jade Snow. Since the beginning of the 1980s, Foh Shen has appeared in several television series, including The Cosby Show, Adult Math, Renegade, Party of Five, JAG, 7th Heaven, 24, Desperate Housewives, Cracker, and Boston Legal. She has also appeared in movies including Crossing Delancey (1988), Basic Instinct (1992), Planet of the Apes (2001), The Ladykillers (2004), and a starring role in 2005's Red Doors.

By 2007, she had already had recurring roles in three television series: as Mrs. Lee on Gideon's Crossing, as Dr. Chao on Everwood, and as Dr. Yolanda Perrin on Close to Home. She is also known for her role as Dr. Noriko Weinstein in the crime drama Silk Stalkings. Most recently, she appeared in a 2018 episode of Magnum P.I., and landed a recurring role on the 2019 series 9-1-1.

As a voice actress, Foh Shen has provided the voices of Fa Li in Mulan (1998) and Mulan II (2004), the Chinese food lady in Dude, Where's My Car? (2000), Admiral Alice Liu in the 2002 video game Star Trek: Bridge Commander, and the Narrator in The Mummy: Tomb of the Dragon Emperor (2008).

== Filmography ==
=== Film ===
Year	Title	Role	Notes
1983	Without a Trace	Reporter	
1988	Crossing Delancey	Self-Defense Teacher	
1989	The Dream Team	TV Newscaster	
1989	Longtime Companion	Nurse with Addict	
1990	Funny About Love	Nurse	
1991	Thousand Pieces of Gold	Ah Ling	
1992	Basic Instinct	Berkeley Registrar	
1993	Born Yesterday	Maid	
1996	The Glimmer Man	Polygraph Technician	
1996	Daddy's Girl	Dr. Marsh	Direct-to-video
1997	The Video		
1998	Mulan	Fa Li (voice)	
1999	American Virgin	Marge	Credited as Freda Fo Shen
2000	Dude, Where's My Car?	Chinese Food Lady (voice)	
2001	Planet of the Apes	Bon	
2002	Coastlines	Nurse	
2003	A Mighty Wind	Melinda Barrows	
2004	The Ladykillers	Doughnut Woman	
2004	Harlequin	Colleen's Mom (voice)	Short film
2004	Mulan II	Fa Li (voice)	Direct-to-video
2005	Red Doors	May-Li Wong	
2008	The Mummy: Tomb of the Dragon Emperor	Narrator (voice)	
2009	Star Trek	Kelvin Helmsman	
2010	The Mikado Project	Mrs. O'Malley	
2011	Balls to the Wall	Miss Watson	
2013	The Lone Ranger	Kai	
2014	The Possession of Michael King	Dr. Cox	
2019	Ad Astra	Captain Lu	
2020	Books of Blood	Ellie	

=== Television ===
Year	Title	Role	Notes
1975	Khan!		Episode: "Mask of Deceit"
1976	Pacific Overtures	Shogun's Wife	Television movie
1976	Jade Snow	Jade Snow Wong	Television documentary
1981	Senior Trip	Ticket Agent	Television movie
1984	ABC Afterschool Special	Lynn Watson	Episode: "The Almost Royal Family"
1987	The Cosby Show	Cliff's Patient	Episode: "That's Not What I Said"
1988	The Equalizer	Leslie	Episode: "The Last Campaign"
1990	The Baby-Sitters Club	Mrs. Rioko Kishi	Episode: "Dawn and the Haunted House"
1991	Another World	Doctor Winston	Episode: "#1.6 848"; Credited as Freyda Foh Shen
1992	Those Secrets	Alice	Television movie
1992	Renegade	Social Worker Shen	Episode: "The Talisman"
1992	Doogie Howser, M.D.	Radiologist	Episode: "Will the Real Doogie Howser Please Stand Up"
1993	Silk Stalkings	Dr. Noriko Weinstein	4 episodes
1994–1996	Party of Five	Miss Minor	Episodes: "Homework" and "Spring Breaks: Part 2"
1995	Sisters	Dr. Michelle Peck	Episode: "No Pain, No Gain"
1995	New York News	Jean	Episode: "Fun City"
1995	Courthouse	Nurse	Episode: "Injustice for All"
1996	Alien Nation: Millennium	Vivian Fairbanks	Television movie
1996	Nowhere Man	Nurse Whiteford	Episode: "Forever Jung"
1996	Buddies	Miss Maekawa	Episode: "The PSA Story"
1996	Nash Bridges		Episode: "'Til Death Do Us Part"
1996	Cracker	DCI Janet Lee Cheung	Episode: "White Ghost"
1997	Arliss	Kikomo	Episode: "The World at Your Feet"
1997–2004	JAG	Lieutenant Commander Chen / Captain Lynda Chang	Episodes: "Heroes" and "Coming Home"
1997–1999	Chicago Hope	Dr. Seaties / Dr. Aldmen	Episodes: "Growing Pains" and "Team Play"
1998	The Wonderful World of Disney	Mrs. Yung	Episode: "Safety Patrol"
1998	The Tiger Woods Story	Tida Woods	Television movie
1998–1999	ER	Audiologist	3 episodes
1998–2000	7th Heaven	Principal Howard / Ms. Gordan	3 episodes
1998	To Have & to Hold	Judge Alice Selleck	Episodes: "These Boots Were Made for Stalking" and "Who's Sorry Next?"
1999	L.A. Doctors	Nurse Laura Chase	Episode: "Denial"
1999	Invisible Child		Television movie
1999	Rugrats	Pam (voice)	Episode: "Runaway Reptar: Part 1"
1999	Horse Sense	Arlene	Television movie
2000	Miracle in Lane 2	Dr. Kwan	Television movie
2000	Strong Medicine	Mrs. Simmons	Episode: "Do No Harm"
2000–2001	Gideon's Crossing	Mrs. Lee	7 episodes
2000	Family Law		Episode: "Telling Lies"
2001	The Division	Yumiko Akida	Episode: "Mother's and Daughters"
2001	Port Charles	Suzanne	5 episodes
2002	Roswell	Dean Hackett	Episode: "Panacea"
2002	The Court	Legal Counsel Reed	Episode: "Life Sentence"
2002	The Agency	Curator	Episode: "Moo"
2002	Without a Trace	Irene Taft	Episode: "Little Big Man"
2002	24	Doctor	2 episodes
2002	For the People	Marti Kino	Episode: "Handle with Care"
2003	The Practice	Judge Amy Okubo	Episode: "Equal Justice"
2004	NTSB: The Crash of Flight 323	Savannah Cummings	Television movie
2004	Century City	Judge Levinson	Episode: "A Mind Is a Terrible Thing to Lose"
2004	Jack & Bobby	Miriam Chen-Pew	Episode: "An Innocent Man"
2004	Desperate Housewives	Dr. Cheng	Episode: "Guilty"
2005	Everwood	Dr. Chao	5 episodes
2006	Boston Legal	Dr. Ann Kumi	Episode: "Smile"
2006–2007	Close to Home	Dr. Yolanda Perrin	5 episodes
2007	Primal Doubt	Detective Maggie Conrad	Television movie
2008	Days of Our Lives	Eleanor Thomas	2 episodes
2009	The Mentalist	Korean Store Owner	Episode: "Red John's Footsteps"
2009	House	Cecile	Episode: "Epic Fail"
2009	Grey's Anatomy	Missy Grant	Episode: "Invasion"
2010	Private Practice	Judge	Episode: "Pulling the Plug"
2010	The Defenders	Judge Sato	Episode: "Nevada v. Carter"
2010	Law & Order: LA	Forrester's Lawyer	Episode: "Pasadena"
2011–2013	Franklin & Bash	Judge Leslie Hong	3 episodes
2012–2018	Elementary	Mary Watson	3 episodes
2013	LearningTown	Wand-A	3 episodes
2014	Grimm	Lani Tomas	Episode: "Mommy Dearest"
2016	Bones	FBI AD Courtney Schwartz	Episode: "The Last Shot at a Second Chance"
2017	S.W.A.T.	Dean Hargrove	Episode: "Radical"
2017–2018	Andi Mack	Aunt Mei	Episodes: "Chinese New Year" and "Howling at the Moon Festival"
2018	Designated Survivor	President Han	Episode: "Summit"
2018	Magnum P.I.	Kitty Layton	Episode: "The Woman Who Never Died"
2018	How to Get Away with Murder	Dr. Phillips	Episode: "It's Her Kid"
2019	The Fix	Judge Sandra Song	Episodes: "The Fugitive" and "Making a Murderer"
2019–present	9-1-1	Anne Lee	Recurring cast
2023	The Company You Keep	Grace Hill	Main role

=== Video games ===
Year	Title	Role	Notes
2002	Star Trek: Bridge Commander	Admiral Alice Liu (voice)	
