= Taylor & Ng =

Bespoke kitchenware store and book publisher

Taylor & Ng logo designed by Win Ng

Taylor & Ng, founded in 1965, is a retailer of Asian-inspired cooking supplies and kitchen furnishings made popular in the 1970s and 1980s. More recently the company began selling products online.

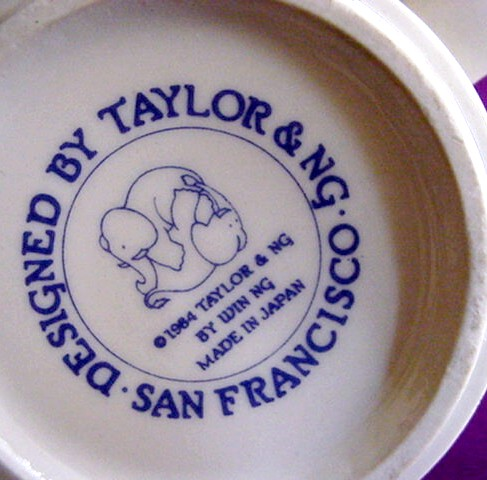
Logo found at the bottom of the mugs

== History ==
The company was founded in 1960 by artists Spaulding Taylor and Win Ng under the name Environmental Ceramics, and later changed to Taylor & Ng. In the 1970s and 1980s Taylor & Ng was a very popular department store of handcrafts that operated in San Francisco.

With the addition of Win Ng's brother, Norman Ng, as president, and Norman's wife Natalie Ng as comptroller, the business grew from a small ceramics shop on Howard Street (in San Francisco) into a major producer and retailer of housewares and owning a multi-level emporium shop at Embarcadero Center. There were also stores at other Bay Area locations as well a Taylor & Ng shop inside Macy’s in New York. These products sold heavily through Macy's and other major department stores and housewares retailers throughout the U.S. during the late 1970s and 1980s.

Win Ng's whimsical designs and animal drawings became a thematic focal point for many extremely popular Taylor & Ng products, from coffee mugs to kitchen aprons, pot holders, and dishtowels. These products sold heavily through Macy's and other major department stores and housewares retailers throughout the U.S. during the late 1970s and 1980s. He created pottery, book designs and linens for over 20 years.

In 1977, Taylor & Ng purchased a warehouse space at 67-69 Belcher St, in San Francisco's Duboce Triangle neighborhood and refurbished the 67 Belcher side only.

The San Francisco department store closed in 1985 in order to focus the business on wholesale. By this time, Spaulding Taylor, Win Ng, and Natalie Ng had left the business, and Norman Ng pressed on, focusing on wholesale. In 1997, Norman sold the company. An online retailer with the same name, Taylor & Ng, features reissues of old company designs.

== Cookbooks ==
The department store was known for the signature designs and illustrations by Win Ng. The company also published a number of popular cookbooks which also featured the artwork of Win Ng.

- Schafer, Violet (1971). Herbcraft, A Compendium of Myths, Romance. Win Ng (Illustrator). San Francisco, California: Yerba Buena Press, Random House Trade Paperbacks. ISBN 9780912738000.
- Schafer, Violet; Schafer, Charles (1972). Wokcraft, a Stirring Compendium of Chinese Cookery. Win Ng (Illustrator) (1 ed.). Random House Trade & Taylor & Ng. ISBN 0912738014.
- Schafer, Violet (1973). Eggcraft: A Compendium of Folklore, Fancies & Foods. Win Ng (Illustrator). San Francisco, California: Taylor & Ng, Yerba Buena Press. ISBN 0394709837.
- Cox, Janet (1973). PlantCraft: A Growing Compendium of Sound Indoor Gardening with Sound. Win Ng (Illustrator), Spaulding Taylor (Photographer), Kenneth Ziegenfuss (Contributor). San Francisco, California: Taylor & Ng, Yerba Buena Press. ISBN 0912738022.
- Schafer, Violet; Schafer, Charles (1974). Breadcraft, A Connoisseurs Collection Of Bread Recipes. San Francisco, California: Yerba Buena Press. ISBN 9780912738048.
- Schafer, Violet; Schafer, Charles Louis (1975). Teacraft, A Treasure of Romance, Rituals, and Recipes. Win Ng (Illustrator). San Francisco, CA: Yerba Buena Press, Random House. ISBN 0-91273806-5.
- Gin, Margaret (1975). Ricecraft: A Gathering of Rice Cookery, Culture and Customs. Win Ng (Illustrator). Taylor & Ng. ISBN 9780394730509.
- Schafer, Violet; Schafer, Charles (1976). Coffee, A Connoisseur View of Coffee, It's Lore, Varieties, Brewing Methods, Equipment, and Companion Foods. Win Ng (Illustrator). San Francisco: Taylor & Ng. ISBN 978-0912738086.
- Wong, Irene (1977). Great Asia Steam Book. Nadine Ohara (Photography), David Fisher (Cover). Brisbane, California: Taylor & Ng. ISBN 9780912738116.
- Yee, Rhoda (1977). Dim Sum: The Delicious Secrets of Home-Cooked Chinese Tea Lunch. Win Ng (Illustrator) (1 ed.). Taylor & Ng. ISBN 9780912738109.
- Zinkhon, Robert W. (1978). No Pressure Steam Cooking. Illustrations by Michael Pearce, Design by Jane Walsh (1 ed.). Brisbane, CA: Taylor and Ng. ISBN 091273812X.
- Chatfield-Taylor, Joan (1980). Picnics, How to Successfully Plan, Prepare, & Assemble A Savory Outdoor Meal Event - With Time-Saving Ideas And Delicious Worldly Recipes. Andrew J. Cohen (Illustrator). Brisbane, California: Taylor & Ng, Random House. ISBN 0912738138.
- Swoke Kit: The Secret Chinese Method of Tea Smoking & Barbecuing in a Wok. Taylor & Ng. 1983.
- Yee, Rhoda (1982). Szechwan & Northern Cookery: From Hot to Cold. San Francisco: Taylor & Ng. ISBN 978-0912738147.
