= San Francisco Nature Education =

American non-profit organization

San Francisco Nature Education is a non-profit environmental education organization in San Francisco, California that provides interactive environmental education programs for the development of leadership and stewardship in youth and adults. It was founded by Nancy DeStefanis, who serves as its executive director.

San Francisco Nature Education provides educational programs that focus primarily on students from underserved communities. The programs expose students to nature and educate them about local and migratory birds, recycling, and conservation. Local parks, such as Golden Gate Park and Crissy Field, part of the Golden Gate National Recreation Area, are used as natural classrooms to observe local and migratory birds and to provide inspiring and engaging natural experiences. San Francisco Nature Education supports and augments the State of California's Content Standards by teaching Kindergarten through 5th grade students through science, language arts, creative arts, and theater.

== School programs ==
Science and Nature for Underserved Youth, serves over 1,200 elementary school children each year from the San Francisco Unified School District. School programs are fee-based. Partial scholarships are available. Through in-class activities and field studies, students develop observation skills, critical thinking, and teamwork.

The third grade school year culminates in San Francisco Nature Education's annual Bird Calling Contest. Teams of students choose a local bird, learn its call and plumage, and make their own costumes. They also research interesting facts about their bird and weave the facts into a skit. San Francisco Nature Education naturalists teach the contestants the calls and natural history of the birds.

== Public programs ==
Heron Watch, Birding for Everyone, and Heron's Head Park Public Tours are special Saturday programs. The public programs provide an opportunity to observe nature for the entire community . For many participants, the experience of observing a bird happens for the first time at a public program. Public tours are located in Heron's Head Park in the Bayview-Hunter's Point neighborhood of San Francisco. Public programs are located in the San Francisco Botanical Garden and Stow Lake in Golden Gate Park.

- Birding for Everyone. On the first Saturday of every month, SFNE naturalists lead guided walks through the San Francisco Botanical Garden in Golden Gate Park. These naturalist-led walks through the micro-habitats of the San Francisco Botanical Garden in Golden Gate Park search for California quail and other birds that stop off here to rest or nest. Co-sponsored by San Francisco Botanical Garden and Golden Gate Audubon Society.
- Heron Watch. This is an interpretive program that starts in April. The public can experience the excitement of these 4-foot-tall (1.2 m) birds with 6-foot (1.8 m) wingspans flying in and out of the nests-brooding the chicks, feeding the chicks, etc. Naturalists and interns from San Francisco Nature Education are stationed at the observation site with spotting scopes, ready to offer views into great blue heron nests and to answer questions.
- Public Tours of Heron's Head Park in San Francisco. On first Saturdays in spring, Lowell High School Interns conduct tours of this site just past Pier 94, near Hunter's Point. Interns lead tours and are equipped with spotting scopes. These tours hope to see many of the 100 birds that have been sighted at Heron's Head Park, including the black-necked stilt and the killdeer.
- Youth Naturalist Intern Program. Middle and high school student volunteers are trained to serve as interpreters and naturalists for the Birding for Everyone and Heron Watch programs as well as for the Heron's Head Park Public Tours.

SFNE has served over 7000 adults and children through public programs.

== SF Nature in the media ==
- KPIX Channel 5 News, April 2005, Jefferson Award: SF Woman Shows Nature's Beauty to City Youth
- San Francisco Chronicle, April 2005, The Jefferson Award: Nancy DeStefanis, naturalist
- Sunset Beacon/Richmond Review, February 2005, "Heron Lady" Shares Love of Majestic Birds with Public
- California Academy of Sciences - California Wild, Spring 2004, In Pursuit of Science: Showbirds In Fourth Grade
- San Francisco Chronicle, Outdoor Section, March 27, 2003, Stow Lake's strictly for the birds - Former activist inspires children to avian activity
- San Francisco Nature Education " '..had a wonderful impact on them,' said third-grade teacher David Scott. "When you have passion, it shows, and the children pick up on that passion." It's a passion the children seem to enjoy. '“I think it’s more exciting learning things outside,” said third grader Cecilia Alvarado.'" -- KPIX 5's Jefferson's Award Coverage
