= Nancy DeStefanis =

American educator

Nancy H. DeStefanis is an American environmental educator, field ornithologist and lecturer. She is credited for discovering and documenting the first colony of great blue herons to nest in San Francisco in 1993, and for monitoring them for the San Francisco Bay Bird Observatory every year since then—an activity that earned her the nickname of "Heron Lady of Golden Gate Park". She features in Heron Island (1998), a short documentary directed by Judy Irving about the heronry of Stow Lake in San Francisco's Golden Gate Park. In 2005 she received the Jefferson Award for Public Service.

DeStefanis is the founder and executive director of San Francisco Nature Education, a nonprofit introducing children in underserved schools to urban nature conservation and science. Prior to working as an environmental educator, DeStefanis was an attorney who served as a community organizer for the United Farm Workers Union and as executive director of California Women Lawyers.
