= Golden Gate Park =

Public park in San Francisco, California

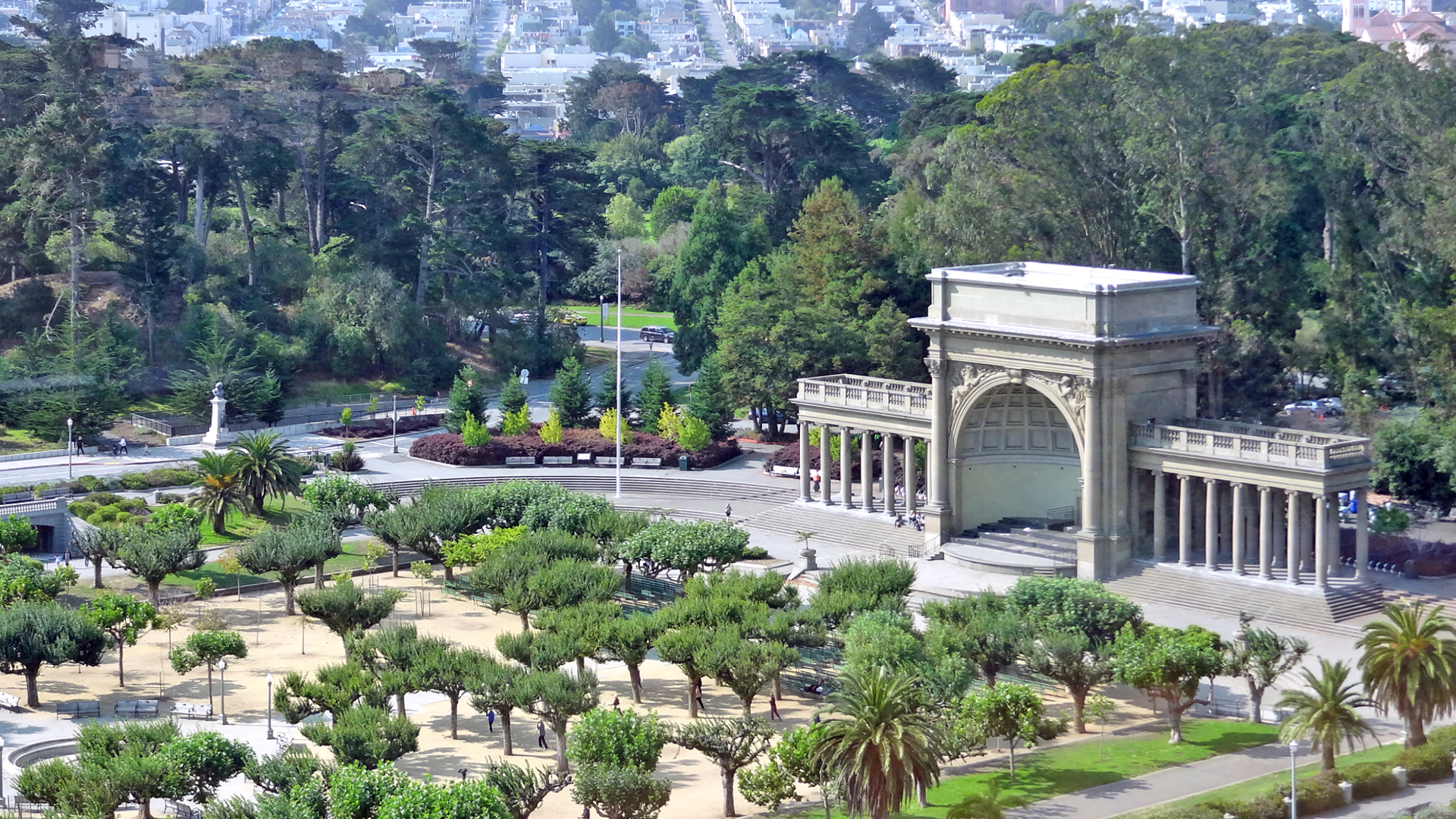
- Spreckels Temple of Music and Music Concourse as seen from the de Young Museum in Golden Gate Park
- Interactive map of Golden Gate Park
- Type: Urban Park
- Location: San Francisco, California, United States
- Coordinates: 37°46′11″N 122°28′37″W
- Area: 1,017 acres (4.12 km^{2})
- Opened: April 4, 1870
- Owner: San Francisco Recreation & Parks Department
- Operator: San Francisco Recreation & Parks Department
- Visitors: about 24 million annually
- Open: All year, 24 hours
- Public transit: : : 18, 5, 5R, 44, 33, 7, 43, 28
- Golden Gate Park
- U.S. National Register of Historic Places
- U.S. Historic district
- Architects: William Hammond Hall; John McLaren
- Architectural style: Olmsted, Vaux & Co.-influenced
- NRHP reference No.: 04001137
- Added to NRHP: October 15, 2004

Golden Gate Park is an urban park between the Richmond and Sunset districts on the West Side of San Francisco, California, United States. It is the largest urban park in the city, containing 1,017 acres (412 ha), and the third-most visited urban park in the United States, with an estimated 24 million visitors annually. Part of the natural area is old-growth forest and recognized by the Old-Growth Forest Network.

The creation of a large park in San Francisco was first proposed in the 1860s. In 1865, landscape architect Frederick Law Olmsted proposed a park designed with species native to San Francisco. That plan was rejected in favor of a Central Park-style park designed by engineer William Hammond Hall. The park was built atop shore and sand dunes in an unincorporated area known as the Outside Lands. Construction centered on planting trees and non-native grasses to stabilize the dunes that covered three-quarters of the park. The park opened in 1870.

Main attractions include cultural institutions such as the de Young Museum, California Academy of Sciences, and the Japanese Tea Garden; attractions such as the Conservatory of Flowers, the San Francisco Botanical Garden, the Beach Chalet, the Golden Gate Park windmills, and the National AIDS Memorial Grove. Recreational activities include bicycling, pedal boating, and concerts and events such as Outside Lands music festival and Hardly Strictly Bluegrass. Golden Gate Park is accessible by car and by public transportation.

Golden Gate Park earned the designation of National Historic Landmark and of California Historic Resource in 2004. The park is administered by the San Francisco Recreation & Parks Department, which began in 1871 to oversee the park's development. Golden Gate Park is over three miles (4.8 km) long east to west, and about half a mile (0.8 km) north to south.

== History ==
=== Development ===
A map of notable attractions at Golden Gate Park
1 AIDS Memorial Grove
2 Beach Chalet
3 Botanical Garden
4 California Academy of Sciences
5 Conservatory of Flowers
6 de Young Museum
7 Dutch Windmill
8 Japanese Tea Garden
9 Kezar Stadium
10 Lloyd Lake
11 Music Concourse
12 Murphy Windmill
13 Polo Fields
14 Spreckels Lake
15 Strawberry Hill
16 Blue Heron Lake Boathouse

In the 1860s, San Franciscans felt the need for a spacious public park similar to Central Park, which was then taking shape in New York City. Golden Gate Park was carved out of unpromising sand and shore dunes that were known as the Outside Lands, in an unincorporated area west of San Francisco's then-current borders. In 1865, Frederick Law Olmsted proposed a plan for a park using native species suited for San Francisco's dry climate. The proposal was rejected in favor of a Central Park-style park needing extensive irrigation.

Conceived ostensibly for recreation, the underlying purpose of the park was housing development and the westward expansion of the city. Field engineer William Hammond Hall prepared a survey and topographic map of the park site in 1870 and became its commissioner in 1871. He was later named California's first state engineer and developed an integrated flood control system for the Sacramento Valley. The park drew its name from the nearby Golden Gate Strait.

The plan and planting were developed by Hall and his assistant, John McLaren, who had apprenticed in Scotland, home of many of the 19th-century's best professional gardeners. John McLaren, when asked by the Park Commission if he could make Golden Gate Park "one of the beauty spots of the world," replied saying, "With your aid gentleman, and God be willing, that I shall do." He also promised that he'd "go out into the country and walk along a stream until he found a farm, and that he'd come back to the garden and recreate what nature had done."

The initial plan called for grade separations of transverse roadways through the park, as Frederick Law Olmsted had provided for Central Park, but budget constraints and the positioning of the Arboretum and the Concourse ended the plan. In 1876, the plan was almost replaced by one for a racetrack, favored by "the Big Four" millionaires: Leland Stanford, Mark Hopkins, Collis P. Huntington, and Charles Crocker. Stanford, who was president of the Southern Pacific Railroad, was also one of the owners of the Ocean Railroad Company, which ran from Haight Street across the park to its south border, then out to the beach and north to a point near Cliff House.

Gus Mooney claimed land adjacent to the park on Ocean Beach. Many of Mooney's friends also staked claims and built shanties on the beach to sell refreshments to the patrons of the park. Hall resigned, and the remaining park commissioners followed. In 1882 Governor George C. Perkins appointed Frank M. Pixley, founder and editor of The Argonaut, to the board of commissioners of San Francisco's Golden Gate Park. Pixley was adamant that the Mooney's shanties be eliminated, and he found support with the San Francisco Police for park security. Pixley favored Stanford's company by granting a fifty-year lease on the route that closed the park on three sides to competition. By 1886, the original plan was back on track, when streetcars delivered over 47,000 people to Golden Gate Park on one weekend afternoon, out of a population of 250,000 in the city.

The first stage of the park's development centered on planting trees in order to stabilize the dunes that covered three-quarters of the park's area. In order to transform the sand dunes into parkland, John McLaren grew bent grass seeds obtained from France for two years. Once the seeds were grown, he planted them over the sand to hold the ground together. After this success, McLaren introduced new species of plants to the land, and added over 700 new types of trees to California within the span of one year.

By 1875, about 60,000 trees, mostly Eucalyptus globulus, Monterey pine, and Monterey cypress, had been planted. By 1879, that figure more than doubled to 155,000 trees over 1,000 acres (400 ha). Within his lifetime, McLaren is credited to have planted over two million trees within northern California as a whole. Another accomplishment of John McLaren is his creation of an open walking space along the Pacific shoreline on the western boundary of the park. Despite obstacles such as heavy tides and winds that carried sand inland towards the park, McLaren was able to build an esplanade by stacking thousands of tree boughs over the course of 20 years.

When he refused to retire at the customary age of 60 the San Francisco city government was bombarded with letters: when he reached 70, a charter amendment was passed to exempt him from forced retirement. On his 92nd birthday, two thousand San Franciscans attended a testimonial dinner that honored him as San Francisco's number one citizen. He lived in McLaren Lodge in Golden Gate Park until he died in 1943, aged 96. McLaren Avenue, in Sea Cliff, near Lincoln Park is named after him.

In 1903, a pair of Dutch-style windmills were built at the extreme western end of the park. These pumped water throughout the park. The north windmill was restored to its original appearance in 1981 and is adjacent to Queen Wilhelmina tulip garden, a gift of Queen Wilhelmina of the Netherlands. These are planted with tulip bulbs for winter display and other flowers in appropriate seasons. The Murphy Windmill in the southwest corner of the park was restored in September 2011.

=== 1906 earthquake relief ===
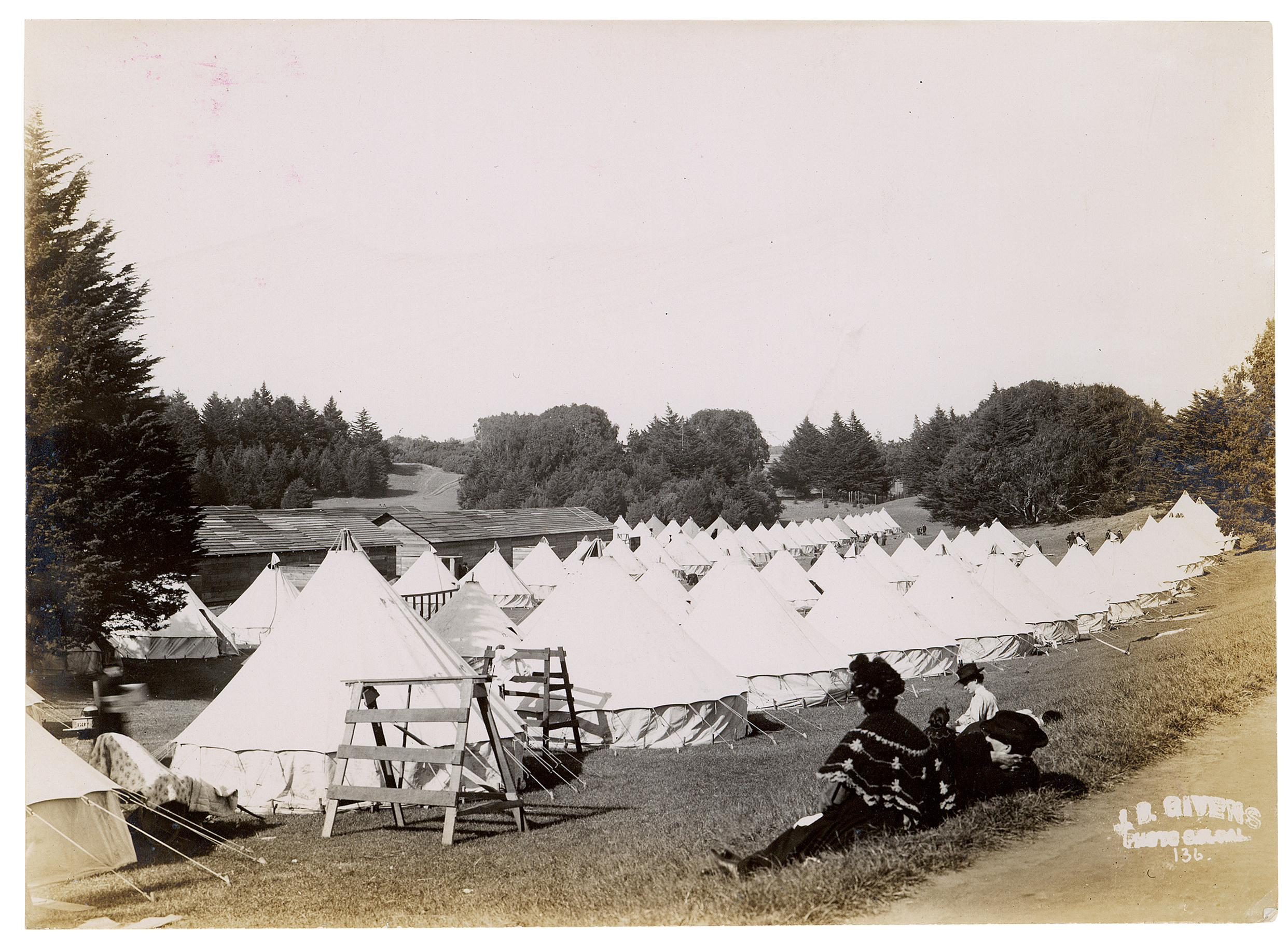
Temporary shelters after the 1906 earthquake

After the great earthquake of San Francisco in 1906, Golden Gate Park became a site of refuge for many who found themselves without shelter. The undeveloped Outside Lands became a prime location to house these masses of people, and "earthquake shacks" popped up all throughout the area. Of the 26 official homeless encampments in the Golden Gate Park region, 21 were under the control of the United States Army.

The United States Army housed 20,000 people in military style encampments, and 16,000 of the 20,000 refugees were living at the Presidio. Within the Presidio were four major encampments including a camp exclusively for Chinese immigrants. Despite being simple lodgings, the army organized 3,000 tents into a geometric grid complete with streets and addresses. "The Army constructed a virtual town with large residential barracks [with temporary] tented housing, latrines and bathhouses, laundries, and other services."

Not only was the standard of military organization high, but the social organization was also at an acceptable standard despite the aftermath of the earthquake and fires. Reports indicate that small communities formed within the tent neighborhoods. The children of the refugees established play areas, and the adults congregated in the mess halls to socialize.

In June 1906, the Presidio tent camps were shut down. To replace these tents the city of San Francisco built more permanent living quarters. As mentioned earlier these earthquake shacks were built to house those still homeless after the earthquake and subsequent fires. Army Union carpenters built the shacks, and residents paid off the cost of construction at a rate of two dollars a month for twenty-five months.

=== Early 20th century ===
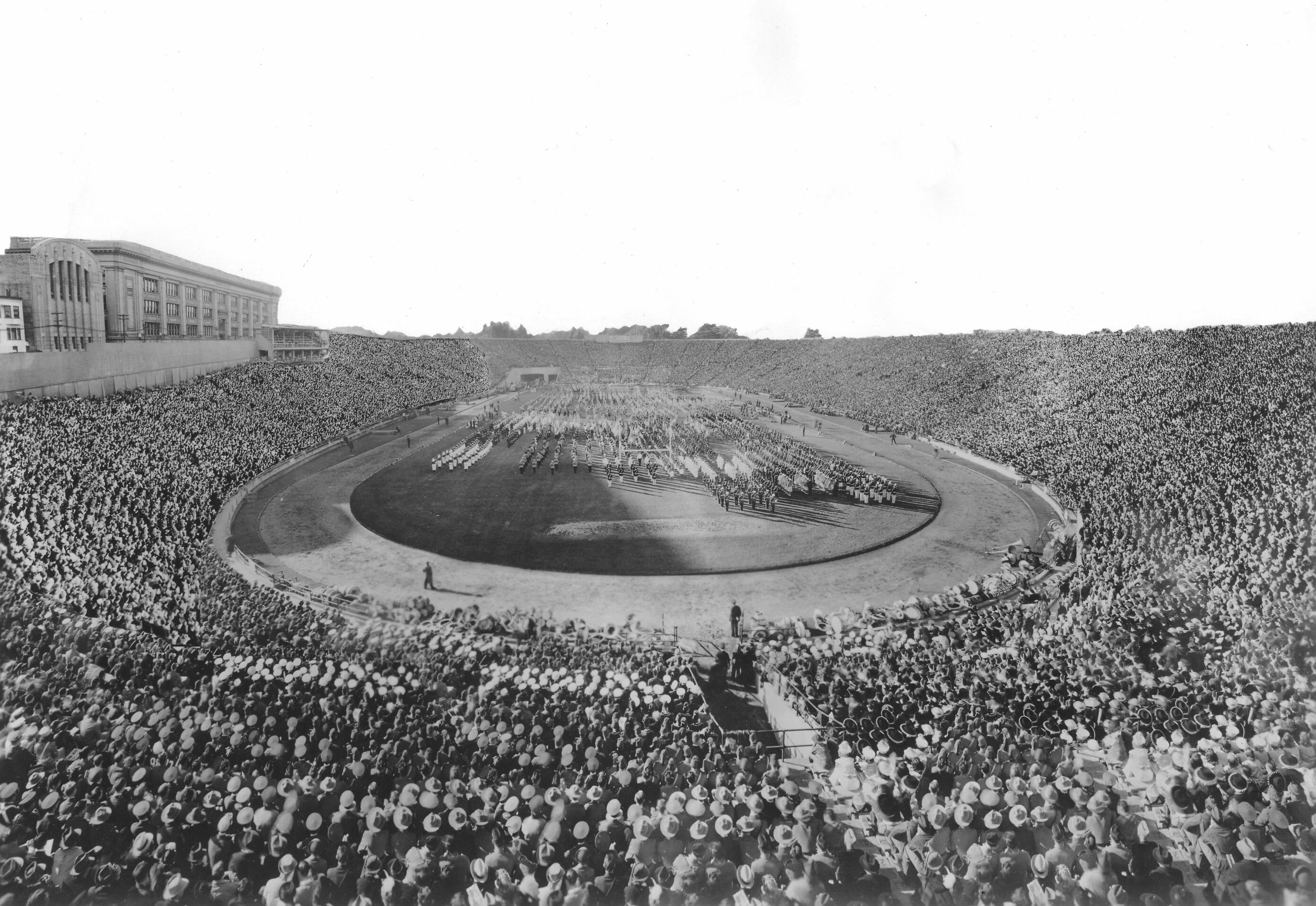
Kezar Stadium was the home of the San Francisco 49ers for two decades.

During the Great Depression, the San Francisco Parks and Recreation Department ran out of public funds. Thus, the duties of the department were transferred to the Works Progress Administration (WPA), a government program designed to provide employment and community improvements during the economic woes of the 1930s. Within the park, the WPA was responsible for the creation of several features, including the Arboretum, the archery field, and the model yacht club. The WPA reconstructed 13 miles of roads throughout the park and built the San Francisco Police Department's horse stables.

Another WPA contribution, Anglers Lodge and the adjoining fly casting pools, is still in use today. It is home to the Golden Gate Angling & Casting Club, formerly known as the San Francisco Fly Casting Club. The horseshoe pits were also created by WPA employees. The pits also came with two sculptures, one of a gentleman tossing a horse shoe and one of a white horse (which has since crumbled), both created by artist Jesse S. "Vet" Anderson.

Most of the water used for landscape watering and for various water features is now provided by groundwater from the city's Westside Basin Aquifer. In the 1950s, the use of this effluent during cold weather caused some consternation, with the introduction of artificial detergents but before the advent of modern biodegradable products. These "hard" detergents would cause long-lasting billowing piles of foam to form on the creeks connecting the artificial lakes and could even be blown onto the roads, forming a traffic hazard.

=== Summer of Love ===
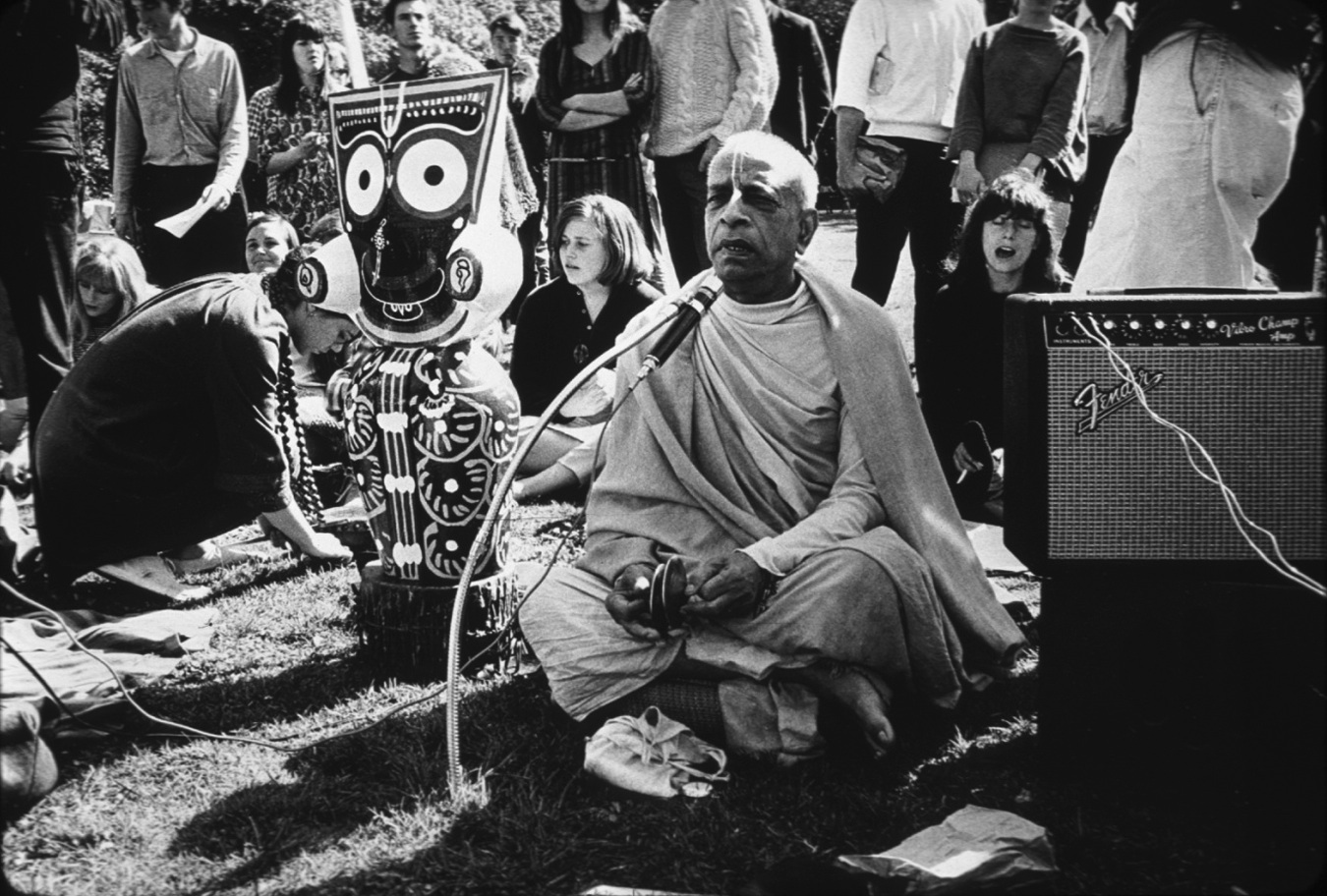
Hare Krishna leader Bhaktivedanta Swami in Golden Gate Park, 1967.

Golden Gate Park is recognized as the birthplace of the Summer of Love. On January 14, 1967, the Human Be-In was held in the Polo Fields. Organized by artist Michael Bowen, the event was attended by almost 30,000 people. Famous artists including the poets Gary Snyder and Allen Ginsberg were in attendance, as calls for alternative lifestyles and expanded consciousness reflected the countercultural attitudes of the period. At the event, psychologist Timothy Leary coined the phrase "Turn on, tune in, drop out."

Several months later, Scott McKenzie's "San Francisco (Be Sure to Wear Flowers in Your Hair)" became an anthem for the Summer of Love. The eastern end of the Park was the epicenter of the Summer of Love, with an estimated 100,000 youth visiting the Haight-Ashbury district, where they embraced communal living and counter-establishment values. Hippie Hill was a central meeting place, and renowned artists like Janis Joplin, the Grateful Dead, Jefferson Airplane, and George Harrison performed free concerts there during the Summer of Love.

=== Recent history ===
In 1983, Queen Elizabeth II visited Golden Gate Park during a tour of the West Coast. Her stop included a dinner at the De Young Museum, attended by then-President Ronald Reagan, Willie Mays, George Lucas, Joe DiMaggio, and Steve Jobs. About three blocks away from the museum, 5,000 people protested the Queen's visit due to Britain's role in The Troubles in Northern Ireland. In 2023, the FBI revealed an assassination plot against the Queen during her visit.

Today, Golden Gate Park is one of San Francisco's core attractions, drawing more than 24 million visitors each year. It hosts several annual music and arts festivals, including Outside Lands and Hardly Strictly Bluegrass. Notable Outside Lands headliners have included Radiohead, Paul McCartney, Kendrick Lamar, Elton John, The Weeknd, Billie Eilish, Tyler, the Creator, and SZA. The San Francisco Chronicle has credited the festival for "transforming Golden Gate Park into a world class music venue."

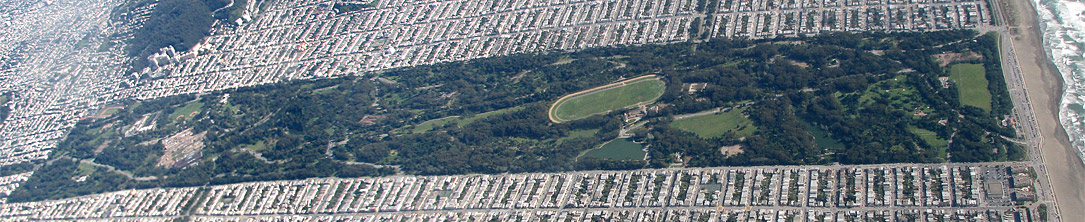
An aerial panoramic view, looking south, of Golden Gate Park

View of Conservatory of Flowers and JFK Promenade

==== JFK Promenade ====
Following the COVID-19 pandemic, the Park became an epicenter of debate on which public city spaces should be made permanent car-free zones. In 2022, the Board of Supervisors voted 7–4 to keep the eastern section of John F. Kennedy Drive permanently car-free, a decision affirmed later that year by voters through a ballot initiative 65%-35%. The section was subsequently renamed "JFK Promenade." Installations along the promenade have included a 25-ft tall dragon, a whale sculpture, murals, pianos, spaces for live music, a summer beer garden, games, benches and chairs, and a light show on the Conservatory of Flowers.

== Music Concourse area ==
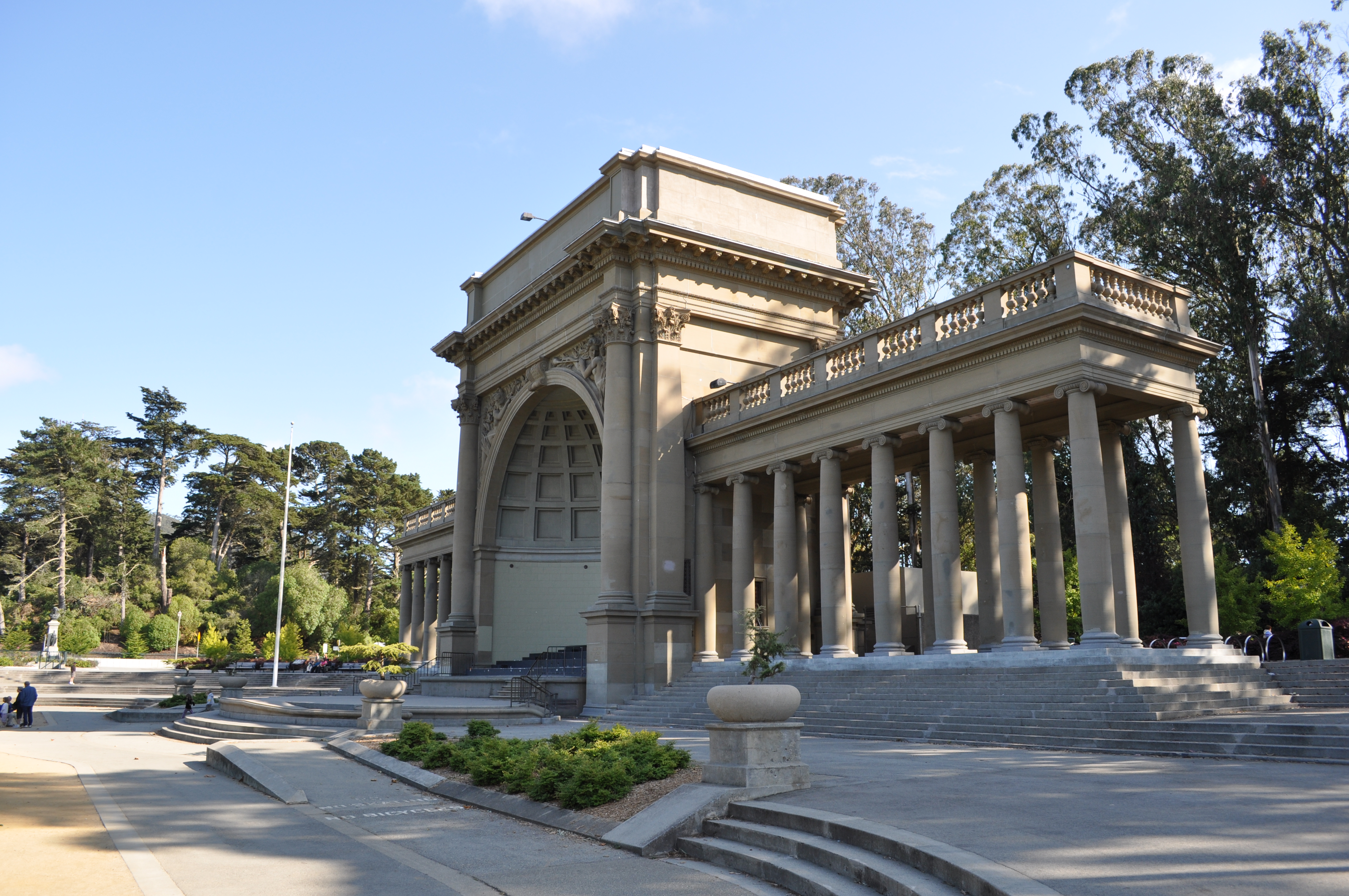
Spreckels Temple of Music on the Music Concourse

The Music Concourse is a sunken, oval-shaped open-air plaza originally excavated for the California Midwinter International Exposition of 1894. Its focal point is the Spreckels Temple of Music, also called the "Bandshell", where numerous music performances have been staged. During the fall, spring, and summer seasons, various food trucks are often parked behind the Bandshell, providing local food options to visitors of the Music Concourse. Parkwide bicycle and surrey rentals are also available behind the bandshell and at Haight and Stanyan on the east edge of Golden Gate Park. The area also includes a number of statues of various historic figures, four fountains, and a regular grid array of heavily pollarded trees. Since 2003, the Music Concourse has undergone a series of improvements to include an underground 800-car parking garage and pedestrianization of the plaza itself. It is surrounded by various cultural attractions, including:

=== De Young Museum ===
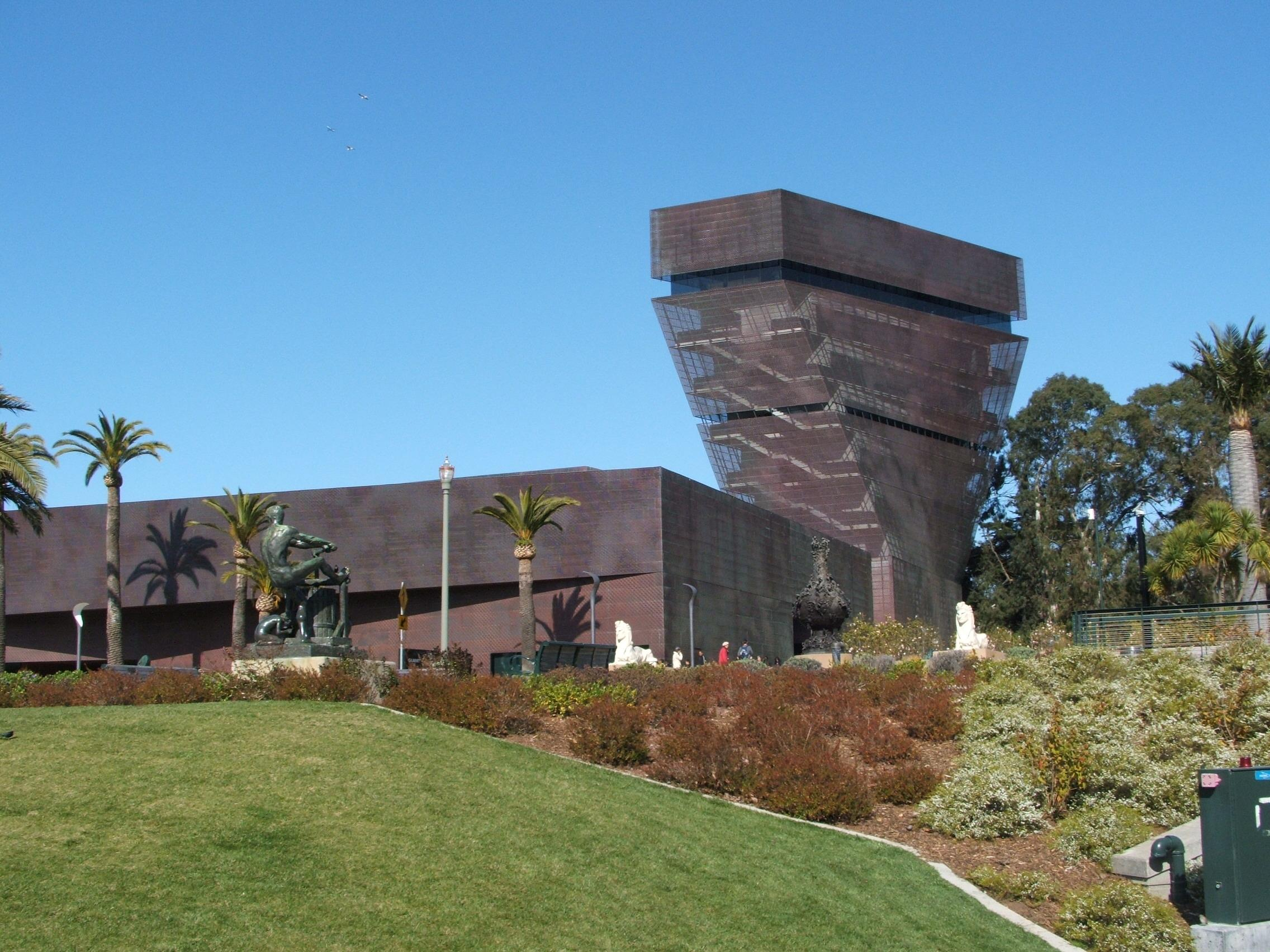
The new M. H. de Young Memorial Museum opened in 2005.

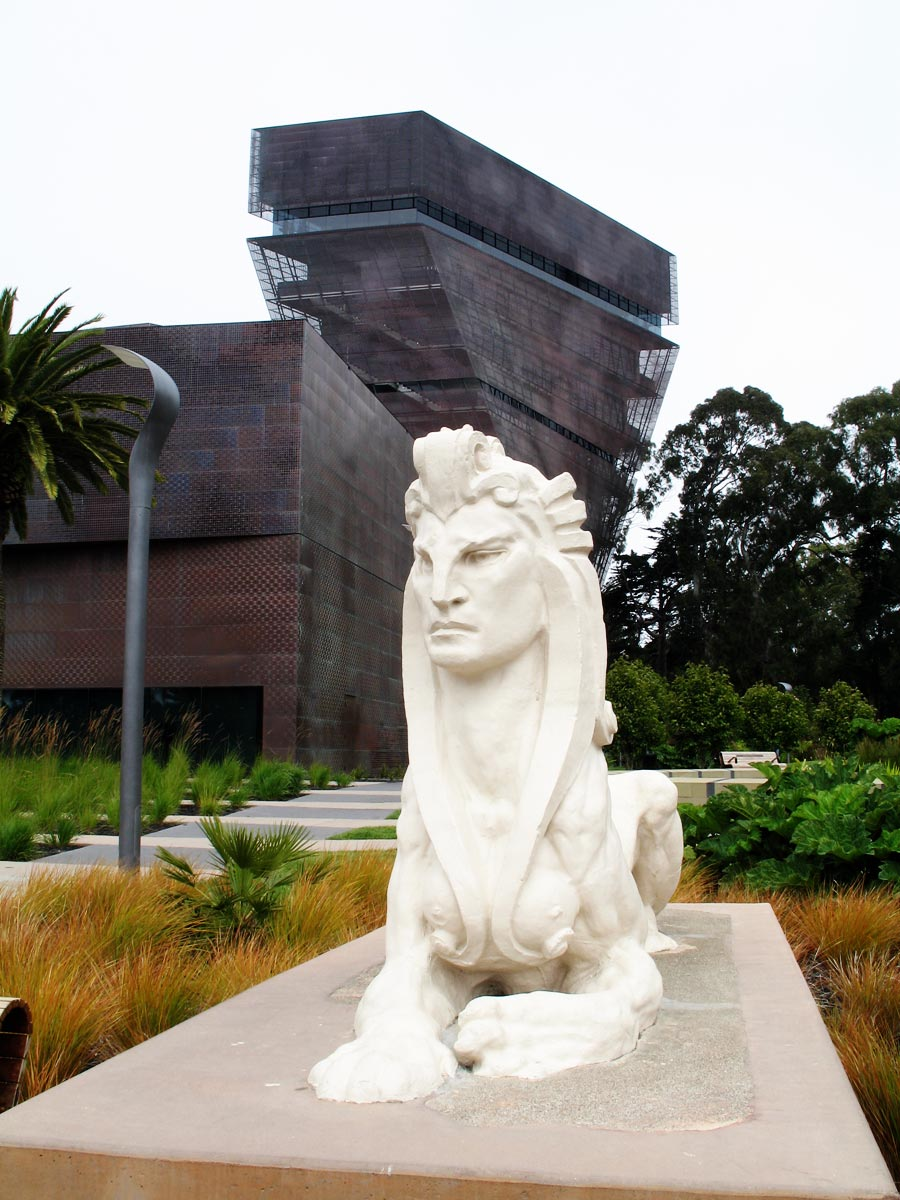
The sphinx outside the De Young

Named after M. H. de Young, the San Francisco newspaper magnate, the De Young Museum is a fine arts museum that was opened in January 1921. Its original building, the Fine Arts Building, was part of the 1894 Midwinter Exposition, of which Mr. de Young was the director. The Fine Arts Building featured several artists, twenty-eight of whom were female. One of these revolutionaries was Helen Hyde, who is featured in the De Young Museum today. Once the fair ended, the Egyptian-styled building remained open "brimful and running over with art." Most of these pieces were paintings and sculptures purchased by De Young himself, and others were donations of household antiques from the older community, which were "more sentimental than artistic." By 1916, the Fine Arts Building's collection had grown to 1,000,000 items, and a more suitable museum was necessary.

Construction to build a new museum began in 1917. With funds donated by De Young, and Louis Mullgardt as head architect, the De Young Museum was completed in 1921 in a "sixteenth century Spanish Renaissance design, with pale salmon colored façades that were burdened with rococo ornamentation." At its center was a 134-foot tower from which its wings extended. At the entrance was the Pool of Enchantment, which consisted of the sculptured Indian boys created by M. Earl Cummings. The museum contained four wings: the East Wing (featuring ever-changing paintings, sculptures and photography by artists such as Vincent Van Gogh); the Central Wing (famous American and European work); the Northeast wing (Asian collections); and the West Wing (artistic history of San Francisco).

The original De Young Memorial Museum stood for most of the twentieth century, until 2001 when it was completely rebuilt, reopening in 2005. The head-architects, Jacques Herzog and Pierre de Meuron, when asked about their design, said they wanted to create a place "where the art would be less hierarchically presented – more like contemporary art than like bijoux." The building is mostly constructed of copper, and its unique design was created with the idea that the "building would be enhanced not only by sunlight but also by San Francisco's constant fog." Since the opening of the De Young in 1921, its galleries have mostly changed, but some of the art originally featured during the fair and in the early twentieth century still exists in the museum today. The galleries of Asian art have since been relocated, but the De Young still features American art, Modern art, African art, textiles and sculptures, and special alternating exhibitions.

=== Academy of Sciences ===
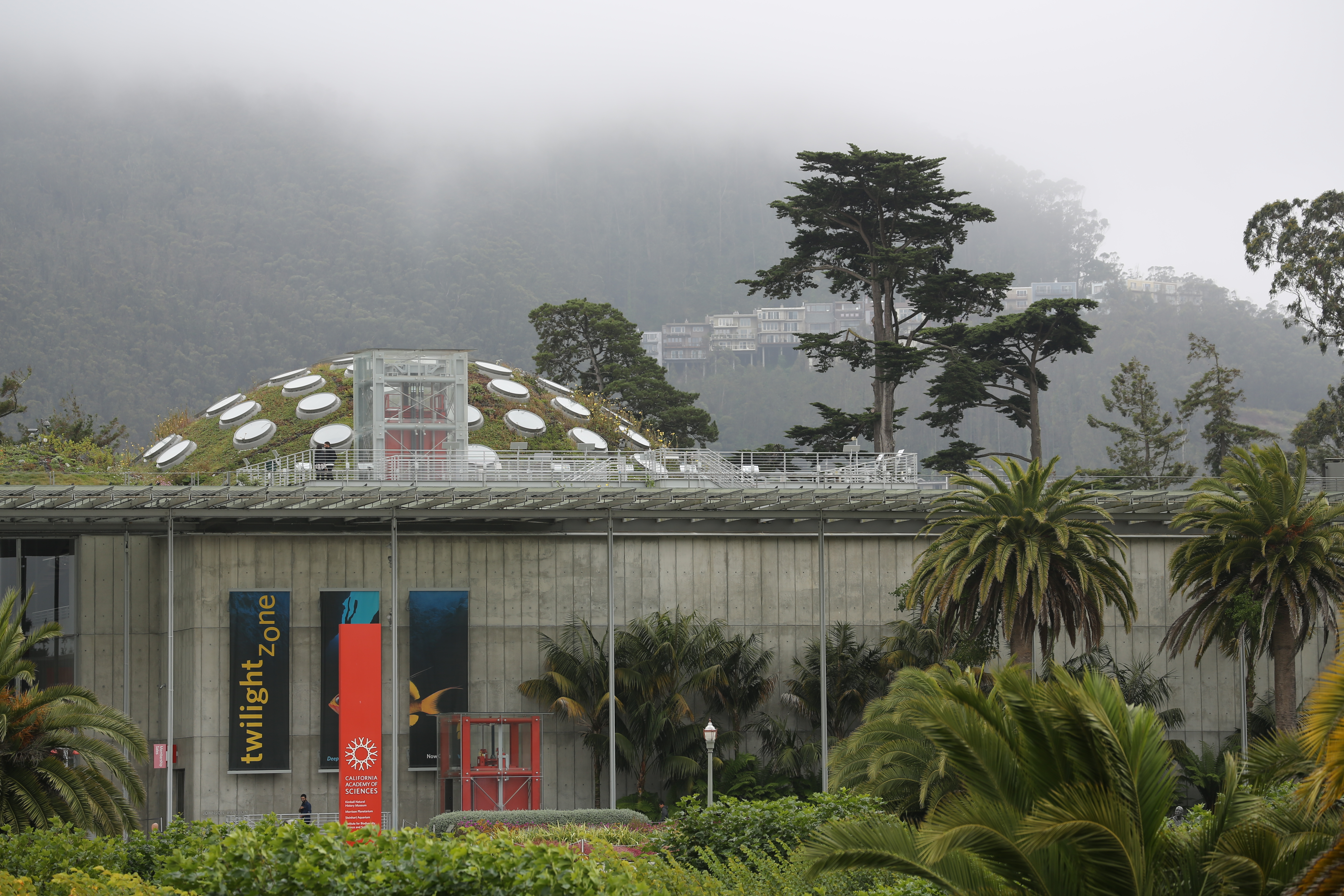
The California Academy of Sciences

The California Academy of Sciences was founded in 1853, just three years after California was made a state, making it the oldest scientific institution in the western United States. Evolutionist Charles Darwin corresponded on the initial organization of the early institution. The original museum consisted of eleven buildings built between 1916 and 1976 located on the former site of the 1894 Midwinter Fair's Mechanical Arts Building in Golden Gate Park. The structure was largely destroyed in the 1989 earthquake and just three of the original buildings were conserved for the new construction: the African Hall, the North American Hall, and the Steinhart Aquarium. The new building opened in 2008 at the same location in the park. The present building encompasses 37,000 square meters and includes exhibits of natural history, aquatic life, astronomy, gems and minerals, and earthquakes.

The academy also contains a 2.5-acre living roof with almost 1.7 million native California plants and domes that cover the planetarium and rainforest exhibitions. The soil of the roof is six inches deep, which reduces storm water runoff by more than 90% and naturally cools the interior of the museum, thereby reducing the need for air-conditioning. The glass panels of the living roof also contain cells that collect more than 5% of the electricity needed to power the museum. Due to its eco-friendly materials and natural sources of energy, the California Academy of Sciences has been named the country's only LEED-platinum certified museum, granted by the U.S. Green Building Council.

=== Japanese Tea Garden ===
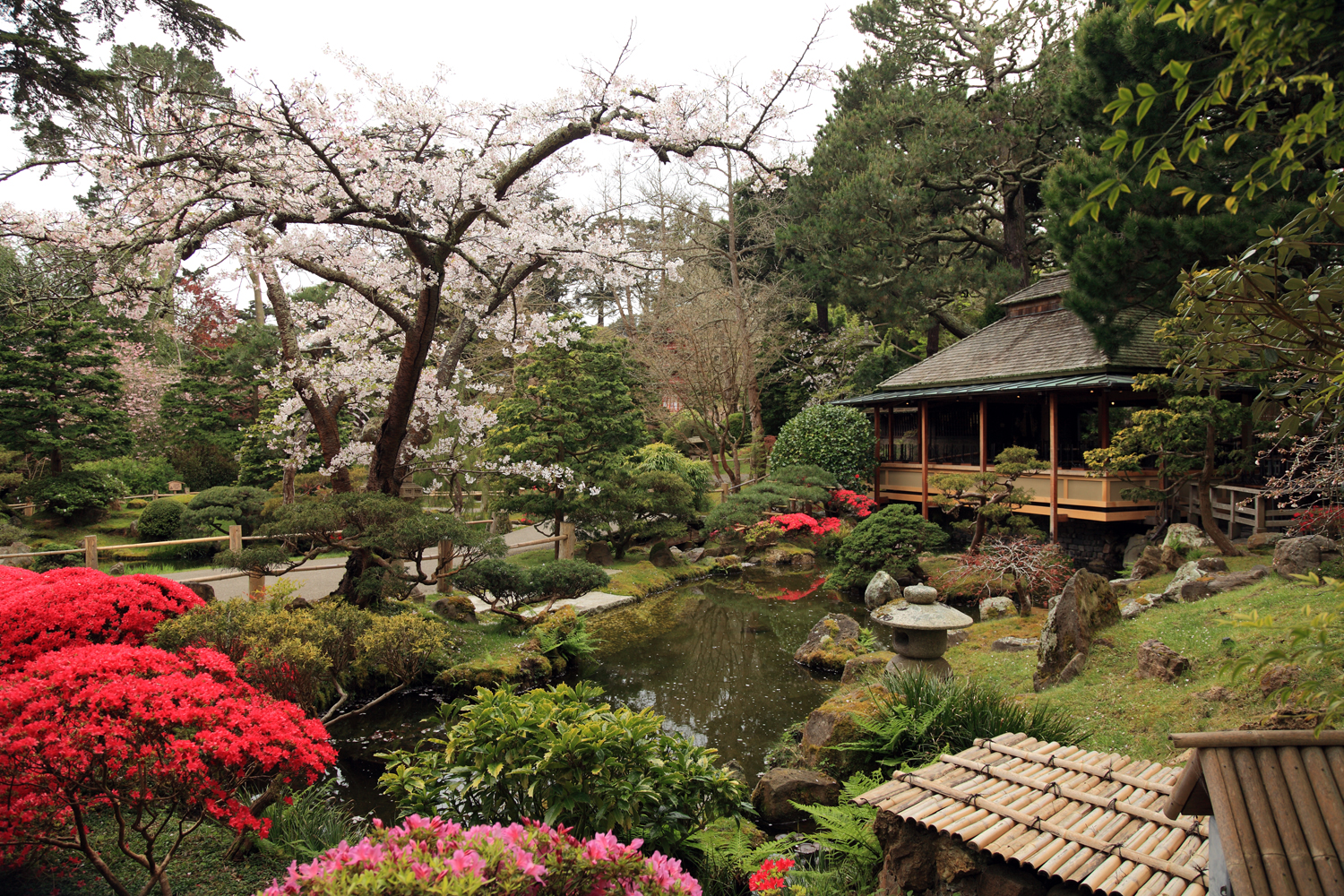
The Japanese Tea Garden opened in 1894.

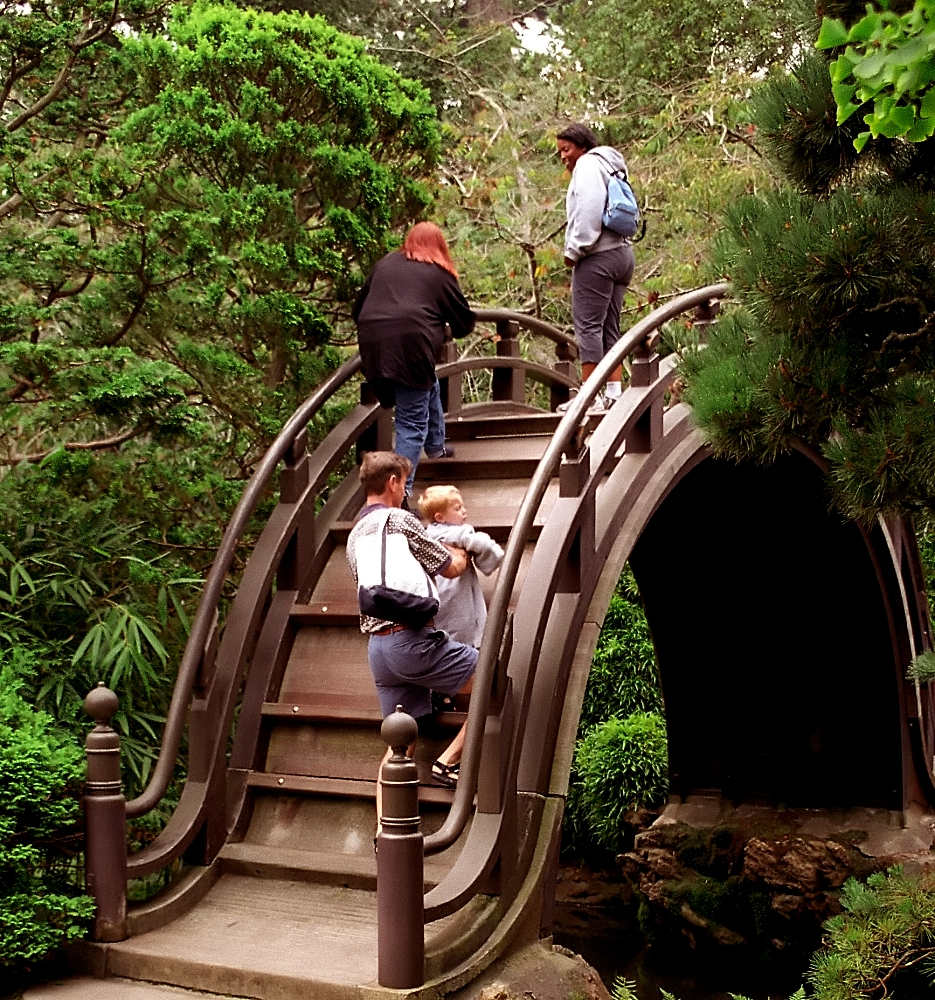
Moon bridge at the Japanese Tea Garden

The Japanese Tea Garden is the oldest public Japanese garden in the United States and occupies five of the 1,017 acres (412 ha) of the Golden Gate Park. It stands adjacent to the de Young Museum and is rumored to be the introduction site of the fortune cookie to America.

George Turner Marsh, an Australian immigrant, originally created the garden as a "Japanese Village" exhibit for the 1894 Midwinter Exposition. Following the fair, a handshake agreement with John McLaren would allow Japanese horticulturalist Makoto Hagiwara to take over the garden. Hagiwara would oversee modifications in the garden's transition from a temporary exhibit to a permanent installment within the park. Hagiwara and his family would continue to occupy the garden, maintaining the landscape and design of the garden until 1942.

Hagiwara himself died in 1925, leaving the garden in the hands of his daughter, Takano Hagiwara, and her children. They lived there until 1942, when they were evicted from the gardens and forced into internment camps by way of Executive Order 9066. During World War II, anti-Japanese sentiment led to the renaming of the garden as the "Oriental Tea Garden". After the war, a letter-writing campaign enabled the garden to be formally reinstated as the Japanese Tea Garden in 1952. In January 1953, "a classical Zen garden was added to the Tea Garden" as well as the Lantern of Peace. The Lantern of Peace, weighing 9,000 pounds, was a gift from the Japanese Government as a way to mend the relationship between the U.S. and Japan that was damaged from World War II. In addition, a plaque, designed by Ruth Asawa, now stands at the entrance of the gardens as a tribute meant to honor Hagiwara and his family for their care-taking of the gardens. The garden also still has features such as the Drum Bridge and the Tea House from the Midwinter Exposition.

As is typical among Japanese style tea gardens, the Golden Gate Park's tea garden has its own stepping stone pathways, stone lanterns, and variety of plants. In the mix there are dwarf trees, bamboo, and azaleas adorning the gardens.

The Japanese Tea Garden serves as a spot of tranquility in the middle of the various activities that take place at the Golden Gate Park and provides visitors "a place in which it is possible to be at one with nature, its rhythms, and changing beauties." The Japanese Tea Garden brings in more than $1 million to the Golden Gate Park and the city annually. There is a constant debate whether or not changes should be made to the garden. Adding souvenir shops and a diversity of food options at the garden historically brings in more money to the organization monitoring the Golden Gate Park, the Recreation and Park Commission. Selling products that share knowledge about Japanese gardens and culture also helps maintain the Japanese Tea Garden's authenticity.

== Structures and buildings ==
=== Conservatory of Flowers ===
==== History ====
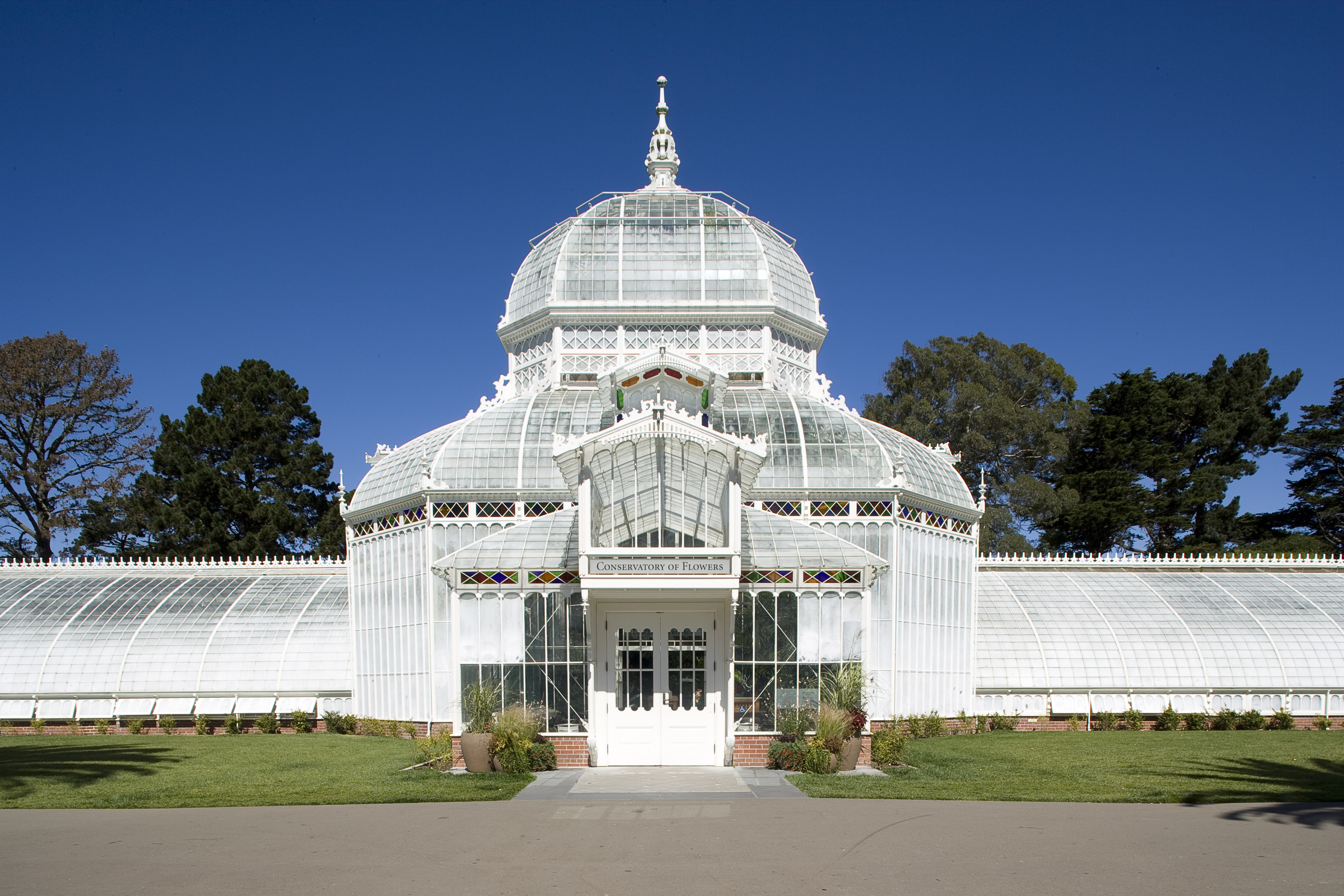
The Conservatory of Flowers opened in 1879.

The Conservatory of Flowers opened in 1879 and stands today as the oldest building in Golden Gate Park. The Conservatory of Flowers is one of the largest conservatories in the US, as well as one of few large Victorian greenhouses in the United States. Built of traditional wood and glass panes, the Conservatory stands at 12,000 square feet and houses 1,700 species of tropical, rare and aquatic plants. Though it was not originally constructed, William Hammond Hall included the idea of a conservatory in his original concept for the design of the park. The idea was later realized with the help of twenty-seven of the wealthiest business owners in San Francisco.

In 1883, a boiler exploded and the main dome caught fire. A restoration was undertaken by Southern Pacific magnate Charles Crocker. It survived the earthquake of 1906, only to suffer another fire in 1918. In 1933 it was declared unsound and closed to the public, only to be reopened in 1946. In 1995, after a severe storm with 100 mph (161 km/h) winds damaged the structure, shattering 40% of the glass, the conservatory was closed again. It was cautiously dissected for repairs and reopened in September 2003.

==== Rooms within the Conservatory ====
- The Potted Plants Gallery follows Victorian architecture and the 19th century idea of displaying tropical plants in non-tropical parts of the world.
- The Lowlands Gallery contains plants from the tropics of South America (near the equator).
- The Highlands Gallery contains native plants from South to Central America.
- The Aquatic Plants room is similar in conditions as those near the Amazon River.

=== Beach Chalet ===
The two-story Beach Chalet faces the Great Highway and Ocean Beach at the far western end of the park. It contains two restaurants and murals from the 1930s.

=== Windmills ===
North Windmill in Golden Gate Park

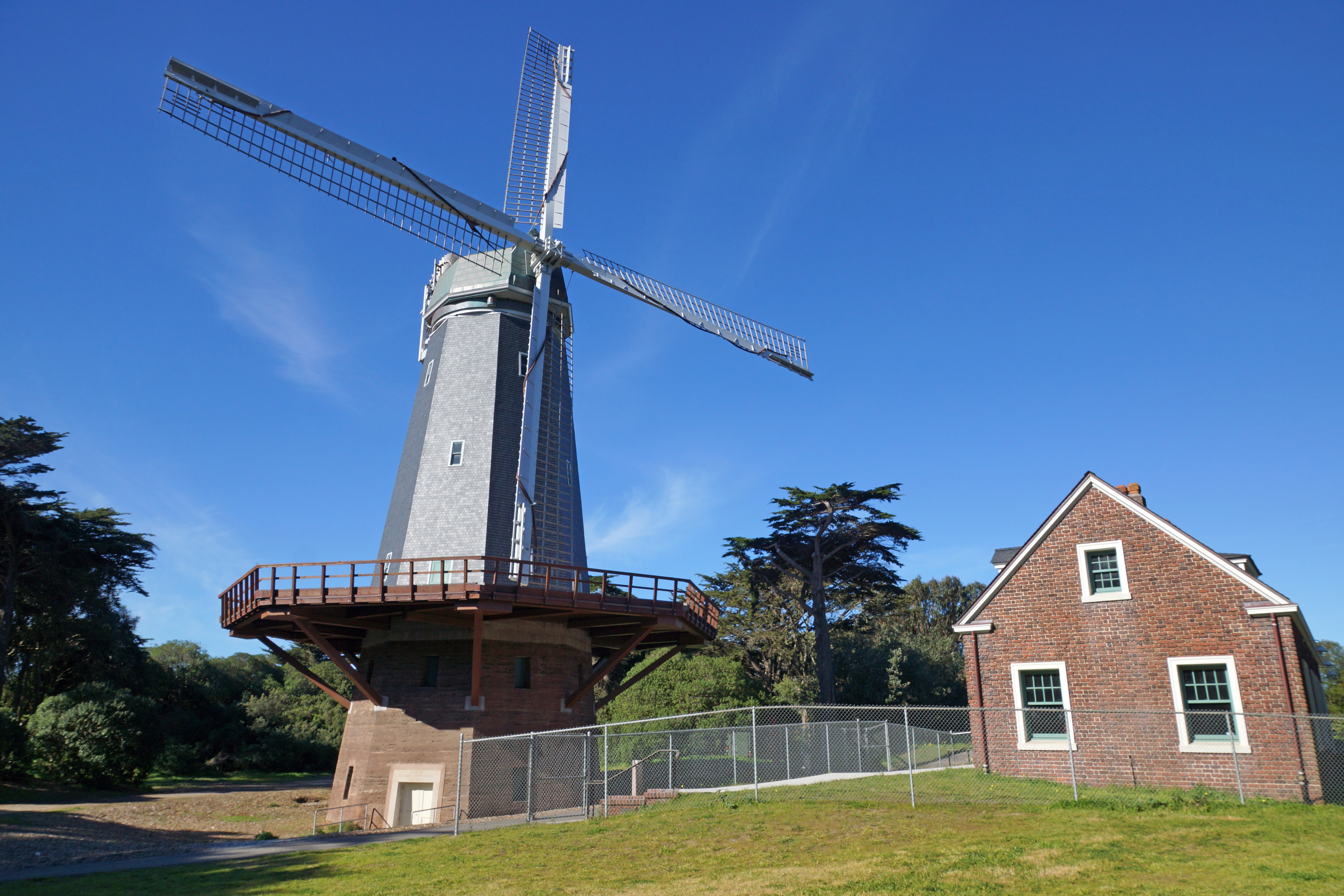
The South Windmill

Before the construction of its windmills, Golden Gate Park paid the Spring Valley Water Works up to 40 cents per 1000 gallons of water. To avoid this expense the North (Dutch) Windmill was commissioned in 1902 when Superintendent John McLaren deemed the park's pumping plant insufficient to supply the additional water essential to the life of the park. A survey and inspection of the vast area west of Strawberry Hill revealed a large flow of water toward the ocean. The North windmill was constructed to reclaim the drainage towards the Pacific Ocean and direct fresh well water back into the park. Alpheus Bull Jr., a prominent San Franciscan, designed the North Windmill. The Fulton Engineering Company received the bid for the ironwork, and Pope and Talbot Lumber Company donated sails ("spars") of Oregon pine. The North Windmill was installed, standing 75 feet tall with 102-footlong sails. The windmill pumps water an elevation of 200 feet with a capacity of 30,000 gallons of water per pump per hour, supplying and replenishing Lloyd Lake, Metson Lake, Spreckels Lake, and Lincoln Park. The water is pumped from the valley into a reservoir on Strawberry Hill. From there the water runs downhill into Falls and Blue Heron Lake. The North Windmill was successful, causing another system of wells and a second windmill at the southwestern corner of the park to be recommended. Samuel G. Murphy provided $20,000 to erect the windmill. The South Windmill (Murphy Windmill) stands as the largest in the world, having the longest sails in the world since its construction, with the ability to lift 40,000 gallons of water per hour.

=== Sculpture ===
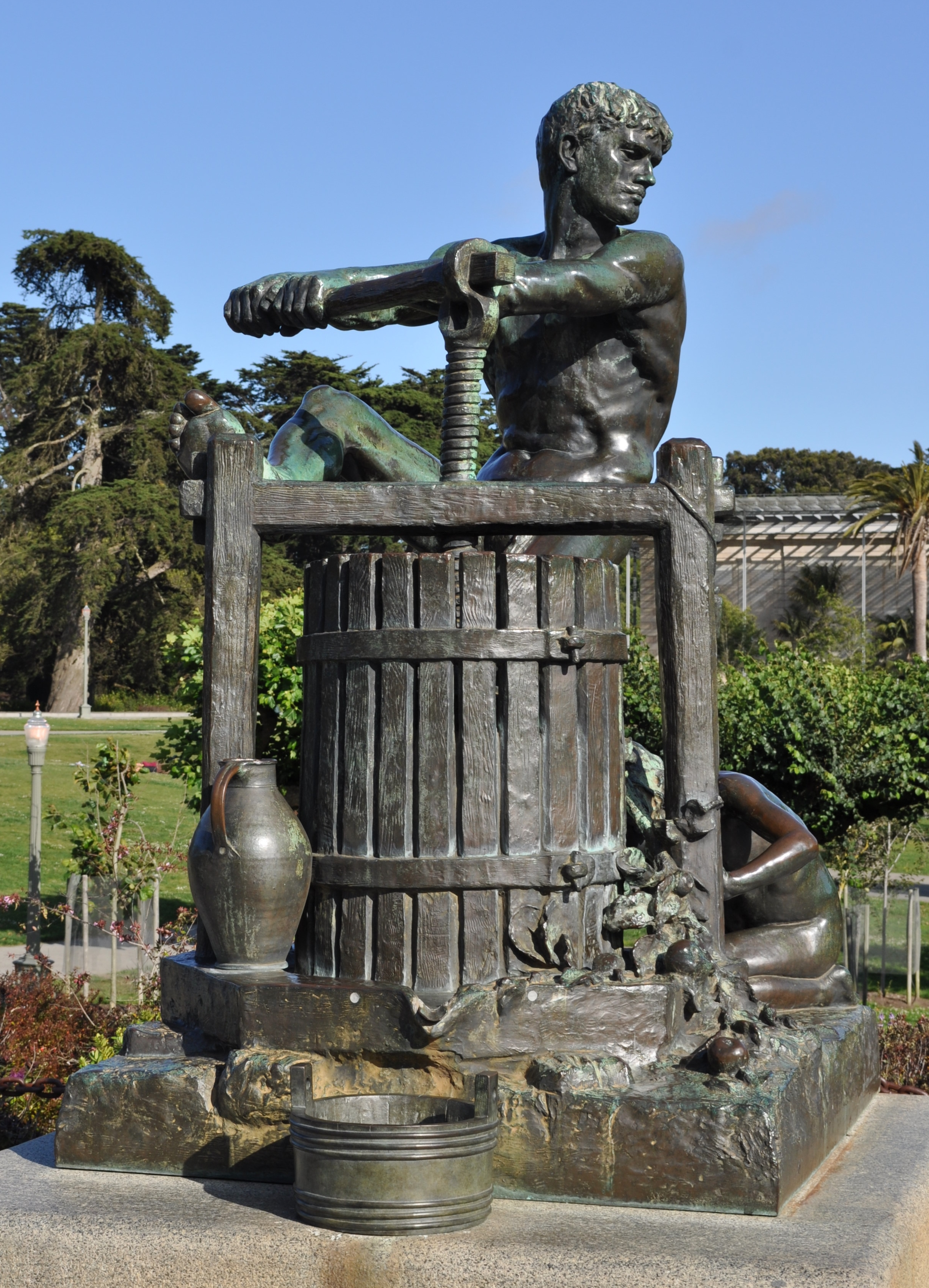
The Cider Press is a sculpture by Thomas Shields Clarke, installed in Golden Gate Park.

A statue of longtime park superintendent John McLaren stands in the Rhododendron Dell. McLaren had this statue hidden and it was only placed in the dell after his death. Other statues of historical figures are also located throughout the park, including Francis Scott Key, Robert Emmet, Robert Burns, the double monument to Johann Goethe and Friedrich Schiller, General Pershing, Beethoven, Giuseppe Verdi, President Garfield, and Thomas Starr King. A bronze statue of Don Quixote and his companion, Sancho Panza kneeling to honor their creator, Cervantes, combines historical and fictitious characters. At the Horseshoe Court in the northeast corner of the park near Fulton and Stanyan, there is a concrete bas-relief of The Horseshoe Pitcher by Jesse "Vet" Anderson, a member of the Horseshoe Club. Across from the Conservatory of Flowers is Douglas Tilden's The Baseball Player.

During the George Floyd protests, on June 19, 2020, vandals toppled or otherwise defaced the statues of Catholic missionary Junípero Serra, Francis Scott Key (author of the lyrics to The Star-Spangled Banner), Ulysses S. Grant, Cervantes, Don Quixote and Sancho Panza. The archbishop of San Francisco, Salvatore Cordileone, described the toppling of the saint's statue as "an act of sacrilege [and] an act of the evil one", and on June 27 performed an exorcism at the site using the Prayer to Saint Michael.

In the northwest corner of the park, near the Beach Chalet, was a monument to explorer Roald Amundsen and the Gjøa, the first vessel to transit the Northwest Passage. Following the expedition, Gjøa was donated to the city in 1906 and put on display for decades near Ocean Beach. After falling into disrepair, Gjøa was returned to Norway in 1972.

In July 2025, a metal sea serpent sculpture, named Naga, was erected as an art installation on JFK Promenade. The sculpture is 100 feet long and 25 feet wide, and it was originally created for Burning Man 2024.

=== Prayer Book Cross ===
The Prayer Book Cross, also known as Drake's Cross, is a sandstone Celtic-style cross measuring 60 feet tall. Erected by Episcopalians in 1894, it commemorates Sir Francis Drake's first landing on the West Coast in 1579, the first use of the Book of Common Prayer in California and (from the inscription) the "First Christian service in the English tongue on our coast." It is located near Rainbow Falls on Crossover Drive between the John F. Kennedy Promenade and Park Presidio Drive. The cross was meant to be visible to ships at sea but has since been overgrown by trees. A gift of George W. Childs, it was designed by the architectural firm Coxhead & Coxhead of San Francisco.

=== Carousel ===
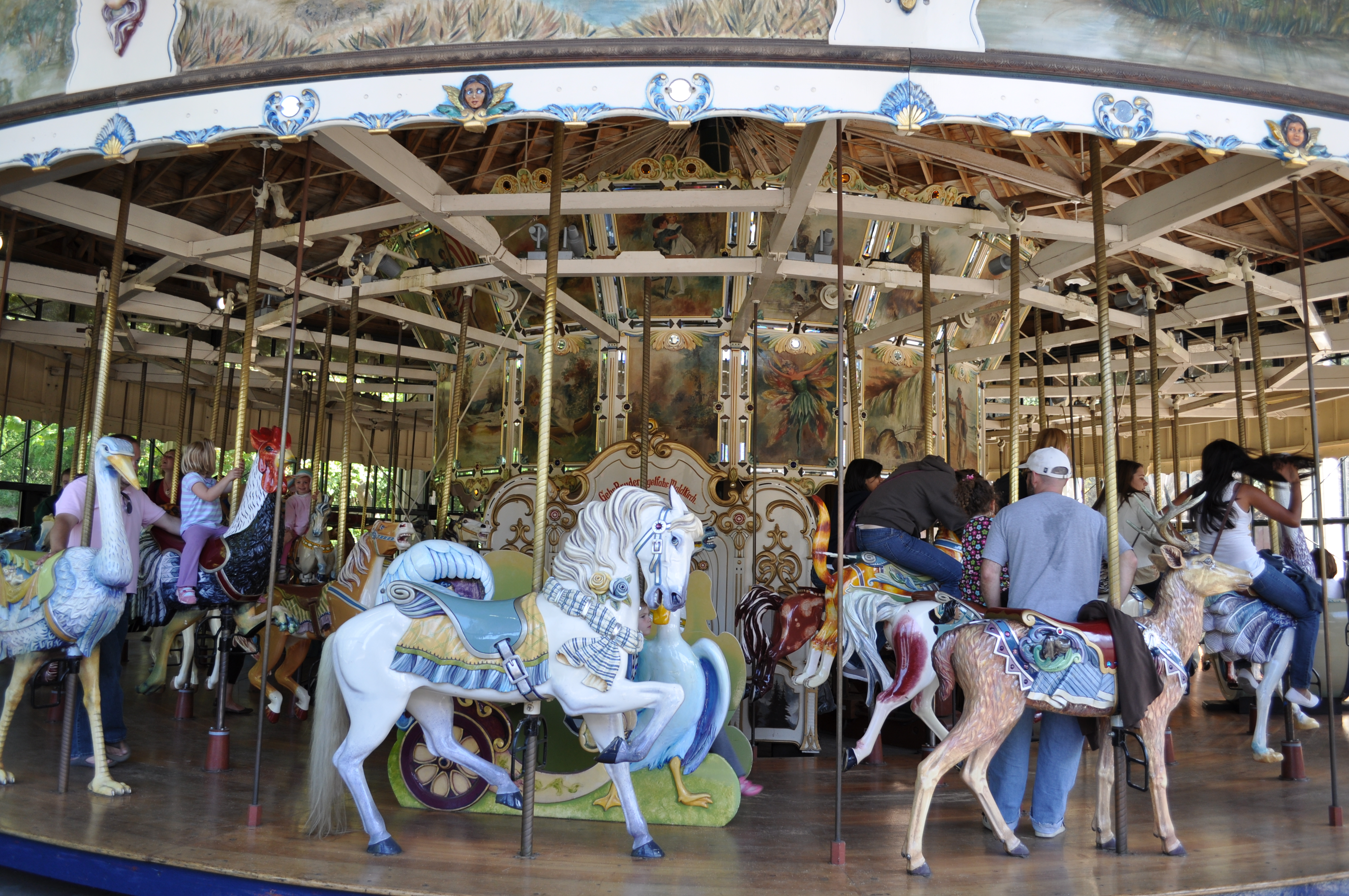
The carousel building in Golden Gate Park

William Hammond Hall persuaded officials to build the Children's House and Play Ground, designed by Percy & Hamilton, finished in 1888, and funded by William Sharon's bequest. It was the first public children's playground in the United States, for children and their mothers, offering swings, indoor enclosures, open sitting areas and a steam-powered carousel. The two-story Sharon Children's House now houses the Sharon Art Studio.

In 1888, a steam-powered carousel was installed in a circular building near the Children's House and Play Ground. The carousel building was occupied by two more carousels before the 1914 Herschell-Spillman Company carousel was purchased by Herbert Fleishhacker from the Golden Gate International Exposition in 1941. The 1914 carousel has undergone several major renovations, the first, a transition from steam to electric power with the assistance of the PG&E Company.

In 1977, the carousel closed for safety concerns and The San Francisco Arts Commission hired local artist Ruby Newman to oversee the artistic restoration. Her crew of craftspeople restored the badly deteriorated carousel and hand painted all animals, chariots, painted landscapes of the bay area and decorative housing (she holds the copyright), re-opening in 1984. Presently, the carousel includes sixty two animals, and a German Band Organ. Two of the animals, a goat and an Outside Row Stander Carousel Horse, are by the Dentzel Wooden Carousel Company.

In 2007, the Koret Foundation funded a $3.8 million renovation, later called the Koret Playground/Children's Quarter.

== Transportation ==
=== Public transport ===
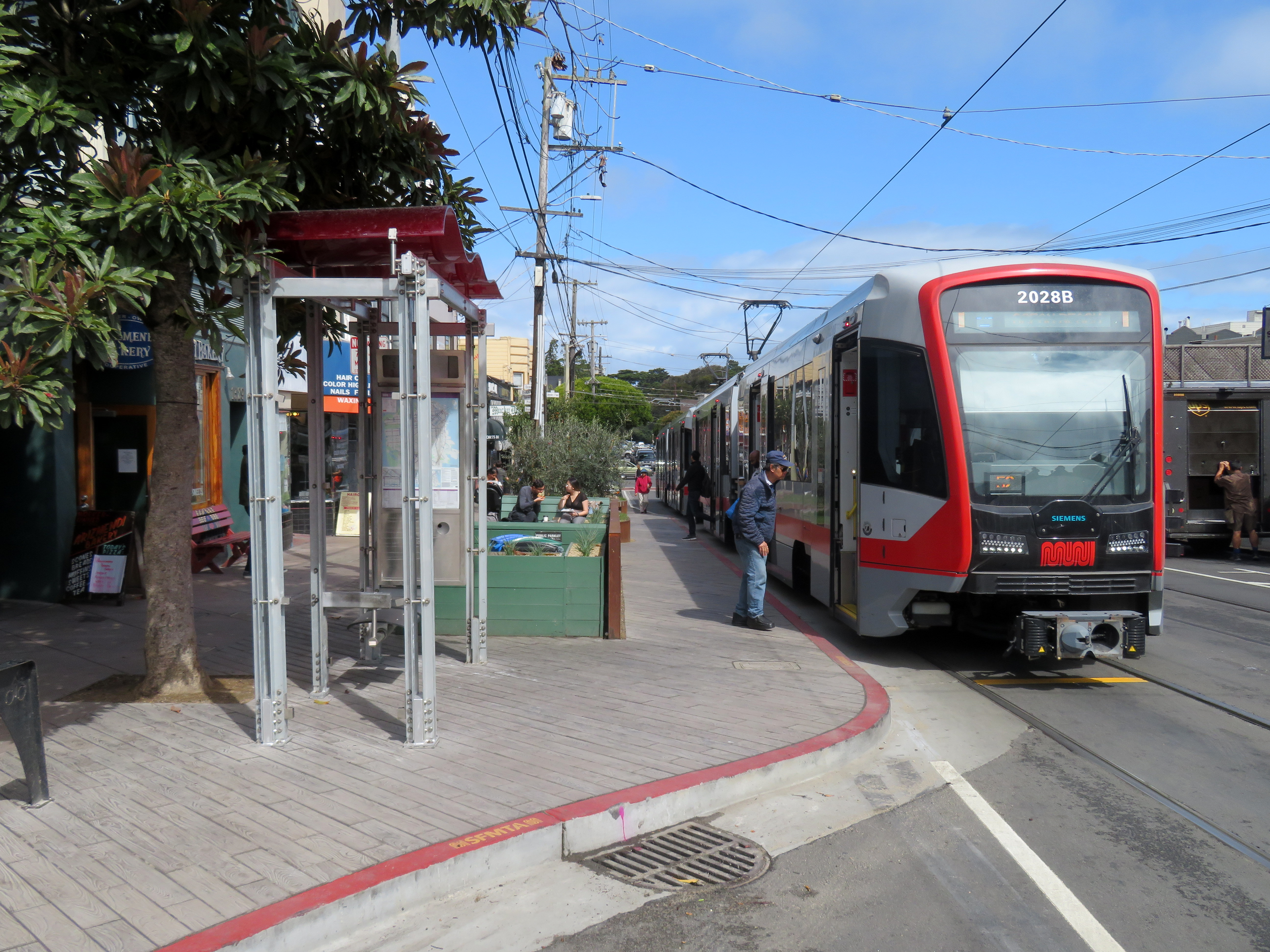
Metro stopped at the 9th Avenue and Irving station, half a mile from the California Academy of Sciences.

The San Francisco Muni Metro runs along the southern edge of the park. Access to the park on the westbound N Judah line begins at the Carl and Stanyan station, located one block from Kezar Stadium. The line continues along the entirety of the park, and includes access to the California Academy of Sciences and De Young Museum at the 9th Avenue and Irving station; Blue Heron Lake at the Judah and 19th Avenue station; Polo Fields at the Judah and Sunset station; and the Beach Chalet Soccer Fields at the line's western terminus at the Judah and La Playa station.

Various bus routes pass through Golden Gate Park or stop along its boundaries. The 18 bus stops along the Great Highway on the western end of the park. The 5 Fulton runs along the northern boundary of the park along Fulton Street. The 33 Ashbury/18th Street stops along the eastern edge of the park in Haight-Ashbury. The 7 Haight/Noriega also stops in the Haight, running about halfway along the southern end of the park. The 43 Masonic stops near the Pandhandle on the far eastern end of the park. The 44 and 28 both run through the park.

== Natural features ==
=== San Francisco Botanical Garden at Strybing Arboretum ===
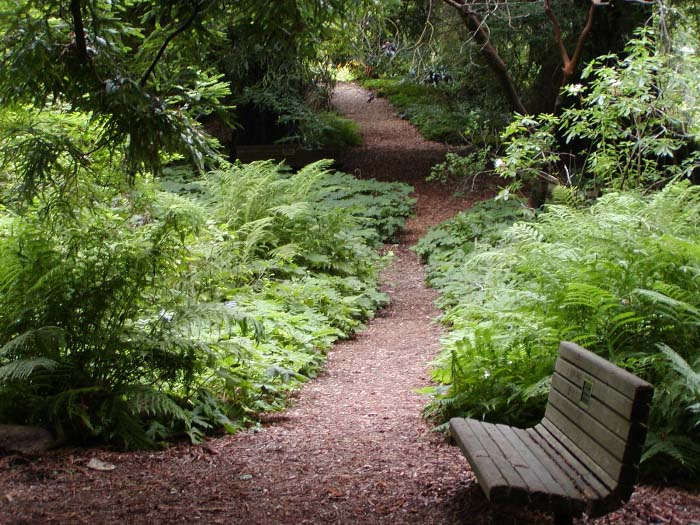
Redwood trail through the San Francisco Botanical Garden

The San Francisco Botanical Garden was laid out in the 1890s, but funding was insufficient until Helene Strybing willed funds in 1926. Planting began in 1937 with WPA funds supplemented by local donations. This 55 acres (22 ha) arboretum contains more than 7,500 plant species. The arboretum also houses the Helen Crocker Russell Library, northern California's largest horticultural library.

Due to the unique climate of San Francisco and Golden Gate Park, the plants in the San Francisco Botanical Garden range from a variety of different national origins, some of them no longer existing in their natural habitats. Areas of origin include but are not limited to Africa, Australia, New Zealand, and Central and South America. These regions of origin go from desert to tropical. In addition, some native California species are housed in the garden as well, such as Redwood trees. Overall, the tradition of these diverse gardens that eventually served to inspire the San Francisco Botanical Garden comes originally from China, Europe, and Mexico.

=== Lakes ===
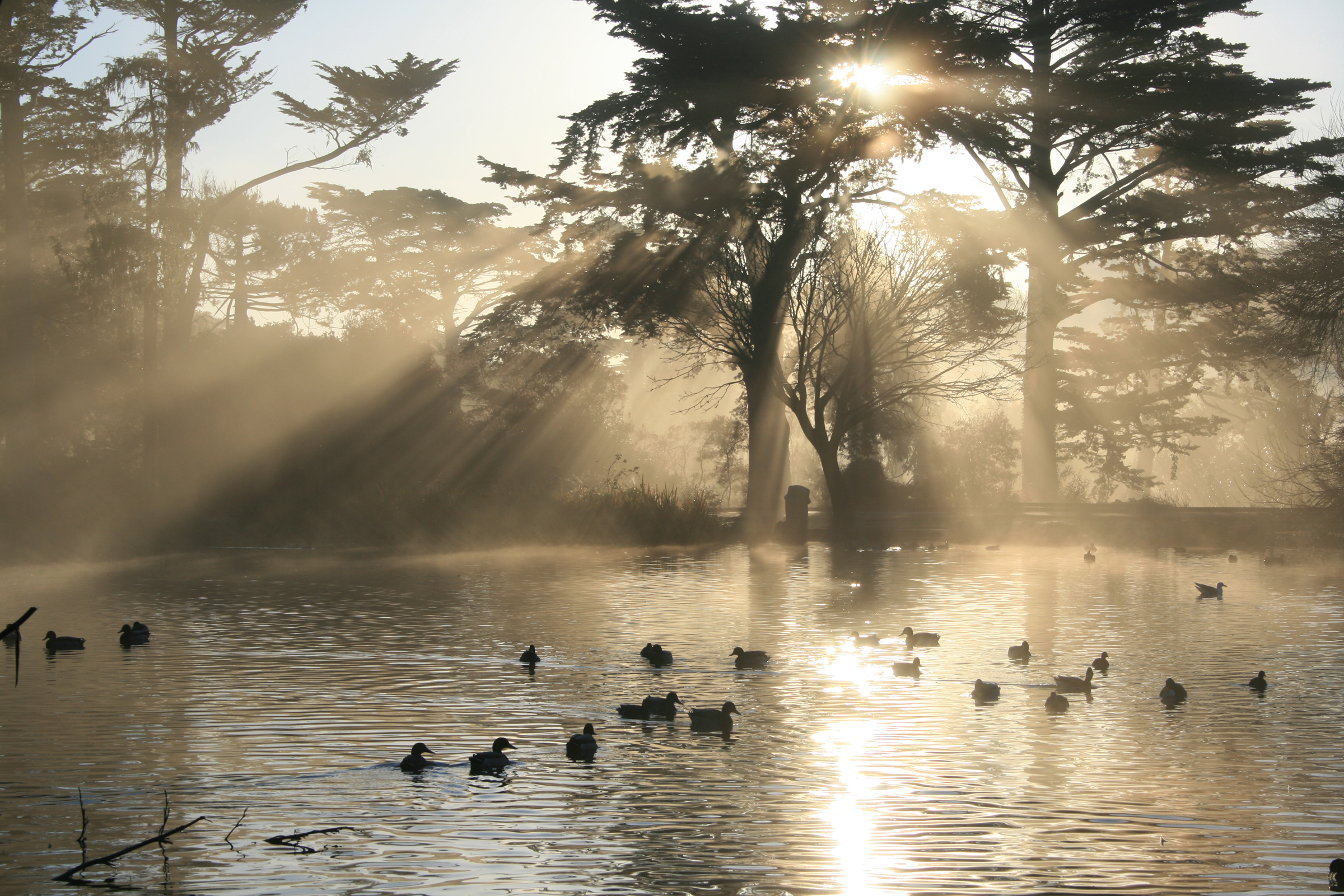
Blue Heron Lake, the largest of the manmade lakes in Golden Gate Park, offers boat rentals.

Blue Heron Lake, formerly known as Stow Lake, surrounds the prominent Strawberry Hill, now an island with an electrically pumped waterfall. The lake was originally named for William W. Stow, a known anti-Semite, who gave $60,000 for its construction. Strawberry Hills' waterfall was named Huntington Falls after its benefactor Collis P. Huntington. Blue Heron Lake was the first artificial lake constructed in the park and Huntington was the park's first artificial waterfall. The falls are fed by a reservoir located atop Strawberry Hill. Water is pumped into the reservoir from Elk Glen Lake, the South Windmill, wells, and the city's water supply to keep the system of lakes flowing eastward from Blue Heron Lake.

Rowboats and pedalboats can be rented at the boathouse. Much of the western portion of San Francisco can be seen from the top of this hill. The reservoir at its top also supplies a network of high-pressure water mains that exclusively supply specialized fire hydrants throughout the city. The lake itself also serves as a reservoir from which water is pumped to irrigate the rest of the park should other pumps stop operating.

In the past the Hill was also topped by Sweeny Observatory, but the building was ruined by the 1906 earthquake and plans to replace it were not approved by park commissioners.

Two bridges connect the inner island to the surrounding mainland: the Roman Bridge and the Stone (or Rustic) Bridge. The Stone Bridge is a prominent background feature in the 1915 American silent comedy short Wished on Mabel, starring Mabel Normand and Roscoe "Fatty" Arbuckle.

In October 2022, three San Francisco city supervisors introduced a resolution urging the Recreation and Park Commission to rename the lake due to William Stow's outspoken antisemitism, as part of an effort to rename various landmarks across the San Francisco Bay Area. In January 2024, the Commission decided on the new name of "Blue Heron Lake", in honor of the blue herons that nest along the lake.

Spreckels Lake

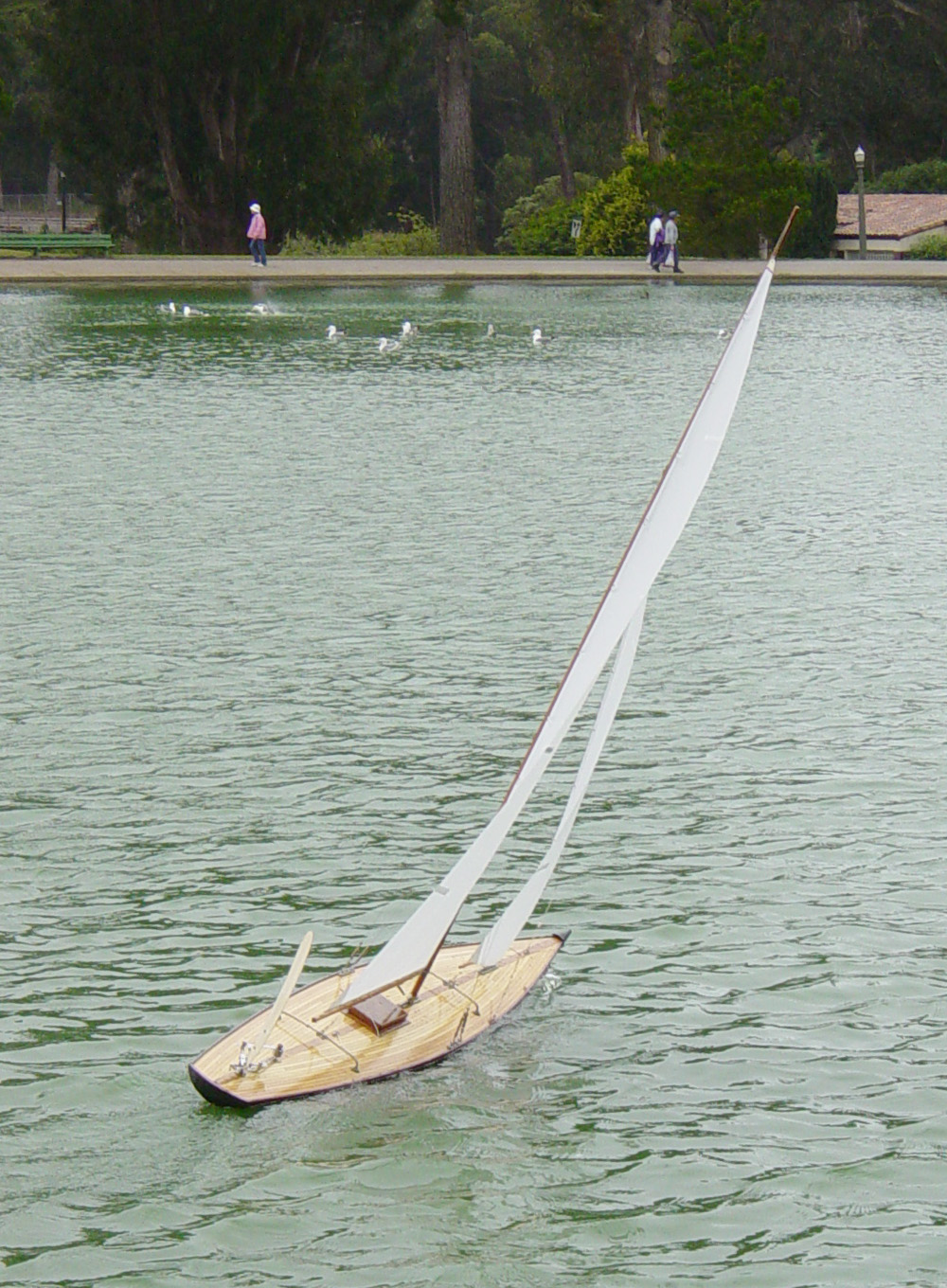
San Francisco Model Yacht Club boat on Spreckels Lake

Spreckels Lake is an artificial reservoir behind a small earthen dam that lies on the north side of the Golden Gate Park between Spreckels Lake Drive and Fulton Street to the north, and John F. Kennedy Drive to the south. It is named after sugar-fortune heir and then San Francisco Parks Commissioner Adolph B. Spreckels. Built between 1902 and 1904 at the request of the San Francisco Model Yacht Club specifically as a model boating facility, the lake was first filled in February 1904 and opened March 20, 1904. One can usually find both 'sail driven,' self-guided Yachts and electric or gas/nitro powered radio-controlled model boats of many types and designs plying the lake's waters most times of year.

Alvord Lake is located at the eastern end of the park near the intersection of Haight and Stanyan streets. It was named for William Alvord, Park Commissioner in the 1870s, and Mayor of San Francisco from 1871 to 1873, who financed its construction in 1882. A few yards west of the lake is the Alvord Lake Bridge, the oldest known reinforced concrete bridge built in the United States.

Elk Glen Lake is the park's deepest ornamental lake, measuring over 6 ft. deep on average. The lake acts as a reservoir for water from the Reclamation Plant before it is pumped to either Blue Heron Lake or the reservoir atop Strawberry Hill.

Mallard Lake is landlocked and not a part of the park's irrigation system.

Metson Lake lies west of Mallard Lake and east of the Chain of Lakes. This body of water has a capacity of over 1.1 million gallons that overflow into South Lake or can be redirected elsewhere for irrigation purposes.

Chain of Lakes Many naturalistically landscaped lakes are placed throughout the park: several are linked together into chains, with pumped water creating flowing creeks. Out of the original 14 natural marshy lakes within the sand dunes Golden Gate Park was built in, only 5 remain, three of which are the Chain of Lakes. The three lakes, North, Middle, and South Lake, are located along the Chain of Lakes Drive.

North Lake is the largest of the three, and is known for its water birds that often live on the small islands within the lake. Some of the birds spotted are egrets, belted kingfishers, ducks, and great blue herons. It is surrounded by a paved walkway that is often used by families, joggers, and dog walkers.

In 1898, McLaren started a landscaping project, inspired by Andrew Jackson Downing's teachings on building with nature. Seven islands were planted within the North Lake in 1899, using different species of shrubs and trees. A gazebo was built, and wooden footbridges were used to connect the different islands within the lake. Both the gazebo and the bridges were removed in order to conserve nesting birds on the islands.

North Lake is the final of the Chain of Lakes that flow into each other south to north, making it the final destination of the lakes' water pumped in from the Water Reclamation Plant. Should the plant's water not meet the lake's needs the water level is maintained by well water pumped from the North Windmill.

Middle Lake is particularly known for bird-watching due to the visits of migrant species of birds like tanagers, warblers and vireos. It is surrounded by a dirt trail and vegetation. The lake resembles the marshes that existed before Golden Gate Park, and is known for being a more remote and romantic setting.

South Lake is the smallest of the three lakes, and borders Martin Luther King Jr. Drive. This lake is the smallest in the Chain of Lakes. Its water is sourced from either a direct flow from Metson Lake, or by Blue Heron Lake water released by a valve. It does not contribute to irrigation in the park but it does feed into Middle Lake. Its noteworthy bird population is its ducks.

=== Bison Paddock ===
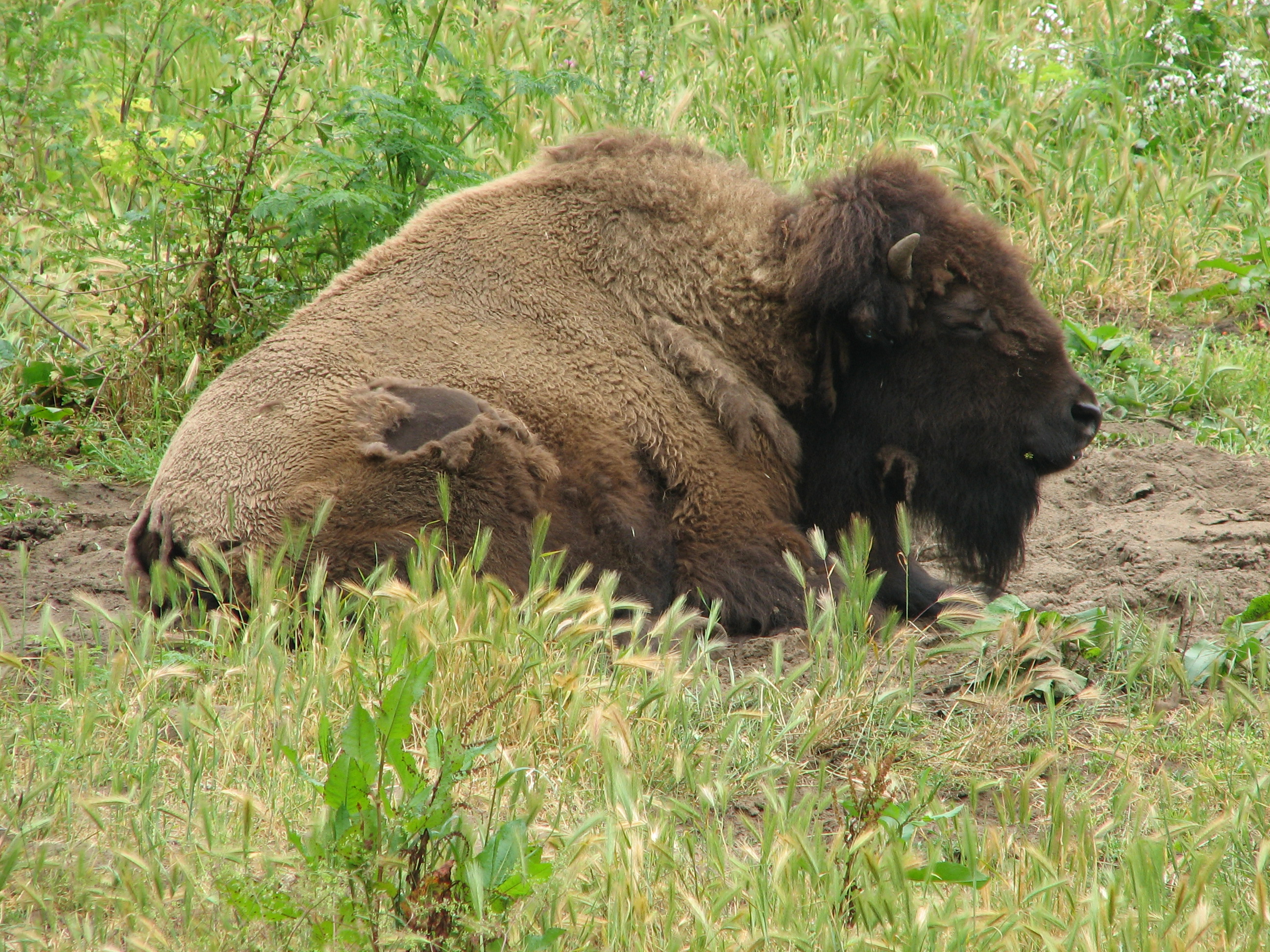
Bison Paddock, Golden Gate Park

Bison (Bison bison) have been kept in Golden Gate Park since 1891, when a small herd was purchased by the park commission. At the time, the animal's population in North America had dwindled to an all-time low, and San Francisco made a successful effort to breed them in captivity. In 1899, the paddock in the western section of the park was created. At its peak and through a successful captive breeding program, more than 100 calves were produced at Golden Gate Park, helping preserve the iconic bison population numbers in North America, which has been critical to the culture and livelihood of Native Americans.

In 1984, Mayor Dianne Feinstein's husband, Richard C. Blum, purchased a new herd as a birthday present for his wife. The older bison in the paddock today are descendants of this herd.

In December 2011, after the number of bison in the paddock had dwindled to three, Assemblywoman Fiona Ma's office led another preservation effort. With donations from the Theodore Rosen Charitable Foundation, Richard C. Blum, and the Garen Wimer Ranch, Assemblywoman Ma's office worked with the San Francisco Zoo and San Francisco Recreation and Parks to add seven new bison to the existing herd. The paddock is open to the public for viewing.

=== Hippie Hill ===
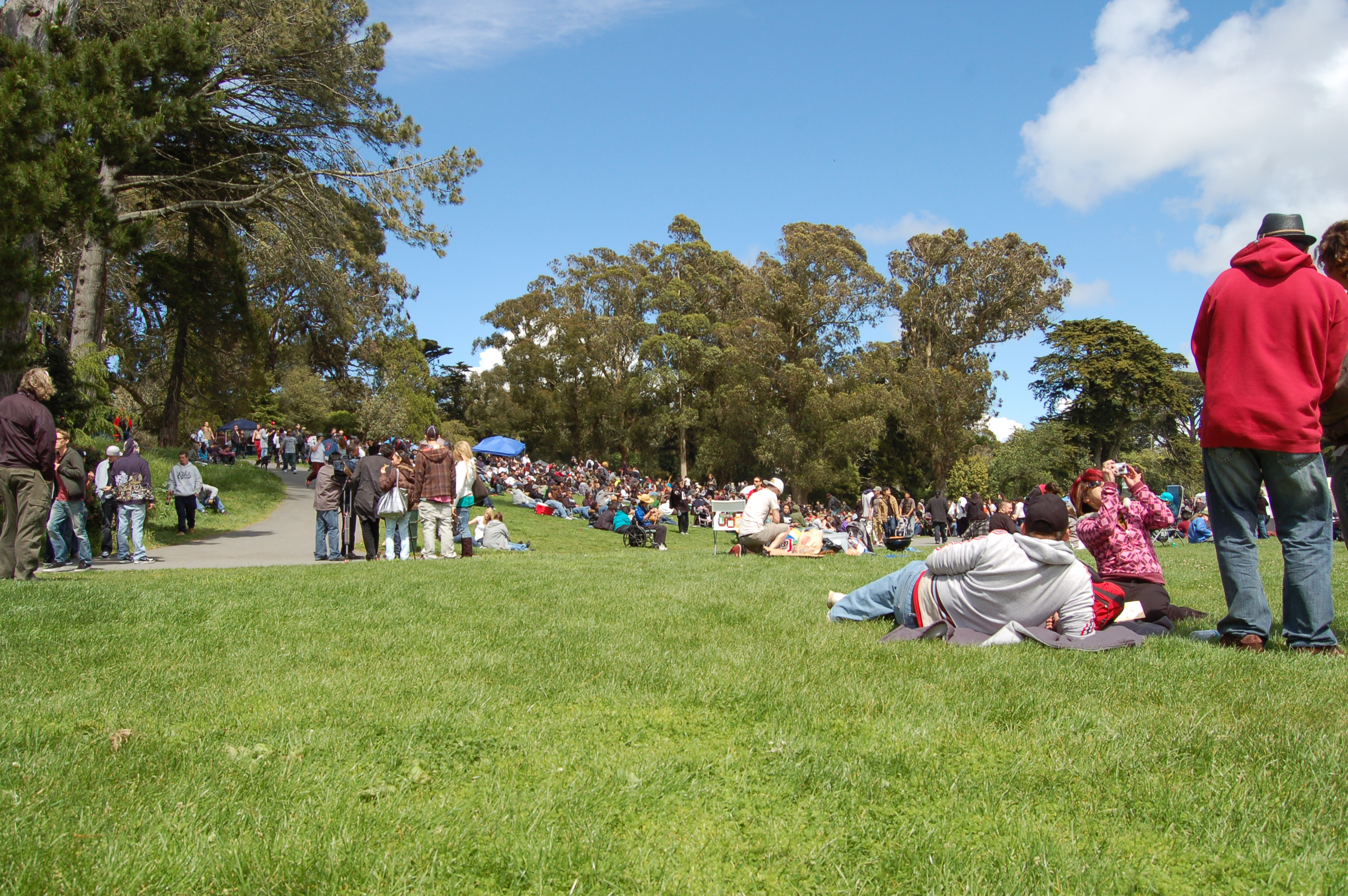
Crowd on Hippie Hill, February 2005

Nestled in the trees between the Conservatory of Flowers and Haight Street, Hippie Hill displays a lifestyle unique to San Francisco. East of the Golden Gate Park tennis courts, the green space known as Hippie Hill is a gentle sloping lawn just off of Kezar Drive and overlooking Robin Williams Meadow, with Eucalyptus and Oak on either side. Additionally, the hill contains several uncommon trees: coast banksia, titoki, turpentine, and cow-itch.

Hippie Hill has been a part of San Francisco's history, namely the Summer of Love, in 1967, a large counterculture movement that partially took place on the hill. With its close proximity to Haight Street, the main site of the Summer of Love, the movement often overflowed onto the hill. During this era, people gathered in the area to connect with one another through many activities, including the playing of music, consumption of LSD and marijuana, and expression of hippie ideals. With time, area residents began to complain of the flower children's open sexuality, nude dancing, panhandling, and excess litter.

Through this movement, music came to have its own history on the hill as well. Musicians and bands such as Janis Joplin, the Grateful Dead, Jefferson Airplane, and George Harrison all played free shows for the public near by. Today, improvised drum circles form on the weekends where people come together and fill the hill with a constant beat for hours on end. A space filled with their culture, the hill played a major part in the hippies' ability to openly use drugs and express themselves as the police adopted a policy of looking the other way.

Though the police have been known to crack down on certain occurrences in the park, the SFPD are lenient with activity on the hill. Starting from the Summer of Love when the police were unable to address the enormity of the situation, some activity is overlooked. As supervisor London Breed stated, "smoking anything in any city park is illegal, but San Francisco has a tradition of turning a blind eye to infractions for official or unofficial events." The police department has stated that they are not naïve enough to attempt to catch all the people smoking marijuana on the hill, but as Police Chief Greg Suhr said, "There are plenty of other things that come with it that we will not have."

=== Plants ===
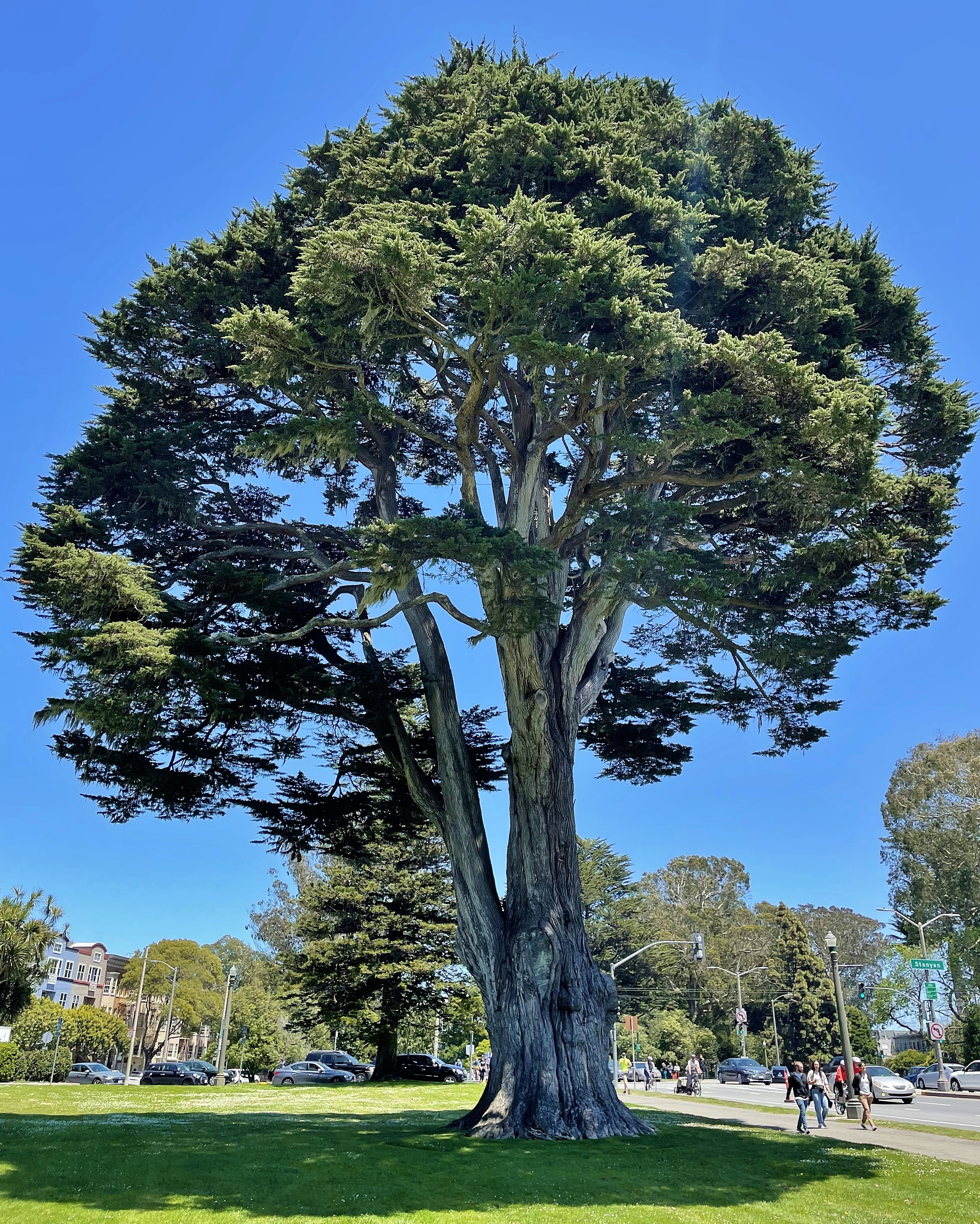
Large Monterey cypress nicknamed Norton or Uncle John's Tree, located in Golden Gate Park (June 2022)

A diverse collection of plants, from all over the world, can be found in Golden Gate Park. Acacias, like the Sydney golden wattle from Australia, were some of the first planted in the park by William Hammond Hall to stabilize the sand dunes. They still play that role in the western portion of the park and are common all around the park.

While ninety-six percent of the park is considered not a natural area, four out of the thirty-two San Francisco locations designated as natural areas by the San Francisco Recreation and Park Department's Natural Areas Program are found in Golden Gate Park. These are the Oak Woodlands, the Lily Pond, Strawberry Hill, and Whiskey Hill.

The California live oak is the only tree native to the park. Some of the oldest plants in the park are the coast live oaks in the Oak Woodlands in the northeastern portion of the park which are hundreds of years old. Oaks also grow on Strawberry Hill and in the AIDS Memorial Grove. Acorns from the oak trees were an important food source to Native American groups in San Francisco.

Other than the oak trees, the plants that are currently in the park are non-native, some of which are considered invasive species. Many have disrupted the ecosystem and harm birds, mammals, reptiles, and insects in the park. Volunteers with the Strawberry Hill Butterfly Habitat Restoration Project are removing and replacing invasive plant species to help restore the butterfly population on Strawberry Hill. Under the Significant Natural Resource Areas Management Plan, the city will remove many invasive species and replace them with native plants.

Blue gum eucalyptus, Monterey pine, and Monterey cypress were the most commonly planted trees in the park during the late 1800s. Blue gum continued to grow and spread and is now one of the most important trees found in the park. They can be found near McLaren Lodge, on Hippie Hill, and in a eucalyptus forest near Middle Lake. Monterey pines are also prevalent today and can be found in the Strybing Arboretum, the Japanese Tea Garden, and in the western portions of the park around the Buffalo Paddock.

Redwoods were planted in the park during the 1880s and can be found all around the park, most notably in Heroes Grove, Redwood Memorial Grove, AIDS Memorial Grove, Stanyan Meadows, on top of Hippie Hill, and in the Panhandle.

Tree ferns were planted early on by McLaren and continue to thrive in the park. Many can be found in the Tree Fern Dell and Lily Pond, near the Conservatory of Flowers, which is made up of mostly Tasmanian tree fern.

=== Wild animals ===
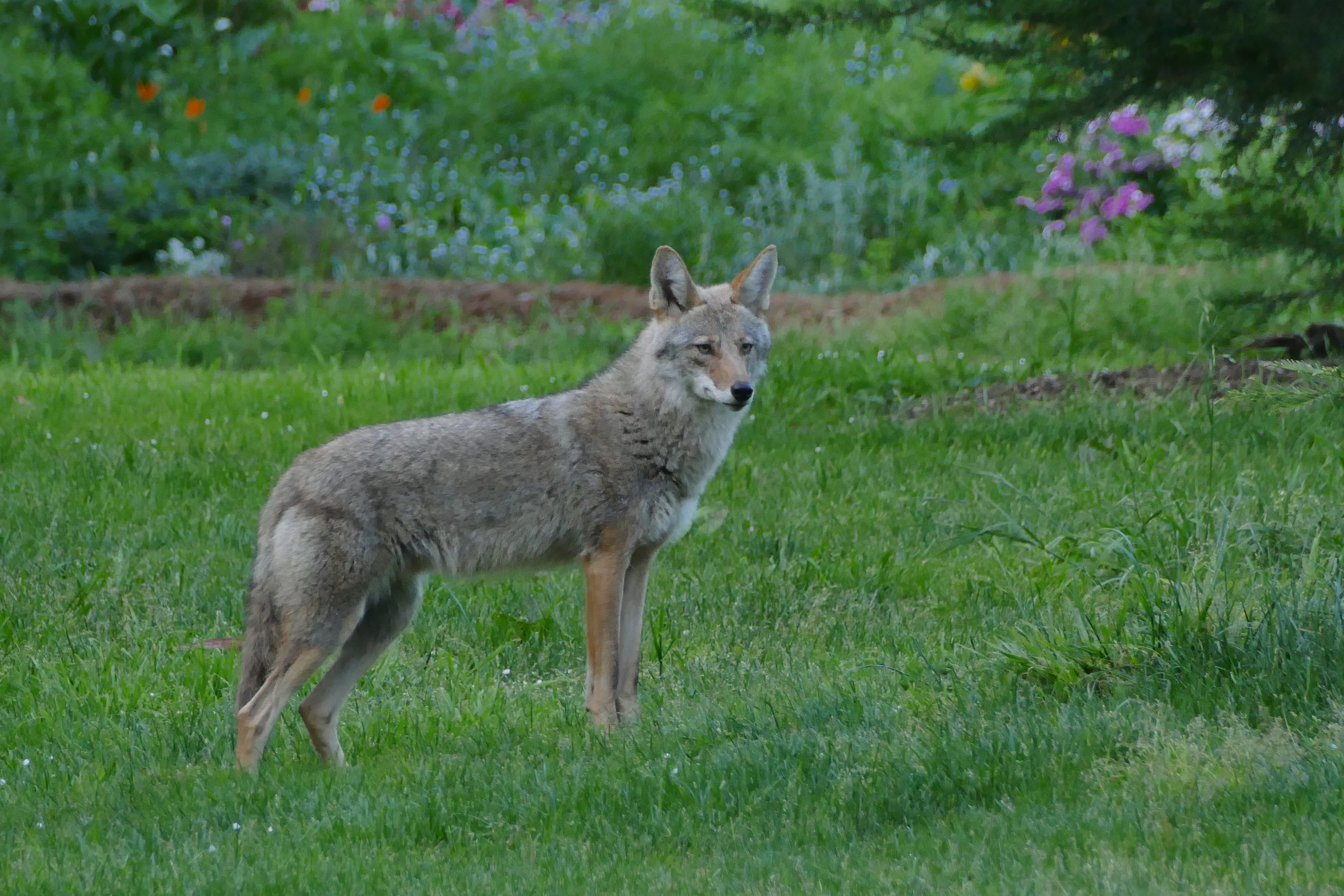
Coyote in Golden Gate Park (May 2024)

In 2013, San Francisco photographer David Cruz shot pictures of coyote pups in Golden Gate Park. It is estimated that over 100 coyotes live in San Francisco, and there have been more sightings in Golden Gate Park than any other spot in the city. Coyotes have proven adaptive in the city, as they live primarily in open prairies and deserts. Mountain lions occasionally roam the park. The first colony of great blue herons to nest in San Francisco was discovered at Blue Heron Lake in Golden Gate Park in 1993 by Nancy DeStefani and has been continuously returning to the park during the breeding season since then. The heronry features in Heron Island (1998), a short documentary directed by filmmaker Judy Irving.

== Dedicated areas and memorials ==
=== National AIDS Memorial Grove ===
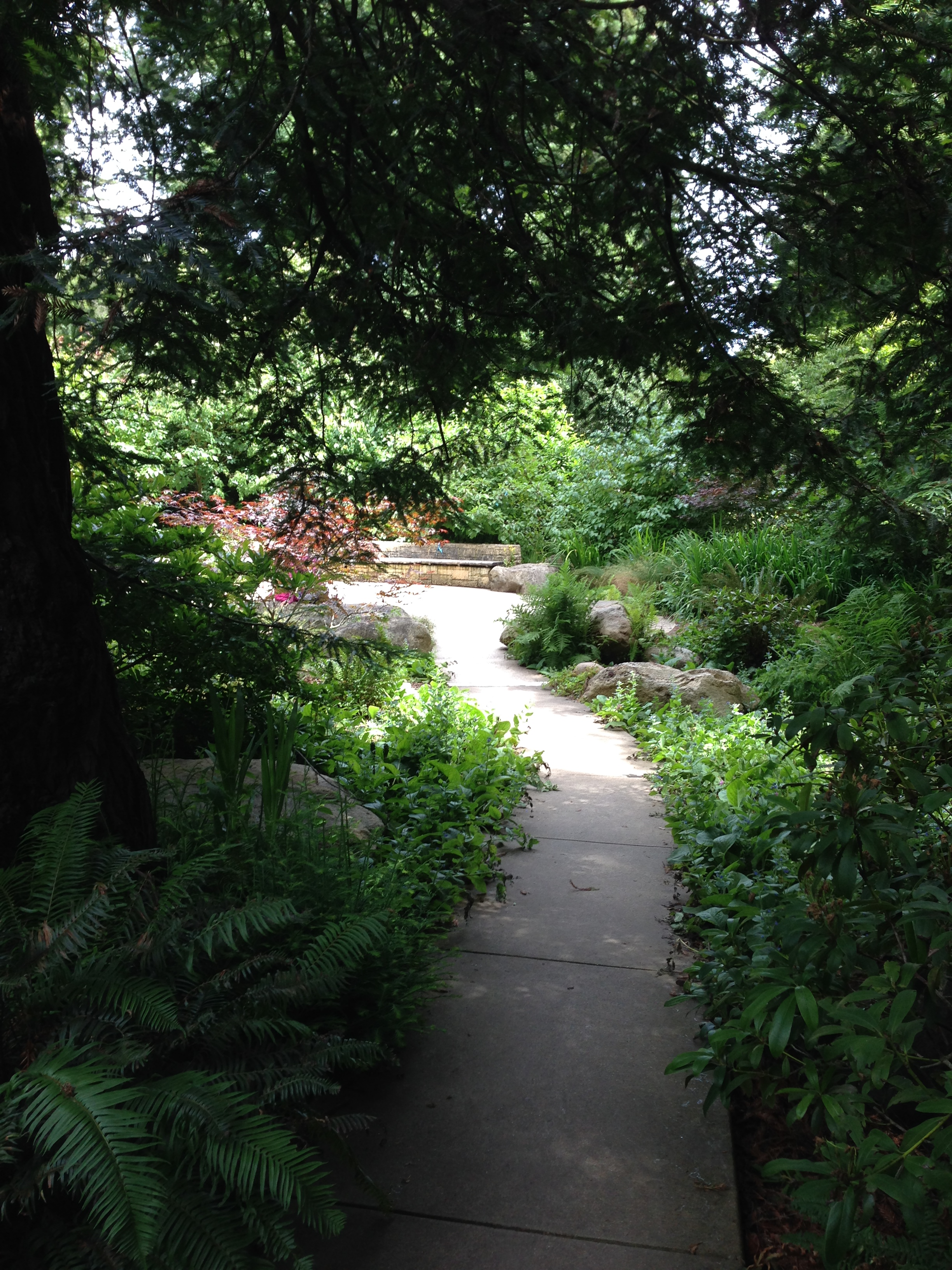
The National AIDS Memorial Grove

In the decades following the first reports of AIDS in the United States in 1981, some Americans were overwhelmed with the devastation of the AIDS epidemic. In 1988 a few San Franciscans belonging to communities hit hard by the AIDS epidemic envisioned a place of remembrance for those who had died from AIDS. They imagined a serene AIDS memorial where people could go to heal. Renovation for the National Aids Memorial Grove began in September 1991 and continues today as communities are constantly working to improve it. Located at 856 Stanyan Street, in the eastern portion of Golden Gate Park, the Grove stretches across seven acres of land. In 1996, due to Nancy Pelosi's efforts, the "National AIDS Memorial Grove Act" was passed by Congress and the President of the United States, Bill Clinton, which officially made those seven acres of Golden Gate Park the first AIDS memorial in the United States. Then in 1999, it earned the Rudy Bruner Silver Medal Award for excellence in the urban environment.

Located at the Dogwood Crescent the Circle of Friends is the heart of the grove. The Circle of Friends has over 1,500 names inscribed on its flagstone ground which represent lives lost to AIDS. If one wishes to inscribe a name into the Circle of Friends they must donate $1,000 to the memorial and the name will be inscribed before the Worlds AIDS day commemoration on December 1. Funded privately and tended by over 500 of volunteers, The National AIDS Memorial Grove remains a sanctuary for remembrance.

On November 30 an annual Light in the Grove fundraising gala is held in the Grove. This event, held on the eve of Worlds Aids Day, sells out each year and was voted "Best Bay Area LGBT Fundraiser" by Bay Area Reporter readers in 2015.

=== Shakespeare Garden ===
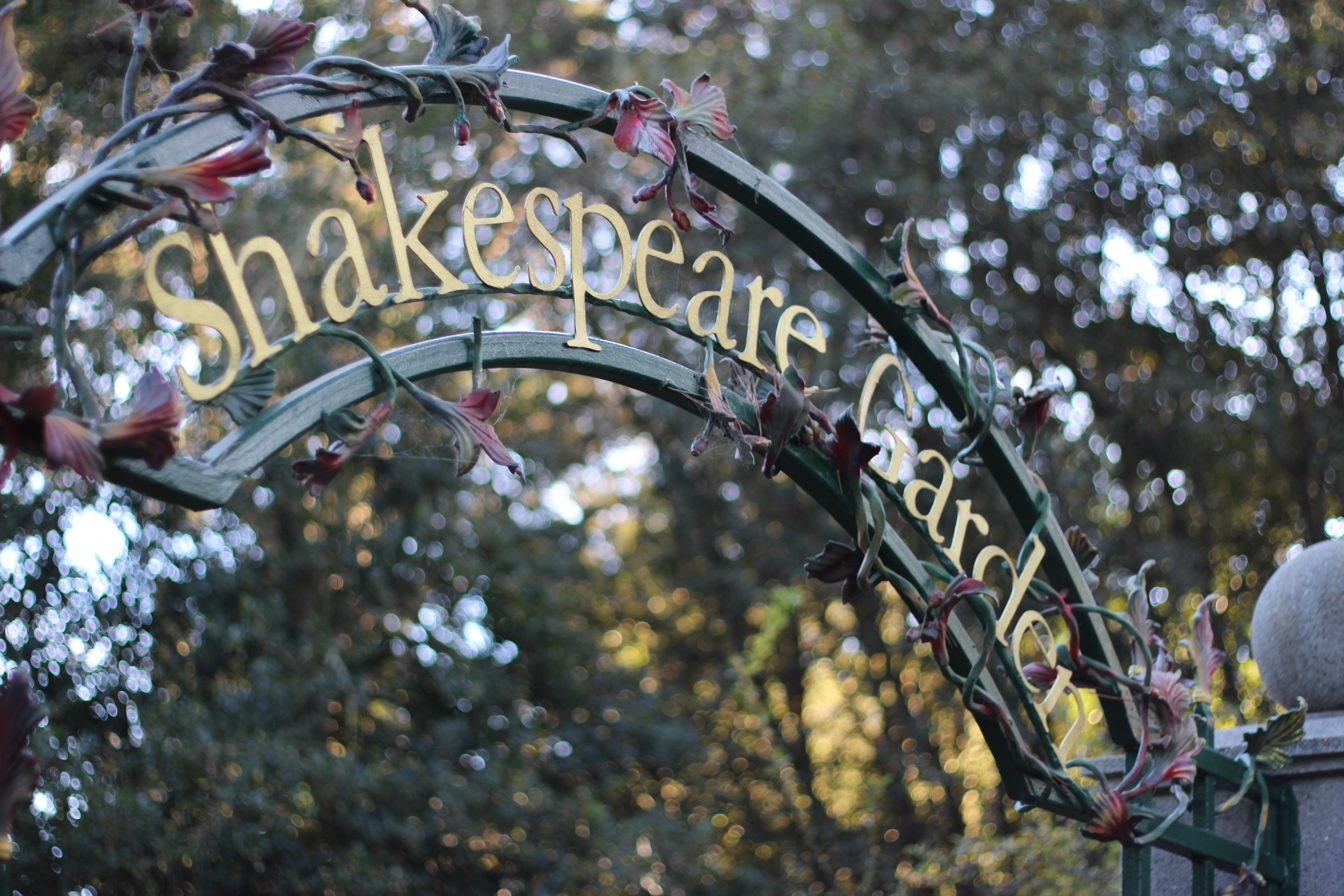
The gate to the Shakespeare Garden

The Shakespeare Garden is a relatively small "17th century classical garden" located directly southwest of the California Academy of Sciences. It is a tribute to William Shakespeare and his works, decorated with flowers and plants that are mentioned in his plays. The entrance is an ornate metal gate that says "Shakespeare Garden" intertwined with vines. Directly past the entrance is a walkway overarched with trees and lined with small flowers and a sundial in the center. The main area has a large moss tree and benches. At the end of the garden there is a wooden padlocked shelf containing a bust of William Shakespeare. The cast was made and given to the garden by George Bullock in 1918 and has remained behind locked doors since around 1950 to prevent people from cutting off pieces of the bronze statue to melt down. Around the bust, there are four plaques, originally six, with quotes from Shakespeare. The missing two were stolen and most likely sold and melted down so the thieves could make a profit from the bronze the plaques were made from.

Alice Eastwood, the director of botany from the California Academy of Sciences at the time, came up with the idea for the garden in 1928, and it was carried out by Katherine Agnes Chandler. It however is not unique, as there are several Shakespeare gardens around the world, including "Cleveland, Manhattan, Vienna, and Johannesburg." The garden is a popular spot for weddings. There are over 200 plants mentioned in Shakespeare's works.

=== Rose Garden ===
The Rose Garden is found between the John F. Kennedy Promenade and Park Presidio Boulevard.

=== Dahlia Garden ===
The Dahlia Garden is found just to the East of the Conservatory of Flowers, and is maintained by volunteers from the Dahlia Society of California, founded in 1917.

== Sports and recreation ==
Golden Gate park contains many areas for sports and recreation including tennis courts, soccer fields, baseball fields, lawn bowling fields, an angling and casting club, a disc golf course, horseshoe pits, an archery range, the polo field, and Kezar Stadium. Golden Gate park formed the first Lawn Bowling Club in the United States in 1901, with an Edwardian style clubhouse constructed in 1915. The 2015 San Francisco 1st Half Marathon, started near the Ferry Building and finished inside Golden Gate Park.

=== Kezar Stadium ===
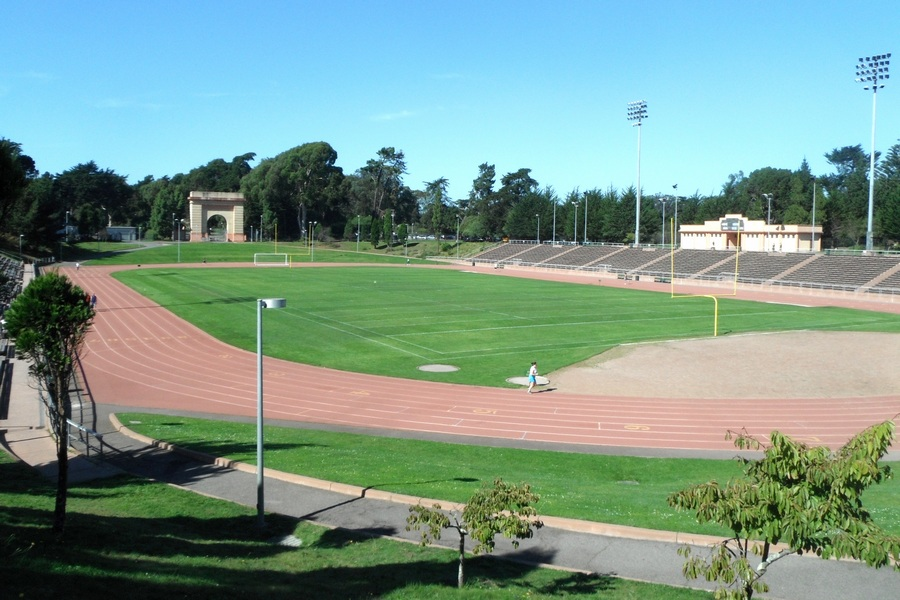
Kezar Stadium was home to the San Francisco 49ers from 1946 to 1970.

Kezar Stadium was built between 1922 and 1925 in the southeast corner of the park. It hosted various athletic competitions throughout its existence. It served as the home stadium of the San Francisco 49ers of the AAFC and NFL from 1946 to 1970, and for one season in 1960, it hosted the Oakland Raiders of the AFL.

The 59,000-seat stadium was demolished in 1989 and replaced with a modern 9,044-seat stadium, which includes a replica of the original concrete arch at the entryway.

The stadium has been used in recent years for soccer, lacrosse, and track and field. The stadium also holds the annual city high school football championship, the Turkey Bowl. The Turkey Bowl dates to 1924 and is played each Thanksgiving. The game was held at Lowell High School in 2014 because Kezar was closed due to renovation of the running track. Galileo High School has the most overall wins in the game (16) after breaking Abraham Lincoln High School's record four-game winning streak in 2009.

The stadium also hosts the football game in the three-part Bruce-Mahoney Trophy competition between Sacred Heart Cathedral Preparatory and Saint Ignatius College Preparatory, two Catholic high schools in San Francisco, in addition to serving as the home field for Sacred Heart Cathedral's football program.

=== The Polo Field ===
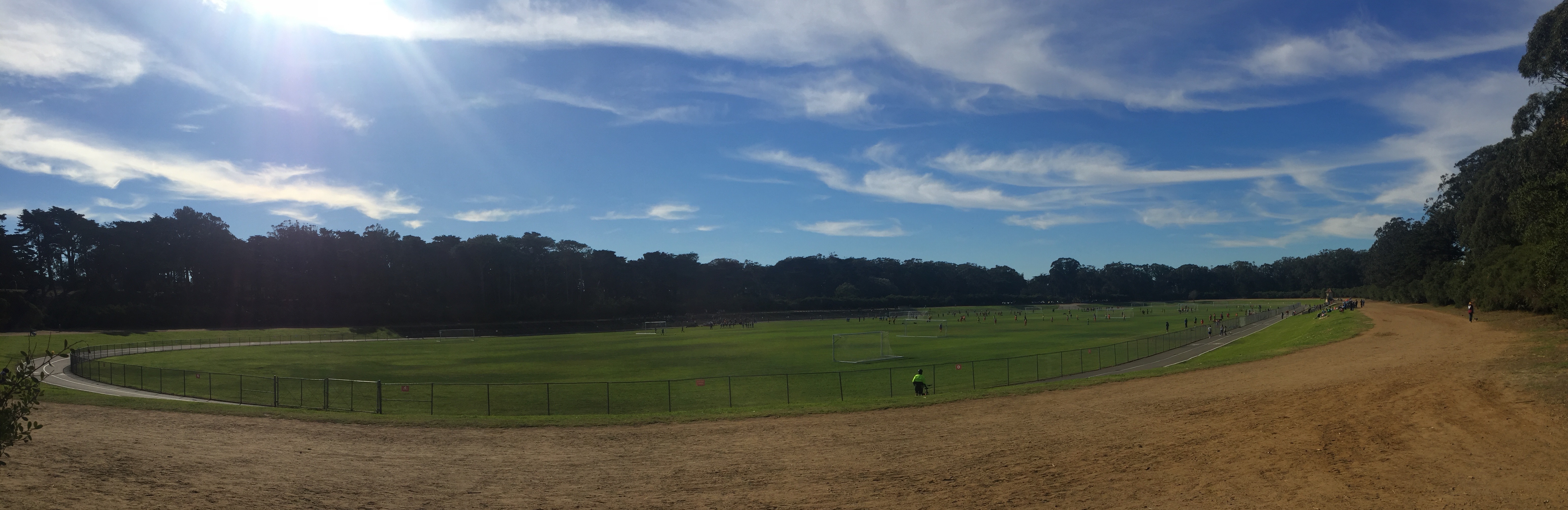
The Polo Field in Golden Gate Park

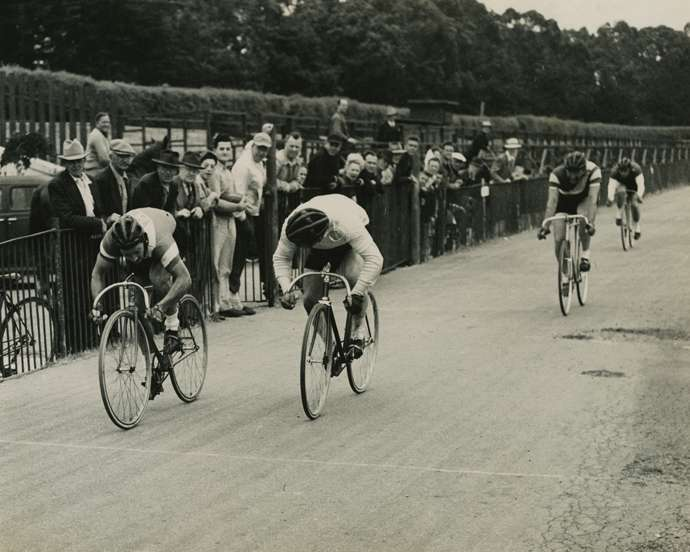
Early 1900s track cycling race in the Polo Fields

The sport of polo came to California in 1876, when the California Polo Club was established with help of Bay Area native, Captain Nell Mowry. By the late 1800s, polo in San Francisco was dominated by the Golden Gate Driving Club and the San Francisco Driving Club. In 1906, the Golden Gate Park Stadium was built by private subscription from the driving clubs which contained both a polo field and a cycling velodrome. Later on, the stadium was renamed simply the Polo Field. In the mid-1930s, the City and County of San Francisco used PWA and WPA funds to renovate the polo field. In 1939, additional WPA funds were used to build polo sheds, replacing already-standing horse stables. Polo continued being played through the 1940s but by the 1950s polo stopped being played on the Polo Field because the sport had largely migrated to other bay area cities where land more suitable for polo was available. In 1985 and 1986, polo was brought back to the Polo Field in Golden Gate Park for the second and third annual San Francisco Grand Prix and Equestrian Festival. Today, polo is not regularly played on the Polo Field, but from 2006 to 2010 Polo in the Park was hosted annually.

The Polo Fields has a history of cycling lasting from 1906 to the 21st century. The Polo Fields were originally created for track cycling in 1906, as track cycling was a popular sport in the early 1900s. Despite a down-surge of popularity in the mid-1900s, track cycling has seen a rebirth ever since the introduction of more track cycling programs in the Olympics in 2003. San Francisco has seen a surge in cycling popularity, and groups such as "Friends of the Polo Field Cycling Track" have recently formed.

The field has an extensive history with music and events. Because of the location and size of the Polo Fields, various events are commonly held on the field. Historically, many major music festivals took place in the park, including the Human Be-In, which featured bands like the Grateful Dead and Jefferson Airplane. More contemporary music festivals such as the Outside Lands and Hardly Strictly Bluegrass also take place on or nearby the Polo Fields. One of the largest public gatherings in San Francisco took place in the Polo Fields—a public Rosary in 1961 with 550,000 people. Public political events were also held at the field, such as the anti-Vietnam War rally in 1969 and the Tibetan Freedom Concert in 1996.

Now in the 21st century, the Polo Field is split into two divisions: the inner soccer field, and the flat-style cycling velodrome found around the field itself. Today many sports are played in the polo fields, including soccer, cross country running, and various types of cycling. The cycling track is still alive, with a large number of time-trial races held every cycling season. A cyclist in 2013 set a record in the park by riding a total of 188.5 miles on the Polo Field velodrome, circling it 279 times in just over twelve hours. In 2023 a new cycling track distance record was set at 201.0 miles over 296 laps in 11 hours 6 minutes.

=== Archery range ===
Archery was first organized in Golden Gate Park in 1881. However, there was not a devoted range specifically for archery until around 1933. In 1936, during Franklin D. Roosevelt's presidency, many parts of Golden Gate Park, including the archery range, were improved as part of the Works Progress Administration (WPA). With WPA support, the archery range was increased in size and the adjacent hill was carved to serve as a backdrop for stray arrows. Bales of hay are used as targets and are provided by the Golden Gate Joad Archery Club as well as donations from other donors. The Golden Gate Park Archery Range is located right inside the park off of 47th Street and Fulton Street. It is open whenever the park is open and is free to use by anyone. There is no staff and equipment is not offered to be rented at the range, however there are archery stores nearby for rentals and there are multiple groups that offer training and lessons.

== Golden Gate Park Nursery ==
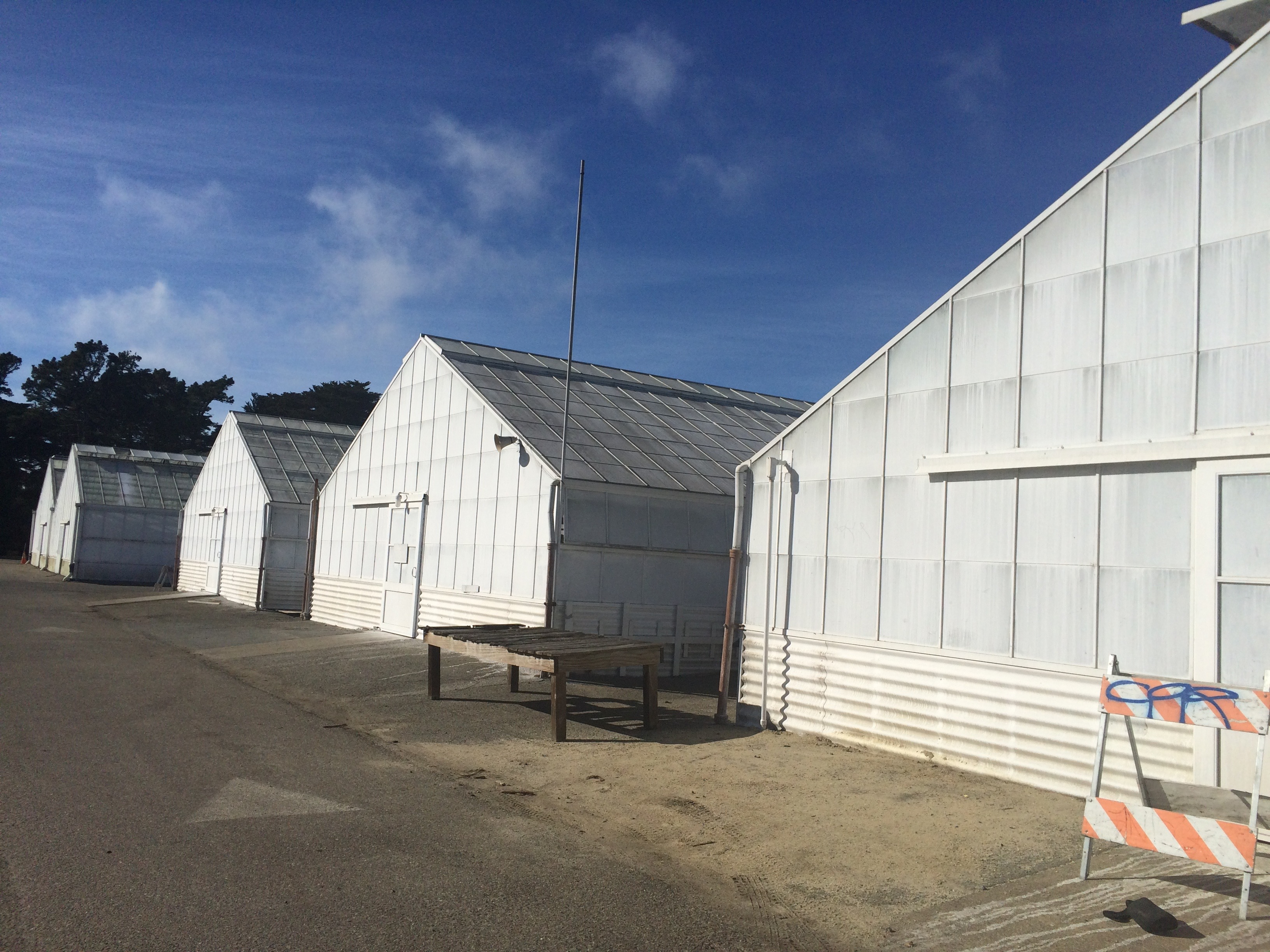
Green houses inside of Golden Gate Park Nursery

Established in 1870, the Golden Gate Park Nursery has remained one of the few places in the park restricted to the public. This nursery began with donated plants from around the world and expanded over the years with the care of past Golden Gate Park gardeners. The nursery has moved around the park thrice; first to where McLaren Lodge stands today, then to where Kezar Stadium is currently located and finally to its current location of Martin Luther King Jr. Drive. This Nursery houses over 800 species of plants, some of which are exclusive to the nursery, and are sold to the public on the third Saturday of the month. Every week over 3,000 plants are dispersed within the city and park.

== Homeless population ==
In 2017, there were approximately 7,500 homeless people living in San Francisco. Around 40 to 200 of these people were estimated to reside in the park as of 2013. Around half of the homeless population in Golden Gate Park are short-term residents that leave after a certain amount of time, and the other half are more long-term residents. Short-term residents tend to be younger, while permanent residents tend to be older, military veterans. Most of the homeless population is male. It is estimated that around 60% of the population may have a mental disability. However, it is hard to gather data about the population due to its variability.

The city government of San Francisco has attempted to establish various outreach programs in order to help the homeless population. The city's government stated in 2013 that "current outreach efforts to inform park dwellers about support services are limited, and efforts that do take place are not documented in a way that makes it possible to analyze their efficiency or success".

The City of San Francisco has grappled with what to do about camps of homeless people living in Golden Gate Park, which have been criticized as unsanitary, and "demoralizing" for park users and workers. The camps have been described by journalists as full of garbage, broken glass, hypodermic needles, and human excrement, and the people in them are described as suffering from serious addictions and often behaving aggressively with police and park gardeners. There have been occasional incidents of violence against homeless people in the park, including the 2010 park beating to death of a homeless man and an attack on park visitors by dogs owned by a park resident, also in 2010. In the 1990s, then-Mayor Willie Brown sought unsuccessfully to borrow the Oakland Police Department's helicopters in order to find homeless people's camps.

Starting in 1988 under then-mayor Art Agnos, and continuing under the direction of subsequent mayors including Frank Jordan, Willie Brown, and Gavin Newsom, San Francisco police have conducted intermittent sweeps of the park aimed at eliminating the camps. Tactics have included information campaigns designed to inform homeless residents about city services available to help them; waking sleeping homeless people and making them leave the park; issuing citations for infractions and misdemeanors such as camping, trespassing, or public intoxication, which carry penalties of $75 to $100; and the seizure and removal from the park of homeless people's possessions. During the night, police urge visitors to Golden Gate Park to be careful around homeless people.

The crackdowns have been criticized by anti-poverty activists and civil liberties groups, who say the measures attack only the symptoms of homelessness, while ignoring its root causes, and criminalize the poor for their poverty while ignoring their property rights and constitutional rights. In 2006, the American Civil Liberties Union brought a lawsuit against the city government on behalf of 10 homeless people, alleging property violations by the city during sweeps in Golden Gate Park the year before.

== In popular culture ==
Books

- A book, titled Five Thousand Concerts in the Park, lists and describes the long history with music of Hellman Hollow, originally called Speedway Meadow and renamed in 2011 in honor of Warren Hellman.

Events

The tradition of large, free public gatherings in the park continues to the present, especially at Hellman Hollow. Since the park's conception, over 5,000 concerts have been held in the park.

- In 2001, Hellman founded the Hardly Strictly Bluegrass Festival (formerly the "Strictly Bluegrass Festival"), a free music festival held in October.
- Hellman Hollow also plays host to a number of large-scale events, such as the 911 Power to the Peaceful Festival held by musician and filmmaker Michael Franti with Guerrilla Management.
- Since 2008, the Outside Lands Music and Arts Festival has been hosted every August in the park's Polo Fields.

Films

A scene from the Charlie Chaplin film A Jitney Elopement, filmed in Golden Gate Park

- Charlie Chaplin filmed scenes in the park for at least two 1915 movies, including A Jitney Elopement and In the Park
- Another silent comedy short was filmed in the park, Wished on Mabel (1915), starring Mabel Normand and Roscoe "Fatty" Arbuckle; various early features of the park can be seen in this 12-minute film, including several views of Stone Bridge
- A sequence in the lost Sessue Hayakawa film, A Heart in Pawn was filmed at the Japanese Tea Garden.
- A scene in Orson Welles' The Lady from Shanghai (1947) was shot in the Steinhart Aquarium in the old California Academy of Sciences building
- In the Bugs Bunny cartoon Bushy Hare (1950), Bugs pops up at Portals of the Past at Lloyd Lake, the remains of the A. E. Towne mansion from Nob Hill after the 1906 earthquake
- Scaramouche (1952) includes scenes of duels looking west into the fog at Speedway Meadows, and interiors in De Young Museum's old period rooms
- In The Lineup (1958), scenes were shot inside the Steinhart Aquarium
- At Golden Gate Park is a live recording of the concert given on May 7, 1969, by the Jefferson Airplane in Golden Gate Park
- Dirty Harry (1971) scenes were filmed in Kezar Stadium
- The Conservatory of Flowers was filmed in Harold and Maude (1971)
- The opening scene of the 1978 version of Invasion of the Bodysnatchers was filmed on the outskirts of Golden Gate Park
- In the film Time After Time (1979), Malcolm McDowell can be seen exiting the park near 6th Avenue in the Richmond District
- The Spock casket scene near the end of Star Trek II: The Wrath of Khan (1982) was filmed in an overgrown corner of the park, using smoke machines to add a primal atmosphere
- In Star Trek IV: The Voyage Home (1986), a Klingon Bird-of-Prey is said to land in the park, but the scene was actually filmed at Will Rogers State Historic Park near Los Angeles due to heavy rainfall
- One of a number of scenes of characters playing football in The Room (2003) is shot in Golden Gate Park's Hellman Hollow
- A scene from The Pursuit of Happyness (2006) was shot in the Children's Playground
- Contagion (2011) includes a scene filmed at the Music Concourse
- The film The Diary Of A Teenage Girl (2015) filmed its opening scene in Golden Gate Park
- Several scenes in Always Be My Maybe (2019) are set in Golden Gate Park.

Television

- In the Eli Stone TV episode, "Waiting for that Day" (2008), some citizens of San Francisco seek refuge in the park during a 6.8 earthquake; they later witness the destruction of the Golden Gate Bridge from the park, though in reality, the bridge isn't visible from the park

== See also ==
- List of parks in San Francisco
- Kezar Pavilion
- 1894 California Midwinter Exposition
