= January 1904 =

Month of 1904

<<	January 1904					>>
Su	Mo	Tu	We	Th	Fr	Sa
					1	2
3	4	5	6	7	8	9
10	11	12	13	14	15	16
17	18	19	20	21	22	23
24	25	26	27	28	29	30
31

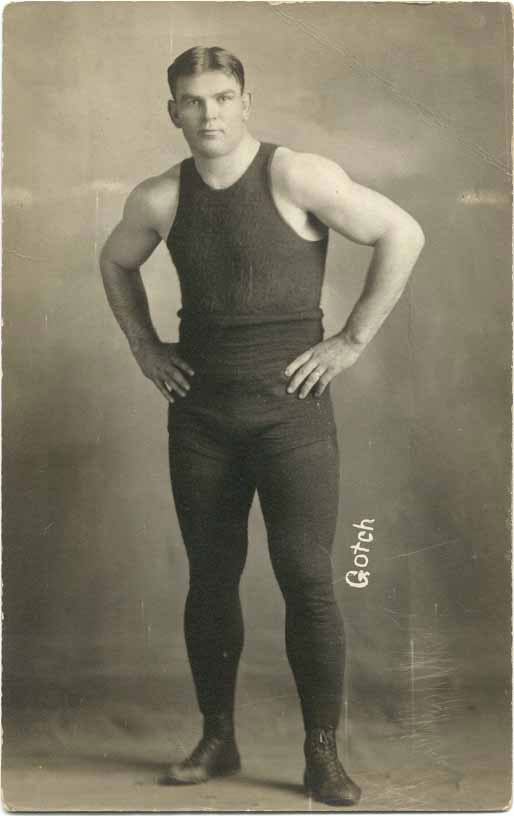
January 27, 1904: American professional wrestler Frank Gotch...

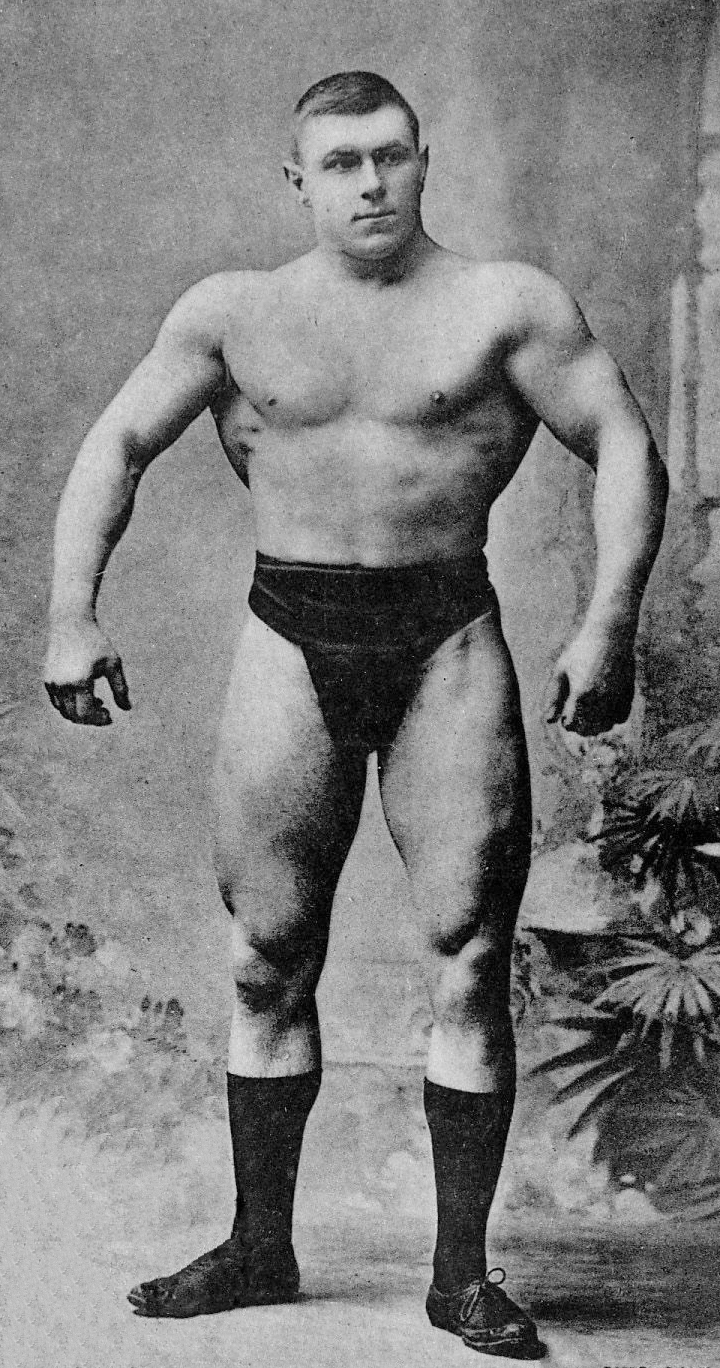
January 30, 1904: Estonian professional wrestler George Hackenschmidt...

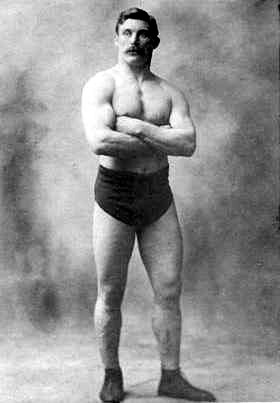
...defeats Tom Jenkins for the American Heavyweight Championship

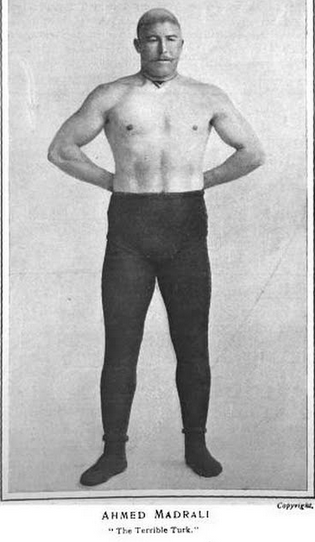
...defeats Turkish wrestler Ahmed Madrali for the world championship

The following events occurred in January 1904:

== January 1, 1904 (Friday) ==
- Boston's polar bear club, the L Street Brownies, held their first documented New Year's Day swim in Boston Harbor.
- The Louvre Hotel on Lake Avenue in Chicago, Illinois, was destroyed by fire. Three people, including a 12-year-old boy and his mother, died of smoke inhalation, and four people were injured. According to an article in The San Francisco Call, "With the remembrance of the Iroquois Theater horror fresh in their minds, all persons in the place became panic-stricken and rushed madly for the streets as soon as it became known that the hotel was on fire."
- Born: Fazal Ilahi Chaudhry, Pakistani politician; in Kharian, Gujrat District, Punjab Province, British India (d. 1982)
- Died:
  - James J. Belden, 78, member of the United States House of Representatives from New York, died of uremic poisoning.
  - Konoe Atsumaro, 40, Japanese politician
  - Frederick Pabst, 67, German American brewer, died of pulmonary edema.

== January 2, 1904 (Saturday) ==
- Julio Argentino Roca, the President of Argentina, issued a decree confirming the transfer of the British meteorological station on Laurie Island, which would become Orcadas Base, to Argentina.
- The First Physical Culture Exhibition, the first large-scale bodybuilding competition in America, concluded at Madison Square Garden in New York City, having begun on December 28, 1903. American bodybuilder Al Treloar won the competition.
- During a matinee performance at the Thalia Theater on the Bowery in New York City, a false cry of fire nearly caused a human crush. A group of policemen in the lobby averted disaster by attacking audience members with clubs and fists and forcing them back inside, bringing a sudden end to the panic.
- Born:
  - Walter Heitler, German physicist; in Karlsruhe (d. 1981)
  - Truus Klapwijk (born Geertruida Klapwijk), Dutch Olympic water polo player, diver and freestyle swimmer; in Rotterdam (d. 1991)
  - James Melton, American popular and operatic tenor singer; in Moultrie, Georgia (d. 1961, lobar pneumonia)
- Died:
  - Mathilde Bonaparte, 83, French princess
  - Harvey Ellis, 51, American architect and furniture designer
  - Queen Hyojeong, 72, Empress Dowager of Korea
  - James Longstreet, 82, American Civil War Confederate general and United States Minister to the Ottoman Empire, died of pneumonia.

== January 3, 1904 (Sunday) ==
- St. Catherine's Academy, a girls' Catholic school near Springfield, Kentucky, was totally destroyed by fire, causing about $200,000 in damage but no deaths.
- A derailment on the Western Maryland Railroad east of Hagerstown, Maryland, killed two people, including a 5-year-old girl, and injured 30.
- An explosion at an anniversary dance in Keasbey, New Jersey, for the St Johns Benevolent Society injured 30 people, some seriously.
- Colorado Governor James Hamilton Peabody placed Telluride, Colorado under modified martial law.
- Born:
  - Boris Kochno, Russian poet, dancer and librettist; in Moscow (d. 1990, fall)
  - Carlos Nascimento, Brazilian footballer and manager; in Rio de Janeiro (d. 1979)
- Died: Larin Paraske, 70, Izhorian oral poet

== January 4, 1904 (Monday) ==
- The Committee on Military Ballooning of the British War Office issued its final report on its post-Second Boer War assessment of aeronautics. Much of the report would soon be rendered obsolete as news spread of the Wright brothers' flights in the Wright Flyer the previous month.
- The Lewis Hotel in Jewett City, Connecticut was destroyed by fire, resulting in about $25,000 of property damage. Firefighters battled the flames in temperatures of −22 °F (−30 °C).
- The United States Supreme Court issued its ruling in the case of Gonzales v. Williams, determining that citizens of Puerto Rico were not aliens and could not be denied entry at American ports.
- The Iowa State Capitol in Des Moines, Iowa, was severely damaged by a fire started by a candle which an electrician left burning. The interior of the House of Representatives chamber was largely destroyed. Engineer Crampton Linley was credited with saving the building by leading a group of men to close doors separating the Capitol's wings. The following morning, while inspecting the damage above the ceiling of the House Chamber, Linley would fall through the ceiling to his death.
- In Corvallis, Oregon, twenty vigilantes tarred and feathered Edmund Creffield, leader of a group of Holy Rollers, and his fellow leader H. Brooks. Creffield would marry Maude Hurt, daughter of his former follower O. V. Hurt, the following day in Albany, Oregon.
- Born:
  - Frédéric Adam, French composer, conductor and administrator; in Hinsbourg, Alsace (d. 1984)
  - Erik Chisholm, Scottish composer; in Cathcart, Glasgow (d. 1965, heart attack)
  - Audrey Emery, American heiress and socialite; in Cincinnati, Ohio (d. 1971)
  - Tom Helmore, English film actor; in London (d. 1995)
  - Hjördis Töpel, Swedish Olympic diver and swimmer; in Gothenburg (d. 1987)
- Died:
  - Mitrofan Belyayev, 67, Russian music publisher and philanthropist
  - Thomas C. Campbell, 58, American lawyer and politician, died from the aftereffects of exposure aboard the grounded yacht Roamer.
  - Friedrich Jolly, 59, German neurologist
  - Elizabeth Wormeley Latimer, 81, English-American author
  - Anna Winlock, 46, American astronomer and human computer

== January 5, 1904 (Tuesday) ==
- An explosion in the nitroglycerin department of the National Explosives Works, 3 miles (4.8 km) from St Ives, Cornwall, killed four men, caused multiple injuries, and shattered windows in St. Ives and Penzance.
- Born:
  - Miguel Capuccini, Uruguayan footballer; in Montevideo (d. 1980)
  - Jeane Dixon (born Lydia Emma Pinckert), American astrologer; in Medford, Wisconsin (d. 1997)
  - Erika Morini, Austrian violinist; in Vienna (d. 1995, heart disease)
  - Otto Niebergall, Communist Party of Germany politician; in Kusel (d. 1977)
- Died:
  - Count Arthur John Moore KHS, 54, Irish nationalist politician
  - William Campbell Walker, CMG, 66–67, New Zealand politician
  - Karl Alfred von Zittel, 64, German paleontologist, died of heart disease.

== January 6, 1904 (Wednesday) ==
- Italian composer Giacomo Puccini arrived in Milan to supervise rehearsals of his new opera Madama Butterfly, which would receive its world premiere at La Scala on February 17.
- The Associated Press published a statement issued the previous day by the Wright brothers correcting published misinformation about their December 1903 flights.
- The wreck of a passenger train on the Rock Island Railroad in Willard, Kansas resulted in 17 deaths and 37 injuries.
- Born:
  - Aimée Bologne-Lemaire (born Estelle Aimée Lemaire), Belgian feminist and Walloon activist; in Saint-Gilles, Belgium (d. 1998)
  - Ilya Musin, Russian conductor; in Kostroma (d. 1999)
  - Ramiro Prialé, Peruvian politician; in Huancayo, Department of Junín (d. 1988)

== January 7, 1904 (Thursday) ==
- The distress signal CQD was established, only to be replaced two years later by SOS.
- Alexander Graham Bell and his wife, Mabel Gardiner Hubbard, left the port of Genoa, Italy, aboard the German steamship Princess Irene with the remains of James Smithson, benefactor of the Smithsonian Institution.
- Irish author James Joyce wrote the essay "A Portrait of the Artist", elements of which he would incorporate into his later works Stephen Hero and Ulysses.
- In New York City, three employees of the Brooklyn Union Elevated Railroad — a yardmaster, a car coupler and a foreman — were killed in a collision between two trains.
- Born:
  - Charles Collins, American singer and actor; in Frederick, Oklahoma (d. 1999)
  - Ruth Landshoff (born Ruth Levy), German American actress and writer; in Berlin (d. 1966)
  - Edoardo Volterra, Italian scholar of Roman law; in Rome (d. 1984)
- Died:
  - Ruth Cleveland, 12, daughter of former U.S. President Grover Cleveland, died of diphtheria.
  - Parke Godwin, 87, American journalist
  - Friedrich von Hefner-Alteneck, 58, German engineer
  - Hippolyte Auguste Marinoni, 80, French publisher and builder of rotary printing presses
  - Emmanuel Rhoides, 67, Greek writer
  - Sir Albert Woods Kt GCVO KCB KCMG KStJ FSA, 87, English officer of arms

== January 8, 1904 (Friday) ==
- The steamboat Clallam sank in the Strait of Juan de Fuca with the loss of 56 lives. Every woman and child aboard drowned due to accidents involving the lifeboats. At the Clallam's launching on April 15, 1903, the traditional bottle of champagne had failed to break on the boat's bow.

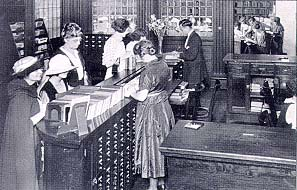
The interior of the Blackstone Library in 1904

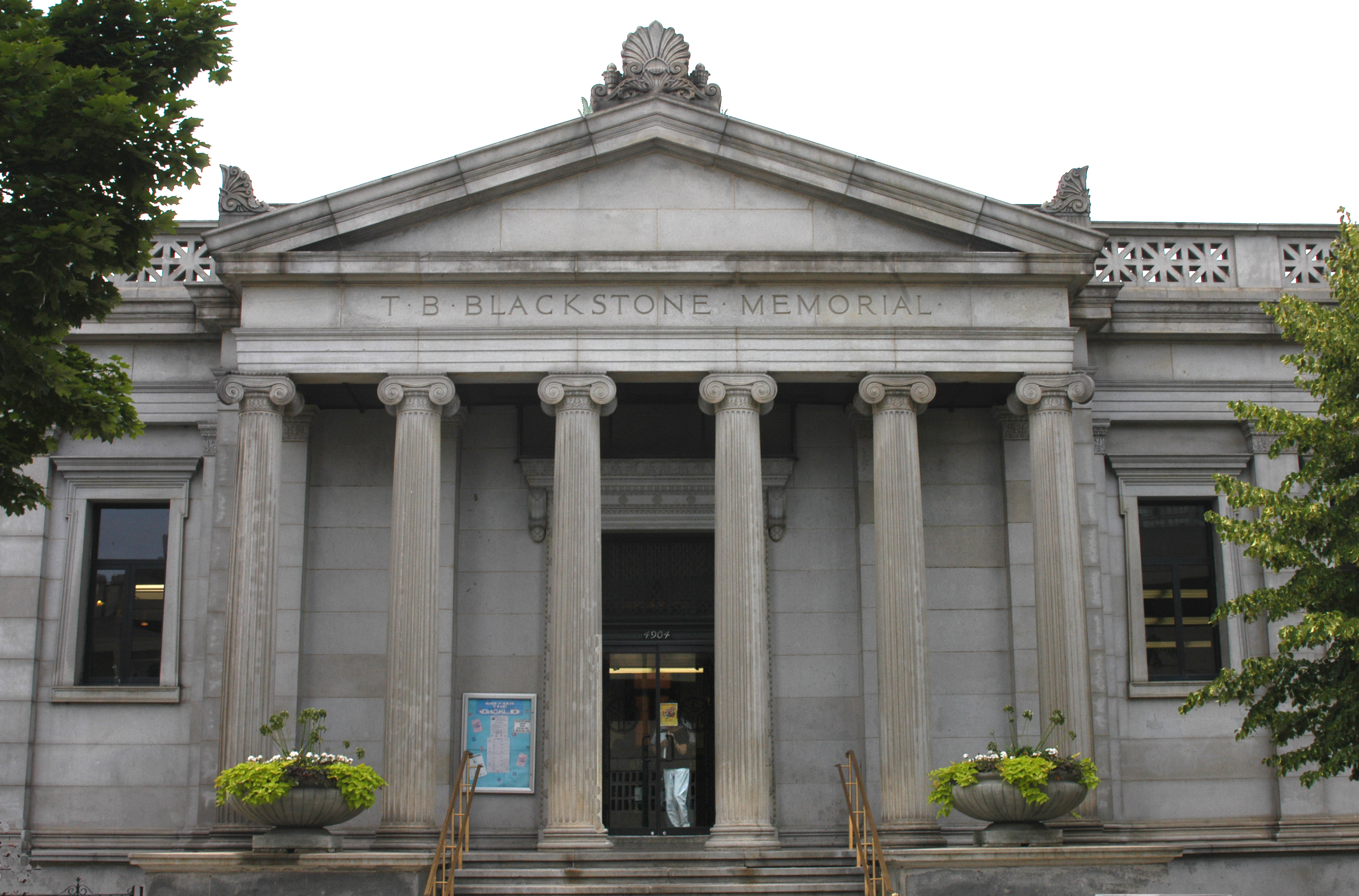
The exterior of the Blackstone Library in 2004

- The Blackstone Library was dedicated, marking the beginning of the Chicago Public Library system.
- Born:
  - Peter Arno (born Curtis Arnoux Peters, Jr.), American cartoonist; in New York City (d. 1968, emphysema)
  - Karl Brandt, German physician and Schutzstaffel officer; in Mulhouse, Alsace-Lorraine, German Empire (d. 1948, executed by hanging)
  - Tampa Red (born Hudson Woodbridge, later known as Hudson Whittaker), American Chicago blues musician; in Smithville, Georgia (date of birth uncertain; d. 1981)
  - Lev Zinder, Russian linguist; in Kiev, Russian Empire (d. 1995)
- Died: Orson W. Bennett, 62, American Union Army officer, Medal of Honor recipient

== January 9, 1904 (Saturday) ==
- Dervish movement (Somali): At Jidbali, Somaliland, 1000 Dervish were killed in battle with British forces under Lt. Gen. Charles Egerton.
- In Wayne County, West Virginia, near Cassville, 6 men were killed and 14 injured in a dynamite explosion on the extension of the Norfolk and Western Railway.
- Born:
  - Wilhelm Groth, German physical chemist; in Hamburg (d. 1977)
  - Giorgio La Pira, Italian politician and human rights activist, Mayor of Florence; in Pozzallo, Ragusa, Sicily (d. 1977)
- Died:
  - Charles Foster, 75, American politician, member of the United States House of Representatives from Ohio, Governor of Ohio and Secretary of the Treasury, died of cerebral hemorrhages.
  - John Brown Gordon, 71, American general and politician, 53rd Governor of Georgia, died of stomach and liver congestion.
  - Hannah Lynch, 44, Irish translator, died of a stomach ailment.
  - Alfred Richards, 36, South African Test cricketer and rugby union player, died of typhoid fever.
  - William W. Skiles, 54, American lawyer and politician, member of the United States House of Representatives from Ohio, died from pneumonia.
  - Thomas E. Stewart, 79, American lawyer, member of the United States House of Representatives from New York
  - Francis Wayland III, 78, American judge and politician, Lieutenant Governor of Connecticut and dean of the Yale Law School, died of acute bronchitis.

== January 10, 1904 (Sunday) ==
- The members of the Swedish Antarctic Expedition returned to Stockholm, Sweden.
- The New York Times reported that a volcanic eruption on Sugarloaf Mountain in Rowan County, Kentucky was producing large amounts of smoke. On February 4, The Bee, an Earlington, Kentucky newspaper, would report that the smoke was actually from a moonshining plant.
- Born:
  - Zoltán Bitskey, Hungarian Olympic swimmer; in Zvolen, Austria-Hungary (d. 1988)
  - Ray Bolger, American actor, singer and dancer, best known for his role in The Wizard of Oz; in Dorchester, Massachusetts (d. 1987, bladder cancer)
  - Gonzalo Curiel, Mexican film score composer; in Guadalajara, Jalisco (d. 1958, myocardial infarction)
- Died:
  - Georgina Jane Burgess, 62–68, New Zealand hotelkeeper, midwife and postmistress
  - Christian August Friedrich Garcke, 84, German botanist
  - Jean-Léon Gérôme, 79, French painter and sculptor, died of cerebral congestion.
  - Antoinette Sterling, 62, American contralto singer

== January 11, 1904 (Monday) ==
- Born:
  - Murray Alper, American actor; in New York City (d. 1984)
  - Alfred Kieffer, Luxembourgian Olympic footballer; in Rumelange (d. 1987)
- Died:
  - John Y. Brown, 68, American politician, member of the United States House of Representatives from Kentucky, Governor of Kentucky
  - William Sawyer, 88, Quebec politician

== January 12, 1904 (Tuesday) ==
- The Herero Wars in German South West Africa began.
- At Lake St. Clair, Michigan, Henry Ford set a new automobile land speed record of 91.371 mph (147.047 km/h).
- Born:
  - Sjef van Run, Dutch Olympic footballer; in 's-Hertogenbosch (d. 1973)
  - Fred McDowell, American singer-songwriter; in Rossville, Tennessee (d. 1972)
  - Yi Eungro, Korean-born French painter; in Hongseong County, South Chungcheong Province (d. 1989)
- Died:
  - John Harris Browne, 86, English Australian explorer and pastoralist
  - Latimer Neville, 6th Baron Braybrooke, 76, British peer, clergyman and academic
  - Oreste Sindici, 75, Italian-born Colombian composer who composed the music for the National Anthem of Colombia, died of arteriosclerosis.

== January 13, 1904 (Wednesday) ==
- As part of the modernization of the Chinese educational system, a group of advisers which included Zhang Zhidong proposed abolishing the imperial examinations.
- A fire which was apparently deliberately set destroyed the Platt City Jail in Birmingham, Alabama, killing 5 people and allowing 20 prisoners to escape.
- The entire business district of Havre, Montana, was destroyed by a fire which started shortly after midnight, seemed to have been put out at daybreak but reemerged 5 hours later, having been smoldering underneath a sidewalk. The fire caused $350,000 in damage but no deaths.
- In Reevesville, South Carolina, an African American man known as General Lee, who had been arrested for criminal assault because he had allegedly knocked on a white woman's door, was lynched by a white mob. The woman, who knew Lee, never claimed that she thought he was the person who knocked on her door.
- In Sussex County, Virginia, an African American man named Elmore Moseley (or Elmo Mosley) was acquitted of the December 1903 murder of Allen Fields, also African American, but was then lynched by an African-American mob. No one would be indicted for Moseley's lynching.
- In Tallula, Mississippi, an African American man named Butch Riley was lynched for allegedly having murdered C. C. McMillan the previous night.
- At least 8 workers were killed in an elevator accident at the Brown Shoe Company building in St. Louis, Missouri. Seven of the dead were boys between 12 and 15 years old.
- Born:
  - Richard Addinsell, British composer; in London (d. 1977)
  - Jean de Beaumont, French journalist, politician, World War II fighter pilot and Olympic sport shooter and skeleton competitor; in Château de Berg, Paris (d. 2002)
  - Anton Besold, German politician; in Weßling (d. 1991)
  - Jaakko Friman, Finnish Olympic speed skater; in Tampere (d. 1987)
  - Fausto Guerzoni, Italian film actor; in Nonantola, Emilia-Romagna (d. 1967)
  - József Hátszeghy, Hungarian Olympic foil fencer; in Arač, Austria-Hungary (d. 1988)
  - Oliver Messel, English artist and stage designer; in London (d. 1978)
  - Nathan Milstein, Russian-born American violinist; in Odessa, Russian Empire (d. 1992, heart attack)
  - Ewa Olliwier, Swedish Olympic diver; in Stockholm (d. 1955)
  - Dick Rowley (born William Richard Rowley), Irish professional footballer and Royal Air Force officer; in Enniskillen (d. 1984)
  - Jacqueline Zadoc-Kahn Eisenmann (born Jacqueline Zadoc-Kahn), French physicist; in the 8th arrondissement of Paris (d. 1998)
- Died:
  - Charles Harvey Denby, 73, American Union Army officer and diplomat, died of heart failure.
  - Samuel G. Havermale, 79, American Methodist minister, died of heart disease and dropsy.

== January 14, 1904 (Thursday) ==
- In High Springs, Florida, an African American man named Jumbo Clark was lynched for allegedly having attacked a white girl of about 14 on her way to school. The lynch mob consisted of 50 men, none of whom wore masks.
- The Wright brothers wrote to patent attorney Harry Aubrey Toulmin Sr. for an appointment concerning patenting their flying machine.
- In Dallas, Texas, businessman William C. McCahan was found shot to death in his office chair after what appeared to have been an informal pistol duel with his former business partner, J.M. Chappell. Chappell was wounded in the temple, scalp and left ear.
- In Golden Gate Park, San Francisco, a baby bear, reportedly the first grizzly bear ever born in captivity, was born in the early morning to the park's bear couple, Mr. and Mrs. Monarch. At 4 p.m. the same day, water was introduced for the first time into the new Model Yacht Lake, pumped by the Dutch Windmill. San Francisco Parks Commission president Adolph B. Spreckels and Golden Gate Park superintendent John McLaren supervised the adjustment of the valve. The baby grizzly bear would die on the night of January 16.
- Born:
  - Henri-Georges Adam, French engraver and sculptor; in Paris (d. 1967, heart attack)
  - Cecil Beaton, English photographer, scenic designer and costume designer; in Hampstead, London (d. 1980)
  - Hector Grey (born Alexander Thomson Scott), Scottish street trader and company director; in Bowling, West Dunbartonshire (d. 1985)
  - Babe Siebert (born Charles Albert Siebert), Canadian National Hockey League left winger and defenceman; in Plattsville, Ontario (d. 1939, drowning)
  - Ernst Wellmann, highly decorated German Army officer; in Samter, West Prussia (d. 1970)
- Died: Henry W. Lander, 77, American lawyer and politician, died of pneumonia.

== January 15, 1904 (Friday) ==
- Born:
  - Gunnar Åström, Finnish international footballer; in Oulu (d. 1951)
  - Jim Bowdoin, American National Football League guard; in Coffee Springs, Alabama (d. 1969)
  - Harold Jefferson Coolidge Jr., American zoologist; in Boston, Massachusetts (d. 1985, complications after a fall)
  - Eddie DeLange (born Edgar DeLange Moss), American bandleader and lyricist; in Long Island City, New York City (d. 1949)
  - William Findlay, Scottish American Olympic and professional soccer player; in Kilmarnock, East Ayrshire (d. 1981)
  - Willy van Zwieteren, Dutch footballer; in Rotterdam (d. 1983)
- Died:
  - Asa S. Bushnell, 69, American businessman and politician, Governor of Ohio, died of apoplexy.
  - Eduard Lassen, 73, Belgian-Danish composer and conductor

== January 16, 1904 (Saturday) ==
- Born:
  - Dorothy Eady, British archaeologist, Egyptologist and folklorist; in Blackheath, London (d. 1981)
  - František Kratochvíl, Czech Olympic wrestler; in Libodřice, Czechoslovakia (d. 1995)
- Died:
  - Lyman E. Barnes, 48, American lawyer and politician, member of the United States House of Representatives from Wisconsin
  - Thomas B. Woodworth, 62, American newspaper publisher and lawyer

== January 17, 1904 (Sunday) ==
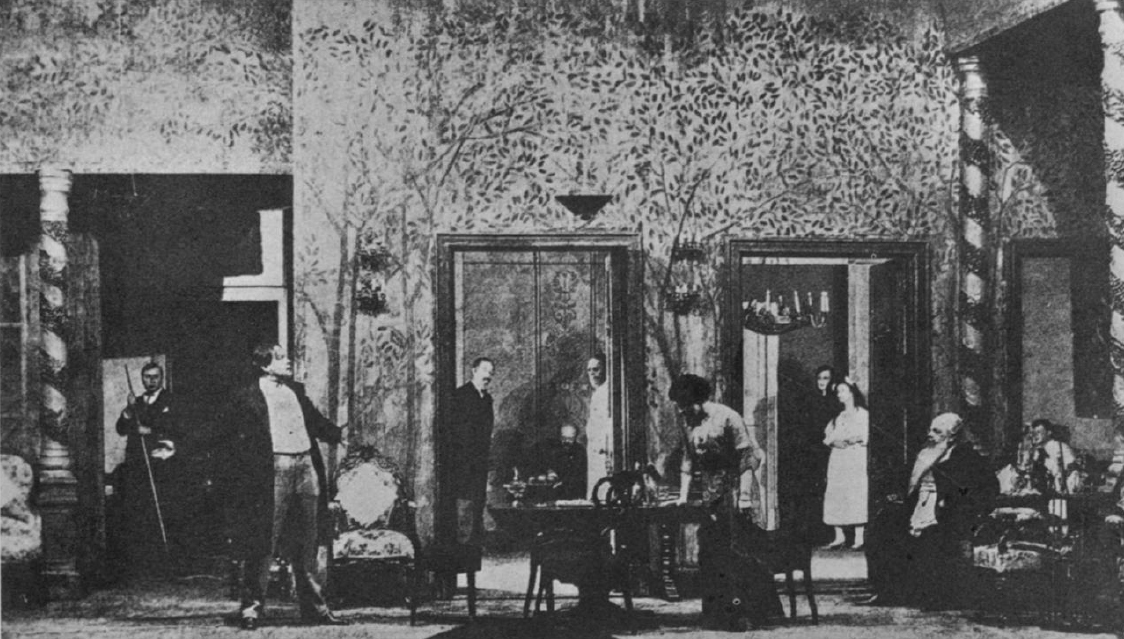
Scene from Act 3 in The Cherry Orchard (1904 Moscow Art Theatre production)

- Anton Chekhov's play The Cherry Orchard received its premiere performance at the Moscow Art Theatre.
- In Bloemfontein, Orange River Colony, a reservoir burst, drowning about 60 people, destroying 179 buildings, and leaving hundreds homeless.
- Born:
  - Jack Acland (born Hugh John Dyke Acland), New Zealand politician; in Christchurch (d. 1981)
  - André Blusset, French Olympic cross-country skier; in Villard-de-Lans, Isère (d. 1994)
  - Glenn Graham, American Olympic pole vaulter; in Los Angeles, California (d. 1986)
  - Patsy Ruth Miller (born Ruth Mae Miller), American actress; in St. Louis, Missouri (d. 1995)
  - Hem Vejakorn, Thai artist and writer; in Phrarajavang, Phra Nakhon District, Bangkok (d. 1969)
- Died:
  - The Honourable Sir Henry Keppel GCB, OM, 94, Royal Navy Admiral of the Fleet
  - Joseph Nirschl, 80, German Roman Catholic theologian
  - William Tobin, 44, English-born Australian cricketer

== January 18, 1904 (Monday) ==
- In France, fencer Jean Stern and poet Robert de Montesquiou fought a duel with swords over critical comments Montesquiou had made about Stern's wife. Montesquiou was wounded, but not seriously.
- Associate Justice Oliver Wendell Holmes Jr. delivered the United States Supreme Court's decision in the case of Rogers v. Alabama, reaffirming the Court's previous ruling in Carter v. Texas that the exclusion of African Americans from grand juries in cases with African American defendants violated the Fourteenth Amendment to the United States Constitution.
- In Findlay, Ohio, a fire completely destroyed the Turners' Opera-House, causing $40,000 in damage.
- In North Dayton, Ohio, a fire that started in the basement destroyed the Allan School. A man who was working in the basement was reported missing and believed to have been killed. Only one of the school's 800 students died, a disabled child named Edna Baum who was trampled to death during the evacuation.
- Born:
  - Boris Babochkin, Soviet actor and director; in Saratov, Saratov Governorate, Russian Empire (d. 1975, heart attack)
  - Anthony Galla-Rini, American accordionist and composer; in Manchester, Connecticut (d. 2006, heart attack)
  - Cary Grant (born Archibald Alec Leach), English actor; in Horfield, Bristol (d. 1986, stroke)
  - John Axel Nannfeldt, Swedish botanist and mycologist; in Trelleborg (d. 1985)
- Died:
  - Sandford Arthur Strong, 40, English orientalist and art historian
  - George Francis Train, 74, American entrepreneur and adventurer, died of heart disease subsequent to nephritis.

== January 19, 1904 (Tuesday) ==
- In Princeton, New Jersey, Maria Louisa Bustill, the mother of Paul Robeson, received fatal burn injuries while cleaning her living room when a hot coal from the stove set fire to her dress.
- In his inaugural address as Governor of Mississippi, James K. Vardaman commented, "You can scarcely pick up a newspaper whose pages are not blackened with the account of an unmentionable crime committed by a negro brute, and this crime, I want to impress upon you, is but the manifestation of the negro's aspiration for social equality, encouraged largely by the character of free education in vogue, which the State is levying tribute upon the white people to maintain." Governor Vardaman also urged Americans to demand that the Fifteenth Amendment to the United States Constitution be repealed.
- At the East Gray Rock mine in Montana, a cave-in killed four miners.
- In Walla Walla, Washington, the Walla Walla Commercial Club received word that the United States Secretary of War had decided to close Fort Walla Walla once the Boise, Idaho barracks were enlarged.
- Due to a large number of cases of smallpox in Oakland, California, and elsewhere in the state, N. K. Foster, the Secretary of the California State Board of Health in Sacramento, ordered the Oakland Board of Education to ensure that all Oakland public school students provide certificates of vaccination.
- Born:
  - Gordon Beecher (born William Gordon Beecher, Jr.), American songwriter and United States Navy vice admiral; in Catonsville, Baltimore County, Maryland (d. 1973)
  - Ralph St. Germain, Canadian Olympic ice hockey player; in Ottawa, Ontario (d. 1974)
  - Leo Soileau, American Cajun musician; in Ville Platte, Louisiana (d. 1980)
- Died: John Selden Saunders, 67, Confederate States Army officer, Adjutant General of Maryland

== January 20, 1904 (Wednesday) ==
- The operetta Der Göttergatte, composed by Franz Lehár, received its world premiere at the Carltheater in Vienna.
- Pope Pius X issued the apostolic constitution Commissum Nobis, permanently abolishing the jus exclusivae, or "papal veto", previously exercised by certain Catholic countries over the election of a papal candidate they considered undesirable. The jus exclusivae had most recently been exercised by Austria against Cardinal Mariano Rampolla at the 1903 papal conclave.
- Alexander Graham Bell and Mabel Gardiner Hubbard arrived in New York City aboard the steamship Princess Irene with the body of James Smithson, which was transferred to the dispatch boat USS Dolphin for the journey to the Washington Navy Yard.
- Born:
  - Renato Caccioppoli, Italian mathematician; in Naples (d. 1959, suicide by gunshot)
  - Alfred Lindley, American lawyer, mountaineer, and Olympic champion rower; in Minneapolis, Minnesota (d. 1951, airplane crash)
- Died:
  - Maria Louisa Bustill, 50, American Quaker schoolteacher, mother of Paul Robeson, died from burn injuries she had suffered the previous day.
  - Achille Larose, 64, Quebec farmer and politician
  - Ferdinand Mannlicher, 55, German-Austrian co-inventor of the Mannlicher–Schönauer rifle
  - William Overall Yager, 70, Confederate States Army officer and Virginia politician

== January 21, 1904 (Thursday) ==
- The Korean Empire declared its neutrality in the oncoming Russo-Japanese War.

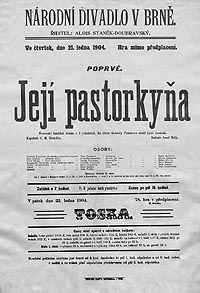
Poster for the premiere of Její pastorkyňa

- The opera Její pastorkyňa (Her Stepdaughter, better known as Jenůfa), composed by Leoš Janáček, received its world premiere in Brno.
- Born:
  - R. P. Blackmur, American literary critic and poet; in Springfield, Massachusetts (d. 1965)
  - Puck van Heel (born Gerardus Henricus van Heel), Dutch Olympic and professional footballer; in Rotterdam (d. 1984)
  - John Porter, Canadian Olympic champion ice hockey player; in Beckwith, Ontario (d. 1997)
  - Edris Rice-Wray Carson (born Edris Roushan Rice-Wray), American medical researcher; in Newark, New Jersey (d. 1990)
  - Wal Williams (born Walter George Williams), Australian rules footballer; in Scoresby, Victoria, Australia (d. 1982)
- Died:
  - Wilhelm Albers, 63, Bavarian American Union Army officer and politician, member of the Wisconsin State Assembly
  - Sir Frederick Seager Hunt, 1st Baronet, 65, British politician and distiller
  - Albert von Maybach, 81, German lawyer, politician and railway manager
  - James F. Stewart, 52, American lawyer, member of the United States House of Representatives from New Jersey

== January 22, 1904 (Friday) ==
- At 1 a.m., a tornado struck Moundville, Alabama, killing 38 people, injuring over 100, and destroying all but one business building in the town.
- In Bedford, Indiana, 22-year-old high school Latin teacher Sarah Catherine Schafer was found dead in a buggy shed near the boarding house where she lived, after being reported missing the previous evening. Her skull had been crushed with a paving brick, and her body had been dragged at least 60 feet (18 m) along an alley. A suspect would be tried and acquitted of Schafer's murder, but the case would never be solved.
- A railroad engineer and fireman were killed when a Canadian Pacific Railway train went out of control west of Field, British Columbia.
- Born:
  - George Balanchine (born Georgi Melitonovitch Balanchivadze), Russian-born American choreographer; in Saint Petersburg (d. 1983, pneumonia as a complication of Creutzfeldt–Jakob disease)
  - Mario Albertelli, Italian cinematographer; in Rome, Lazio (d. 1966)
  - Sigurd Anderson, Norwegian-born American politician, Governor of South Dakota; near Arendal (d. 1990)
  - Arkady Gaidar (born Arkady Petrovich Golikov), Russian children's writer and Red Army commander; in Lgov, Kursk Governorate (d. 1941, killed in action)
  - Leonard Williams (born Arthur Leonard Williams), British politician, Governor-General of Mauritius; in Birkenhead (d. 1972, heart attack)
- Died:
  - Edmund Andrews, 79, American surgeon and medical educator
  - Thomas Underwood Dudley, 66, American Episcopal prelate, Bishop of Kentucky, died of heart disease.
  - George Salmon FBA FRS FRSE, 84, Irish mathematician and Anglican theologian
  - Laura Vicuña, 12, Chilean Roman Catholic holy figure and blessed, died of pulmonary tuberculosis.

== January 23, 1904 (Saturday) ==
- The Ålesund fire, which broke out at 2 a.m., destroyed most buildings in the town of Ålesund, Norway, leaving about 10,000 people without shelter. Only one person died, a 76-year-old woman named Ane Heen.
- Shortly after midnight, the schooner Augustus Hunt was wrecked in heavy fog off Quogue, Long Island, New York, resulting in the deaths of eight of the ten men aboard. The crew of the nearby Quogue Life-Saving Station attempted to rescue the sailors, who were clinging to the wrecked vessel, but their boat was repeatedly driven back to shore by the surf, and lifelines thrown to the wreck fell short or wide. The wreck began breaking up after daylight, and at about noon the lifesavers were able to rescue two sailors, but continued hearing shouts from the wreck, which grew fainter through the afternoon before ceasing entirely.
- In Allentown, Pennsylvania, a jury acquitted Mrs. Catharine Bechtel of being an accessory before the fact in the October 1903 murder of her daughter, Mabel Bechtel.
- The protected cruiser USS Charleston (C-22) was launched at the Newport News Shipbuilding and Drydock Company in Newport News, Virginia.
- Born:
  - Danijel Premerl, Croatian Olympic and professional footballer; in Pregrada, Varaždin County, Kingdom of Croatia-Slavonia, Austria-Hungary (d. 1975)
  - Anya Seton (born Ann Seton), American historical novelist; in Manhattan, New York City (d. 1990)
  - Louis Zukofsky, American Objectivist poet; in New York City (d. 1978)
- Died:
  - Gédéon Bordiau, 71, Belgian architect
  - James Frederick Skinner Gordon, 82, Scottish Episcopalian priest and antiquarian

== January 24, 1904 (Sunday) ==
- Colonel Arthur Lynch, who had led the Second Irish Brigade against the British during the Second Boer War and had been serving a life prison sentence for treason in Ireland, was released "on license" at the request of King Edward VII.
- At an American-owned mine in the Zaruma gold mining district of Ecuador, a 75-foot (23 m) wall collapsed on 15 American miners, burying them alive.
- In Guthrie, Oklahoma Territory, an African American man named Lewis Radford was arrested for the murder of Priscilla Frozell, an African American woman, but was seized from jail that evening and lynched by an African American mob.
- Convicted murderer Ernest Cashel, who had escaped from his cell five days before his scheduled December 15, 1903 hanging, was recaptured at a farmhouse outside Calgary, Northwest Territories, Canada. He would be hanged on February 2.
- Born:
  - Jaap van de Griend, Dutch Olympic and professional footballer; in Vlaardingen (d. 1970)
  - Wivan Pettersson, Swedish Olympic swimmer; in Eskilstuna (d. 1976)
- Died:
  - Harry Bass, 51, English cricket groundsman, died of heart failure.
  - Edward William Davies, 48, former mayor of Fremantle, Western Australia, died of heart failure.
  - Frederick I, Duke of Anhalt, 72, died of an apoplectic stroke.
  - George William Lockhart, 54–55, British elephant trainer, was crushed to death by an elephant.
  - Juana López, about 58–59, Chilean War of the Pacific vivandière and nurse, died of endocarditis.

== January 25, 1904 (Monday) ==
- At 8:15 a.m., an explosion at the Harwick Mine in Cheswick, Pennsylvania killed at least 179 coal miners. At 6 p.m., a rescue party descended the mine's main shaft and discovered 17-year-old Adolph Gunia, who was severely burned but was the sole survivor of the explosion. Mining engineer Selwyn M. Taylor ventured further into the mine in search of more survivors but was asphyxiated by afterdamp, dying early the next day.
- The USS Dolphin arrived at the Washington Navy Yard with the remains of James Smithson, which Alexander Graham Bell presented to the Smithsonian Institution in a ceremony in the Great Hall of the Smithsonian Castle. Smithson then lay in state in the Regents' Room in the Castle's South Tower.
- Halford Mackinder read a paper on "The Geographical Pivot of History" at the Royal Geographical Society of London in which he formulated the Heartland Theory, originating the study of geopolitics.
- On the night of January 25–26, a fire at the Turin National University Library destroyed over 100,000 books and manuscripts.
- Born:
  - Ernst Blum, German international footballer; in Stuttgart (d. 1980)
  - Albert De Roocker, Belgian Olympic fencer; in Dendermonde (d. 1989)
  - Géza Frid, Hungarian-Dutch composer and pianist; in Máramarossziget, Máramaros County, Austria-Hungary (d. 1989)
- Died:
  - Sir Graham Berry, KCMG, 81, English-born Australian politician, Premier of Victoria, died of pneumonia.
  - William Chauncey Kibbe, 81, American soldier and educator, Adjutant General of California, died of tuberculosis.
  - Coates Kinney, 77, American lawyer, politician and poet, died of the grip.
  - Hoyt Sherman, 76, American banker, son of Charles Robert Sherman and brother of Charles Taylor Sherman, William Tecumseh Sherman and John Sherman

== January 26, 1904 (Tuesday) ==
- Fifteen miners were killed at the Stratton Independence Mine in Victor, Colorado, when the cable of the mine-shaft lift cage snapped, causing the cage to fall 1,500 feet (460 m) to the bottom of the shaft. The victims were non-union miners substituting for the Cripple Creek strikers.
- A major fire in Progreso, Yucatán, Mexico, destroyed an entire square and caused $2,000,000 in damage.
- Born:
  - Douglas Evans, American actor; in Madison, Virginia (d. 1968)
  - Otto Kässbohrer, German entrepreneur and vehicle manufacturer; in Ulm (d. 1989)
  - Ancel Keys, American scientist; in Colorado Springs, Colorado (d. 2004)
  - Donald Macintyre, Royal Navy officer and naval historian; in Dehra Dun, Uttarakhand, British India (d. 1981)
  - Seán MacBride, Irish statesman, recipient of the Nobel Peace Prize; in Paris, France (d. 1988)
  - Andrew Marton (born Endre Marton), Hungarian American film director; in Budapest (d. 1992)
  - Marcus Nikkanen, Finnish Olympic figure skater; in Helsinki, Grand Duchy of Finland, Russian Empire (d. 1985)
- Died:
  - Émile Deschanel, 84, French author and politician
  - Johannes Tak van Poortvliet, 64, Dutch politician
  - Grover S. Wormer, 82, American Union Army officer
  - Whitaker Wright (born James Whitaker Wright), 57, English businessman and confidence trickster, committed suicide by cyanide poisoning at the Royal Courts of Justice, Westminster, after his conviction for fraud.

== January 27, 1904 (Wednesday) ==
- Coal miner Daniel A. Lyle, who had arrived at the Harwick Mine on January 26 in response to a call for rescue workers, spent that afternoon and most of the night working in the mine. He returned early in the morning of January 27 to search for more victims, but, like Selwyn Taylor, was asphyxiated by afterdamp, leaving a widow and five children. The self-sacrifice of Taylor and Lyle would inspire industrialist and philanthropist Andrew Carnegie to establish the Carnegie Hero Fund.
- At Daytona Beach and Road Course in Florida, William Kissam Vanderbilt II set a new automobile land speed record of 92.308 mph (148.555 km/h) in a Mercedes automobile, surpassing the record Henry Ford had set on January 12.
- Irish poet William Butler Yeats gave a lecture at the Alhambra Theater in San Francisco, California, expressing the urgency of the revival of the Irish language. Yeats commented, "The Ireland of to-day is not the Ireland of yore. Before the famine you had the happy Ireland of jokes and music; after the famine you have the Ireland of tragedy... Gaelic Ireland is the Ireland of the centuries; English Ireland is the Ireland of the decades."
- In a match in Bellingham, Washington, American professional wrestler Tom Jenkins lost the American Heavyweight Championship to Frank Gotch by disqualification.
- Born:
  - James J. Gibson, American psychologist; in McConnelsville, Ohio (d. 1979)
  - Willie McLean, Scottish-born American soccer player; in Clydebank (d. 1977). McLean disappeared in 1938; in 2022, reporters for The Athletic discovered that he had died in 1977 after years in institutions.
- Died:
  - Julius Caesar Chappelle, 51–52, American politician, member of the Massachusetts General Court
  - John H. Hays, 59, American Union Army soldier, Medal of Honor recipient and police officer (Troy, Idaho Police Department), was shot to death by a domestic disturbance suspect.
  - Samuel Phillips Jackson, 73, English watercolor painter
  - Stephen Wright Kellogg, 81, American attorney and military officer, member of the United States House of Representatives from Connecticut
  - Annie Chambers Ketchum (born Annelizah Chambers), 79, American educator and writer (revision of "The Bonnie Blue Flag"), Tertiary of Saint Dominic
  - Robert Lowry, 79, member of the United States House of Representatives from Indiana

== January 28, 1904 (Thursday) ==
- German lawyer and future statesman Konrad Adenauer married his first wife, Emma Weyer, who would die in 1916.
- Arnold Comtesse, son of Swiss President Robert Comtesse, shot himself to death.

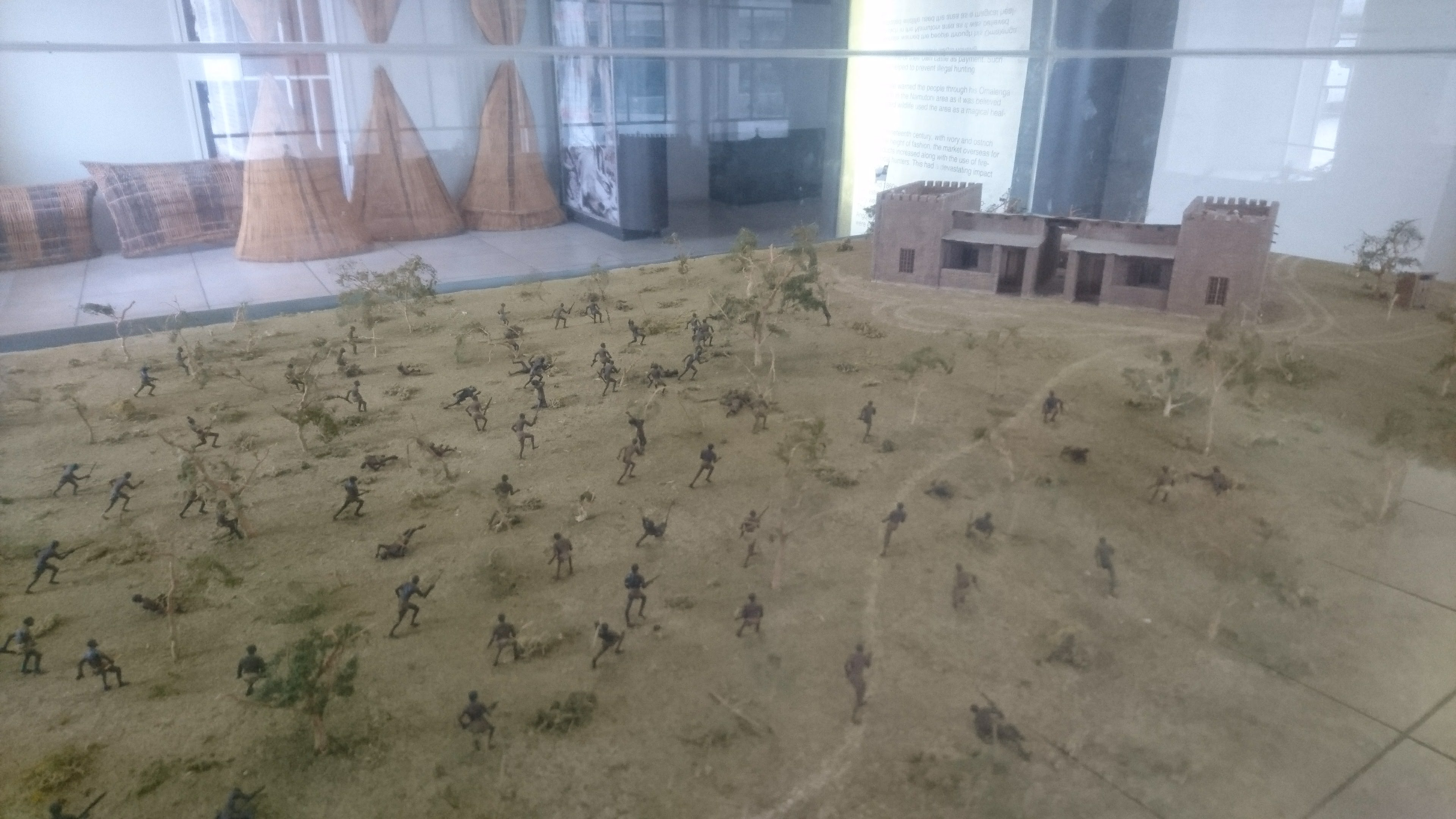
Diorama of the Battle of Namutoni

- At the Battle of Namutoni (part of the Herero Wars), 500 Ovambo warriors led by Ondonga chief Nehale Mpingana attacked Fort Namutoni in German South West Africa, which was held by seven German soldiers. At least 70 Ovambo warriors were killed.
- In Rognonas, France, a gas explosion in the Hotel de France's cafe killed 6 people and injured 14. One of the victims, the hotel proprietor's wife, had gone to the kitchen with a lighted candle to investigate a gas odor.
- At a League of Delaware dinner in Wilmington, "Negro disenfranchisement" was proposed as a Democratic Party slogan for the next campaign.
- Born:
  - Canuplin (born Canuto Francia), Filipino magician and bodabil entertainer; in Tondo, Manila (d. 1979)
  - Hans Heiberg, Norwegian journalist and literary critic; in Kristiania (d. 1978)
- Died:
  - Samuel Lightfoot Flournoy, 57, American lawyer, politician and businessman, died of throat and pulmonary illnesses.
  - Karl Emil Franzos, 55, Austrian novelist, died of heart disease.
  - Elphège Gravel, 65, Canadian Roman Catholic priest and bishop

== January 29, 1904 (Friday) ==
- The Västerås SK Fotboll club was founded in Västerås, Sweden.

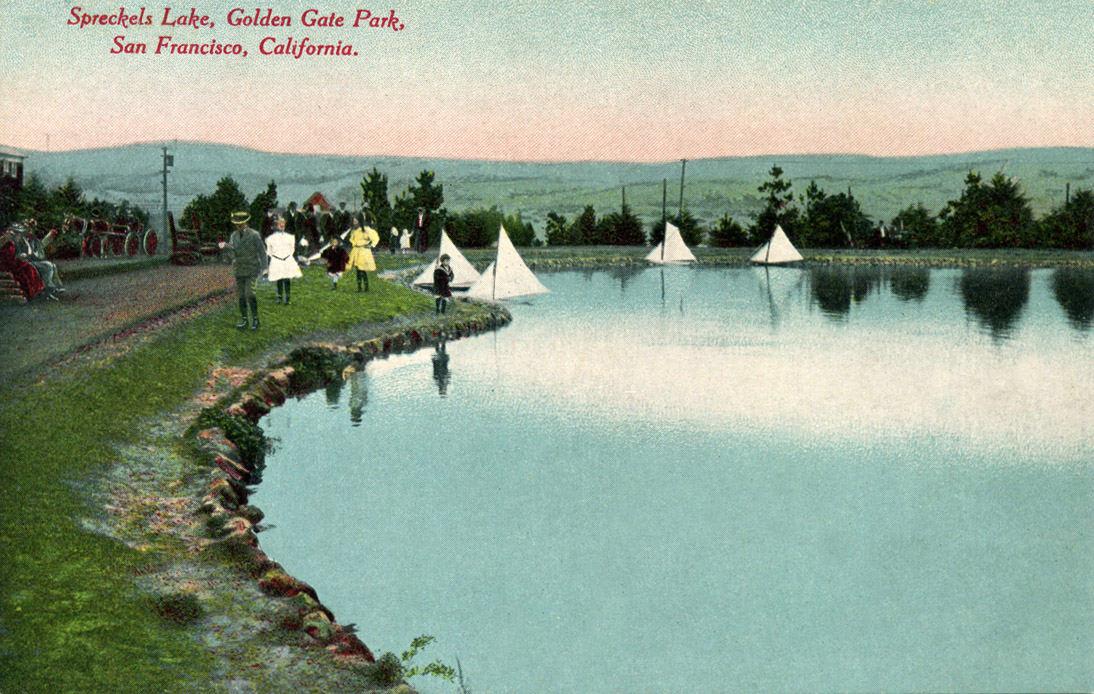
Postcard of Spreckels Lake, c. 1904—1906

- At a meeting of the San Francisco Board of Park Commissioners, the board named the new lake in Golden Gate Park "Spreckels Lake" in honor of Commission President Adolph Spreckels, "as he originated the enterprise and gave the work throughout his personal attention." The board voted for the new name over the objections of Spreckels, who had wanted the lake to be called the "Model Yacht Lake".
- In Oakland, California, author Herman Whitaker was found guilty of carrying a concealed weapon and fined. Poet George Sterling and other literary people were also present in the courtroom.
- Edith Roosevelt, the First Lady of the United States, hosted a musicale at the White House featuring a performance by pianist and composer Ferruccio Busoni.
- Born:
  - Arnold Gehlen, German philosopher; in Leipzig (d. 1976)
  - Lidia Zamenhof, Polish writer, translator and proponent of Esperanto and the Baháʼí Faith; in Warsaw, Congress Poland, Russian Empire (d. 1942, murdered at Treblinka extermination camp)
- Died: H. W. Briggs, 84, former member of the California State Assembly, died of apoplexy.

== January 30, 1904 (Saturday) ==
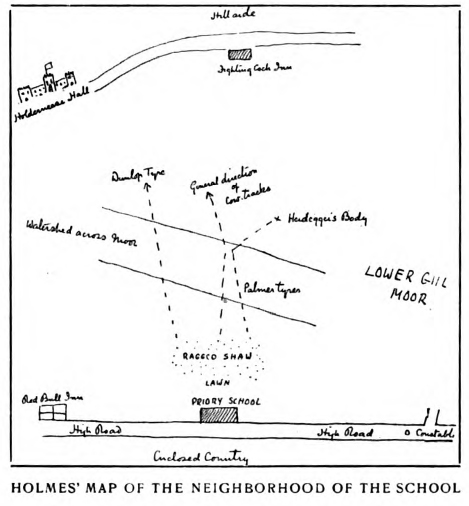
Map drawn by Sherlock Holmes in "The Adventure of the Priory School"

- The Sherlock Holmes short story "The Adventure of the Priory School" by Sir Arthur Conan Doyle was published for the first time in Collier's in the United States.
- At the Olympia London, Estonian professional wrestler George Hackenschmidt won the world championship in Greco-Roman wrestling, defeating Turkish wrestler Ahmed Madrali.
- Born: Aleksandrs Ābrams, Latvian footballer (d. 1958)
- Died:
  - John Davies (aka Gwyneddon), 71–72, Welsh printer and journalist
  - Józef Gosławski (a.k.a. Yosif Vikentevich Goslavski), 38, Polish architect, died of tuberculosis.
  - William Hearn, 54, English cricketer and Test umpire
  - Donald McDonald Mackay, about 58–60, Scottish-born Australian pastoralist and politician, member of the Western Australian Legislative Council
  - Phoebe Jane Babcock Wait (born Phoebe Jane Babcock), 65, American physician

== January 31, 1904 (Sunday) ==
- Firefighters Christopher Dressel, Arthur J. Renk and Peter J. Gaffeney of the New York City Fire Department suffered fatal smoke and gas inhalation while fighting a fire at the American Manufacturing Company in Brooklyn. Many other firefighters were also injured by smoke inhalation.
- Born:
  - Francesco Minerva, Italian Roman Catholic prelate, Archbishop Emeritus of Lecce; in Canosa di Puglia (d. 2004)
  - Max Sulzbachner, Swiss artist; in Basel (d. 1985)
- Died:
  - Henry Johnson, 53, United States Army Buffalo Soldier, Medal of Honor recipient
  - Dan Mahoney, 39, American Major League Baseball catcher, committed suicide by drinking carbolic acid.
