= Footy =

Footy or footie may refer to:

- Some forms of football:
  - Association football
  - Australian rules football
    - Rec footy
    - 9-a-side footy
    - The Footy Show (AFL)
  - Rugby league football
    - Touch footy
    - The Footy Show (rugby league)
  - Rugby Union
- Footy (model yacht), one-foot-long sailboat
- Footy, style of egg cup
- Footy, a.k.a. Blanket sleeper
- a short form of video footage.

== See also ==
- Footsie (disambiguation)
