= Juana López =

Juana López may refer to:

- Juana Evelyn López, Mexican footballer
- Juana López (nurse), Chilean vivandière during the War of the Pacific

== See also ==
- Juana Lopez Member, a calcareous sandstone
