= Model yacht =

Model yacht may refer to:

- Model yachting, the pastime of building and racing model yachts
- Ship model, scale representations of ships
