= San Francisco Model Yacht Club =

Model boat club in San Francisco

- Founded: 1898
- Type: Non-profit 501c7
- Headquarters: Clubhouse, Spreckels Lake
- Region served: San Francisco
- Members: c. 175
- Affiliations: American Model Yacht Association
- Website: sfmyc.org

The San Francisco Model Yacht Club (SFMYC) is a non-profit club dedicated to building and racing working model boats. It was founded in 1898 and has been continuously operating since. It is reportedly the longest-running model yachting organization in Northern America. It operates at Spreckels Lake which was created for the club in 1904, in San Francisco's Golden Gate park.

Model boats in the clubhouse

== History ==
Founded in 1898, the club coalesced from a group of affiliated model boat enthusiasts, including a number of socially-prominent and wealthy San Franciscans. It originally operated at Golden Gate Park's Stow Lake. While it was not the first model yacht club in the United States (Prospect Park Model Yacht Club in Brooklyn, New York, was founded in 1872), it is now the oldest, continuously operating model boating organization.

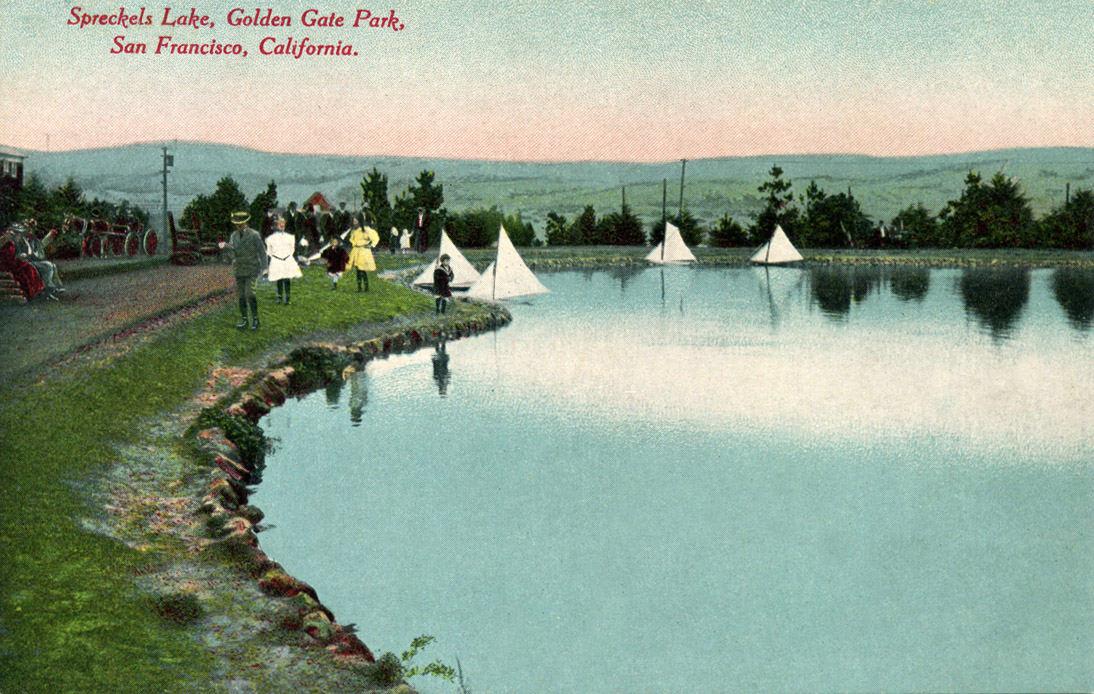
Vintage postcard of the northwest corner of Spreckels Lake, c1904/05

The San Francisco Model Yacht Club requested the creation of Spreckels Lake by the San Francisco Parks Commission between 1902 and 1904, as a lake dedicated specifically for model boat sailing and competition. The Parks Commission built the club's first clubhouse in 1909 from the remnants of the ‘little’ St. Francis Hotel near the Polo Fields. It assisted when the SFMYC raised the funds via private subscription for the Works Progress Administration (WPA) to build the current clubhouse closer to Spreckels Lake at the 'corner' of JFK Drive and 36th Ave in the late 1930s, using funds raised by the model yacht club itself with some additional funding from San Francisco. After completion in 1938, the federal government, via charter, deeded the clubhouse in perpetuity to the Model Yacht Club.

Race at Spreckels Lake in 2026

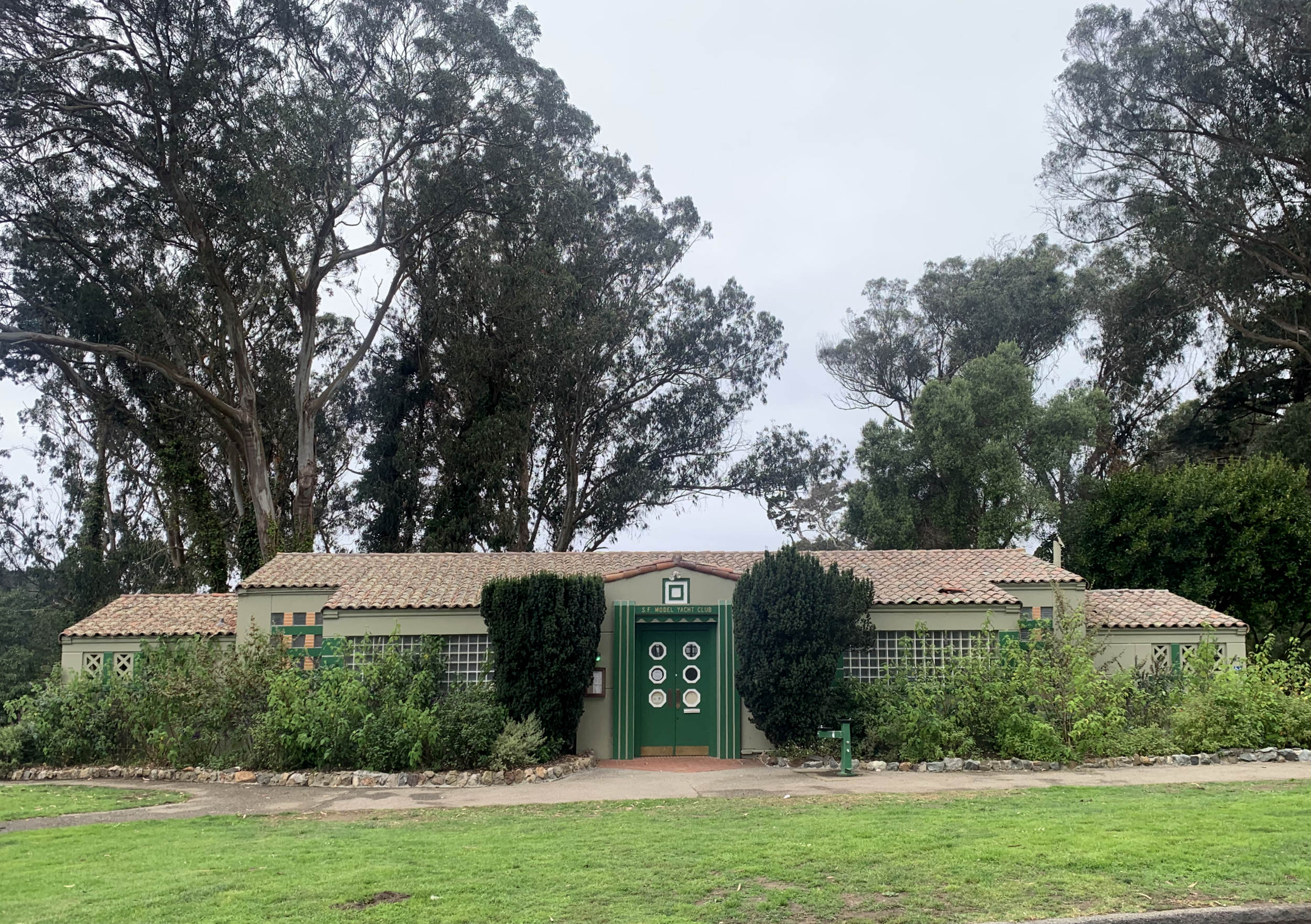
Clubhouse of the SF Model Yacht Club, built in 1937 as a WPA project. The clubhouse includes storage for model boats, restrooms, lockers and a repair workshop

== Activities ==
A California-incorporated 501(c)(7) non-profit since 1988, the San Francisco Model Yacht organizes races on certain weekdays and on weekends, and a parade every two years.

The club reports a membership of 175 in 2026. Due to an aging membership, they started a bottle yacht making program in 2021 to attract younger people and their families.

The club belongs to the American Model Yacht Association.

== See also ==
- Radio-controlled boat
- Model yachting
