= Model yachting =

Building and sailing model boats

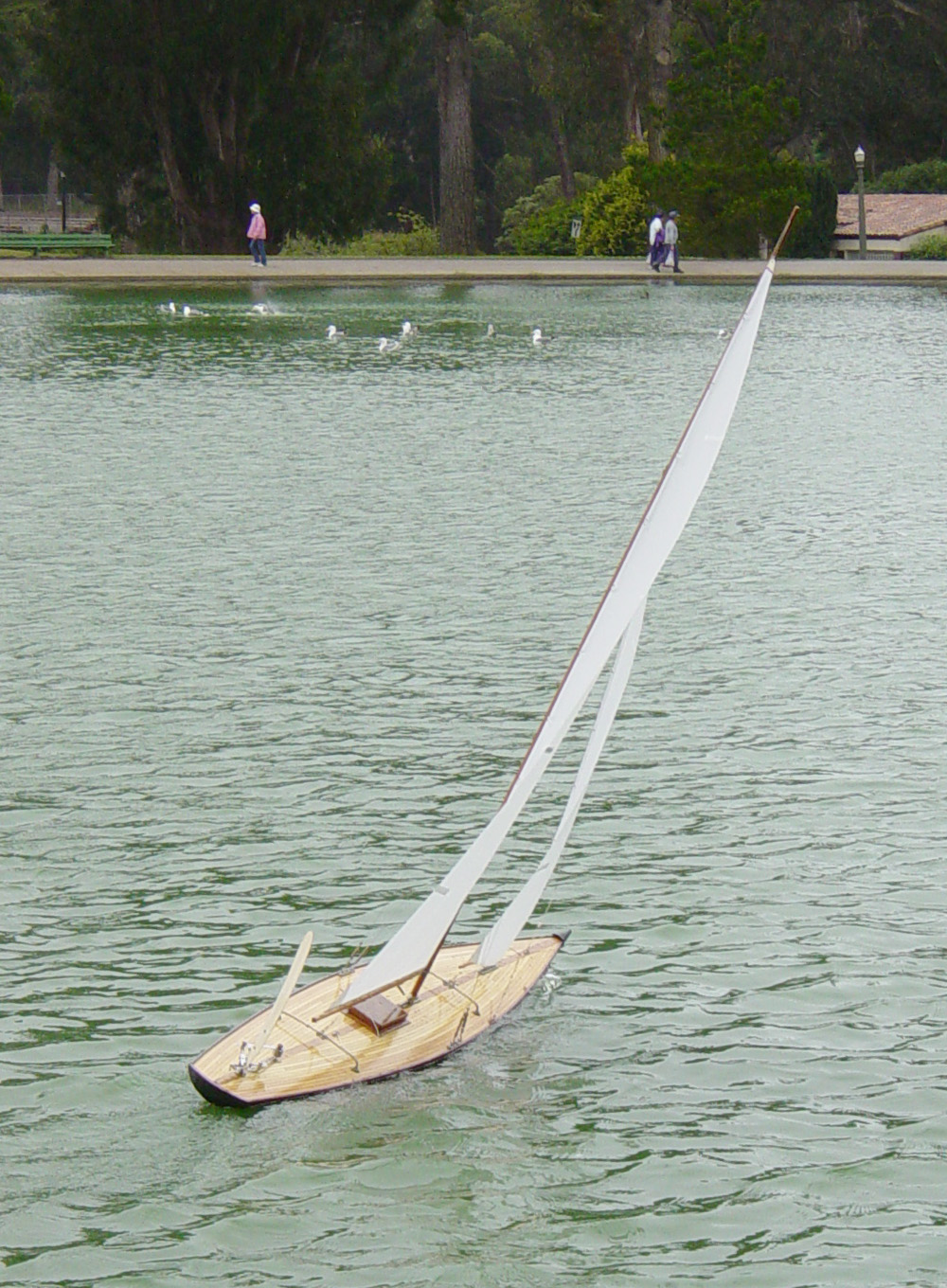
San Francisco Model Yacht Club X class (1000 square inches, few other restrictions), beating upwind under vane rudder control on Spreckles Lake in San Francisco's Golden Gate Park. The parameters of this class lead to visually pleasing designs with long hulls and long bow and stern overhangs.

Model yachting is the pastime of building and racing pond yachts. It has always been customary for ship-builders to make a miniature model of the vessel under construction, which is in every respect a copy of the original on a small scale, whether steamship or sailing ship. There are fine collections to be seen at both general interest museums such as the Victoria and Albert Museum in London and at many specialized maritime museums worldwide. Many of these models are of exquisite workmanship, every rope, pulley or portion of the engine being faithfully reproduced. In the case of sailing yachts, these models were often pitted against each other on small bodies of water, and hence arose the modern pastime. It was soon seen that elaborate fittings and complicated rigging were a detriment to rapid handling, and that, on account of the comparatively stronger winds in which models were sailed, they needed a greater draught. For these reasons modern model yachts, which usually have fin keels, are of about 15% or 20% deeper draught than full-sized vessels, while rigging and fittings have been reduced to absolute simplicity. This applies to models built for racing and not to elaborate copies of steamers and ships, made only for show or for "toy cruising."

== Model yacht clubs ==
Model yacht clubs have existed for many years in Great Britain, Ireland and the United States since the 1800s, most of them holding a number of regattas during each season. The rules do not generally require the owner or skipper of a model to build his own craft, but among model yachtsmen the designing and the construction of the boats constitute as important and interesting a part of the sport as the actual sailing.

== Sail–driven yachts ==
=== Construction and rigging ===
Traditional models are constructed of some light, seasoned wood, such as pine, preferably white pine, white cedar or mahogany free from knots. The hull may either be hollowed out of a solid block of wood, or cut from layers of planks in the so-called bread-and-butter style, or planked over a frame of keel and cross-sections. The first two methods are used in constructing dugout models. Hollowing out from the solid block entails a great deal of labor and has therefore fallen into disfavor. In the bread-and-butter style a number of planks, which have been shaped to the horizontal sections of the model and from which the middle has been sawn out, are glued together and then cut down to the exact lines of the design, templates being used to test the precision of the curves. In the planked, or built-up model, which is generally chosen by more expert builders, the planks are tacked to the frame, as in the construction of large vessels. Hulls may also be formed from modern plastics, which may be purchased from a manufacturer as thermomoldings or fiberglass layups or fabricated by the modeler, by first making a positive model from clay or plaster (or using an existing model's hull) and then creating a negative mold from fiberglass or plaster. Models may be exaggerated cutters, so far as their underbodies are concerned, or, more often, are fitted with fin-keels weighted, after the manner of full-sized yachts. They may have any rig, but schooner and sloop rigs are most common, the latter being the favorite for racing on account of its simplicity.

=== Mechanical sailing controls ===
For uncontrolled sailing craft some form of steering control is required, since with a fixed rudder position the model will turn into the wind. Three kinds of steering-gear are used, the weighted swinging rudder, the main-sheet balance gear, and the steering vane, the object of each being to keep the model on a true course, either before or against the wind. Models are often sailed without dynamic control of the rudder, but although a perfectly built boat will sail readily against the wind without steering gear, it is almost impossible to keep it on its course before the wind without some contrivance to check for divergence. The setting of the steering gear and sheet positions must be adapted to the wind conditions and this is a subtle art to master. These controls are the traditional methods, for more than 100 years before the advent of radio control and they continue to be used worldwide.

==== Weighted rudder method ====
This is accomplished by the weighted rudder, which falls over when the vessel heels and tends to counteract the force of the breeze. There are two varieties of the weighted rudder, in the first of which the weight, usually lead, is fixed to the edge of the rudder, while in the second the weight, usually a ball of lead, is made to run on the tiller above the deck, so that it can be placed further forward or aft, according to the force needed to overcome the influence of the wind. The weighted rudder is almost universal in the British Isles. Weights are also incorporated into the other, following methods.

==== Main sheet balance method ====
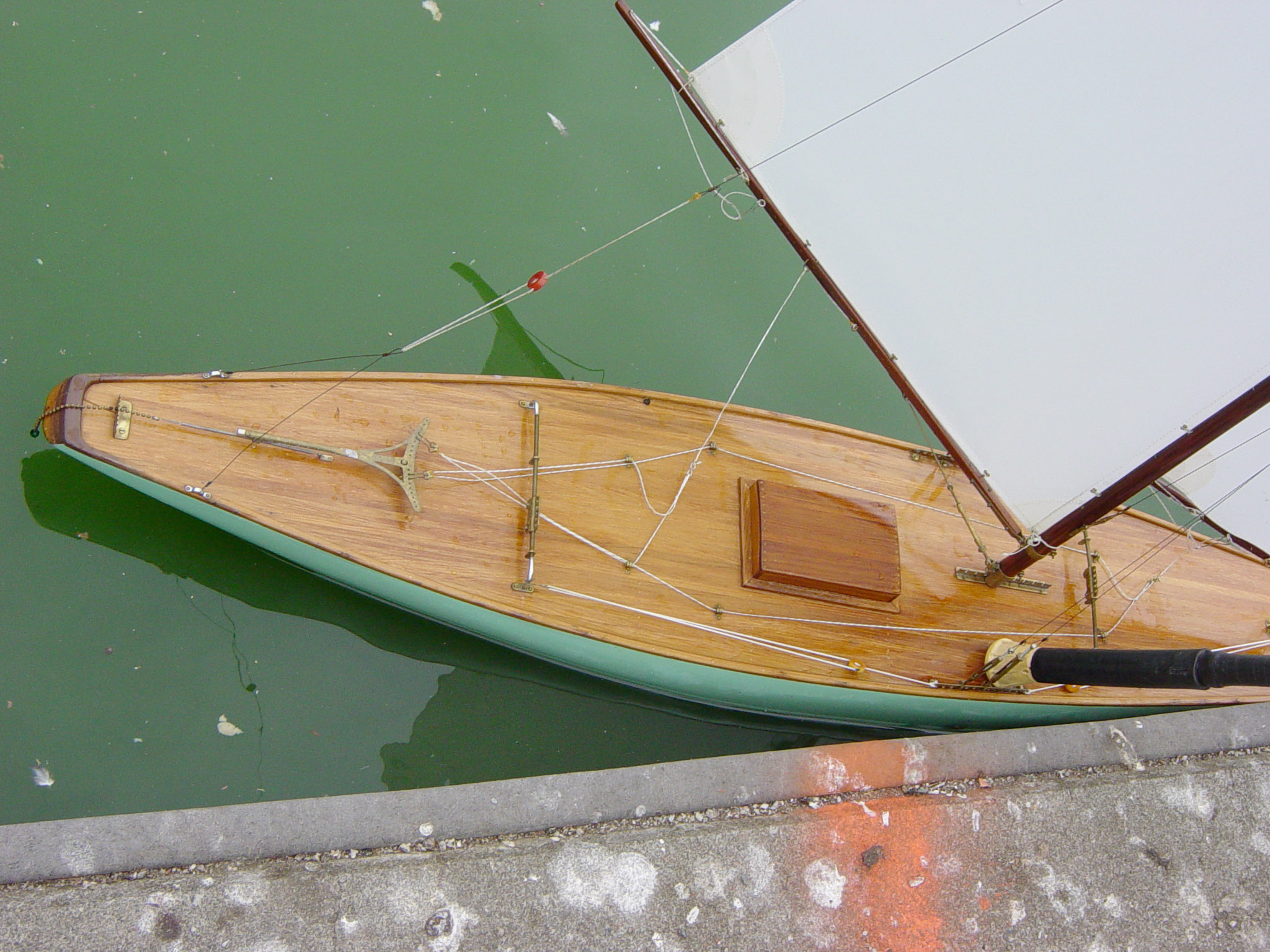
Main sheet mechanism

The preferred method in the United States uses the main-sheet balance gear, in which the boom is connected with the tiller in such a manner that, when it swings out with a pressure of wind, the rudder is automatically pulled round sufficiently to keep the yacht in its course. This will usually involve some sort of return spring so that the mechanism is responsive to the wind. This apparatus is particularly efficient in sailing before the wind. More modern, computer-based RC transmitters often have mixing circuitry integral to their design, that can "mix" the sheet-balancing, operated with a sail control servo, internally in the transmitter's computerized encoder unit, with the rudder control.

==== Wind vane method ====
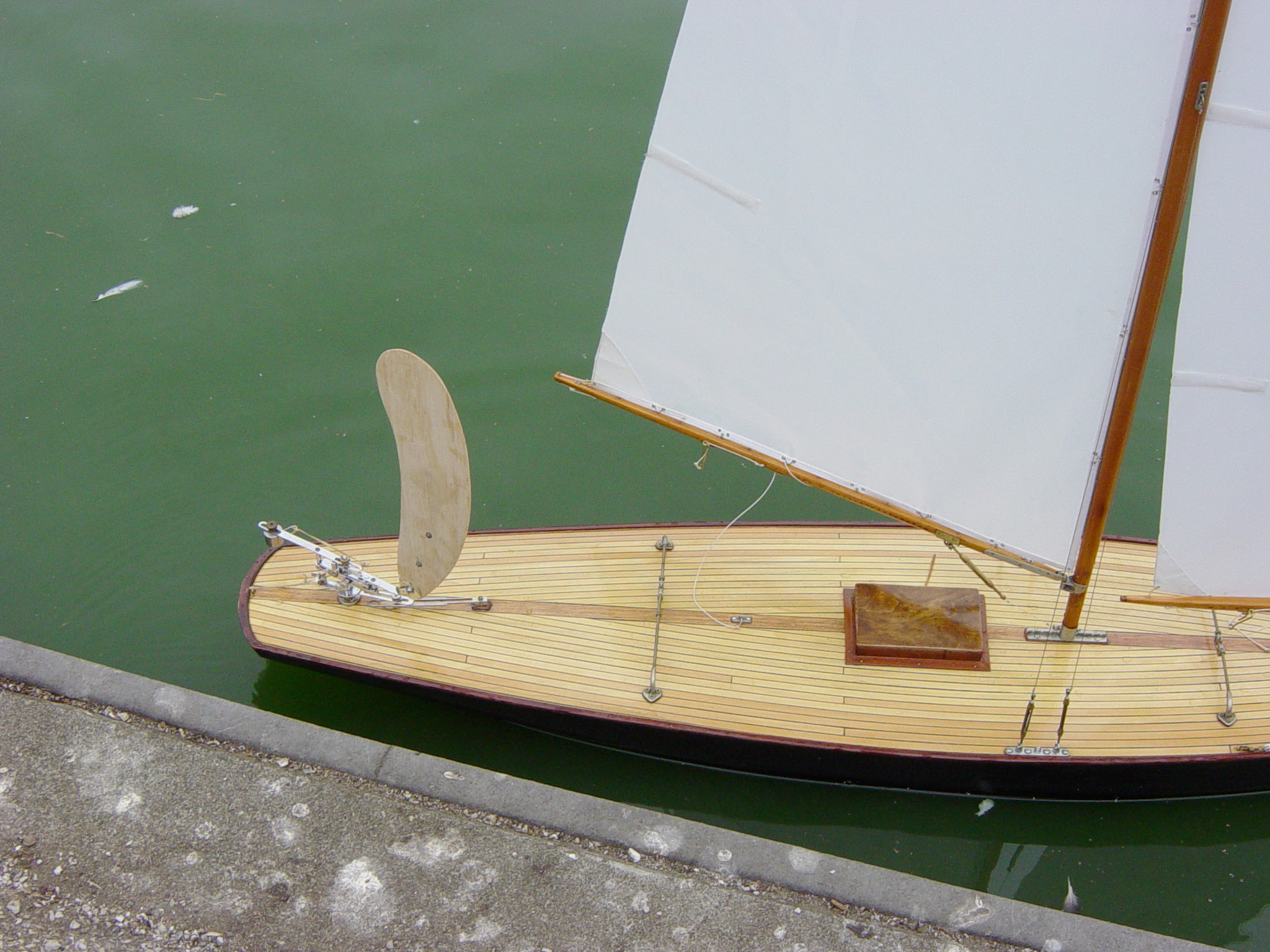
Vane mechanism

A more accurate method is to use a separate rudder vane; this is made from a plank of light wood such as balsa. The vane is operated in two principal positions, one for upwind sailing, the other for downwind. While some modelers object that the model craft will not be a plausible representation of its full-sized prototype, real long-distance cruising boats are frequently steered with dedicated windvanes of varying complexity (mechanical or electronic), occasionally with a line attached to a sheet, and never using weighted rudders.

=== Radio control ===
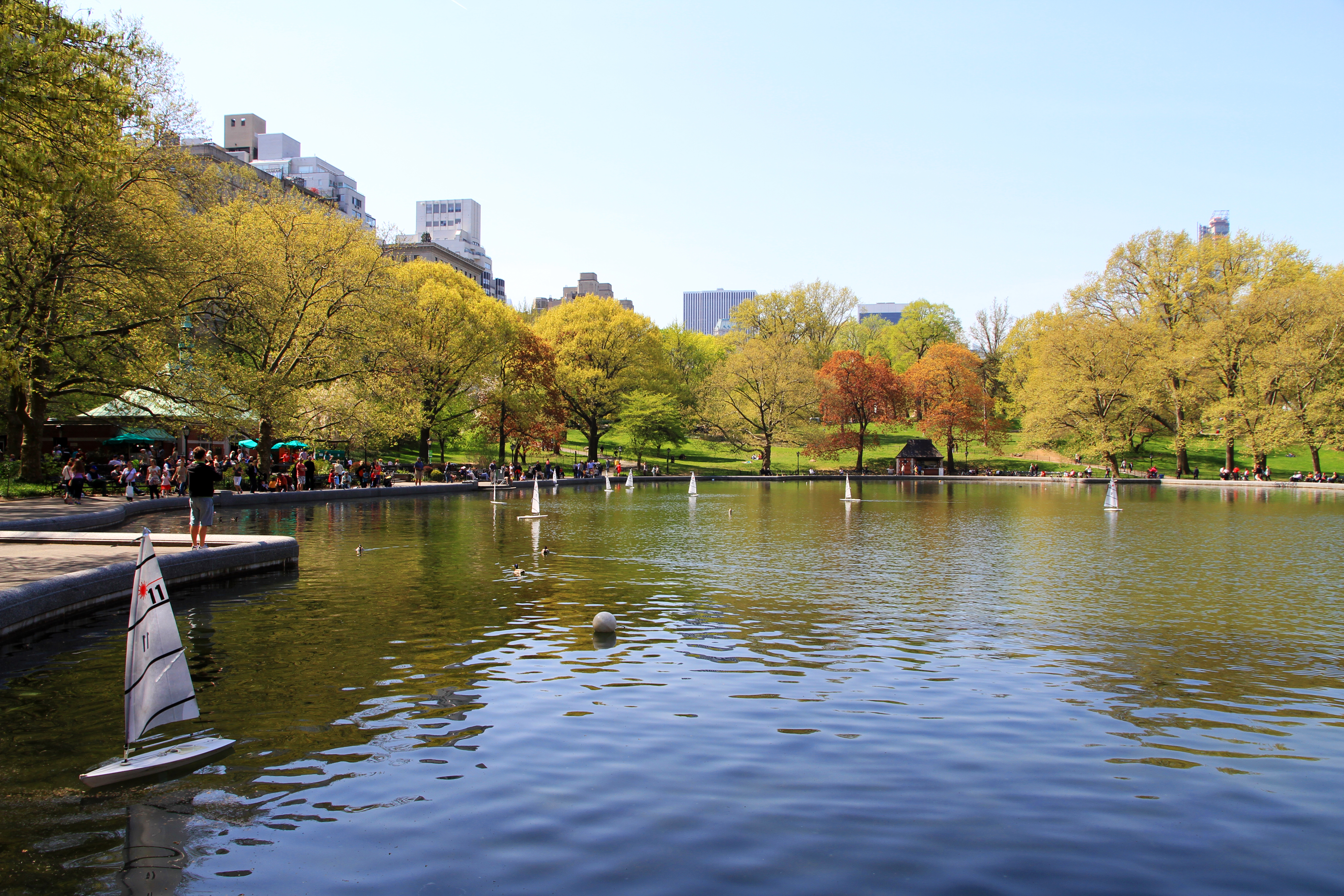
Radio-controlled model sailboats on Conservatory Water in Central Park in New York City

Radio control may be used in many locations. Typically two controls are provided for sailing yacht models, a general–purpose small servo for rudder control and a specialized sail winch to draw in the mainsheet and jib. Motorized craft control rudder and throttle, and perhaps other functions such as reversing, lighting, and mechanical novelties.

Other radio controlled watercraft hobbies include the operation and battle engagement of scale model warships (with gas-operated guns intended to sink opponents), and various high speed racing craft driven by powerful engines.

== Regattas ==
=== Model yacht basin regattas ===
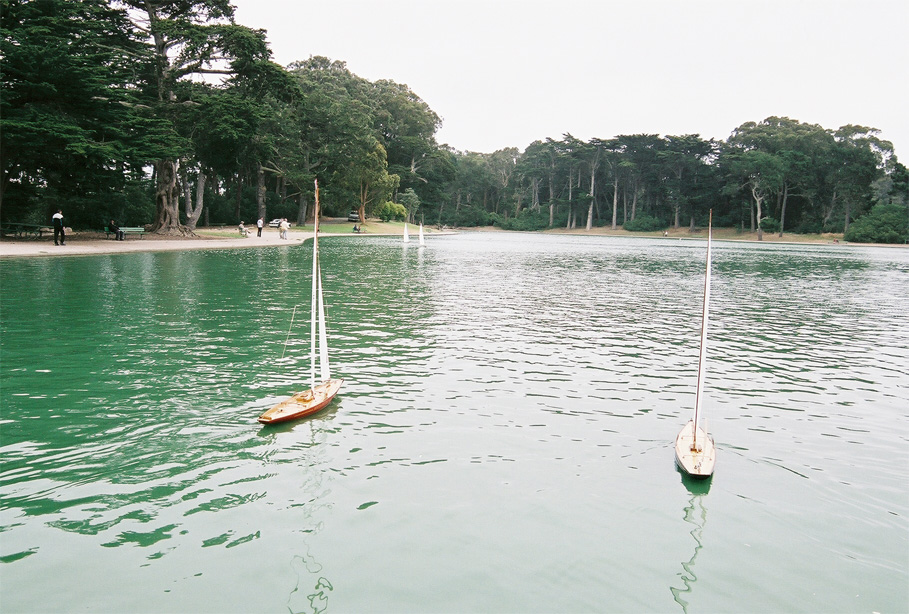
Here the boats are raced in pairs on a special-purpose (but naturalistically shaped) pond, with four SF X-class on the water.

These occur within a specialized pond or rectangular pool, in which a pole–person will walk down each side of the basin carrying a pole, prepared to push the yachts into an opposite tack before collision with the edge. The operators will usually work one side and a single turner, called a "Liverpool boy" will work the opposite side. In some locations the yachts are adjusted so that they will change tack at some point and so allowing the craft to be operated from one side of a wide pond.

=== Open water regattas ===
They take place upon sufficiently large bodies of water to allow a course at least a quarter of a mile in length, which is generally sailed twice or three times over to windward and backward. Triangular courses are also sailed. Racing rules correspond generally to those controlling regattas of large boats, and there is full scope to exhibit all the proofs of good seamanship. The yachts are followed in light skiffs, and may not be touched more than a certain number of times during a race, on penalty of a handicap. Racing measurements differ in the various clubs, but all are based upon length and sail-area. In Great Britain the regular Yacht Racing Association rule has been generally adopted, and handicaps deducted from it. In America models are divided into a single schooner with a maximum load water-line of 63 inches, and three classes of sloops, the first class including yachts with water-lines between 48 and 53 inches, the second class those between 42 and 48 inches and the third and smallest class those between 35 and 42 inches A yacht with a shorter water line than 35 inches must race in the third class. It was previously found that yachts of smaller dimensions possessed too little resistance to the wind. However, model development means that the tiny Footy class - 12 " long and a boat in your briefcase - is now recognised by the Model Yachting Association in Britain and the American Model Yachting Association in the United States as well as being sailed in such countries as New Zealand, Canada, Malta, Sweden, Belgium, Brazil and Denmark.

== Powered yachts and scale working craft ==
With the advent of radio control it has become much more practical to operate motorized craft. While some are powered by water-cooled internal combustion engines and can be very powerful and fast, the noise and fast operation is discouraged in many park settings as too disturbing to patrons, waterfowl and other wildlife. Electric power and low pressure steam engines are popular, with many amateur machinists building engines from casting kits. Specialized regattas for radio-controlled motorized craft are held that include rubber duck herding and the simulated rescue of ships in distress by a team of operators controlling a pair of tugboats.

== See also ==
- Hobby
- Ship model
- Wooden Ship Models
- Radio-controlled boat
- Liquid Robotics
- Two foot skiff also known as ‘Balmain Bugs’ were model racing skiffs, typically raced on Sydney Harbour between the 1890s and 1950s.
