= Two foot skiff =

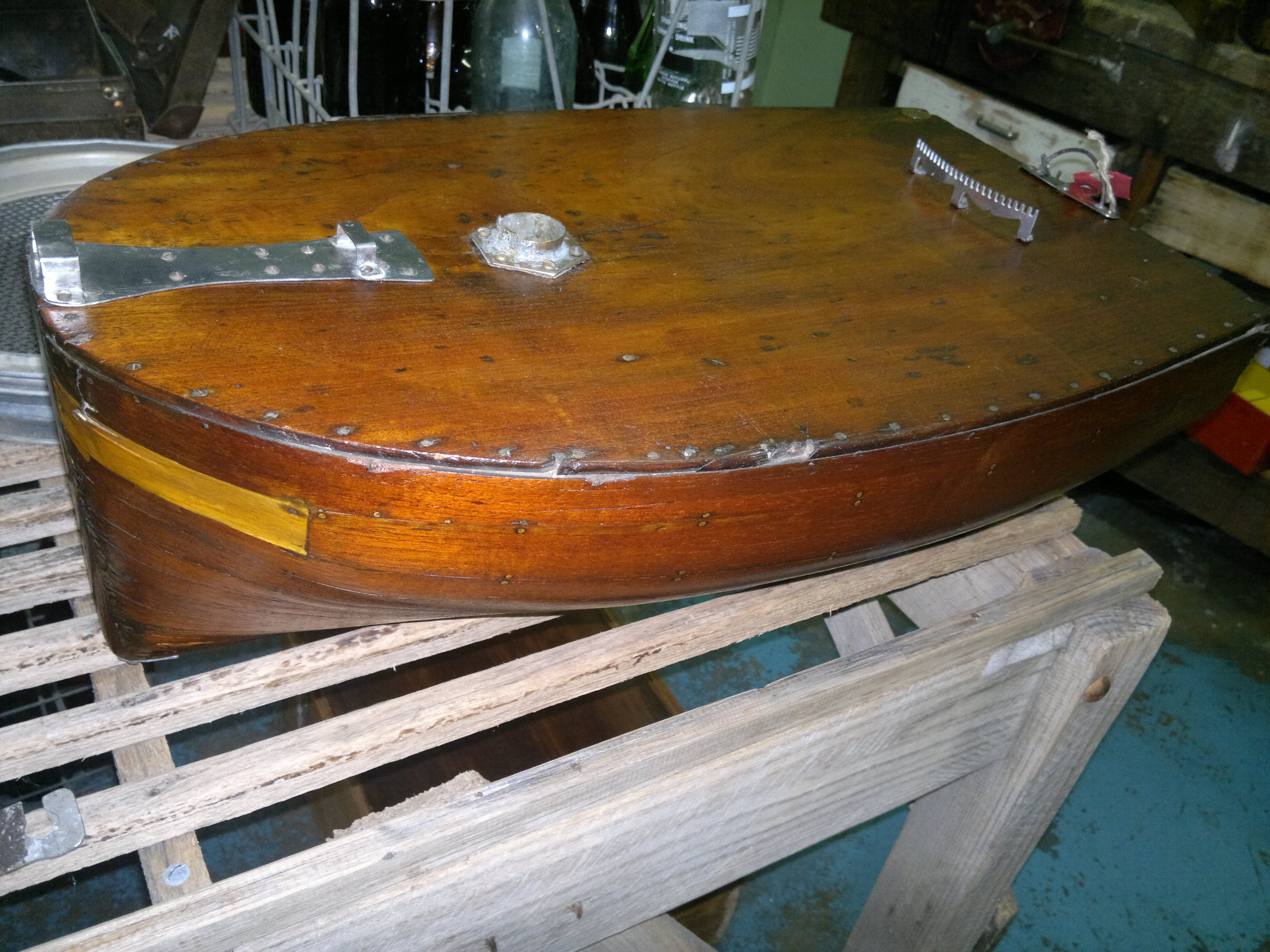
Hull of a Two Foot Skiff

Two foot skiffs also known as ‘Balmain Bugs’ were model racing skiffs typically raced on Sydney Harbour between the 1890s and 1950s. The model skiffs were crafted by shipwrights in their spare time. In the sports hey days the 1940s and 1950s there were up to 10 clubs at Abbotsford, Drummoyne, Balmain, North Sydney and Double Bay. They raced with large rigs including four foot bowsprits to hold the oversize jib and spinnaker, with masts which were up to 10 feet (3 m) high, the keel was designed as a dagger blade fin with a lead bulb weighing up to 24 pounds (11 kg).

In 1956 the racing came to an end when two bookies had a disagreement and one pull out a pistol. The NSW Police shut down the racing due to this event.

The Balmain Two Foot Model Sailing Club had a big following, with spectators and families of the sailors hiring a ferry every Sunday to watch the race. Betting on the race outcome was available with bookmakers providing the odds.

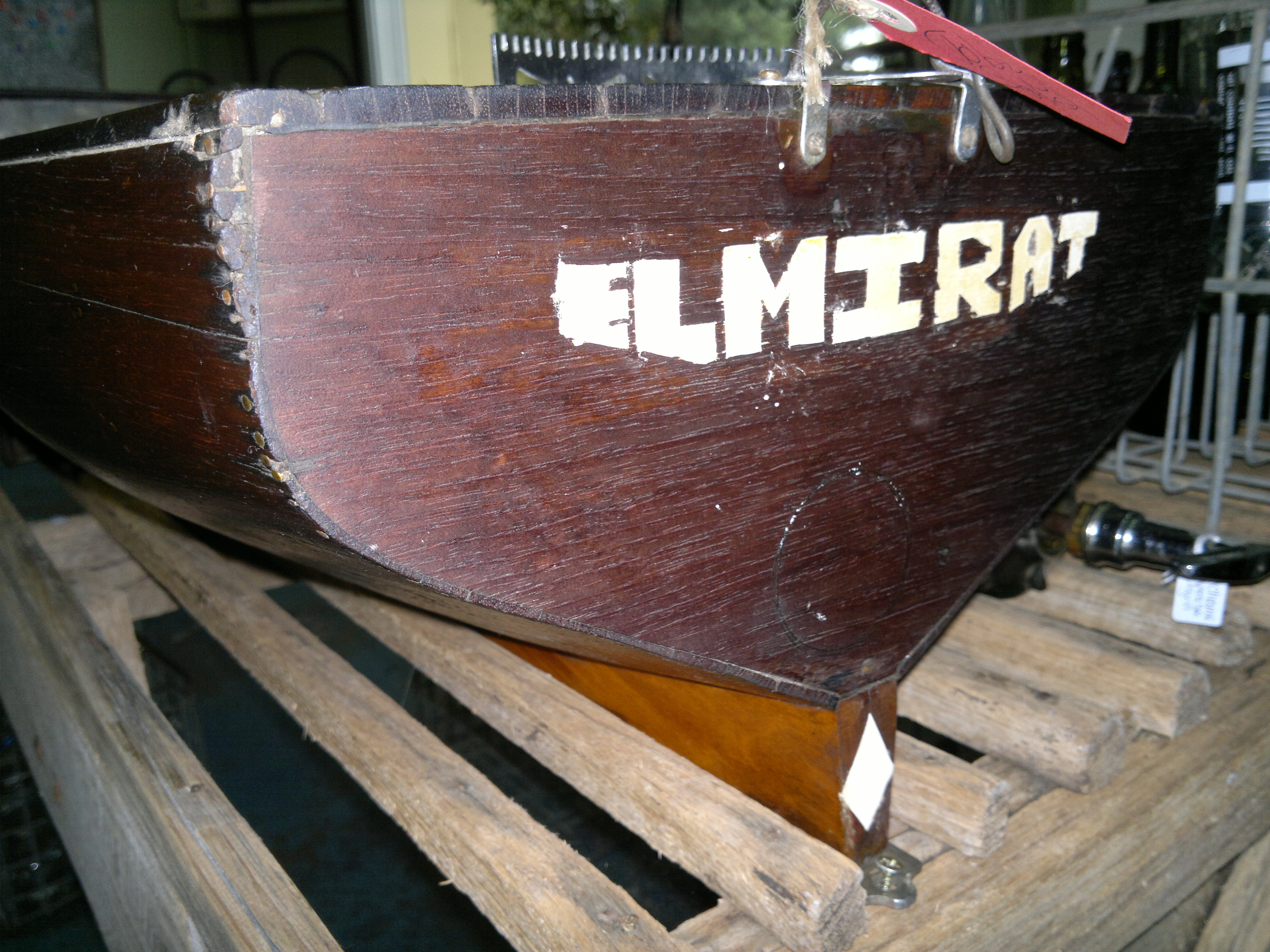
Rear view of a Two Foot Skiff named ELMIRAT

== Sources ==
- "Model Skiffs|Australian Maritime Museum". Australian Maritime Museum.
- McGoogan, George; Cuthbert, Penny; Australian National Maritime Museum (1998). "[Interview with George McGoogan relating to model skiff racing in Sydney]".
- Crewes, Stephen (2002). Sydney's model racing skiffs : a history. The Author. ISBN 978-0-9580191-0-1.
