= Footy (model yacht) =

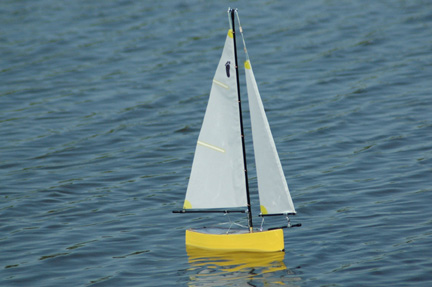
A footy sailboat

The Footy is a very small (usually) radio-control sailboat whose length is a mere 12 inches (30.5 cm). The hull can be made from a fiberglass mold, 3D printed or simply with thin sheets of plywood or even depron fitted together. Two servos are used, one to control the sail and one for the rudder. These are the smallest remote-controlled boats for which the world championships are held.

== History ==
The plans were reprinted in "Model Boats" magazine in 1975 and was perhaps the influence for the well-known British model yacht designer Roger Stollery to produce his "Choppa" design for his son Peter shortly after. In 1981 Brett McCormack of New Zealand saw a picture of "Choppa" in "Model Boats" magazine and was inspired to design a 12-inch yacht for a school technical drawing project. Much later, in 1996, he actually built the design as a free-sailing model for his 2-year-old son. In 2000 Richard Web came up with the idea of the Footy class as a radio-controlled yacht to sail on the pool at Weymouth Sailing Week. The class spread around the world with the "Ancient Mariners" in Auckland, New Zealand, building and racing scale type Footys. In 2001 Brett McCormack redesigned his 12-inch model and adapted it to radio control – the famous Bobabout design. Over the next four years the class continued to grow, with many boats being built from various plans and kits. Racing began at a number of UK clubs and in the far south of New Zealand. In 2005 the British Model Yachting Association decided to formally adopt the Footy class. An International team prepared a new "Box" rule to bring together the various versions across the world. All the original founders and supporters of 12-inch yachts were given a say in the rule. In 2006 the Footy became an officially sanctioned Development Class of the American Model Yachting Association. Serious international racing is scheduled to begin in 2007 and the future of the class seems assured.

== The boats ==
Given the open nature of the Footy rule, the boats themselves come in many flavours ranging from red-clawed racing machines to what are unashamedly character boats. Both of these manage to coexist within the same structure and Footy "community". A high proportion of older designs are hard-chine boats made from flat panels of balsa or ply, but a great many newer ones are round-bottomed made from fibreglass or even carbon fibre. Because of the weight of the older AM radio gear commonly used, Footys used to be rather heavy by model yacht standards. Among the racing fraternity, one of the great points of discussion currently is between the lighter, narrower Footys advocated mostly by Brett McCormack and Angus Richardson on the one hand and the wide, heavy "All-American Muscle Footy" popular in the United States.

One novelty of the class, which may well spread to others, is the McCormack rig. This is a single-sail rig in which the mast is allowed to bend sideways at its base to enable to boat to cope with gusts of wind without being overpowered. This allows more sail to be carried in light weather and eases the concentration requirements on the skipper when it blows.

Footys are suitable for construction by virtually anyone. Because of their small size they place a high premium on sailing ability as opposed to Star Wars technology. and no-one should feel themselves ruled out by lack of funds. For example, the well-known BUG design by Roger Stollery can be built largely from scrap materials for about £5 + radio gear (2 channel transmitter, receiver and 2 servos can be bought for around £40 and can be used in other models).

Footys are very often designed and built by their owners. However, for those with less time or confidence, there is an increasing range of high-quality kits on the market such as the 507 footy from Australia and the Kittywake from the US or Opalek and Elf from Poland.

== Racing ==
Because of the origins of the class – spread out across the world and largely spread by the Internet – racing in Footys was slow to take off: the boats were simply too far apart. The first revolution came when Ian Hull-Brown of New Zealand proposed and designed the “Internet Course”. This is in essence an easily made standard race course that allows boats anywhere in the world to run time trials against one another. Initially, the idea was widely applauded but found little practical application. Late in 2006, Brett McCormack proposed a format in which owners would submit their best times within a fixed period (say a month) to give a worldwide champion for the month. The first New Zealand Postal Classic was run in April 2007. Despite some errors of organisation from which the class associate feels it has learned a great deal, this event attracted some 33 entries. Further events using slightly different formats are continuously being scheduled.

At the same time, it was discovered that the standard Internet Course with little enhancement was ideal in size and geometry for normal fleet racing of Footys. The number of clubs that specifically race Footys and offering open regattas is increasing very quickly.

== Class organisation ==
The class is organised on a world basis. Every country where Footys are sailed appoints a registrar by any means that are found locally appropriate. The national registrars together form the world Class Management Committee. In order to provide as much impartiality as possible, matters of rule interpretation are in the hands of a technical team of three model yachtsmen of great experience, none of whom has any regular connection with Footys. It should not normally be possible for a national registrar to be a member of the technical team.

== See also ==
- Model yachting
- Radio-controlled boat
