= Sugarloaf Mountain (Rowan County, Kentucky) =

Mountain in Rowan County, Kentucky

- Location within Kentucky

Highest point
- Elevation: 1,348 ft (411 m)
- Coordinates: 38°13′10″N 83°31′48″W

Geography
- Location: Rowan County, Kentucky, U.S.

Geology
- Mountain type: Volcanic landform (unconfirmed)

Sugarloaf Mountain is a 1,348-foot (411 m) mountain located in Rowan County, Kentucky, just outside the City of Morehead, Kentucky.

In January, 1904, a volcanic eruption on Sugarloaf Mountain was reported in The New York Times, which noted much smoke, deep rumbling, and destruction to the trees, leading locals to prepare an evacuation. However, The Bee, a local Earlington, Kentucky-based newspaper, later reported the smoke was the result of an illicit moonshining operation which was shut down weeks later.
