= Samuel G. Havermale =

Methodist Minister

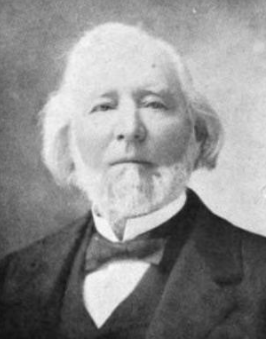
- Born: October 15, 1824; Sharpsburg, Maryland
- Died: January 13, 1904 (aged 79); Spokane, Washington
- Occupations: Clergyman, politician
- Spouse: Elizabeth Goldthrop (m. 1849)

Samuel G. Havermale (October 15, 1824 – January 13, 1904) was a notable Methodist minister and pioneer of Spokane.

== Biography ==
Havermale was born October 15, 1824, in Sharpsburg, Maryland. His family moved in 1833 to Montgomery County, Ohio. He was educated there, and then went on to Rock River Seminary, in Mount Morris, Illinois.

While there, on November 1, 1849, he married Elizabeth Goldthrop, who already had four children.

In 1873 he accepted a transfer to become pastor of the church at Walla Walla, Washington. He preached the first sermon to the white people at Spokane Falls in Washington Territory, and shortly afterward moved there with his family, where he preached until 1879. His pre-emption land is now the center of Spokane.

He was president of Spokane's first city council. Leaving the ministry, he became a mill owner, erecting a six-story structure with a capacity of 800 barrels a day. He finally sold out in 1887 and moved to San Diego, California, for a brief time, then returned to Spokane once more. In 1902 he was the defendant in an action in the Washington state Supreme Court. He died in Spokane on January 13, 1904.

He and his wife had three children.

Havermale High School, Havermale Island and the new Havermale Park are all named after him.
