= Footsie =

Footsie may refer to:

- "Footsee", a dance-track from the mid-1970s UK Northern soul scene
- Footsies, a playful form of flirting with feet
- Foot selfie, a photograph taken of one's own feet
- FTSE 100, the UK share index, informally known as the "Footsie"
- Footsie, a grime MC and record producer, one half of the East London duo Newham Generals
