= Joseph Nirschl =

German Catholic theologian and writer

Joseph Nirschl (b. at Durchfurth, Lower Bavaria, 24 February 1823; d. at Würzburg, 17 January 1904) was a German Catholic theologian and writer.

== Life ==
He was ordained in 1851 and graduated as doctor of theology in 1854 at Munich. He was appointed a teacher of Christian doctrine at Passau in 1855 and, in 1862, professor of church history and patrology. In 1879, he became professor of church history at the University of Würzburg, and was appointed dean of the cathedral in 1892.

== Works ==
Of his numerous works, mostly on patristics, the most important are:

- Lehrbuch der Patrologie und Patristik (3 vols., Mainz, 1881-5);
- Ursprung und Wesen des Bosen nach der Lehre des hl. Augustinus (Ratisbon, 1854);
- Das Dogma der unbefleckten Empfangnis Maria (Ratisbon, 1855);
- Todesjahr des hl. Ignatius von Antiochien (Passau, 1869);
- Die Theologie des hl. Ignatius von Antiochien (Passau, 1869, and Mainz, 1880);
- Das Haus und Grab der hl. Jungfrau Maria (Mainz, 1900).

He translated into German the Epistles of Ignatius of Antioch (Kempten, 1870) and the Catecheses of Cyril of Jerusalem (Kempten, 1871). He defended the genuineness of pseudo-Dionysius and of the apocryphal letter of King Abgar of Edessa to Jesus.
