= Juana López (nurse) =

Chilean army nurse

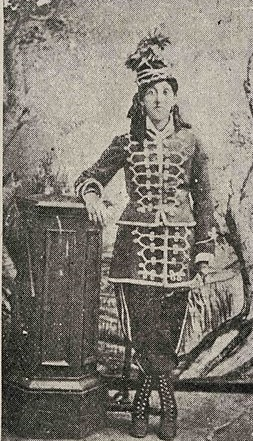
- Photograph in the July 1910 edition of Zig-Zag
- Born: c. 1845; Valparaíso
- Died: January 24, 1904 Santiago de Chile
- Allegiance: Chile
- Branch: Chilean Army
- Conflicts: War of the Pacific

Juana López (c. 1845, Valparaíso, Chile — 24 January 1904, Santiago de Chile, Chile) was a Chilean vivandière during the War of the Pacific. An officer's saber surrendered to López is now preserved in the collection of the National Historical Museum of Chile.

== Early life ==
Nothing is known of López's early life except that she was born Juana López in Valparaíso, Chile in about 1845.

== Military service ==
At the outbreak of the War of the Pacific in April 1879, López's husband and three sons enlisted in the Chilean Army. López also enlisted to keep the family together, but they were separated into different units and functions. López became a vivandière and was attached to the 2nd Valparaíso Battalion.

López's husband and two sons were killed in the Battle of San Francisco, while the third died during Lynch Expedition.

Five days before the Battle of San Juan, López gave birth to a boy.

López recorded the dates of the battles in which she participated on a captured officer's sword. Those battles were Antofagasta, Pisagua, San Francisco, Tacna, Chorrillos, and Miraflores. In recognition of her service, López was awarded three medals.

== Post-war life ==
Like many other women involved in the War of the Pacific and despite her decorations, López was forgotten by Chilean society after the war. She received a pension of 15 pesos and was cared for in her old age by her daughter, Ceferina Vargas. After López's death, local newspapers noted the proportional tininess of her pension compared to male veterans of the war.

=== Death ===
López died on 24 January 1904 of endocarditis in Chile's capital, Santiago and was buried in its General Cemetery. On 7 August 1910, Ceferina Vargas's instigation, a marble tombstone and an iron fence were erected on López's grave. Veterans of the Pacific War, a marching band, and the Santiago Police Department marched in honor of López to commemorate the finishing of her tomb.
