= Spreckels Lake =

Artificial reservoir in San Francisco

Coordinates: 37°46′16″N 122°29′39″W

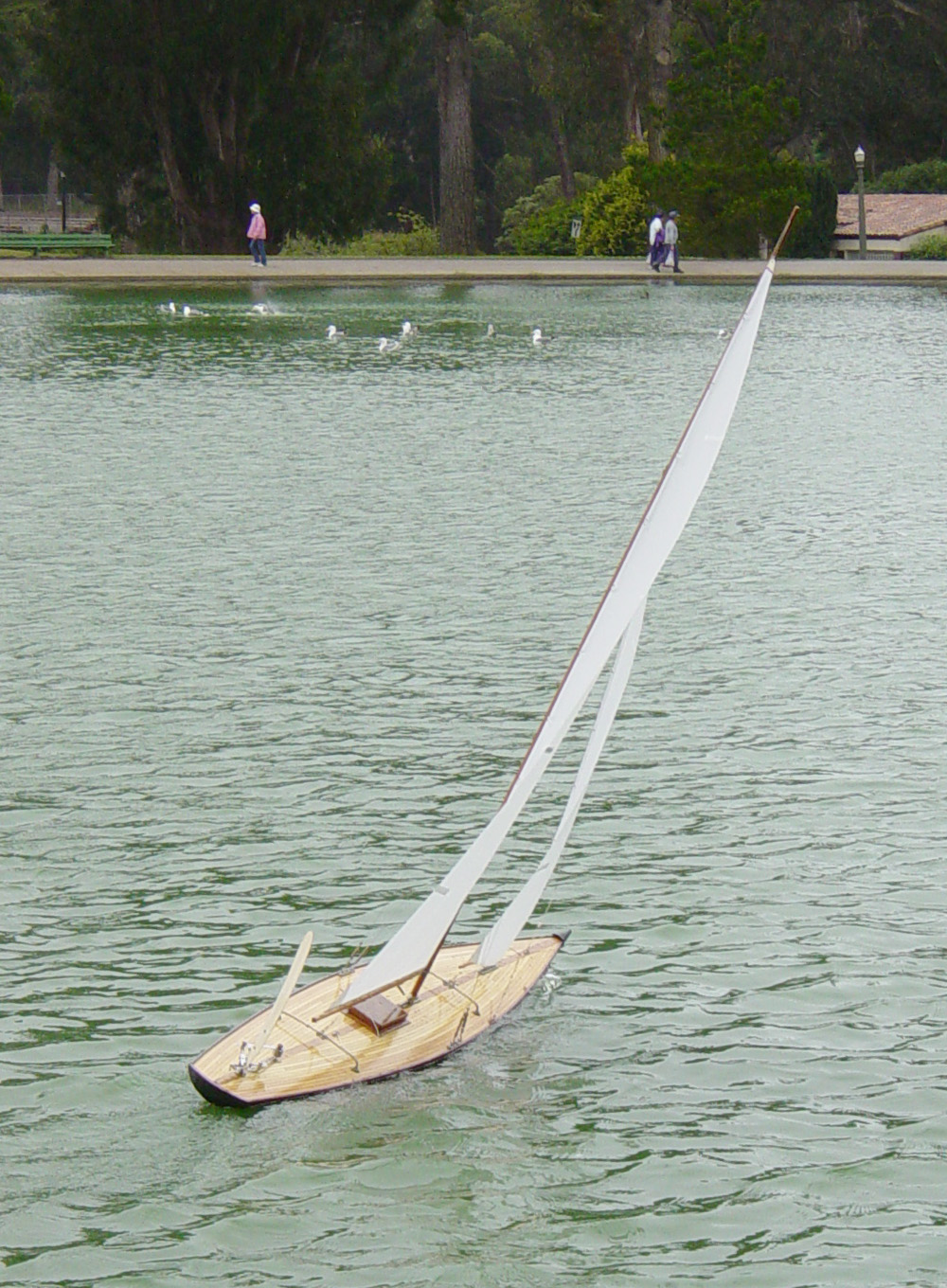
Model 'free sailing' yacht on Spreckels Lake

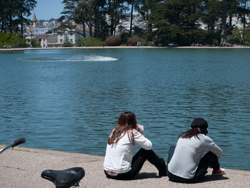
Watching a fast electric on Spreckels Lake - June 2, 2013

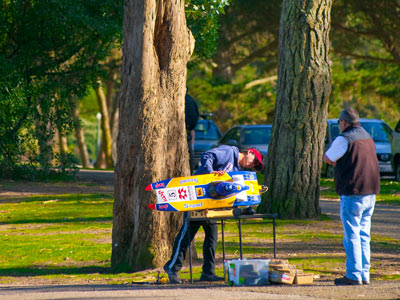
A big-boat enthusiast wipes down his boat, a SEGAD, after an early afternoon's successful run, January 19, 2013

The Spreckels Lake Model Yacht Facility, commonly referred to as "Spreckels Lake", is an artificial reservoir behind an earthen dam and adjoining clubhouse situated on the northern side of San Francisco's Golden Gate Park. Completed in mid-March 1904, the reservoir was built for the use of model boaters of all ages, interests, and skill levels, designed specifically for racing model sail and power boats and to propagate the skills and crafts necessary to build and sail competitive model boats of all types. The facility is also the permanent home to the San Francisco Model Yacht Club (SFMYC), the organization at whose request Spreckels Lake and the adjoining clubhouses were built.

== The Spreckels Lake Model Yacht Facility ==
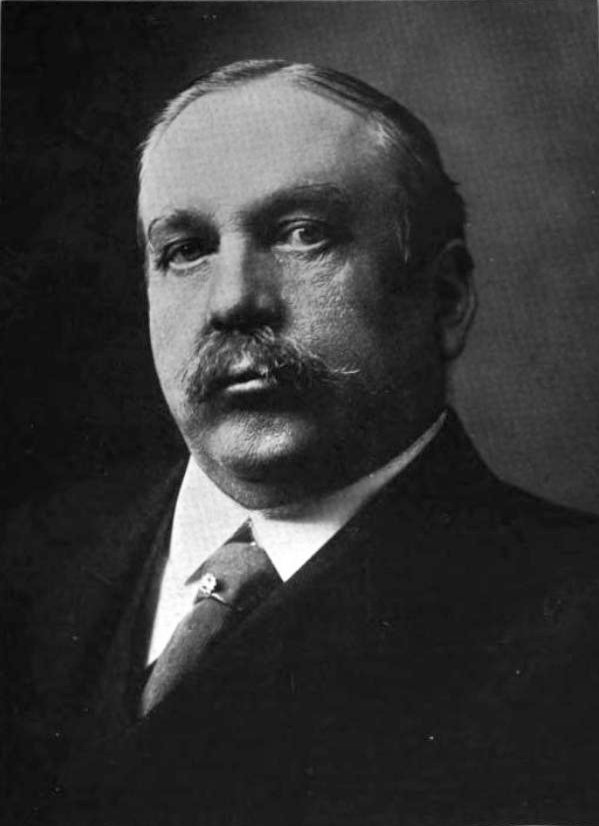
Park Commissioner Adolph B. Spreckels

=== The lake ===
Spreckels Lake is an artificial, clay-lined, reservoir holding around 7.8 million gallons (23.94 acre feet/29,530,000 liters) of non-potable (not-drinkable) well-water behind an earthen dam that forms its western edge, walkway, and the 36th Avenue roadbed, which crosses the top of the dam after entering Golden Gate Park at Fulton Street. Situated between 36th Avenue and 31st Avenue to the east, on the north side of the Park between Spreckels Lake Drive and Fulton Street to the north and John F. Kennedy Drive to the south, making it part of San Francisco's famed 49-Mile Scenic Drive, the lake is named for sugar-fortune heir and San Francisco Parks Commission President Adolph B. Spreckels. At a meeting of the Park Commissioners on Friday, January 29, 1904, over the objections of Spreckels who had wanted it called the "Model Yacht Lake", the other Commissioners named the lake in his honor "as he originated the enterprise and gave the work throughout his personal attention."

Designed specifically for model boating and measuring approximately 950 feet (east–west) by 420 feet at its widest, the irregularly shaped "Model Yacht Lake" began being filled with water pumped into it from the underground aquifers near Ocean Beach by the Dutch Windmill on January 14, 1904, when Spreckels and Park Superintendent John McLaren "directed the adjustment of the valve". The new lake was filled and judged completed by late February or early March of that year, and the lake model yachting facilities officially opened a little under a month later on Sunday, March 20.

Spreckels Lake is the only San Francisco lake that currently allows any model boating without special permits from the San Francisco Recreation and Parks Department (SF Rec. & Parks) under their interpretation of the law. Anyone may sail most types of model boats on Spreckels Lake with few restrictions.

Since its construction, Spreckels Lake has been home to the San Francisco Model Yacht Club (SFMYC), whose application to the Park Commissioners in 1902 for a dedicated model boating site other than the crowded Blue Heron Lake (then known as Stow Lake) resulted in the creation of Spreckels Lake. The SFMYC has sailed various kinds of model watercraft on it continuously since before the day it opened.

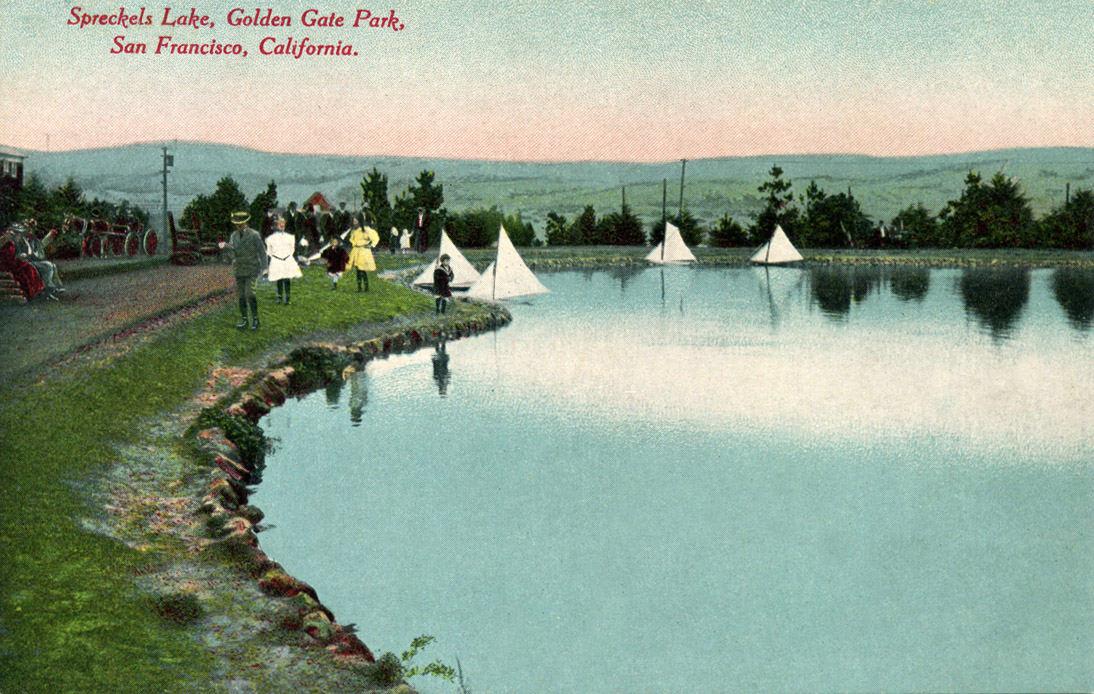
Vintage postcard of the northwest corner of Spreckels Lake, c1904/05, looking north toward 36th Avenue and Fulton Street on left with the boats of the SFMYC. Note the Lake edge construction and slope.

==== Construction ====
Originally budgeted at $21,000 in late January 1903 (approximately $567,568(us) in 2015 dollars) by the Park Commissioners, the as yet unnamed lake was built over the next 13 months with a 'natural', sloping shoreline and redwood retaining wall covered with fist- to foot-sized rocks to stabilize the soil and resist erosion. Spreckels Lake's redwood, pile-driven side-walls were later redesigned and retrofitted sometime during the 1930s with the current concrete system which was built directly over much of the original shoreline, burying it under raised back-fill and raising the water level of the lake. This also softened the original contours of the lake better suiting the operation of the types of 'sail-driven,' self-guided yachts then, and still used, by the SFMYC. This combination of vertical edging and approximately 36-plus-inch depth at the bank allows these deeply keeled yachts to approach all the way to the lake edge while remaining afloat. When drained, much of the reservoir's original contour can again be seen outlined by the original rocks.

The original packed-earth walkway, which can be seen in the old postcards and photos of that era, was replaced at the same time with an asphalt-paved walkway surrounding the lake atop earthen backfill behind the retaining wall. Over the past 30 years, however, the walkway has increasingly suffered from subsidence of the soil beneath the asphalt and repairs have required draining the lake on more than one occasion to shore up or patch the foundation of the retaining wall where it has been undercut. In 2013, a substantial portion of the southeastern bank, about 160 feet in length, had to be completely demolished and replaced with a new, reinforced, deep foundation retaining wall; however at least one other area of the walkway and old wall now shows similar early signs of distress, cracking and collapse.

The depth of the reservoir in 2013 is between three and five feet around the edge to around six feet or so at the deepest in the middle of the eastern portion of the Lake. The bottom away from the older hard-pack soil close to the sides, is a layer of accumulated fine silt and organic detritus probably two or more feet thick which contributes to the murkiness of the water and gets a bit thicker every year. Model boats that sink in the lake may actually submerge into this heavy muck and may become irretrievable by most methods short of hiring a diver. Visibility in the lake's water is usually measured as a matter of a few inches.

==== Secondary purpose ====
The lake also serves as a gravity-fed source of non-potable, fire-fighting water for the local neighborhood should San Francisco's main and backup fire-fighting water supply systems ever fail, the lake water can be tapped through three green and blue, color-coded hydrants located on Fulton Street on the south side of the intersections of 30th, 34th and 36th Avenues.

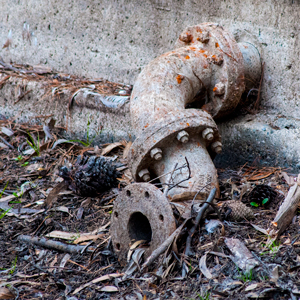
The drainage inlet pipe (from Blue Heron Lake), Spreckels Lake

==== Plumbing ====
The water in Spreckels Lake is a murky, algae-laden, non-potable mix of mainly ground water from the Park's deep wells and some surface water drained from Blue Heron Lake, not, as commonly believed, reclaimed water. The drainage from Blue Heron Lake enters the lake via a five or six-inch pipe from under the lake's normal surface level at the far eastern end of the lake and is mainly used to keep a stable water level for Spreckels Lake and has a flow of about 120 gallons a minute when fully opened. A second, smaller inlet beneath the surface on the south shore near JFK Drive allows large volumes of groundwater to be pumped directly into the Lake from the Park's high-pressure pumping station.

In normal circumstances, the water exits the lake via an overflow-style drain in the extreme western end of the lake near the Concrete Turtle in the area known to the model yacht club members as "Turtle Cove."

When the lake is being drained, a pair of grated, submerged drains in Turtle Cove and a single open drain about 15 feet out from the lake's north shore lead to the Fulton St. hydrants mentioned previously. This gravity-fed system will empty about half the lake's water over about a five-day period before the level drops enough to expose the drains. If work requires the lake to be lowered further still, SF Rec and Parks will bring in gasoline powered pumps.

SF Rec. and Parks has endeavored when possible to leave enough water in the deeper areas of the east end of the lake so even with evaporation, the larger fish and turtles that populate the lake will survive the experience.

==== The clubhouses ====
Also part of the Spreckels Lake Model Yacht Facility is the SFMYC's second and current clubhouse which serves as meeting hall, storage facility, workshop and library. It stands on the western side of 36th Avenue at the intersection of 36th Avenue and John F. Kennedy Drive. The structure cost $15,719 ($212,035 US 2015 Dollars) and was built by the Works Progress Administration (WPA) starting in 1937 and completed by 1939. for the use of the club in perpetuity using a combination of donations raised by SFMYC members by private subscriptions (the majority), federal assistance and help from San Francisco city government. The WPA, upon completion of the building, deeded it in perpetuity via charter to the Model Yacht Club.

The structure's red-tiled roof and concrete building with wooden, high-ceilinged interior reflects the WPA-era fusion of Mission Revival and Craftsman-style architectures that matches other buildings in the area including the Police and Public Stables across JFK Drive to the south.

The current clubhouse replaced an earlier building salvaged by SFMYC members and the City of San Francisco from the remnants of the 'little' St. Francis Hotel after its removal from Union Square. It was rebuilt near the proposed but never built Polo Fields Stadium site with a budget of $16,000 in 1909 and served the club until they moved to their current building in 1938.

The clubhouse is open to the public on a request basis or if accompanied by a key-holding member of the model yacht club.

There are exterior entrance washrooms, men's on the north side of the building and women's on the south until 7 pm local time.

=== Model boaters move to Spreckels Lake ===
Model yachting, in a more organized sense, seems to have reached the San Francisco Bay Area sometime during or after the early to mid-1870s. Early traditions tell of open-water model sailing competitions on San Francisco Bay held between the boardwalk of Miegg's Pier and Goat Island (Yerba Buena Island) as well as on Lake Merritt in Oakland, CA and Marin County's Richardson Bay where the competition was sometimes between the crews of the many cargo ships anchored there.

Model boaters were among the first people to take advantage of the newly opened Blue Heron Lake in 1893 as a venue for their models. Less than a decade later in 1902 the model yachtsmen, represented by the San Francisco Model Yacht Club (formed 1892), citing crowded conditions and consequent friction at Blue Heron Lake, petitioned the Parks Commission, of which Adolf B. Spreckels, was part, to create a "model yachting lake" within Golden Gate Park pointing to the model boating facilities found in European and East Coast parks where model boat racing competitions drew large crowds.

The San Francisco Model Yacht Club moved from Blue Heron Lake to its new home on Spreckels Lake even before the lake opened, immediately setting up an 1800-foot, two-length race course still in use today and holding its first racing event there on Sunday, February 28, 1904, as soon as the only partially filled Lake contained the minimum four feet of water required to successfully float and race their boats. The first boat to win on the new lake was then club Vice-Commodore Henry London's "Imp," the "Sautee," owned by L. S. Adams finished second. Spreckels Lake would officially open 28 days later on Sunday, March 20, 1904, when the club also held its first opening day regatta on the lake.

Model boating enthusiasts flock to the lake to run their boats as it is now, quite literally, known "around the world" and an event venue within the greater model boating community. In addition to many individual model boaters, the most prominent and organized group using the lake on a regular basis is still the SFMYC but there are others as well. The "Spreckels Irregulars" are a loosely affiliated, model power boating group who are active at the lake and includes a couple SFMYC members, but the "Spreckels Irregulars", in general, do not wish to associate with the SFMYC for various reasons. The Northern California Wheeler yacht fleet has recently begun to hold at least one local series regatta there annually. Members of the Western Warship Combat Club also frequent the lake although with empty magazines and safeties engaged.

The lake has also been the site of a number of regional and national championships under the auspices of the American Model Yachting Association (AMYA). Historically, the North American Model Boat Association (NAMBA) has also held a number of events at the lake including a number of racing competitions for high-speed, gas-powered boats such as the Selby Cup(an international open event) for .35 outboard hydroplanes. The club was a pioneer of the .35 Outboard class though its membership, especially Jay Selby, and was, in a great part, responsible for its establishment as an accepted racing class.

==== The San Francisco Model Yacht Club (SFMYC) ====
The San Francisco Model Yacht Club for whom the lake was built regards Spreckels Lake its home waters and the history of the lake and model yacht club become inseparable as neither would exist without the other.

In addition to regional and nation co-sponsored events and regattas, the SFMYC sponsors a full calendar of club and open free-sail and RC sail events and a now very restricted number of powerboat events on the Lake. A number of these were or have become well known to other modelers as well as having been historically important or seminal modeling events such as the "Bart" and "Dickie" Cup Regattas for sailors and Golden Gate Scale Concours (d'Elegance), Wooden Boats on Parade and the Golden Gate Outboard Regatta founded by model outboard pioneer and then club member, Jay Selby for power boats.

==== The Spreckels Irregulars ====
The "Spreckles Irregulars" are a loosely affiliated but very active informal group of model boating hobbyists and friends who are regulars at the southern lakeside. They mainly operate many types of model power boats, both liquid fueled and electric, as well as a few sailboats but are not affiliated with the SFMYC for any number of reasons.

The "Irregulars" are unstructured in that they do not hold events or races at the lake, but are content to meet in the late mornings on nearly every weekend day and sometimes during the week to run their models and enjoy the convivial company of fellow enthusiasts. Most have been model boaters for many decades.

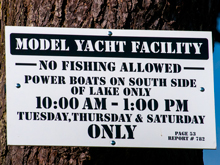
The new sign (replacing the elder sign below) with SF Rec and Park rules closing the North Shore of Spreckels Lake to all powered boats.

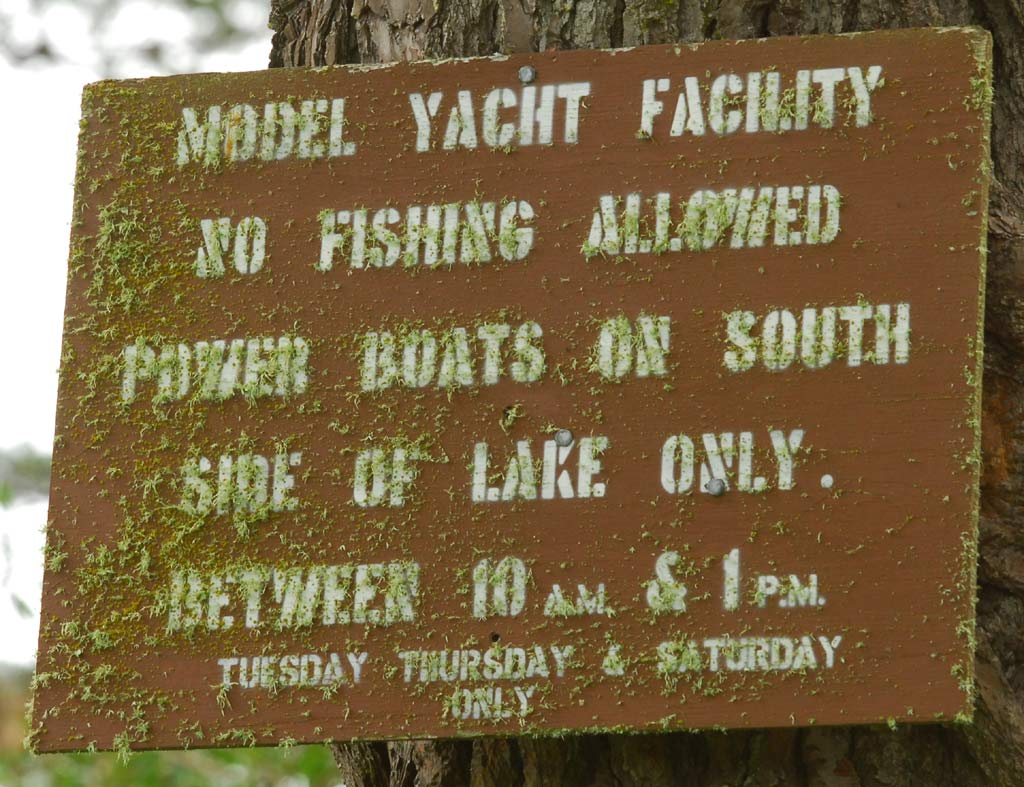
1970s era sign stating SF Rec and Parks rules for Spreckels Lake Model Yacht Facility. The sign was missing, apparently stolen.

=== Policies and availability ===
Spreckels Lake is usually open to everyone to enjoy year round as long as the overall park itself is open. Anyone interested can walk, run, loaf, watch or sail any boats as they wish. From time to time, the San Francisco Model Yacht Club may cordon off certain areas for special events or regattas but there is almost always plenty of room for other modelers to set-up and run in other areas of the walkway and lake.

The exceptions are that during marathons and festivals such as the San Francisco Marathon, the Outside Lands Music and Arts Festival or the Hardly Strictly Bluegrass Festival vehicle access to the lake is closed and the lake itself maybe fenced off by event organizers.

Powered boats are forbidden to run on the northern side of the lake to keep from creating noise issues with the neighborhood bordering on Fulton Street.

Recreation and Parks further set apart an area where fast, powered model boats are forbidden to run, to wit: from a point on the mid-south shore of the lake to a point 75 feet from shore as marked by a buoy to the center of the jetty that extends into the lake from the western shore of the lake. This area is restricted to slower scale and steam boats running under 5 MPH and since 2013 is cordoned off by red and white buoys. Other than staying out of the cordoned-off area when scale or steam boats are using the lake and the overall 15MPH speed limit, there are no other restrictions restricting the public's use of the lake.

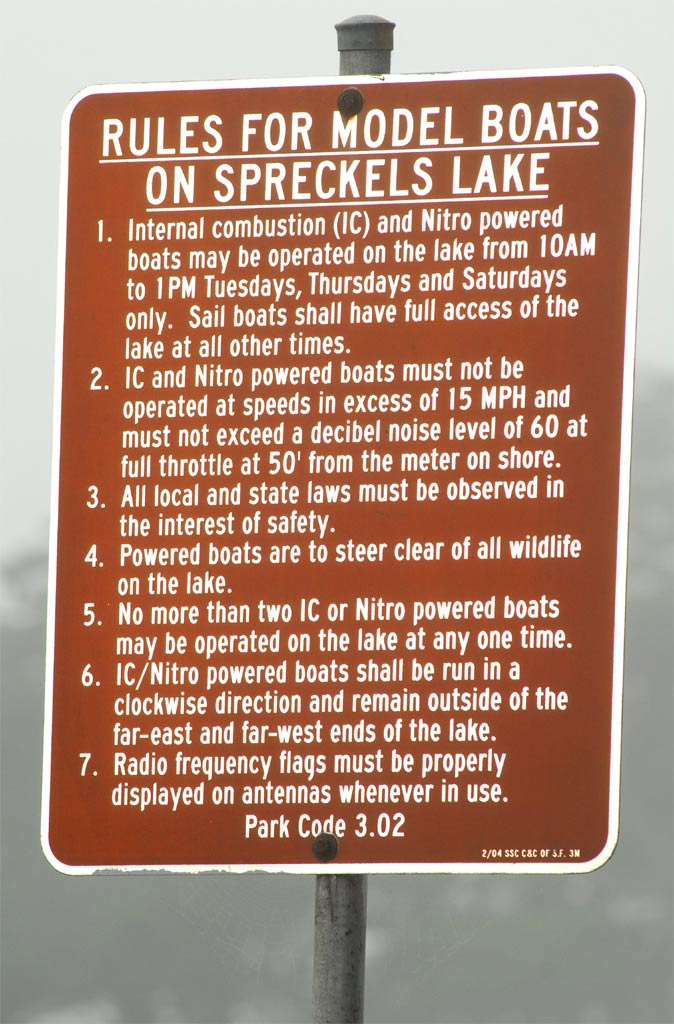
Out of date signage showing the old rules for the lake, now removed

Current rules for model boats at Spreckels Lake. The Recreation and Parks Department added two new rules in May 2015. The first change was that ALL boats were now required to observe the 15 MPH speed limit. The second was that model aviation was now prohibited at the lake.

1. Internal Combustion (IC) and Nitro powered boats may be operated on the lake from 10 am to 1 pm Tuesdays, Thursdays and Saturdays only. Sail boats shall have full access of the lake at all other times.
2. IC and Nitro powered boats must not be operated at speeds in excess of 15 MPH and must not exceed a decibel noise level of 60 at full throttle at 50' from the meter on shore.
3. All local and state laws must be observed in the interest of safety.
4. Powered boats are to steer clear of all wildlife on the lake.
5. No more than two IC or Nitro powered boats may be operated on the lake at any one time.
6. IC/Nitro powered boats shall be run in a clockwise direction and remain outside of the far-east and far-west ends of the lake.
7. Radio frequency flags must be properly displayed on antennas whenever in use.

=== Lake wildlife ===
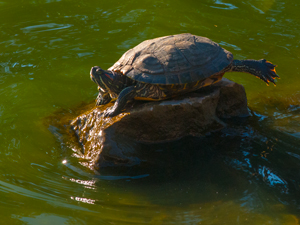
Ol Br'er Turtle, a large red-eared slider (Trachemys scripta elegans) suns himself on a rock, August 2013.

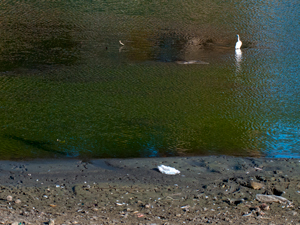
A great egret (Ardea alba), hunts the shallow water in a partially drained Spreckels Lake. Note the Harley frame poking its kickstand out of the water. - August 2013

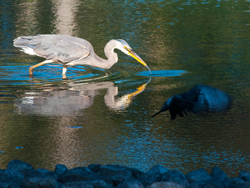
A great blue heron hunts the shallow water at Spreckels Lake, - June 27, 2013

The ecology of Spreckels Lake is entirely artificial yet is home to a number species of birds, a temporary resting place for some species of migratory waterfowl and game-birds, as well as some aquatic species, and various species of fish and turtles. The surrounding trees are good habitat for squirrels and other foragers as well as hunting territory for predatory species such as heron and coyote.

Note: Pets must be kept on a leash at Spreckels. Not only because of park rules, but because to coyotes, large dogs are competitors in their hunting grounds or interlopers in their cubbing territory, and small pets may be eaten.

Birds known to habituate to the lake in addition to feral pigeons and seagulls include common ducks and mallards, coots, grebes, swallows, cormorants, herons and egrets and, occasionally, domestic geese. Seasonal waterfowl seen to use the lake as a resting stop-over during migration include migratory ducks and Canada geese.

Aquatically, the lake's algae-laden water hosts minnows, sticklebacks and carp. Wild carp up to around 24 inches in size also inhabit the lake, though some appear to be discarded goldfish or koi that have managed to survive. There is a 'tradition' of dumping goldfish in many of Golden Gate Park's lakes, sometimes by the bucketfuls, for good luck as well as a means of 'freeing' unwanted pets.

The lake also supports a fairly robust colony of turtles of various species. Most appear to be red-eared sliders, a non-native species originally from the southern United States that was extremely popular as a children's pet. At least a couple turtles living in the lake do not display the red markings typical of the red-eared slider and may be western painted turtles, a native species. There is at least one large (12 to possibly 14-inch) soft shelled turtle of unknown species also living in the lake. Most of the turtles were probably introduced to the lake as discarded pets though a thriving population of turtles was noted as far back as 1912.

There seem to be some freshwater clams, probably dropped by seagulls and, at least historically, crawfish. Many older local residents remember catching crawfish in traps in the lake as young children during the 1930s and 1940s.

There used to be a small population of cats composed of "'outside' house-pets," discarded pets and ferals, though they are now rarely seen, possibly due to predation by the coyotes that recently have moved into the park after crossing the Golden Gate Bridge from Marin County as early as 2004. or 2001. One coyote was photographed dragging off a heron it had taken near the area late in spring 2013, by a local wildlife photographer. A mated pair was reportedly observed denning with a litter of pups between North Lake and the Golden Gate Golf Course in 2014.

The herons in turn find the many pocket gophers that burrow in the grass surrounding the lake quite tasty.

==== Periodic fish kills ====
Due to the algae-laden water, the overall shallow depth of the lake due to built-up silt and sedimentation and the general low rate of exchange of the lake's waters the lake is almost always murky with very low visibility. When the conditions are right; warm, still, shallow water, usually during a summer or 'Indian-summer's' periodic bright, heat spell, the lake can suffer an algal bloom, resulting in deteriorating conditions and deoxygenated water, triggering a suffocation die-off of fish and other water-breathing animals. This is one reason for the aeration system in the lake (currently inoperative), to both oxygenate and stir the water. The lake, however, will need to be fully restored, mostly likely including being dredged, for a long-term solution to be found.

This problem is likely to grow worse as the weather and lake waters become warmer due to Climate Change.

=== Harassment of Lake Wildlife ===
Deliberate harassment of the wildlife, with a model or other means is forbidden under SFMYC club rules, illegal under SF Rec and Park rules, the San Francisco Municipal Code, and state and federal statutes as well.

It is illegal to feed the birds at the lake.

=== Restoration of the lake ===
As of May 2013, any restoration efforts made to the lake of the last 20 years have, with the exception of the addition of the aeration system, mainly been patches, done in a piecemeal fashion for a number of reasons, lack of sufficient funding apparently being a leading factor. Monies were voted on 2 June 1992 to restore all the lakes overseen in Golden Gate Park as part of City which allocated $76,300,000(us) for the "repair, reforestation and rehabilitation" of the park, but the project apparently bogged down in delays dues to unexpected complications and issues with other lakes such as North Lake and now the funds have been exhausted before Spreckels Lake was touched.

Issues currently affecting the lake needing to be addressed include:

- Deterioration, subsidence and consequent cracking and sinking of the surrounding walkway and retaining wall that contain the lake resulting in cracking of and potholes in the asphalt.
- Replacement of aging lake edging.
- Removal of trash items such as motorcycle frames, fire extinguishers, shopping carts etc., from the lake bed.
- The accumulation of silt and other detritus raising the level of the lake bottom leading to the type of conditions that can trigger fish kills.
- Removal of the bird droppings.

Droppings from seagulls and feral pigeons make this a constant, year-round issue but during the migratory seasons especially, Canada geese foul the walkways making it difficult to walk and leading some locals to refer to one area as "Guano Point." The high-nitrate droppings also affect the quality of water when washed into the lake by rain or clean-up efforts.

- Bird feeders: Members of the public who attract and sustain the feral bird populations and whose leavings also affect the quality of lake water.
- Maintenance or replacement of the two compressors of the reservoir's aeration system as needed and excavating the bubbler lines clear of the mud.

As of 2015, The Recreation and Park Department is investigating installing two moored floating fountains in Spreckels Lake to circulate, cool and oxygenate the water as a replacement for the bubbler system and its compressors. This is necessitated by the sinking of the bubbler lines into the silt, clogging the air outlets, causing back-pressure in the air lines and repeatedly damaging the compressors.

- Overall water quality of the lake.

==== Partial restoration of the southeastern retaining wall and walkways; June–August 2013 ====
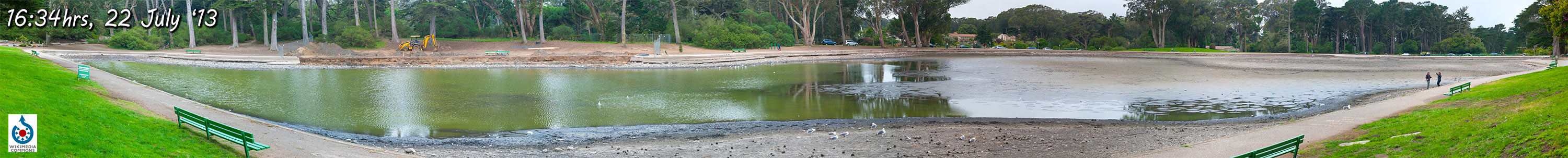
Spreckels Lake, looking south. The lake is drained and undergoing partial reconstruction of the southeast edge containment wall due to subsidence of the older wall by lake water.

June–August 2013: Spreckels Lake was drained to the point where it was just habitable for the fish and turtles so a section of the southeastern walkway and retaining wall that was becoming a hazard to walk on could be demolished, removed and replaced with a modern, rebar-reinforced, concrete retaining wall with a large integral foundation dug into the earth below the lake bed. The older wall remaining that contains the lake waters is very lightly reinforced with two or three horizontal pieces of old rebar, does not have any real foundation in the modern sense and probably rested directly on the lake bed when it was built. Unfortunately now in places, some of the old wall doesn't even rest on the lake bottom but hangs off the asphalt walkway supported by the back filled earth which is being washed out from under the wall by the lake's waters. These areas are already showing kind of signs of the progressive failure that necessitated the replacement of the southeastern section.

=== Other activities ===
- Weekly tai chi classes are held along the western shore of the Lake near Turtle Cove.
- The surrounding walkway is a favored walking and light-exercise area for the neighborhood.
- Historically, the lake was the venue for swimming competition during San Francisco's Portolá Festival, October 19–23, 1909
- The Outside Lands Music and Arts Festival takes place annually in August and is centered at the Polo Fields directly south from Spreckels Lake across John F. Kennedy Drive. Access to the lake is restricted during the run of Outside Lands.

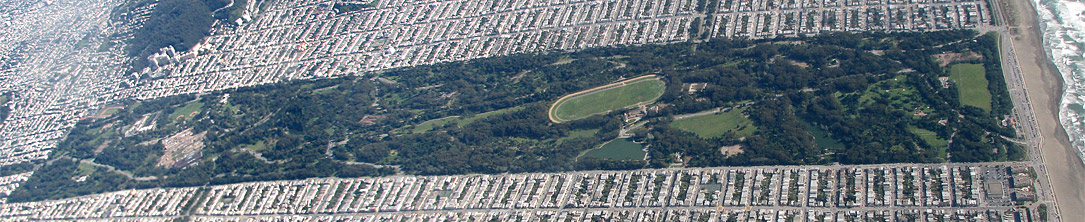
Golden Gate Park and Spreckels Lake just right of center below the oval Polo Fields seen from the air looking to the south.

=== Lake Usage Authority ===
While SF Park and Recreation Department is the controlling authority for public use of Spreckels Lake including model boaters not associated with the SFMYC, the Rec & Parks Department routinely follows the lead of the SFMYC in making usage rules for the lake as they regard the SFMYC the primary users of the Lake and the "experts" in mandating and controlling its use.

== See also ==
- List of lakes in California
- List of lakes in the San Francisco Bay Area
