= Claus Spreckels =

German-born American industrialist

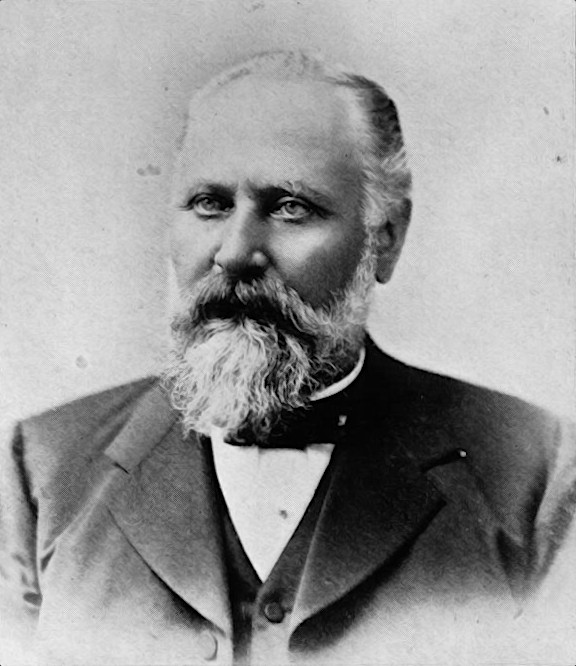
- Portrait by I. W. Taber c. 1881
- Born: July 9, 1828; Lamstedt, Kingdom of Hanover (now Lower Saxony, Germany)
- Died: December 26, 1908 (aged 80); San Francisco, California, U.S.
- Burial place: Cypress Lawn Memorial Park
- Occupation: Industrialist
- Known for: Development of agriculture, industry, and transportation in California and Hawaii; founder of Spreckels Sugar Company
- Spouse: Anna Christina Mangels (1830–1910)
- Children: 13, five lived to adulthood: John Diedrich (1853–1926), Adolph Bernard (1857–1924), Claus August (1858–1946), Emma Claudina (1870–1924), Rudolph (1872–1958)

Claus Spreckels (Note: His last name has often been misspelled in many sources as "Spreckles", e.g., Google Books search "Claus Spreckles", Google Scholar search "Claus Spreckles") (July 9, 1828 – December 26, 1908) was a German-born American industrialist in California and Hawaii, during the kingdom and republican periods of the islands' history. He founded or was involved in several enterprises, most notably the company that bears his name, Spreckels Sugar Company.

== Early life and family ==
Spreckels was born in Lamstedt, in the Kingdom of Hanover, a constituent kingdom of the German Confederation. Spreckels was the eldest of six children of the farmer John Diederich Spreckels (1802–1873) and his wife Gesche Baak (1804–1875), a family that had occupied a homestead in Lamstedt for many generations. He grew up in Lamstedt and attended elementary school. After the bad harvests of 1845 and 1846, the resulting inflation and hunger crisis reached its peak in 1847. Spreckels emigrated to the United States in 1848 at the age of 19 to start a new life, with only one German thaler in his pocket, which upon arrival in the US, he exchanged for 75 cents. (Equivalent to about $30 in 2023 dollars.) Spreckels settled in Charleston, South Carolina, working as a grocery clerk, taking over the grocery store after a year and a half by buying it on credit from the retiring shop owner.

In 1852, he married his childhood sweetheart, Anna Christina Mangels (September 4, 1830 in Ankelohe, Kingdom of Hanover, German Confederation – February 15, 1910, San Francisco, California), who had immigrated to New York City with her brother three years earlier. They had 13 children, five of whom lived to maturity. His surviving sons were John D. Spreckels (1853-1926), Adolph B. Spreckels (1857-1924), Claus August (1858-1946), and Rudolph Spreckels (1872-1958). He had one daughter, Emma Claudina (1870-1924), who married Watson Ferris Hutton. The remaining children died in childhood, in several cases, within a few months of each other, either from diphtheria or from other unspecified pandemic diseases, possibly cholera.

== In California ==
=== Early business ventures ===
In 1854, Claus and his family left Charleston for New York City, where he operated a grocery with his brother-in-law, Claus Mangels. In 1855, he was visited by his younger brother Bernhard, who operated a grocery store in San Francisco and was en route back to their home town of Lamstedt to marry. Bernhard regaled Claus with stories about the city and its booming post-Gold Rush economy. Already disliking New York City and sensing an opportunity, Spreckels soon sold his share of the grocery business there to his brother-in-law and bought out Bernhard's San Francisco grocery, relocating there with his family in 1856.

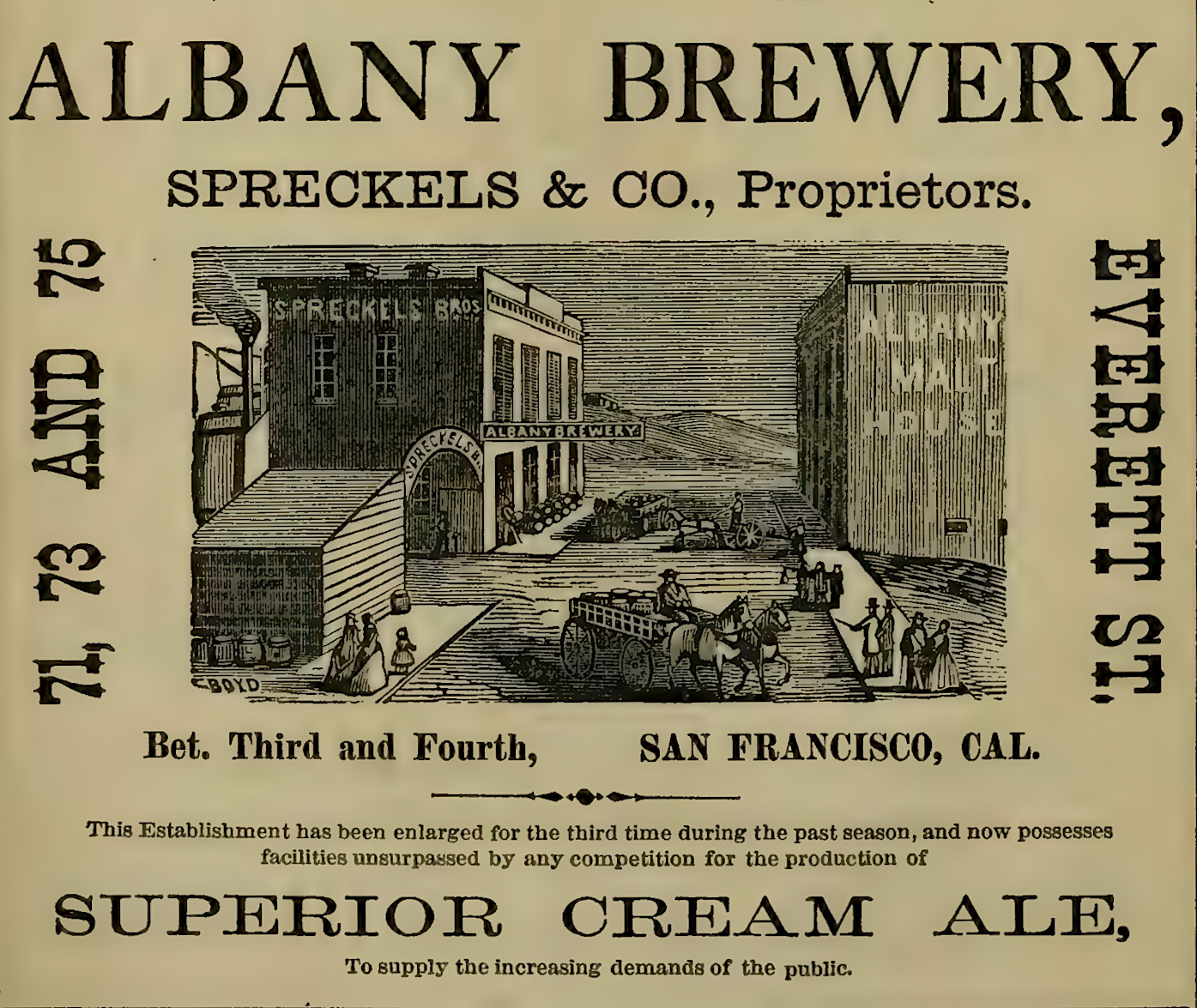
Albany Brewery advertisement. From: Langley's San Francisco Directory for 1874.

After about a year of operating a successful grocery in San Francisco, he again grew restless with the lack of growth opportunity in that line of business. Noting the generally poor quality of San Francisco "quick-brewed beer" of that time, he saw brewing as an industry with strong growth potential. He partnered again with Claus Mangels and with a younger brother, Peter Spreckels, to start a brewery and sold off his grocery business soon after. Spreckels and his partners opened the Albany Brewery on Everett St near Fourth Street (now Yerba Buena Gardens) in 1857, and soon afterward opened a saloon, the Albany Malt House, across the street. The brewery's first product was a cream ale, but later added a German-style lager and a steam beer, which, by some accounts, introduced steam beer to California.

Brewing proved a sometimes difficult line of work. Beermaking required constant monitoring for temperature, something that might be ignored when a shift change happened, requiring Spreckels to come in late at night and monitor the process himself. He later stated that he often slept no more than four hours per day for months on end. The brewery and saloon were successful and became the second largest brewery in San Francisco, but never managed to surpass competitor John Wieland's Philadelphia Brewery for the top position. Spreckels himself never made more than a modest income after splitting the earnings with his partners.

=== Building a sugar business: 1863–1865 ===
Spreckels saloon was located in the same area as George Gordon's San Francisco and Pacific Sugar Refinery and frequented by some of its workmen. Spreckels had overheard a conversation between these workmen discussing the wastefulness of the sugar refining process at their factory, which allowed large amounts of sugar liquor to overflow and run into the sewers. Spreckels sensed that if the refinery could still turn a profit while wasting so much of its product, then the profit potential in sugar must be enormous. An additional factor was the outbreak of the American Civil War in 1861, which cut off the North from Southern sugar supplies, causing demand to outstrip supply.

In 1863, Spreckels decided to go into the sugar refining business, leaving management of the brewery in the hands of his partners. In order to familiarize himself with the process of sugar refining, he relocated to New York City (then the center of the American sugar industry) for several months, taking an entry-level night shift job at the Charles W. Durant sugar refinery and learning all aspects of the process. During the day, he toured other sugar refineries, asking detailed questions about their process. Spreckels had his eldest son John accompany him on this extended trip and included him on factory tours so that he would learn the business as well. While in New York City, Spreckels took advantage of the opportunity to purchase a full set of sugar refining equipment from the recently bankrupted United States Refinery, having it shipped around Cape Horn to San Francisco.

In 1864, Spreckels opened the Bay Sugar Refining Company, the first of a series of sugar refining enterprises, establishing a factory at Union and Battery Streets, near the San Francisco waterfront. Claus Spreckels would again partner with Claus Mangels and Peter Spreckels, but also brought in financers Hermann Meese and Louis Meyer as partners. At the same time, he finally sold off his remaining shares of the Albany Brewery, leaving that business in the hands of Mangels and Peter Spreckels. In a letter to a colleague, George Gordon wrote, "I am greatly annoyed at the action of that fool, Spreckles [sic] in building another sugar refinery for which there is no room." However, the new company expanded rapidly, and using price war tactics, grew its market share of sugar in California at the expense of Gordon's San Francisco and Pacific company.

In 1865, Spreckels told his partners that he wanted a substantial amount of the company's profits reinvested in doubling the size of the refinery. The partners balked at this plan, preferring their existing comfortable dividends over the immediate loss of income and risk involved in expansion. Claus then quit the company, selling controlling shares to Meese and Meyer, later stating that he preferred to "start afresh rather than being hampered by the conservatism of frightened little men".

=== Building a sugar empire: 1865–1881 ===
Soon after selling his refinery, Spreckels and his family left for an extended stay in Germany. He set about learning the details of the specialized processes of sugar beet agriculture and refining, which were relatively little-known in the United States, even taking a workman's position in a beet sugar refinery in Magdeburg for several months. He returned to California in early 1867, with a supply of sugar beet seeds that he had brought back from Germany. He publicized sugar beet growing to farmers around the Central Valley, promising great profits, but was unable to find growers due to the highly labor-intensive nature of the sugar beet-growing process. He instead set about returning to the cane sugar refining business.

Spreckels opened the California Sugar Refinery, located at Eighth and Brannan Streets in San Francisco, in April 1867. He again partnered with Peter Spreckels and Claus Mangels and brought in new partners Frederick Hagemann and Henry Horstman. However, unlike his previous enterprises, he maintained full controlling interest in the new company. The new refinery benefited from new technologies, including exclusive patents by Spreckels. He introduced granulated sugar and sugar cubes, which had been recently developed in Europe, to the American market. Before these products were introduced, sugar was sold in the form of hard sugarloaves that the consumer had to break up using special tools or pay extra for a grocer to do it. Spreckels's technological innovations also vastly increased his product output, producing as much sugar in one day as his previous refinery had produced in three weeks. With these new products and production capacity, his new company would begin to outpace his competitors, the Bay Sugar Refinery, now in the hands of his former partners, and George Gordon's San Francisco and Pacific Sugar Refinery. (Note: The San Francisco and Pacific Refinery claimed to be the largest sugar refinery in California in 1868, shortly before George Gordon's death. However, in 1874 Spreckels's California Sugar Refinery claimed that status and the San Francisco and Pacific company went out of business some time between 1876 and 1878. Spreckels's former company, the Bay Sugar Refining Company, was destroyed by fire in 1876. It was rebuilt and, under new ownership, operated as the American Sugar Refinery, a small competitor through the 1880s to Spreckels's near-monopoly. In 1888, it was bought out by the similarly-named American Sugar Refining Company, which was the main operation of the Eastern US Sugar Trust. This refinery then played an important role in the battles between Eastern sugar interests and Spreckels's companies.)

This business achievement came at a marked personal cost, however. In 1869, overwork and stress had led to severe burnout and a mental breakdown, characterized by memory loss and other physical and mental symptoms. His doctors advised him to withdraw from all business activity. Spreckels left management of the California Sugar Refinery in the hands of his partners and spent the next 18 months over 1869 and 1870 traveling with his family in Europe. This trip included a course of hydrotherapy at the spa town of Karlsbad, Bohemia. He returned to San Francisco in early 1871 with his health and vigor fully restored.

Spreckels faced additional competition from 1870 to 1873 when E. H. Dyer operated the California Beet Sugar Company, the first successful sugar beet refinery in the United States, across the San Francisco Bay in Alvarado, California. Nevertheless, by 1874, Spreckels's company was claiming to be the largest sugar refinery in California and by 1880, he had a near-monopoly on sugar production in California. Claus Spreckels was hailed in the Hawaiian and California press as the "Sugar King".

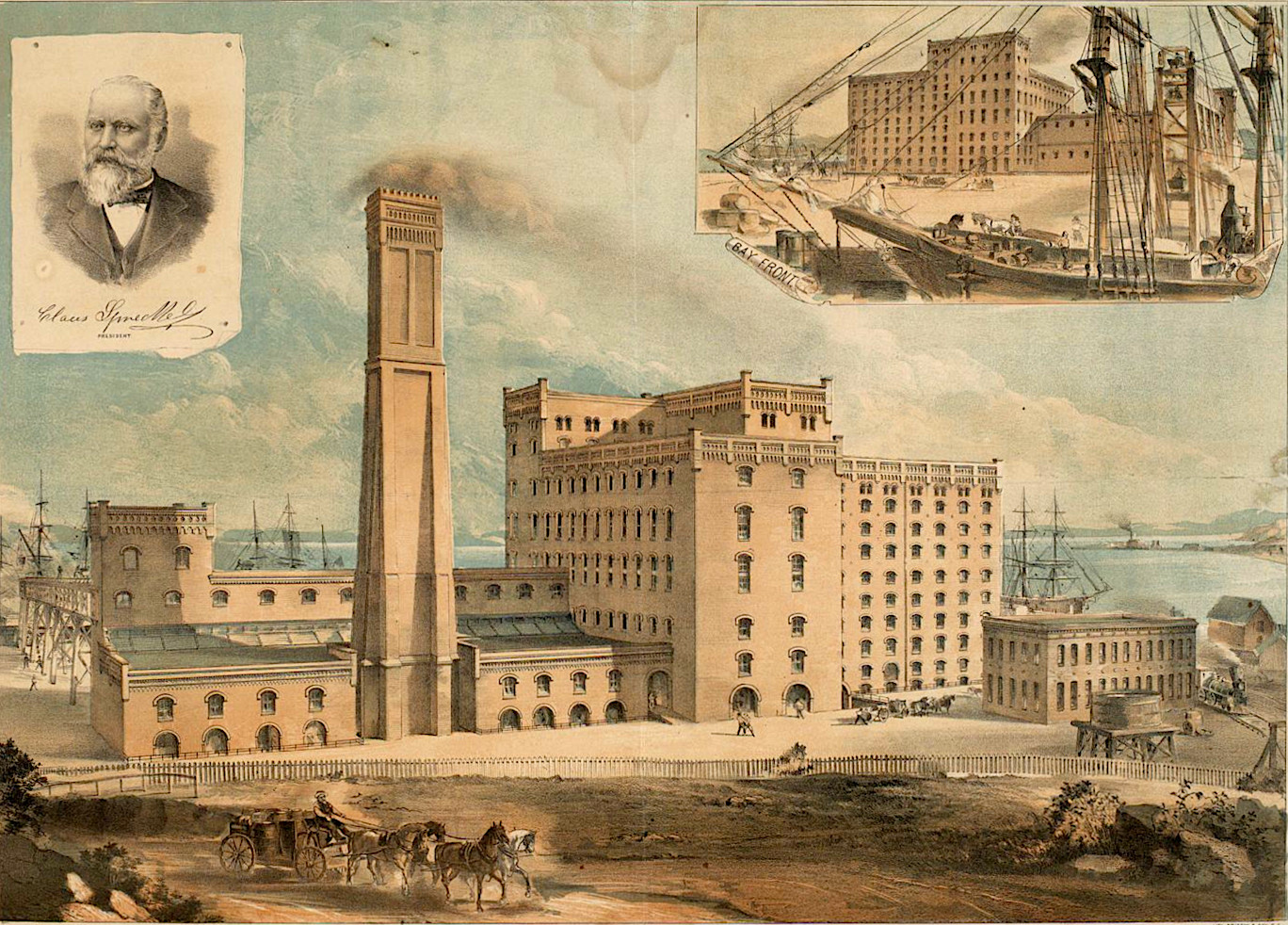
The California Sugar Refinery at Potrero Point in 1881. (Lithograph by Britton & Rey.)

With a steady supply of raw sugar coming from his Hawaiian operations, Spreckels announced that he would be relocating and expanding his refinery. The company purchased six blocks of land in the Potrero Point area in an industrial part of San Francisco several miles south of downtown. The location was strategically located near to where wharf facilities could be built along San Francisco Bay and also near to the Southern Pacific Railroad lines. The enormous twelve-story factory building was completed and began operations in 1881. Spreckels also developed housing and hotel space for over 200 workers, and the new neighborhood at Potreo Point would become the core of the area later known as Dogpatch.

=== Building Santa Cruz County ===
Facing competition from the California Beet Sugar Company in the early 1870s, Spreckels began shopping for land outside of San Francisco where he could further experiment with sugar beet cultivation. In 1872, Rafael de Jesus Castro and his wife Maria Soledad Cota de Castro, the owners of a large portion the former Mexican land grant Rancho Aptos, were undergoing a divorce and needed to liquidate their community property. Learning that the land was for sale, Spreckels quickly made an offer to buy out their property in cash, and soon after bought additional tracts from the Castro's sons, who had been deeded other portions of Rancho Aptos. In all, Spreckels purchased over 550 acres for his estate. In addition to planting sugar beets on a portion of the acreage, he also decided to build a second home on the ranch, allowing the Spreckels family a retreat away from San Francisco. He would go on to build an extensive ranch complex and, later, a large resort hotel.

Spreckels was one of the original investors in the Santa Cruz Railroad, which began operation in 1875 and passed through his land on its run between Santa Cruz and Pajaro, where it connected with the Southern Pacific Railroad line. On the Aptos ranch, Spreckels began to experiment with growing sugar beets. He induced others in the Santa Cruz County to plant sugar beets as well. While sugar beet cultivation would prove economically unfeasible in the area around Aptos and Soquel, it would be more successful further south in the Pajaro Valley, an area that would become important in Spreckels's sugar empire a decade later.

== Sugar King of Hawaii ==
Spreckels' interest in Hawaii's sugar industry began in 1876. Prior to that time, Spreckels had opposed the Reciprocity Treaty of 1875, which increased the Kingdom of Hawaii's access to the American sugar market, because he feared that the low tariffs on Hawaiian sugar would hurt his business. However, Spreckels eventually decided to establish his own plantations in Hawaii and traveled there one year later.

Spreckels became friends with Walter M. Gibson, adviser to King Kalākaua. Together, they made arrangements where Spreckels would lend the king money and in return, Gibson and he would increase the Spreckels' land holdings and water rights.

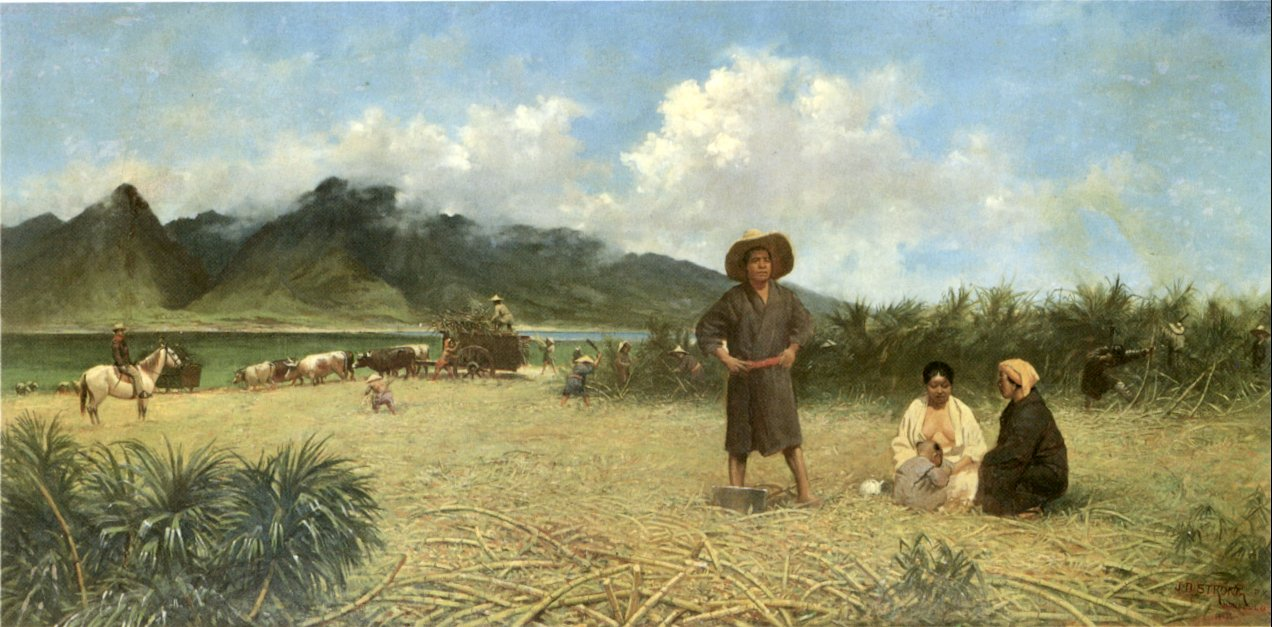
Japanese Laborers on Spreckelsville Plantation, Maui, oil on canvas painting by Joseph Dwight Strong, 1885

In 1878, Spreckels founded Spreckelsville, a company town along the northern shore of Maui. To do so, he purchased and leased 40,000 acres (160 km^{2}) of land. That same year, Spreckels incorporated the Hawaiian Commercial Company with Hermann Schussler, a San Francisco area engineer best known for overseeing construction of the Crystal Springs Reservoir. In 1882, the company was reincorporated as the Hawaiian Commercial and Sugar Company (HC&S). By 1892, Spreckelsville was the largest sugarcane plantation in the world and employed thousands of immigrant farm laborers from Japan, Korea, China, and other countries.

In 1880, he purchased the Pacific Commercial Advertiser and became a newspaper publisher.

In 1881 he partnered with British-Hawaiian planter William G. Irwin to form W. G. Irwin & Co. to handle the Spreckels family interests in Hawaii. Spreckels had also considered George W. Macfarlane, aide-de-camp to King Kalākaua, as a potential associate, but ultimately opted for Irwin. Variations of Irwin's name would be used for other partnership companies with Spreckels. The Oceanic Steamship Company, and J. D. Spreckels and Brothers (sons of Claus), were wholly owned subsidiaries of the Wm. G. Irwin and Co. Ltd. holding company. Among numerous ships built by them was the William G. Irwin barkentine in 1881.

Spreckels & Company was a holding company also known as the Spreckels Bank. Incorporated by Irwin, former California governor Frederick Low and Spreckels, on January 1, 1884, its purpose was to circulate the Kalākaua coinage in Hawaii, and to float loans to the monarchy and government officials. Dissolved by November 1, the partners then funneled their banking activities through William G. Irwin & Co. The only other bank in Hawaii was Bishop & Co., but proliferation of sugar money necessitated that other banks be allowed incorporation. Towards that end, the legislature passed what became known as the Banking Act of 1884, signed into law by Kalākaua on August 11.

Spreckels fell out of Kalākaua's favor in 1886. Both the king and Gibson were in debt to Spreckels due to gambling and tired of his demands. Kalākaua was able to secure a loan from a London creditor and paid off his debt to Spreckels, freeing him of the latter's influence. Nevertheless, Spreckels was a practical royalist, who believed the monarchy's labor importation policies benefited the sugar industry. After the overthrow of the Hawaiian Kingdom, Spreckels found himself at odds over the issue with other planters, and supported Liliʻuokalani's return to the throne. If Hawaii were annexed, the 1882 Chinese Exclusion Act would likely apply to the islands and cut deeply into the plantation labor supply.

In 1893, following a bitter lawsuit that pitted him against his two youngest sons, Gus and Rudolph, Claus Spreckels handed off his Hawaii properties and businesses to William G. Irwin and his two eldest sons, John and Adolph, with the intention of focusing his resources on his beet sugar business in California. Viewed as an enemy of the newly-established Provisional Government of Hawaii, on July 9, 1893, Spreckels found a death threat graffitied on his house and went into self-exile from Hawaii on July 19. He left on the SS Australia, vowing to "return to see grass growing in the streets of Honolulu." Spreckels returned only once to Hawaii, in 1905.

Infighting between his sons and their waning interests in their Hawaiian businesses led to the dissolution of the Spreckels family businesses over the following decades and their takeover by Hawaii's emerging Big Five sugar companies. Following a brief takeover by Gus and Rudolph, the Hawaiian Commercial and Sugar Company and Spreckelsville were taken over by Alexander & Baldwin in 1898, and the remaining Irwin and Spreckels businesses merged into C. Brewer & Co. in 1909.

== Later businesses in California ==
Sensing that his influence in Hawaii was slipping, Spreckels renewed his interest in sugar beet cultivation in California. In 1888, Spreckels established the Western Beet Sugar Company in Watsonville, which was at that time the largest beet sugar factory in the United States. By 1890, his main growing operations had shifted to the Salinas Valley, so he built the 42-mile narrow-gauge Pajaro Valley Consolidated Railroad to ship his sugar beets from the fields near Salinas to Watsonville.

In 1899, Spreckels opened an even larger factory closer to the main sugar-beet fields. He named the new enterprise Spreckels Sugar Company. Spreckels, California, a planned company town, was built nearby, with the first houses designed by noted architect W.H. Weeks, who also designed the factory. Unlike typical company towns, workers were not required to live there and businesses were independently owned rather than company stores.

Spreckels was the president of the San Francisco and San Joaquin Valley Railroad, which was founded in 1895 and sold to the Santa Fe Railway in 1900. The railroad built a line that competed with the Southern Pacific through the San Joaquin Valley between Richmond and Bakersfield. The railroad was welcome competition for shippers who were strangled by Southern Pacific's monopoly on shipping rates in the valley. Today, this route is BNSF's main route to Northern California.

== Controversies ==
Spreckels had an often-contentious relationship with other powerful business figures and interests, both in the United States and in the Kingdom of Hawai'i. This was reflected in frequent negative publicity for Spreckels, particularly in the often yellow press that characterized much of American journalism of that era. One such rivalry would grow into a family enmity between Claus Spreckels and his sons and Charles and M. H. de Young, owners of the San Francisco Chronicle, culminating in the attempted assassination of M. H. de Young by Adolph B. Spreckels in 1884. Allegations by the Chronicle and other critics included the claim that he practiced slavery on his Hawaiian plantations, that he acted as a pimp for King Kalākaua, and that he had defrauded stockholders in his company.

=== Allegations of slavery on Hawaii plantations ===
Like other owners of sugar plantations in Hawaii prior to American annexation, Spreckels employed laborers on the contract labor system, a system having some features of indentured servitude, in which an immigrant laborer contracted to work for a single employer for a set period (typically 3–5 years) for a low wage as repayment for the cost of passage to Hawaii. Spreckels was a strong advocate for continuation of this system, arguing that sugar could not be produced economically without a reliable supply of cheap labor. This led him to oppose the annexation of Hawaii by the United States, something that was supported by many powerful Americans in Hawaii, as the use of contract labor was illegal in the United States under the 1885 Alien Contract Labor Law and other laws.

In the 1880s, the Chronicle began running articles alleging that the laborers on Spreckels plantations were effectively enslaved, that his plantations engaged in unacceptable labor practices, and that the living conditions of the laborers were inhumane, with some of this coverage getting attention in the larger national press. The majority of San Francisco newspapers of the era, however, did not endorse the Chronicle's reporting on the issue, claiming that the labor conditions on Spreckels plantations were acceptable and, in fact, much better than those on sugar plantations in the Caribbean, a position later supported by independent investigations by the Portuguese and Norwegian governments.

Negative publicity about Spreckels Hawaiian operations continued to follow him even after the divestment of his Hawaiian operations in 1893. In 1900, an incident took place in which 114 Puerto Rican migrant laborers were transported to Hawaii under coercive and inhumane conditions. News of the plight of these laborers as they were being transported to California for shipment to Hawaii became a cause célèbre in the American press, particularly in San Francisco. The laborers were recruited and trafficked by labor agents who, according to most accounts, were hired by the Hawaiian Sugar Planters' Association, though some stories linked the agents to Claus Spreckels. John D. Spreckels issued a statement via his newspaper, the San Francisco Call, claiming that neither he nor Claus Spreckels had anything to do with the recruitment of these laborers.

== Illness and death ==
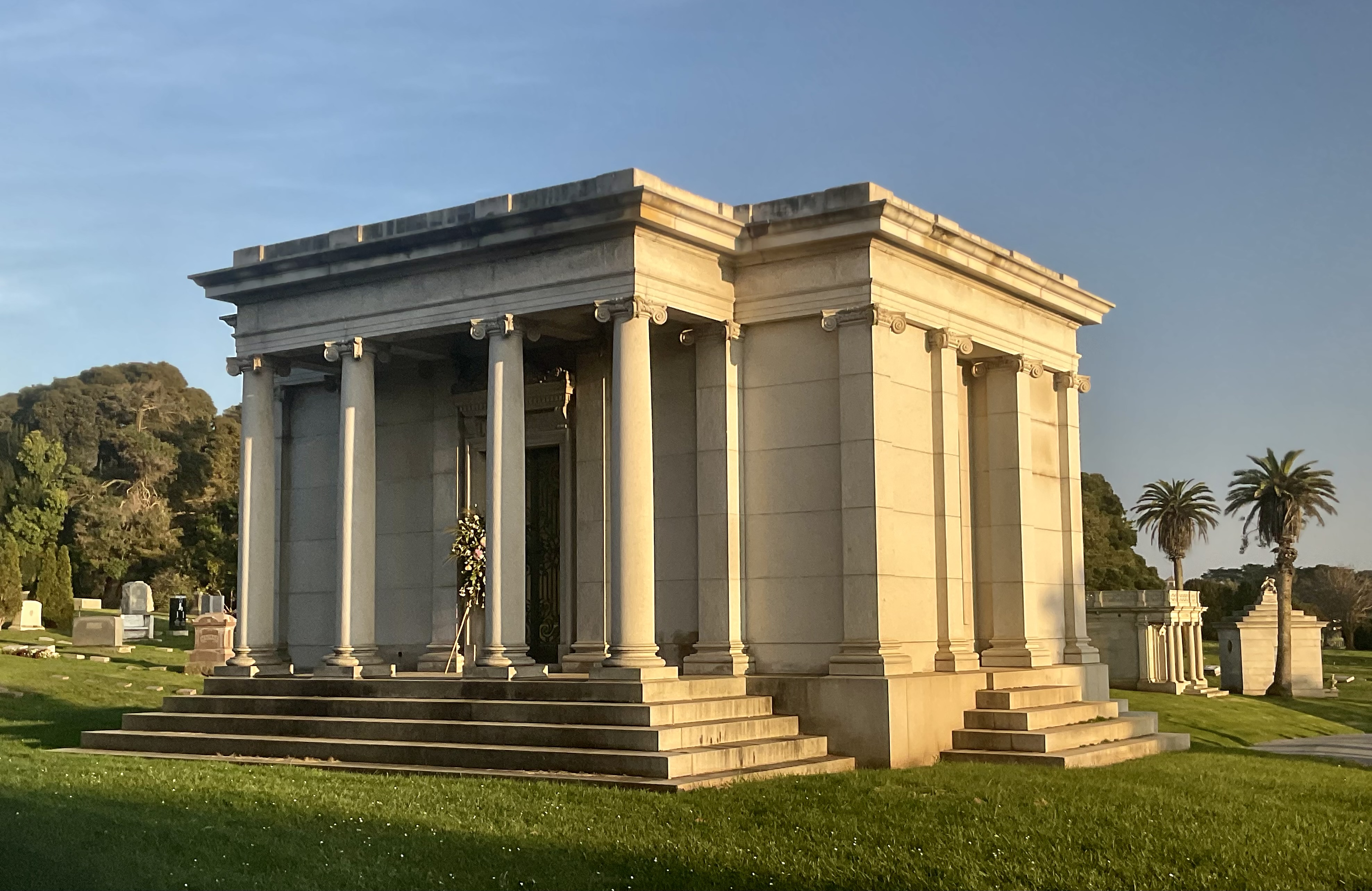
Spreckels Mausoleum at Cypress Lawn Memorial Park

Spreckels began suffering from diabetes in his old age and in 1898, he collapsed from severe complications of diabetes. In late 1903, he suffered from a series of strokes that temporarily left him unable to speak.

In December 1908, Claus Spreckels developed a common cold, which in his weakened condition gave way to pneumonia, and he died in his San Francisco home on December 26, 1908. He is interred in the Spreckels Mausoleum at Cypress Lawn Memorial Park in Colma. His second son, Adolph, and his daughter-in-law, Alma de Bretteville Spreckels, were later interred there after their deaths.

== Legacy ==
=== Family ===
All four of Claus Spreckels sons would go on to become prominent figures in the American sugar industry, as well as other industries such as railroads, shipping, municipal transportation, and real estate development. His eldest son, John D. Spreckels became notable in his own right for his business empire and his critical role in the development of the city of San Diego. His daughter-in-law Alma de Bretteville Spreckels was a noted philanthropist who was nicknamed "The Great Grandmother of San Francisco" and was instrumental in the creation of the San Francisco's California Palace of the Legion of Honor museum. Direct, indirect, and in-law descendants of Claus Spreckels have left their mark in areas as varied as surfing, philanthropy, art patronage, German politics, and winemaking. The Rosekrans family of San Francisco, direct descendents of Claus Spreckels through his second son Adolph, continued to be a socially prominent family in the Bay Area into the 21st century.

=== Businesses ===
The majority of the businesses assets of his eldest two sons, including the Spreckels Sugar Company, was held in common in the J. D. and A. B. Spreckels Company, which continued to be a source of wealth for their heirs for several decades after their deaths in the 1920s. The J. D. and A. B. Spreckels Company was liquidated in the late 1940s and the proceeds divided among the many heirs.

Upon Claus Spreckels's death, his son Adolph assumed the management of Spreckels Sugar Company. The company remained under control of Claus Spreckels descendants until a 1949 buyout by Charles de Bretteville, a nephew of Adolph's wife, Alma de Bretteville Spreckels. Charles de Bretteville sold controlling interest in the company in 1963 to the American Sugar Company, which already had held 50% stock in Spreckels Sugar since Claus Spreckels settlement with the eastern Sugar Trust. The company was last operated as a wholly-owned subsidiary of the Southern Minnesota Beet Sugar Cooperative (SMBSC) and operated its sole remaining beet sugar factory in Brawley, California in the Imperial Valley, the last remaining beet sugar factory in California. In April 2025, SMBSC announced that they would be decommissioning the Imperial Valley refinery and close the Spreckels Sugar division. The company ended operations soon after the end of the sugar beet harvest in summer 2025.

The original Spreckels Sugar Factory in the Salinas Valley continued to operate after Spreckels death. The town of Spreckels, California and the sugar factory were important in the early life of novelist John Steinbeck, and several scenes from his novels take place there. The factory continued to operate until 1982. Although it was considered to be a historically important structure, it was demolished in 1992 after being damaged beyond repair in the 1989 Loma Prieta earthquake. The town still stands and is considered one of the best-preserved examples of a former company town in California.

The Hawaiian Commercial and Sugar Company (HC&S) continued operation as a division of Alexander & Baldwin (A&B) for over a century after Spreckels left the company. In 1902, HC&S closed the Spreckelsville mill and moved its main operations to Puʻunene. Later in the century, A&B would sell of the valuable coastal land on which Spreckelsville was situated for real estate development and the unincorporated community of Spreckelsville still exists as a community. The original California HC&S corporation incorporated by Spreckels and Schussler in 1878 was formally dissolved and then reincorporated in Hawaii in 1926. The company shut down operations entirely in 2016, by which time it had been the last remaining sugar producer in Hawaii.

=== Places ===
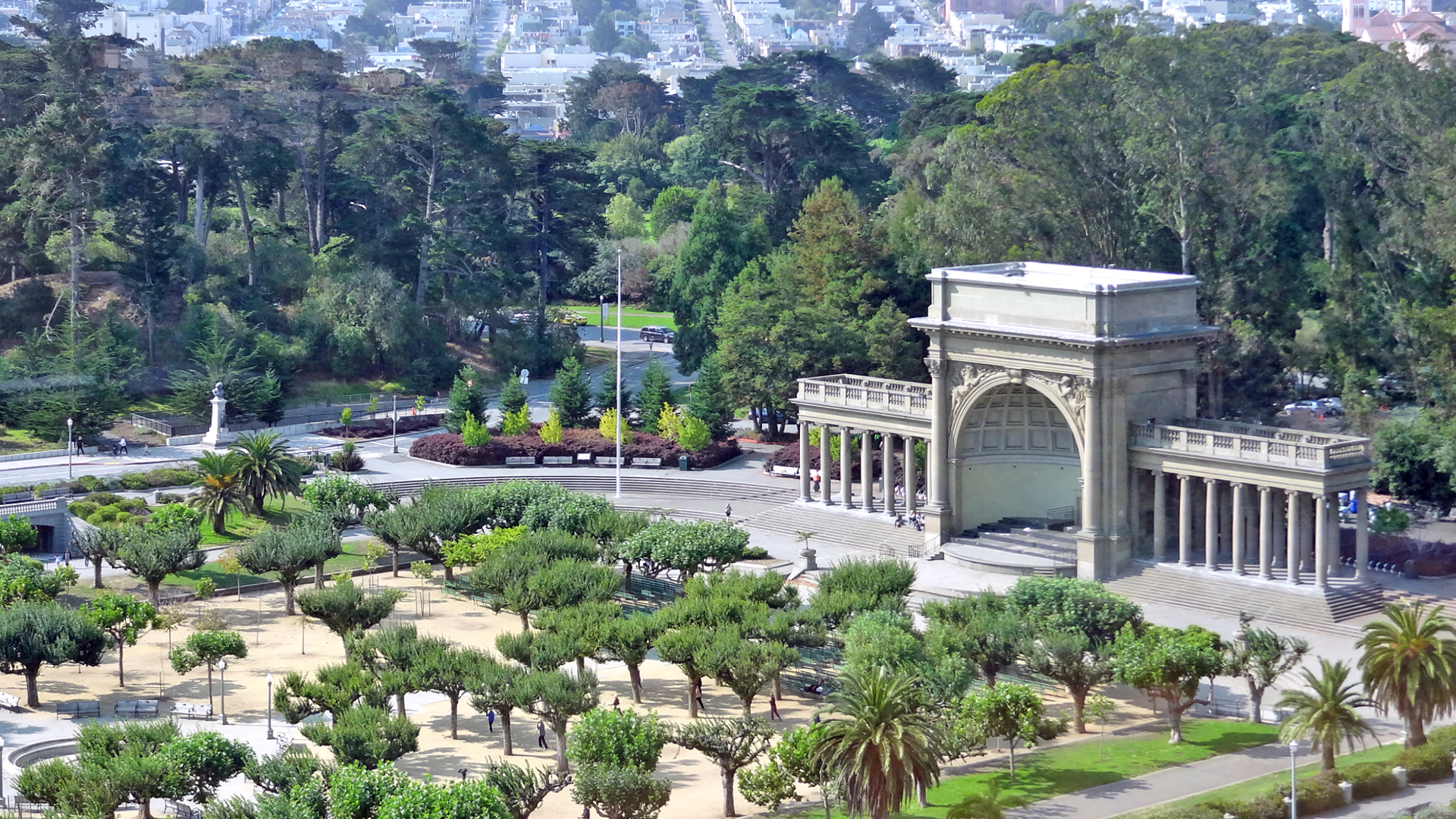
Spreckels Temple of Music in Golden Gate Park, San Francisco

In 1899, Spreckels gave the city of San Francisco a classical-style outdoor music structure (known as "the bandshell") to frame one end of the Music Concourse in Golden Gate Park. The official name of the structure is the Spreckels Temple of Music.

Several place names in Aptos and Rio del Mar, California are named for Claus Spreckels or for parts of his once-extensive estate. Claus Court, which is a cul-de-sac running off of Spreckels Drive, is the former site of his Aptos Hotel. Polo Grounds Park was once Spreckels' polo field, while the Deer Park area, now a small shopping center, was once the estate's hunting preserve.

A number of streets elsewhere also take their name from Claus Spreckels or Spreckels Sugar Company. In addition to the aforementioned streets in Aptos named for him, there are streets and roads bearing his name in downtown Honolulu and in or near the California cities of Spreckels, King City, and Manteca. A historic Spreckels Sugar Company farmhouse built in 1898 sits on the grounds of the Monterey County Agricultural and Rural Life Museum in King City, having been moved there in 1980 from the company's Ranch Number One near the town of Spreckels.
