= Music Concourse =

Historic site in San Francisco, California, U.S.

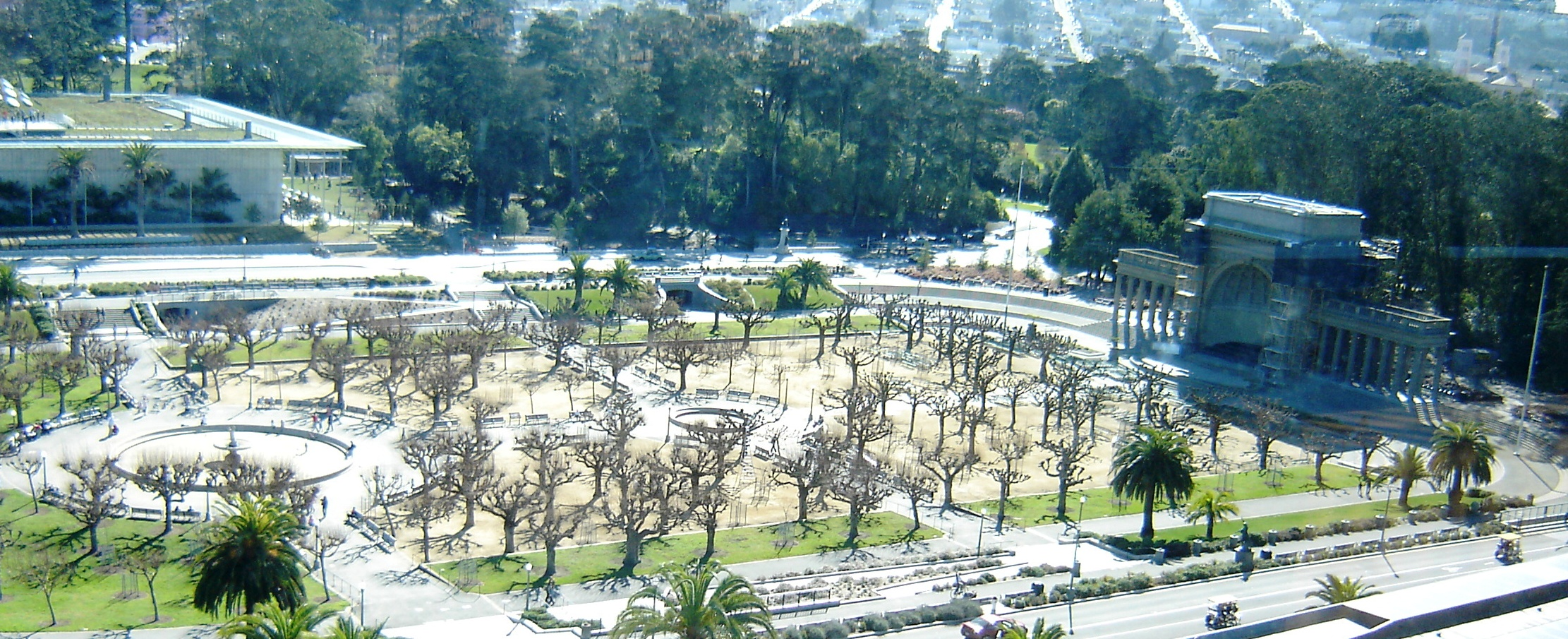
- The Spreckels Temple of Music is the focal point of one end of the Music Concourse. Heavily pollarded trees cover the oval-shaped bowl.
- Interactive map of Music Concourse
- Location: Golden Gate Park in San Francisco
- Coordinates: 37.7706°N 122.4675°W

San Francisco Designated Landmark
- Designated: December 16, 2005
- Reference no.: 249

The Music Concourse is an open-air plaza within Golden Gate Park in San Francisco. Flanking the oval-shaped concourse are the M. H. de Young Memorial Museum and the California Academy of Sciences.

== History ==
Originally excavated for the California Midwinter International Exposition of 1894, it underwent a significant redesign after the fair in order to be repurposed as a venue for public gatherings centered on music performances.

The focal point of the plaza, Spreckels Temple of Music, also called the "Bandshell", was a gift to the city from sugar magnate Claus Spreckels. The structure was built in 1899, in advance of the Music Concourse's completion in 1900. It was severely damaged in the 1906 and 1989 earthquakes, has repeatedly undergone extensive renovation, and has served as a stage for numerous performers over the years ranging from Luciano Pavarotti to the Grateful Dead. It has for decades been the venue for annual celebrations of the anniversary of the Polish Constitution of May 3, 1791.

In the 2000s an extensive renovation of the Music Concourse and construction of new buildings for the two museums was performed, together with the installation of an 800-car underground parking garage, which opened in 2005. The Music Concourse, including the bowl itself plus the surrounding land containing the statues, was named a San Francisco Designated Landmark in December 2006.

The SkyStar Wheel arrived from Cincinnati, Ohio on March 15, 2020, and completed assembly on March 21 as an attraction to celebrate Golden Gate Park's 150th anniversary. While that celebration was cancelled due to the COVID-19 pandemic, the observation wheel opened on October 21, 2020, under a one-year contract. The contract was later extended an additional year to help the operator recoup their lost costs from the pandemic. It closed on October 22, 2023, and relocated to nearby Fisherman's Wharf.

== Features ==
Three fountains line the center of the plaza with a fourth at the top of a staircase adjacent to the bowl. The plaza is planted with many trees laid out in a regular grid array. The trees, mostly London plane and Scotch elm, are heavily pollarded to give a very regular and formal appearance to the plaza.

Numerous statuary dot the area, including representations of Leonidas, the King of Sparta who defeated the Persians in the Battle Thermopylie, Ulysses S. Grant, Ludwig van Beethoven, Giuseppe Verdi, and Junípero Serra. At the opposite end of the Music Concourse from the Bandshell is a monument dedicated to Francis Scott Key, though this was not its original location, having been moved to this spot in 1967.

Several pedestrian tunnels lead from surrounding areas directly into the bowl.

== Gallery ==
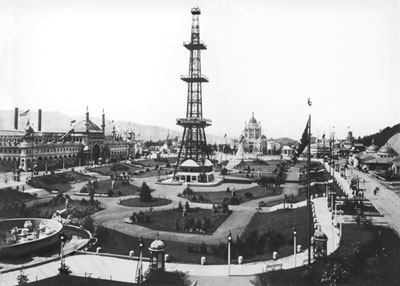
The Concourse at the 1894 California Midwinter Exposition

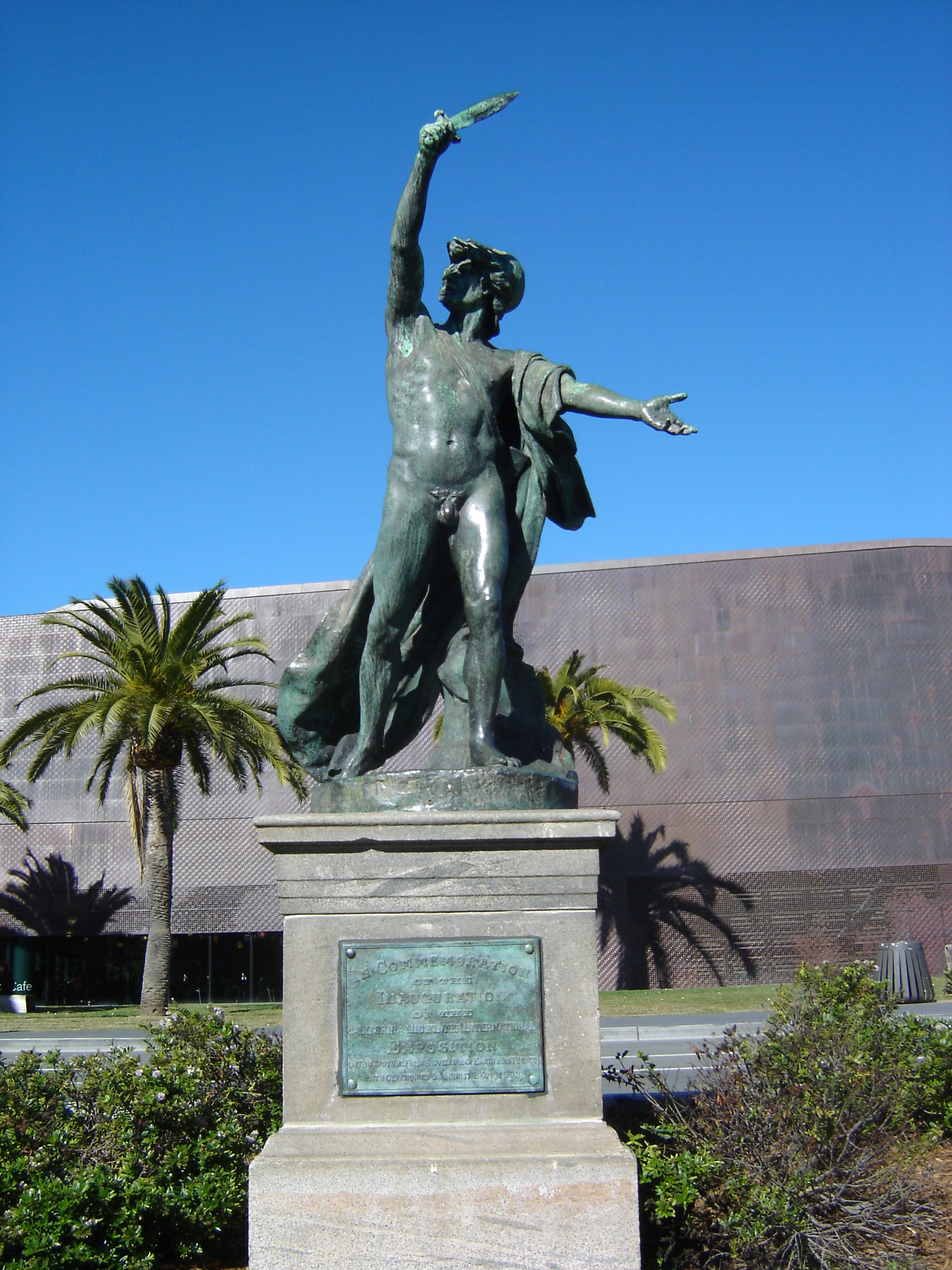
Leonidas, King of Sparta, who defeated the Persians at Thermopylae (it is often misidentified as a Roman gladiator) commemorates the excavation of the Music Concourse in 1893.

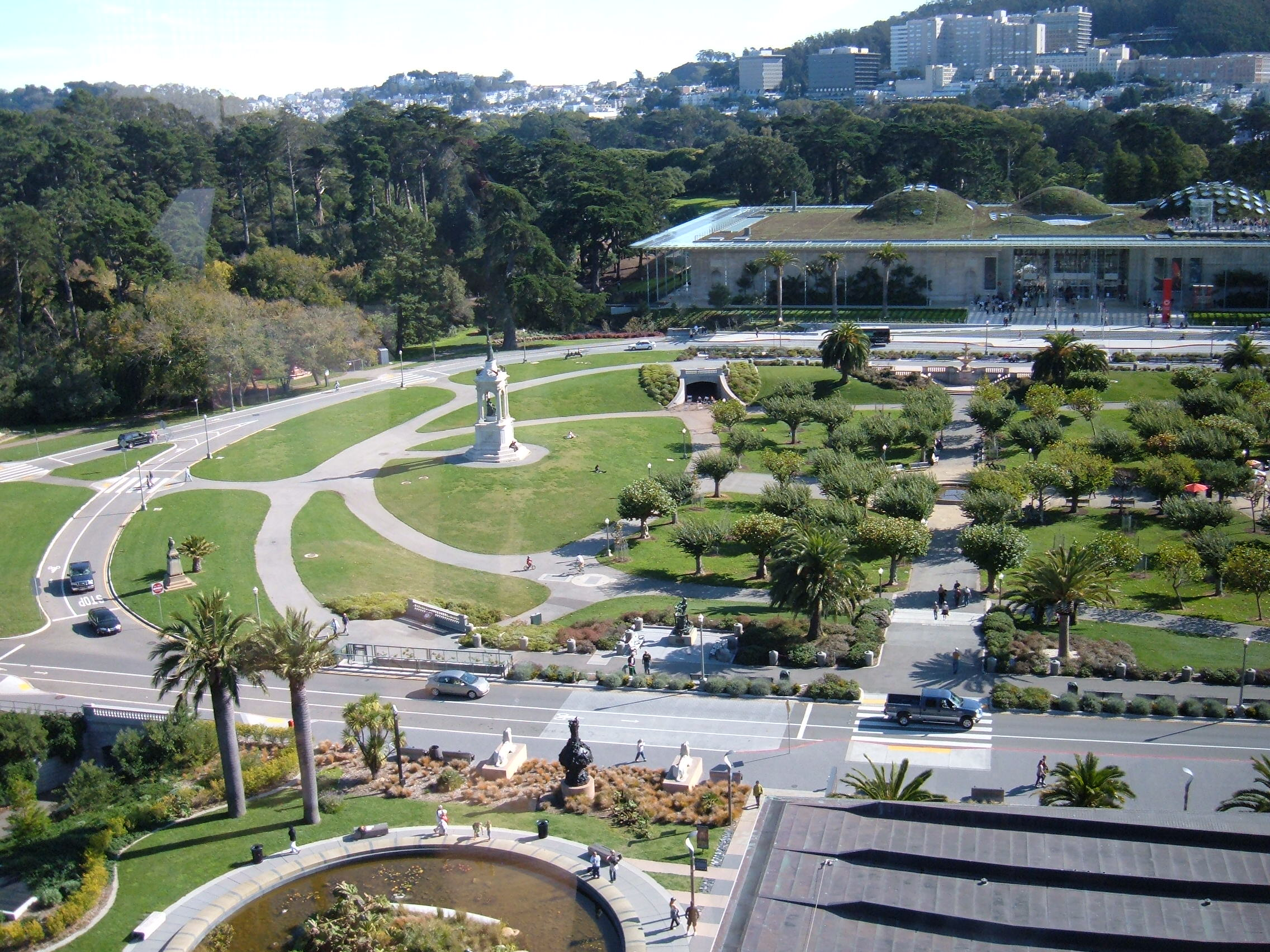
The northern end of the Concourse after the most recent renovations, as seen from the de Young Museum in 2009.

== See also ==
- List of San Francisco Designated Landmarks
