= Alioto's =

Historic restaurant in San Francisco

Coordinates: 37.808700°N 122.416084°W

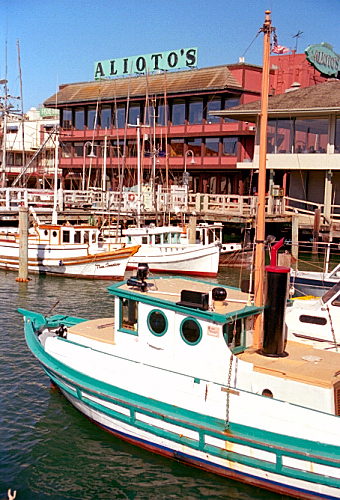
- Alioto's in 2008
- Interactive map of Alioto's

Restaurant information
- Established: 1925
- Closed: March 2020
- Food type: Seafood
- Location: 6 Fisherman's Wharf, San Francisco, California, United States

Alioto's Restaurant was a historic Italian fish restaurant located at San Francisco's Fisherman's Wharf.

== History ==
Alioto's began in 1925 as a fish stand, operated by Sicilian immigrant Nunzio Alioto, Sr. In 1932, with business at his Stall #8 doing well, Alioto built the first building on Fisherman's Wharf and began selling crab and shrimp cocktails. After his death in 1933, his widow Rose Alioto and their children succeeded him, opening a full restaurant in 1938 and later expanding it into the adjacent building. The family claim that Rose Alioto was the originator of cioppino. The restaurant was destroyed by fire in 1957 but was reconstructed. King Harald and Queen Sonja of Norway dined there in 1995.

As of July 2013, Alioto's remained a family-run restaurant, with a great-grandson of the founder, Matthew Violante, as general manager. It closed in March 2020 during the COVID-19 pandemic and did not reopen. Its permanent closure was announced in April 2022.

The restaurant had a 66-year lease from the Port of San Francisco, expiring in 2036, but large seafood restaurants are now less popular and the building needs expensive renovations for safety. In June 2025, after failing to find new tenants for Alioto's and two other restaurants at Fisherman's Wharf that did not reopen after the pandemic, the Port announced that Alioto's will be demolished to create a public plaza with views of the fishing fleet anchored in the lagoon.
