= Fisherman's Wharf, San Francisco =

Neighborhood in San Francisco, California

Fisherman's Wharf
- Neighborhood of San Francisco
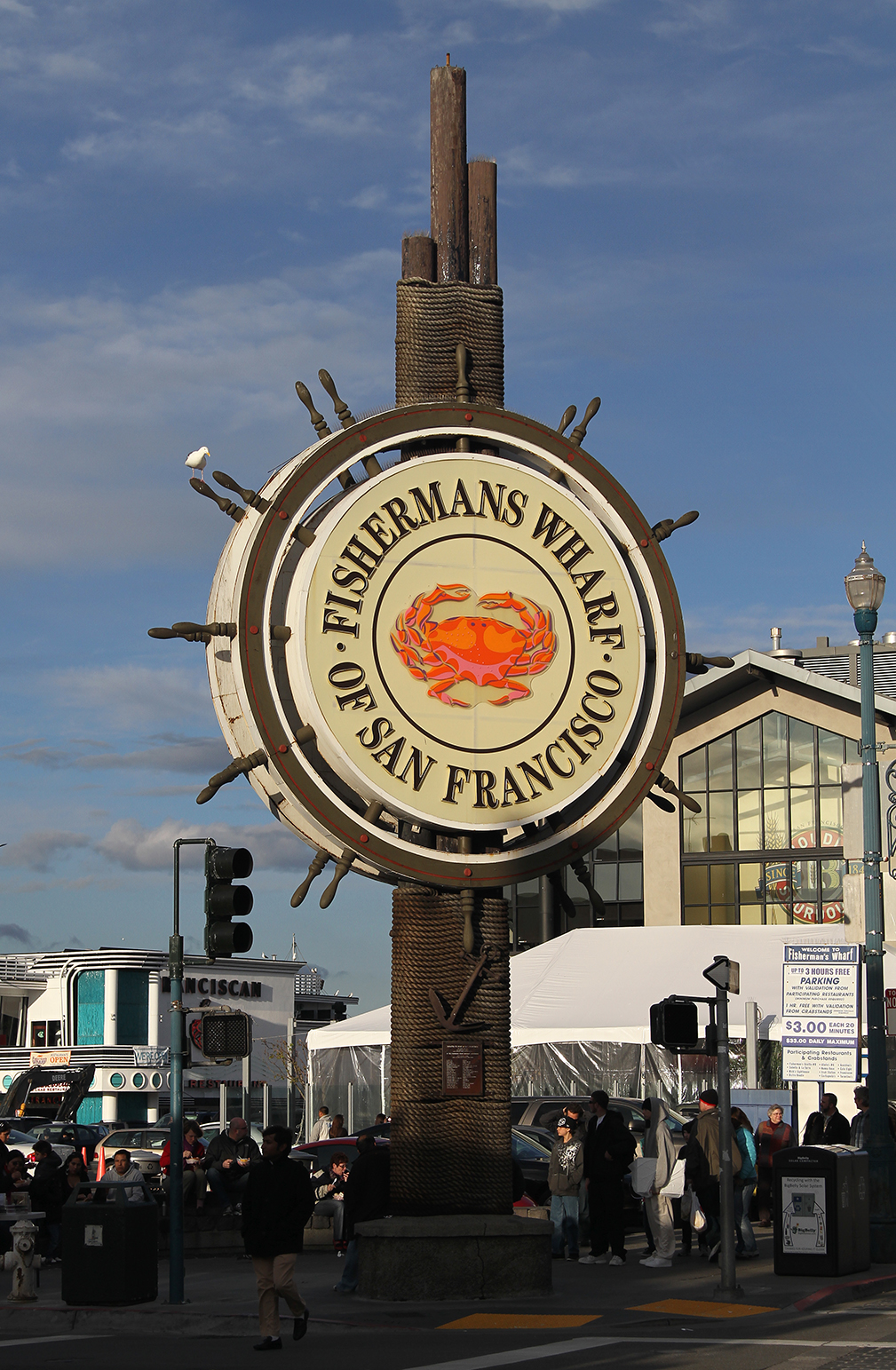
- Fisherman's Wharf sign

- Location within Central San Francisco
- Coordinates: 37°48′30″N 122°24′56″W
- Country: United States
- State: California
- City: City and County of San Francisco

Fisherman's Wharf is a neighborhood and tourist attraction in San Francisco, located in the northern part of the city's waterfront. The Aquatic Park Historic District is often considered to be part of Fisherman's Wharf, though some neighborhood descriptions treat it as a separate area. Historically a working fishing port which also had seafood restaurants that were a draw to outsiders, the fishing docks declined during the 1960s and 1970s while tourist development became dominant.

== Location ==
Most narrowly, the name Fisherman's Wharf describes the "tourist trap" area on the waterfront along Jefferson Street and adjacent streets, as well as Pier 39.

More broadly, it refers to the larger neighborhood north of Bay Street, spanning from Pier 35 and the intersection of The Embarcadero and Bay Street westward to Hyde Street and Aquatic Park, or further west to Van Ness Avenue, which runs parallel to the high wall separating the area from Fort Mason. The neighborhood lies to the north of Russian Hill, North Beach, and Telegraph Hill. To the southeast beyond Pier 35, the San Francisco Waterfront is continued by the North Waterfront district.

The Fisherman’s Wharf Community Benefit District, a local business association, defines the area more narrowly, defining the area as spanning from the intersections of The Embarcadero and North Point Street and Powell and Bay Streets west- and northward to Columbus Avenue and Aquatic Park, with an extension along a strip of Beach Street that includes Ghirardelli Square, as far west as Van Ness Avenue.

== History ==
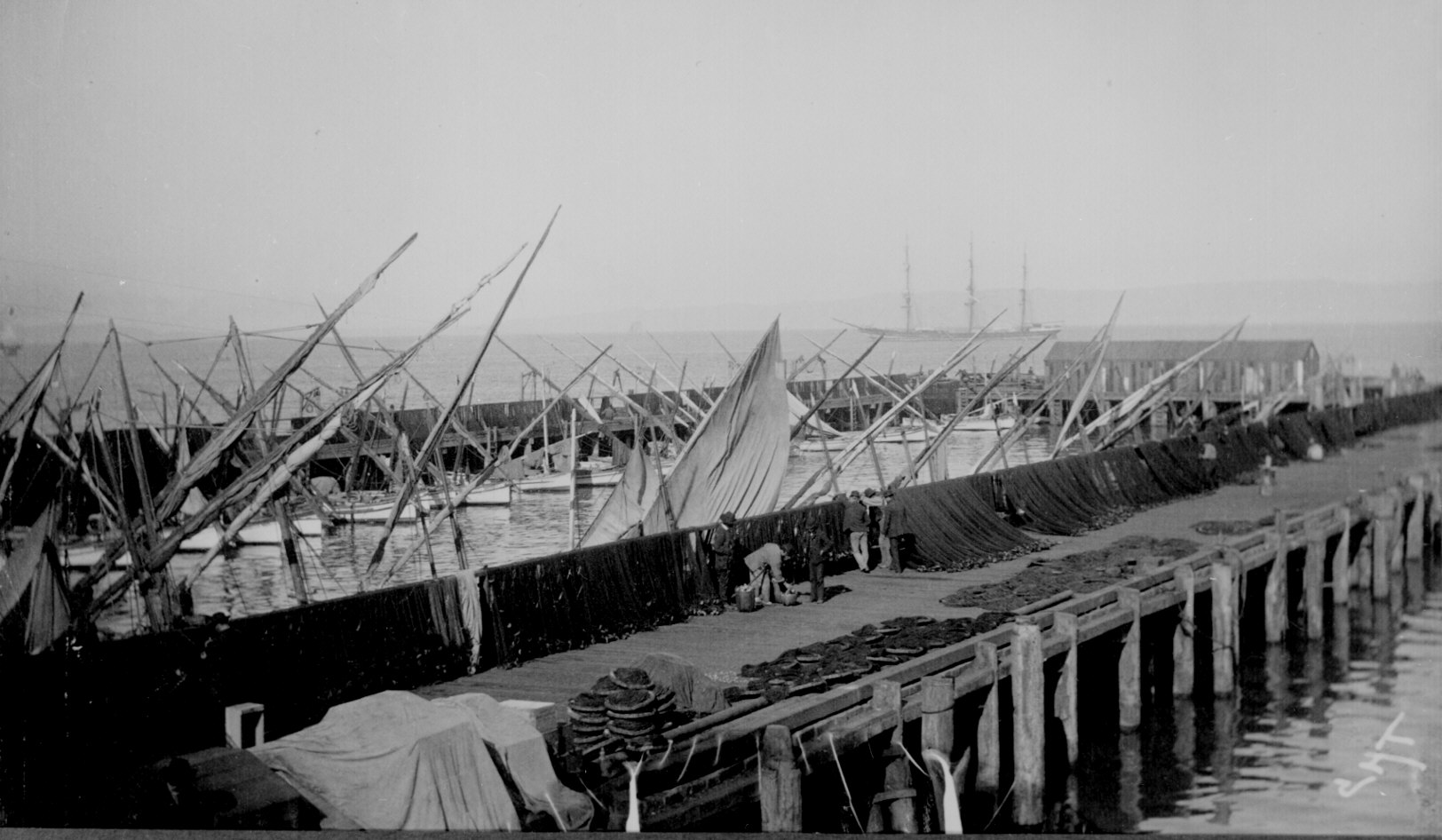
Feluccas at Fisherman's Wharf at the foot of Union Street, circa 1891

In 1884, the first state-owned Fisherman's Wharf was built at the foot of Union Street, jutting out from the shore on a north by northeast angle, comprising a long narrow rectangle about 450 feet long and 150 feet wide, with an entrance along the leeward eastern side.

In 1900, the state of California set aside the waterfront between the foot of Taylor and Leavenworth streets for commercial fishing boats. Despite its redevelopment into a tourist attraction during the 1970s and 1980s, the area was still home to many active fishermen and their fleets.

In 2010, a $15 million development plan was proposed by city officials hoping to revitalize its appearance for tourists, and to reverse the area's downward trend in popularity among San Francisco residents.

== Attractions and characteristics ==
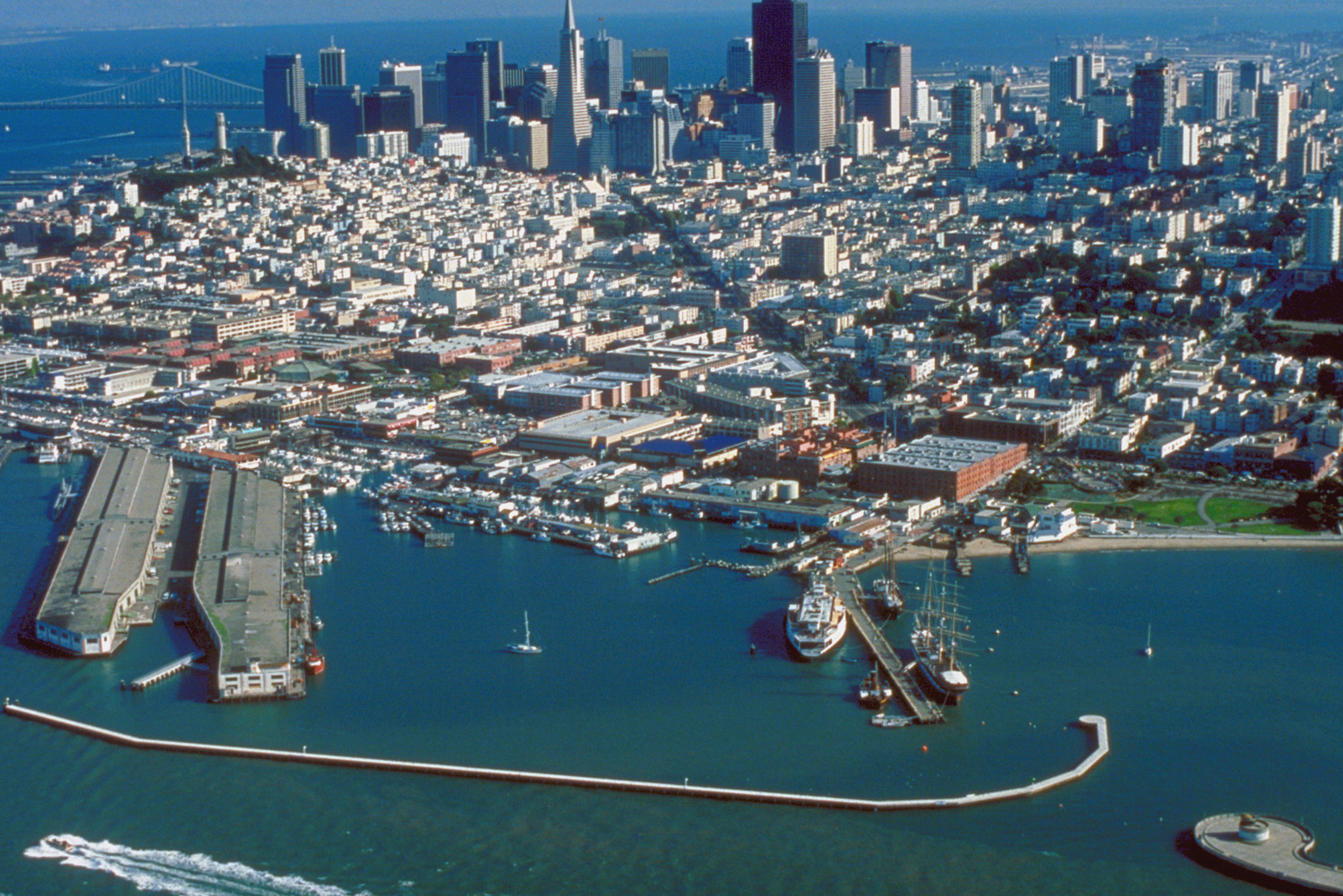
Aerial view of San Francisco, looking south, with Fisherman's Wharf just left of center, directly above a lone sailboat

One of the busiest and well known tourist attractions in the western United States, Fisherman's Wharf is best known for being the location of Pier 39, the Cannery Shopping Center, Ghirardelli Square, a Ripley's Believe it or Not museum, the Musée Mécanique, Madame Tussauds, and the San Francisco Maritime National Historical Park.

Seafood restaurants are plentiful in the area, including the floating Forbes Island restaurant at Pier 39 to stands that serve fresh seafood. Some of the restaurants, including Fishermen's Grotto, Pompei's Grotto and Alioto's, go back for three generations of the same family ownership. Other restaurants include chains like Applebee's and Bubba Gump Shrimp Co. The area also has an In-N-Out Burger; local business leaders said they opposed every other fast food chain except In-N-Out, because they wanted to maintain the flavor of family-owned, decades-old businesses in the area, with one saying locals would ordinarily "be up in arms about a fast-food operation coming to Fisherman's Wharf," but the family-owned In-N-Out "is different."

Other attractions in Fisherman's Wharf area are the Hyde Street Pier (part of the San Francisco Maritime National Historical Park), the USS Pampanito, a decommissioned World War II submarine, and the Balclutha, a 19th-century full-rigged cargo ship. Nearby Pier 45 has a chapel in memory of the "Lost Fishermen" of San Francisco and Northern California.

On November 13, 2023, the SkyStar Wheel began operations in Fisherman's Wharf after spending three years in the nearby Music Concourse within Golden Gate Park. Its opening coincided with the 2023 Asia-Pacific Economic Cooperation summit.

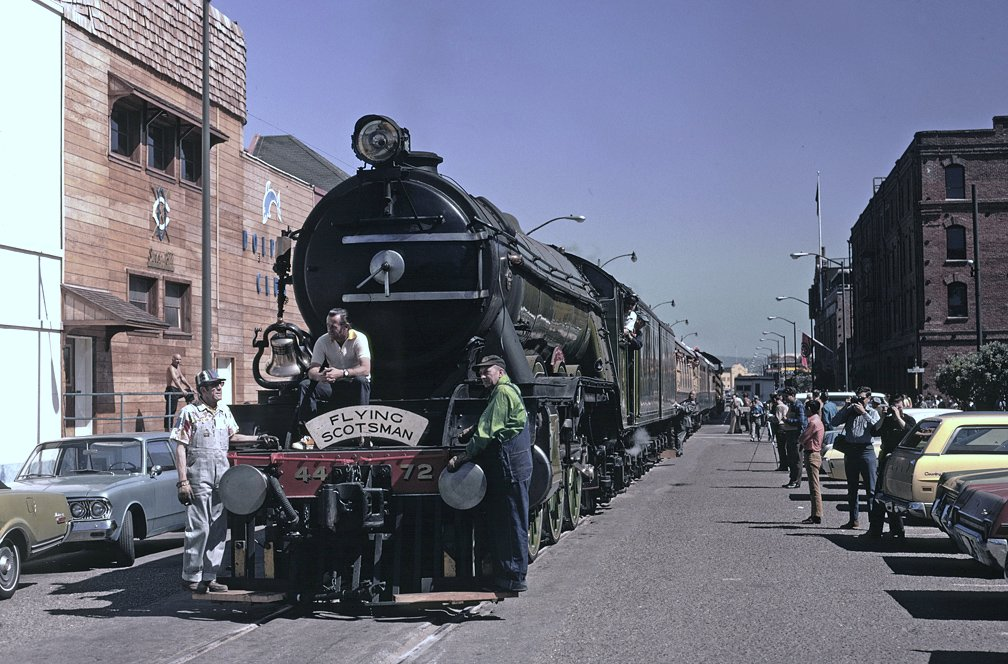
Flying Scotsman on State Belt Railroad track, at Fisherman's Wharf, in 1972

Pier 39 is home to a sea lion colony. The animals started to occupy the area after the Loma Prieta earthquake in 1989 taking over the wooden floating docks that were originally used for berthing boats.

Fisherman's Wharf plays host to many San Francisco events, including a firework display on the Fourth of July and some of the best views of the Fleet Week air shows featuring The Blue Angels.

=== Pier 45 ===
The USS Pampanito (SS-383) and the Liberty ship SS Jeremiah O'Brien are National Historic Landmarks, preserved as a memorial and museum ships as part of the San Francisco Maritime National Historical Park located near the Wharf.

=== Residential areas and other neighborhood features ===
Although the Fisherman's Wharf area is best known primarily for tourist attractions and tourist-oriented businesses, the southern and eastern portions of the neighborhood contain residential areas and neighborhood businesses. The NorthPoint development, consisting of a shopping center and several blocks of apartment buildings, is located along North Point and Bay Streets from Mason to Stockton Street. The area also included the Northpoint Theatre, which operated from 1967 to 1997. It had one of the largest screens in the city at the time and was selected by George Lucas for early screenings of American Graffiti, Star Wars, and The Empire Strikes Back.

The original Cost Plus Imports store, which later expanded into the World Market chain, was located at Taylor and Bay Streets and was a significant draw to the area for tourists and locals alike. It served as the company's flagship store during the company's early decades. The location was later reduced in floor size and shut down entirely in 2020. Tower Records operated a flagship store at Bay Street and Columbus, and was an iconic location in San Francisco for many years before the store's closing along with the rest of the Tower Records chain in 2006. Williams-Sonoma, Inc. has its world headquarters at the foot of Van Ness Avenue across from Aquatic Park and also operates another office building at 100 North Point Street near The Embarcadero.

One of the campuses of the art school Academy of Art University is located on Stockton Street between Beach and North Point Streets, one of a number of locations around San Francisco where Academy of Art conducts classes. In 2019, University of California, San Francisco acquired the 2001 The Embarcadero building as a gift. It is currently refurbishing the building and is planning to use it as an office space for its some of its administrative departments.

== Transportation ==
The area is served by several lines of historic cable cars and streetcars run by the San Francisco Municipal Railway (Muni). The Powell / Hyde cable car line has its northern terminus at Aquatic Park, while that of the Powell / Mason cable car line is Bay and Mason Streets. The cable cars journey over Russian and Nob Hills and have their southern terminus at Powell and Market Streets in downtown San Francisco. The cable cars have served the area for many decades, with the Powell / Mason line dating to 1888, while the Powell / Hyde line was added in 1957 after the decline of several older cable car routes elsewhere in the city.

In 2000, Muni added several lines of heritage streetcars as part of a larger redevelopment of The Embarcadero. These were the E Embarcadero of and F Market lines which routed from Fisherman's Wharf through the northern Embarcadero, from the southern Embarcadero and Market Street, respectively. E Embarcadero service was terminated in 2020 during the COVID-19 pandemic, and as of 2025, it has not been revived. There are ongoing plans to extend the streetcar lines through an old tunnel running underneath Fort Mason and extend the streetcar lines out to the Fort Mason piers near the Marina District.

Muni also runs its several regular bus routes to the area, and Fisherman's Wharf is the northern terminus for several crosstown routes.

The Blue & Gold Fleet offers ferry service from Pier 39 to the Sausalito Ferry Terminal. Until the early 2020s, more extensive ferry service ran from Pier 41, with service to destinations like Tiburon, Angel Island, and Vallejo.

== In popular culture ==
The 1939 film, Fisherman's Wharf is an early example of a film set in this area. Numerous other films have used Fisherman's wharf as a filming location, notably, the 1962 film noir Experiment in Terror and the 1985 James Bond film A View to a Kill. Fisherman's Wharf was also a frequent location for the 1970s police drama television series The Streets of San Francisco.

The cover photos for Van Dyke Parks' music album Clang of the Yankee Reaper (1976) were taken by Ed Thrasher at Fisherman's Wharf.

== See also ==
- Fisherman's Wharves
- 49-Mile Scenic Drive
- Red & White Fleet bay cruises
