= SkyStar Wheel =

Ferris wheel in Fisherman's Wharf, San Francisco, California, United States

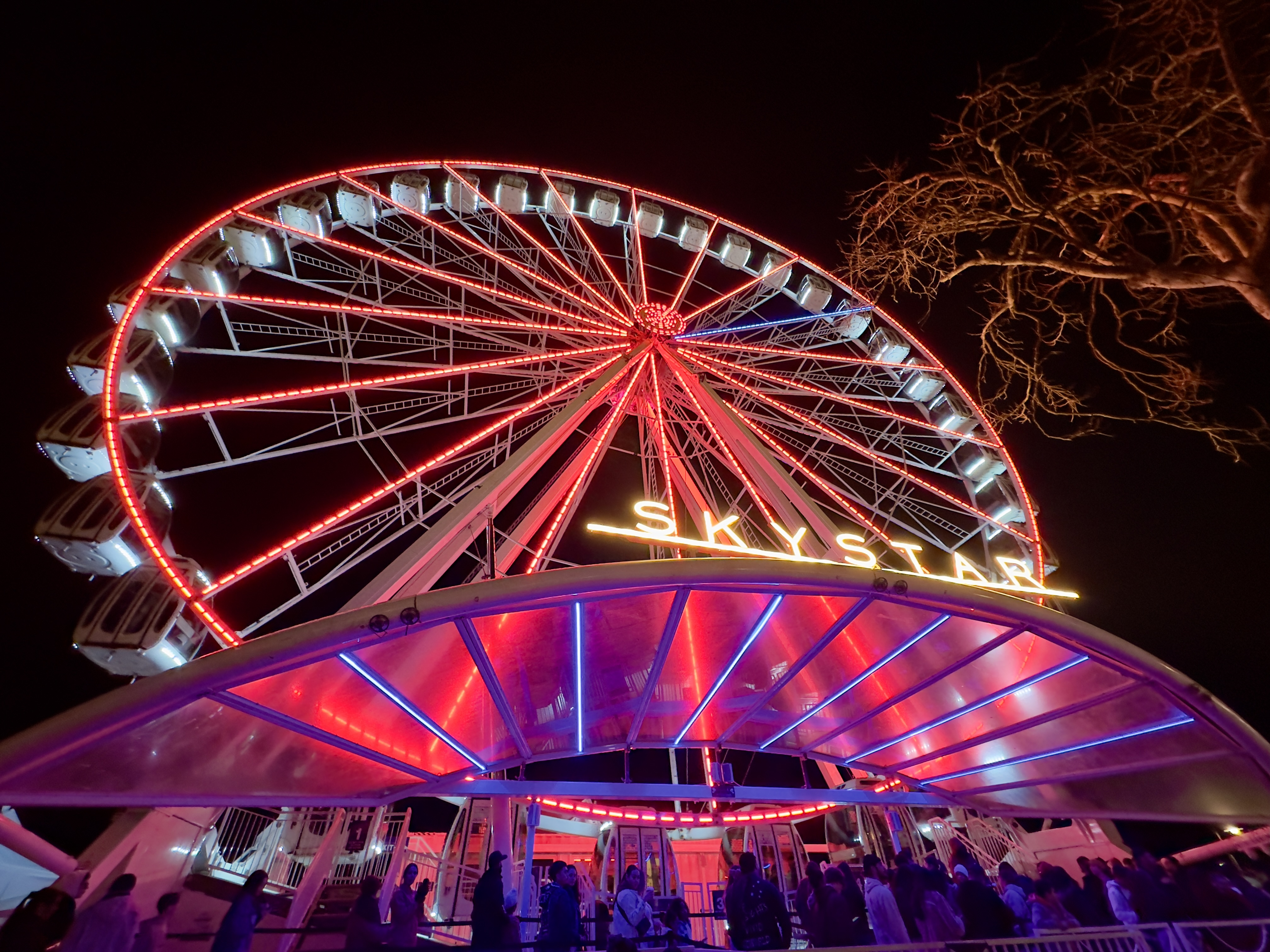
- SkyStar Wheel while located in Fisherman's Wharf in January 2024

General information
- Status: Operating
- Type: Observation wheel
- Location: Fisherman's Wharf, 2860 Taylor Street, San Francisco, United States
- Coordinates: 37.808606°N 122.413489°W
- Opened: March 29, 2018
- Owner: SkyView Partners

Height
- Height: 150 feet (45.7 m)

Dimensions
- Diameter: 137 feet (41.8 m)

Design and construction
- Engineer: Mondial World of Rides

Other information
- Seating capacity: 215

Website
- Official website

SkyStar Wheel is a 150-foot-tall (45.7 m), 137-foot-diameter (41.8 m) traveling observation wheel located in San Francisco's Fisherman's Wharf since November 13, 2023. It has previously operated in San Francisco's Music Concourse (2020–2023), Cincinnati's The Banks (2018–2020), Louisville's Waterfront Park (2018), and Norfolk (2018).

== Design ==
SkyStar Wheel is a 150-foot-tall (45.7 m), 137-foot-diameter (41.8 m) traveling observation wheel. It includes over one million colored LED lights.

The wheel has a total of 36 climate-controlled gondolas. There are 35 handicap accessible general admission gondolas which holds up to six guests. As well as one non-handicap accessible VIP gondola with leather seats and hardwood floors which holds up to five guests. An average ride lasts for twelve minutes.

It was designed by SkyView Partners and Mondial World of Rides.

== Operations ==
The observation wheel is owned and operated by SkyView Partners, a company based in St. Louis, Missouri.

== History ==
The ride first opened on March 29, 2018, in Louisville, Kentucky's Waterfront Park for the 2018 Kentucky Derby, Thunder Over Louisville, and Waterfront Wednesday season opener. It remained open until May 6, 2018. The base rent paid by the operator to the park was US$25,000 or 5% of gross profits, whichever was greater.

It moved to the Waterside District in downtown Norfolk, Virginia, and opened on May 19, 2018, where it operated until August 19, 2018.

The wheel was scheduled to open at the Banks alongside the Ohio River in Cincinnati, Ohio, on August 31, 2018, but was delayed until September 1, 2018, due to weather. It opened to help celebrate the Banks' ten-year anniversary and was located across from the National Underground Railroad Freedom Center. The wheel remained open at this location until March 1, 2020. On July 2, 2019, it was announced that the owners planned to return to the area and install a permanent 180-foot-tall (54.9 m) observation wheel set to open by March 5, 2021. However, the company indicated in December 2020 they had put the plans on hold due to the COVID-19 pandemic.

The wheel arrived at the Music Concourse in San Francisco's Golden Gate Park on March 15, 2020, and was completed on March 21 as an attraction to celebrate the park's 150th anniversary. While that celebration was cancelled due to the COVID-19 pandemic, the observation wheel opened on October 21, 2020, under a one-year contract. The contract was later extended an additional year to help the operator recoup their lost costs from the pandemic. It closed on October 22, 2023, to relocate to nearby Fisherman's Wharf in time for the 2023 Asia-Pacific Economic Cooperation summit.

Since November 13, 2023, it has been operating in San Francisco's Fisherman's Wharf.

=== Locations ===
Location	Dates	References
Fisherman's Wharf, San Francisco, California	November 13, 2023–present	
Music Concourse, San Francisco, California	October 21, 2020 – October 22, 2023	
The Banks, Cincinnati, Ohio	September 1, 2018 – March 1, 2020	
Waterside District, Norfolk, Virginia	May 19, 2018 – August 19, 2018	
Waterfront Park, Louisville, Kentucky	March 29, 2018 – May 6, 2018	

== Gallery ==
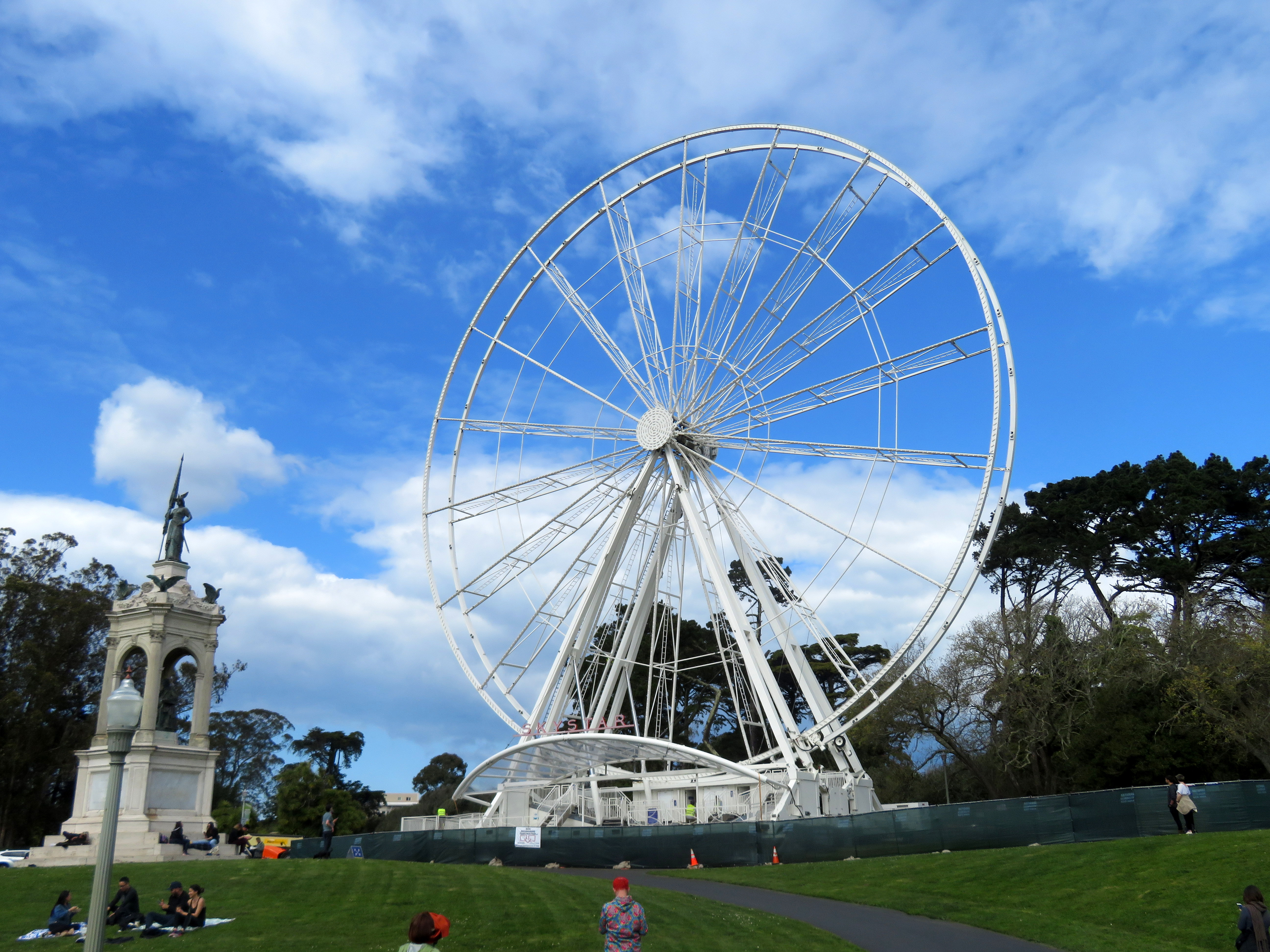

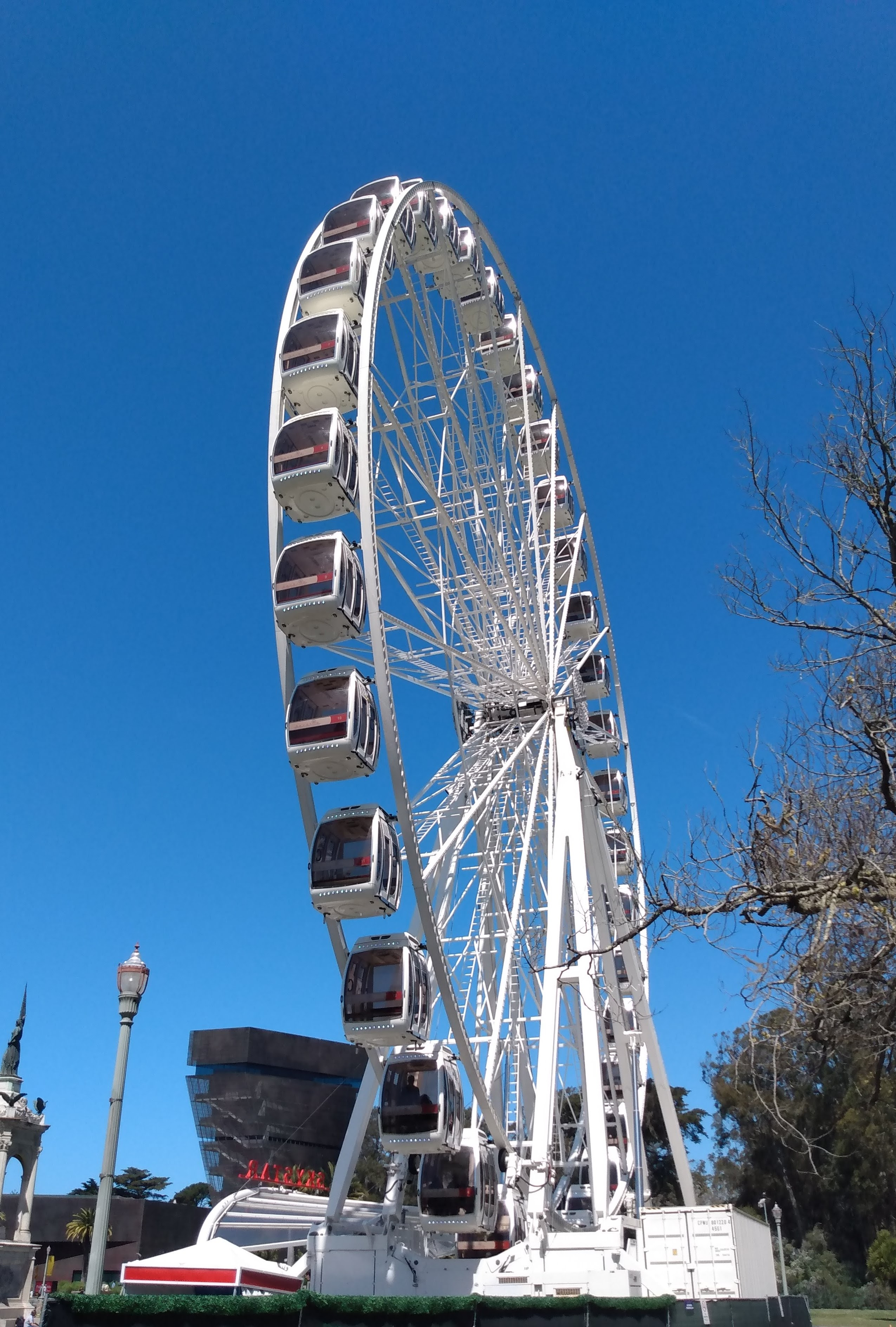

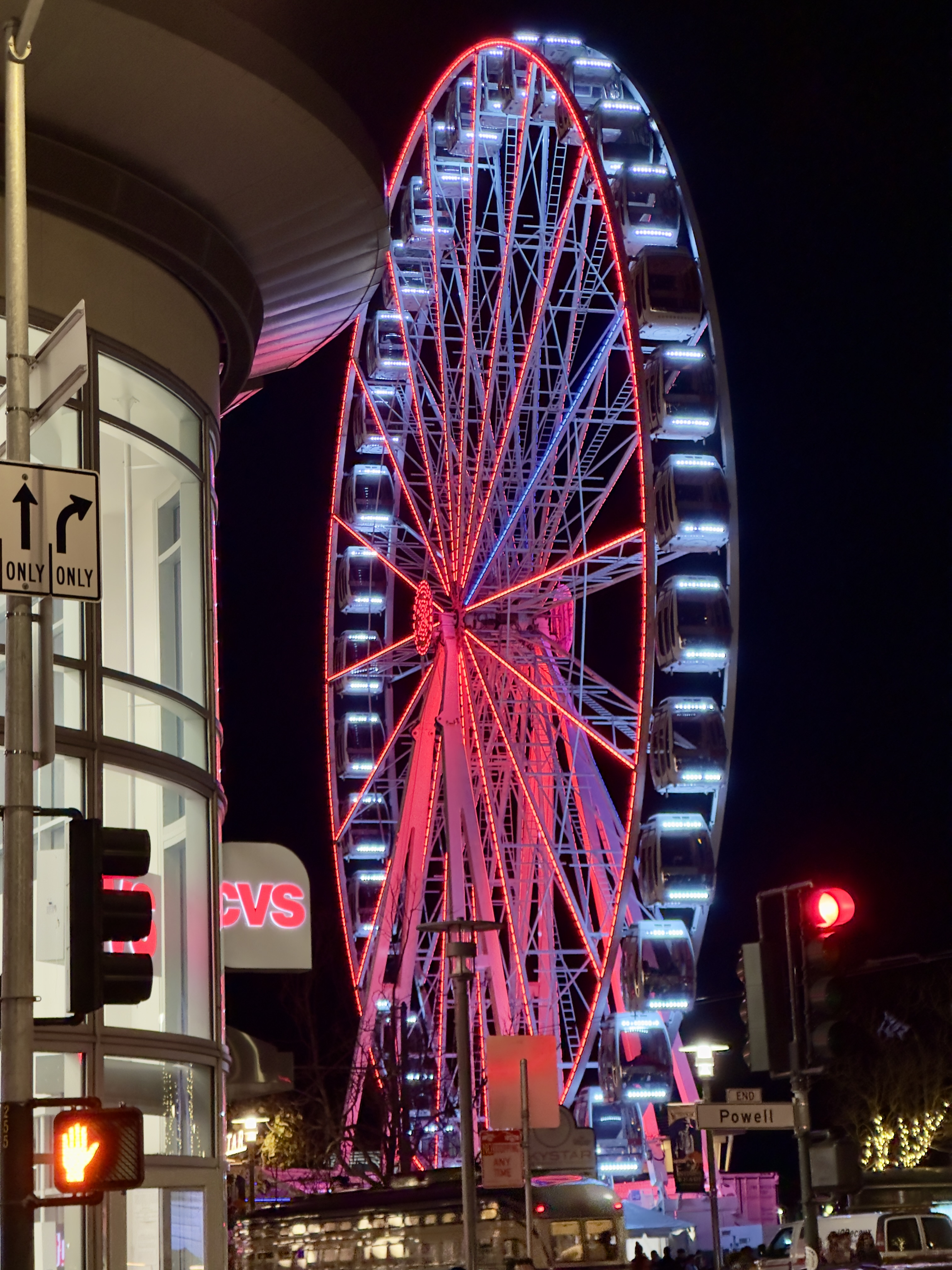

== See also ==
- List of Ferris wheels
