= Spreckels Temple of Music =

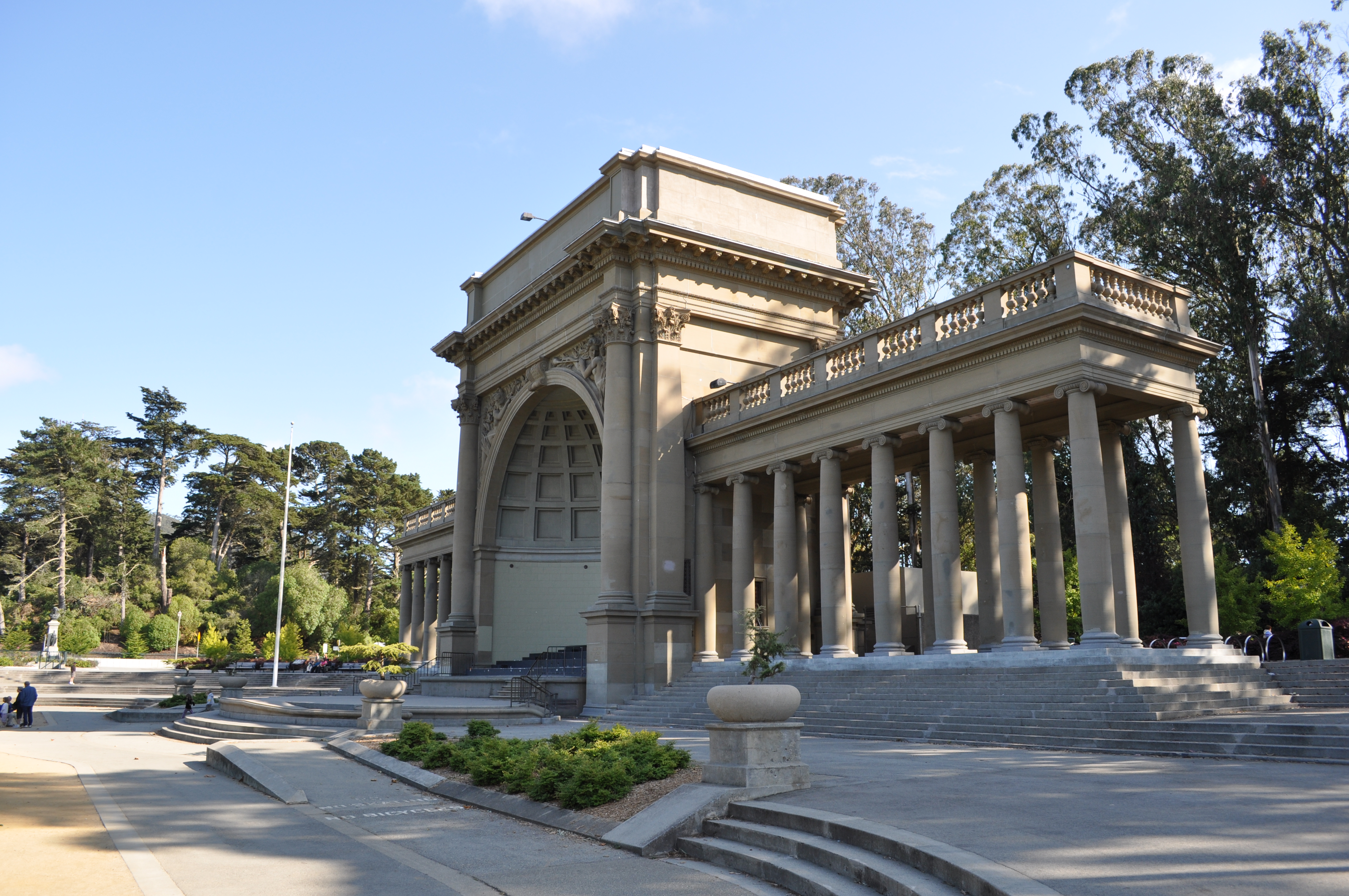
- Spreckels Temple of Music on the Music Concourse at Golden Gate Park.

- Spreckels Temple of Music is in San Francisco Spreckels Temple of Music (the United States)
- 37°46′11″N 122°28′6″W
- Location: Golden Gate Park in San Francisco

History
- Built: 1900

Site notes
- Height: 80 feet (24 m)
- Area: 2.17 acres (1 ha)
- Architect: Reid & Reid
- Sculptor: Robert Ingersoll Aitken
- Architectural style: Italian Renaissance
- Governing body: San Francisco Recreation & Parks Department

Spreckels Temple of Music, also called the bandshell, constructed in 1900, is in the Music Concourse at Golden Gate Park in San Francisco. It was a gift to the city from sugar magnate Claus Spreckels and is one of the largest bandshells in North America.

== History ==
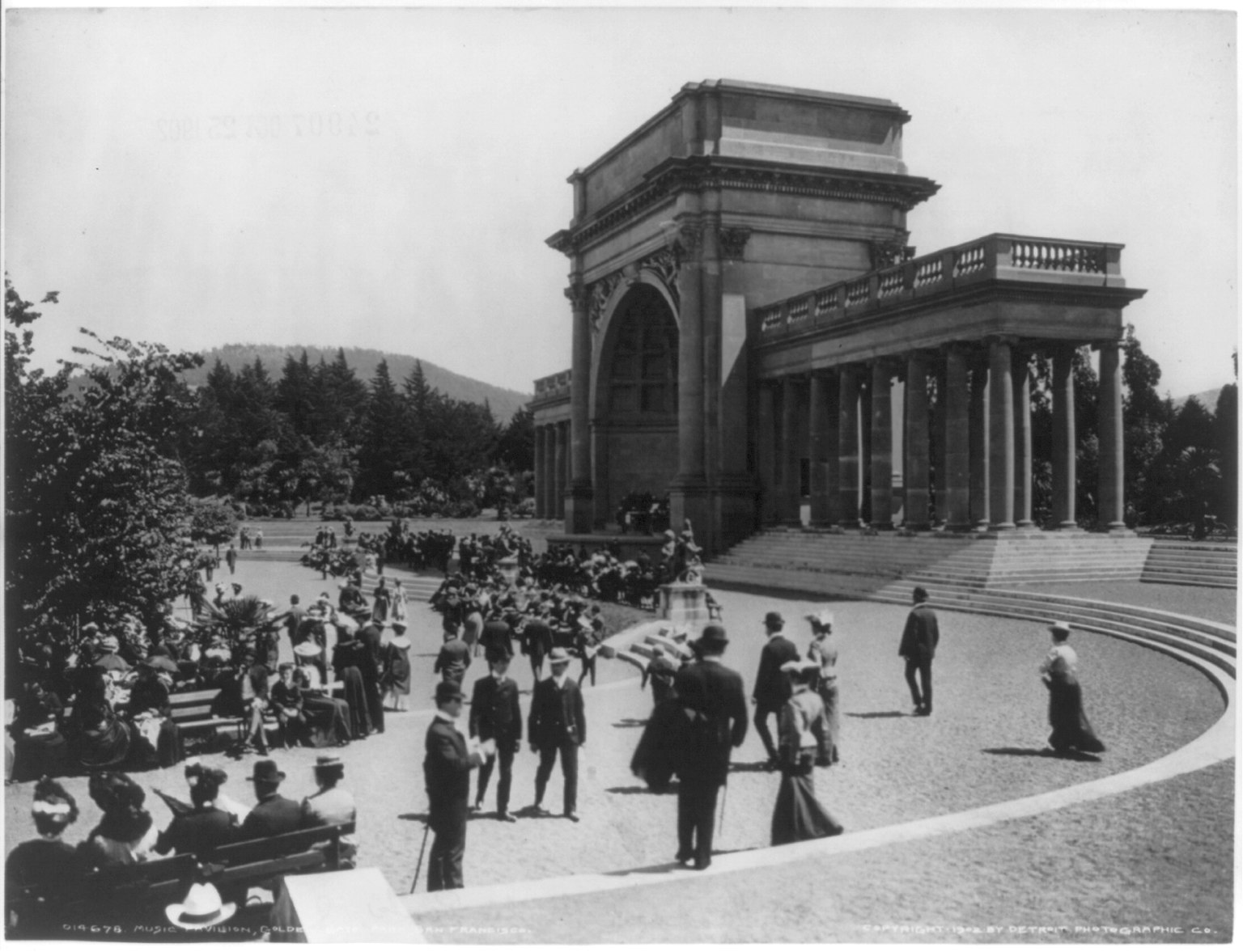
Spreckels Temple of Music, Golden Gate Park, San Francisco.

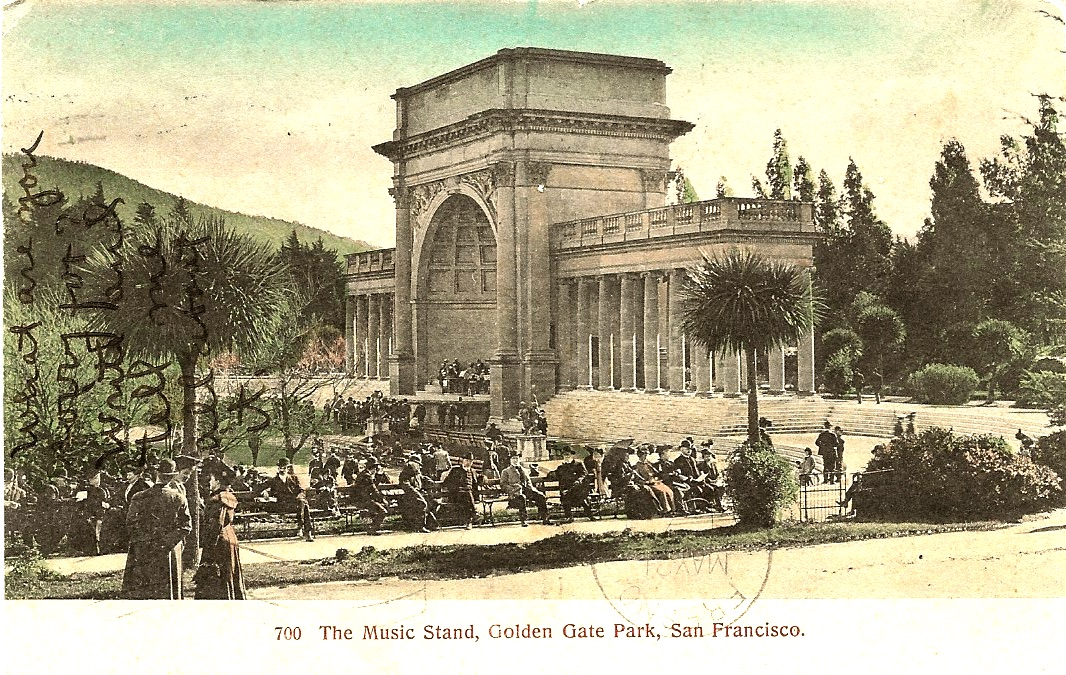
1908 Post Card of what was called the "Music Stand," Golden Gate Park, San Francisco.

The Spreckels Temple of Music was the third bandstand in the park. The first was built in 1882, and a larger one was built 1888. In 1895, discussions began about building a larger bandshell to accommodate the "Sunday and holiday crowds." Adolph B. Spreckels, president of the San Francisco Park Commission, convinced his father, sugar magnate Claus Spreckels, founder of the Spreckels Sugar Company, to pay for it. Spreckels spent $75,000 towards the $78,810 cost of the building.

The new bandstand was dedicated as a gift to the people of California on Admission Day, September 9, 1900, in celebration of the 50th anniversary of the state's admission to the Union. 75,000 people attended celebration in the Golden Gate Park. Spreckels and General W. H. L. Barnes stepped into the music stand to address the people. Spreckels gave a speech about his gratitude for the benefits he received as an immigrant and that he had chosen to build a bandstand because music was uplifting and should be '"rendered free to all."

To your hands, General Barnes, as a representative of the people of California, I commit the gift. My wish is that the pavilion, and the music which will flow forth from it may be incentives to artistic aspirations among all the people of California, and help them to find that happiness, which humanity is to attain in this golden land, in a more abundant degree than in any other under the whole heavens.

Construction began in 1899, before the completion of the Music Concourse in 1900. It was designed by architects Reid & Reid. The building shell is an Italian Renaissance style with an acoustically reflective coffered shell standing 70 feet high and covered in Colusa sandstone. The two relief sculptures are by sculptor Robert Ingersoll Aitken. The one on the left holds a lyre and the one on the right a trumpet. The platform is 45 feet wide and 80 feet high and can accommodate 100 musicians. It is one of the largest bandshells in the North America.

The pavilion was severely damaged in the 1906 San Francisco earthquake. Much of its Colusa sandstone, cornices, balustrades, and corners collapsed. Architect Reid estimated the damage and cost of restoring it at $15,000. After the Loma Prieta earthquake, FEMA and the Office of Emergency Services spent $3.1 million on seismic upgrades.

In December 2021, the San Francisco Arts nonprofit, Illuminate the Arts installed a temporary light exhibit "Lift Every Voice" on top of the Temple of Music. The 4-foot high bronze-coated letters were installed and illuminated atop the 120-year-old Temple (also known as the Golden Gate Bandshell). The light installation was approved by the San Francisco Arts Commission to be in place for two years. The exhibit receives its inspiration from the song "Lift Every Voice and Sing," known as the Black National Anthem written by civil rights activist James Weldon Johnson.

In 2023, the San Francisco Arts Commission gave permission to extend the exhibit 5 more years.

== Today ==
The bandshell often draws 10,000 to 20,000 listeners. The pavilion has been the place for annual celebrations of the anniversary of the Polish Constitution of May 3, 1791.

== Gallery ==
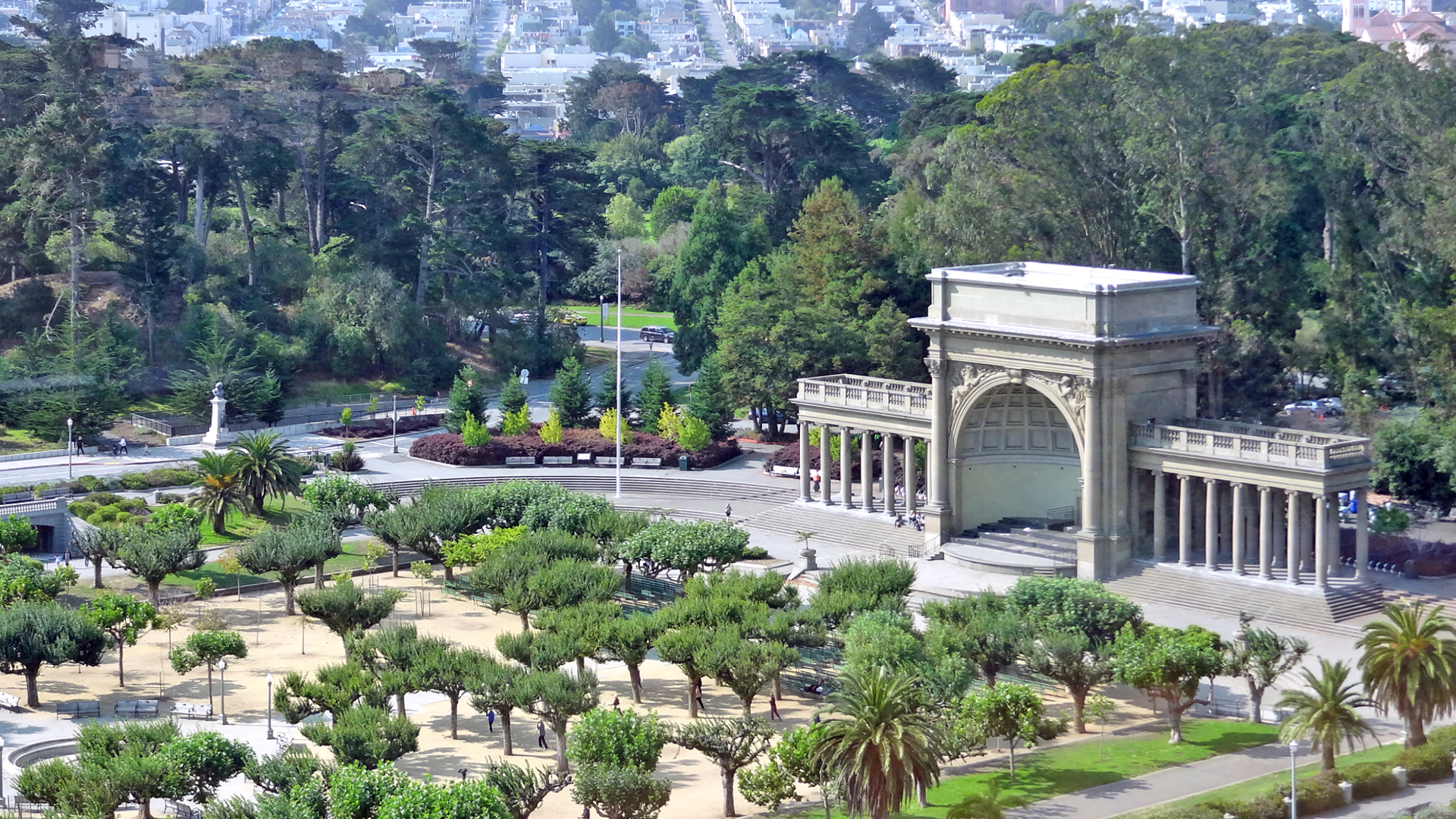
In front of the De Young Museum

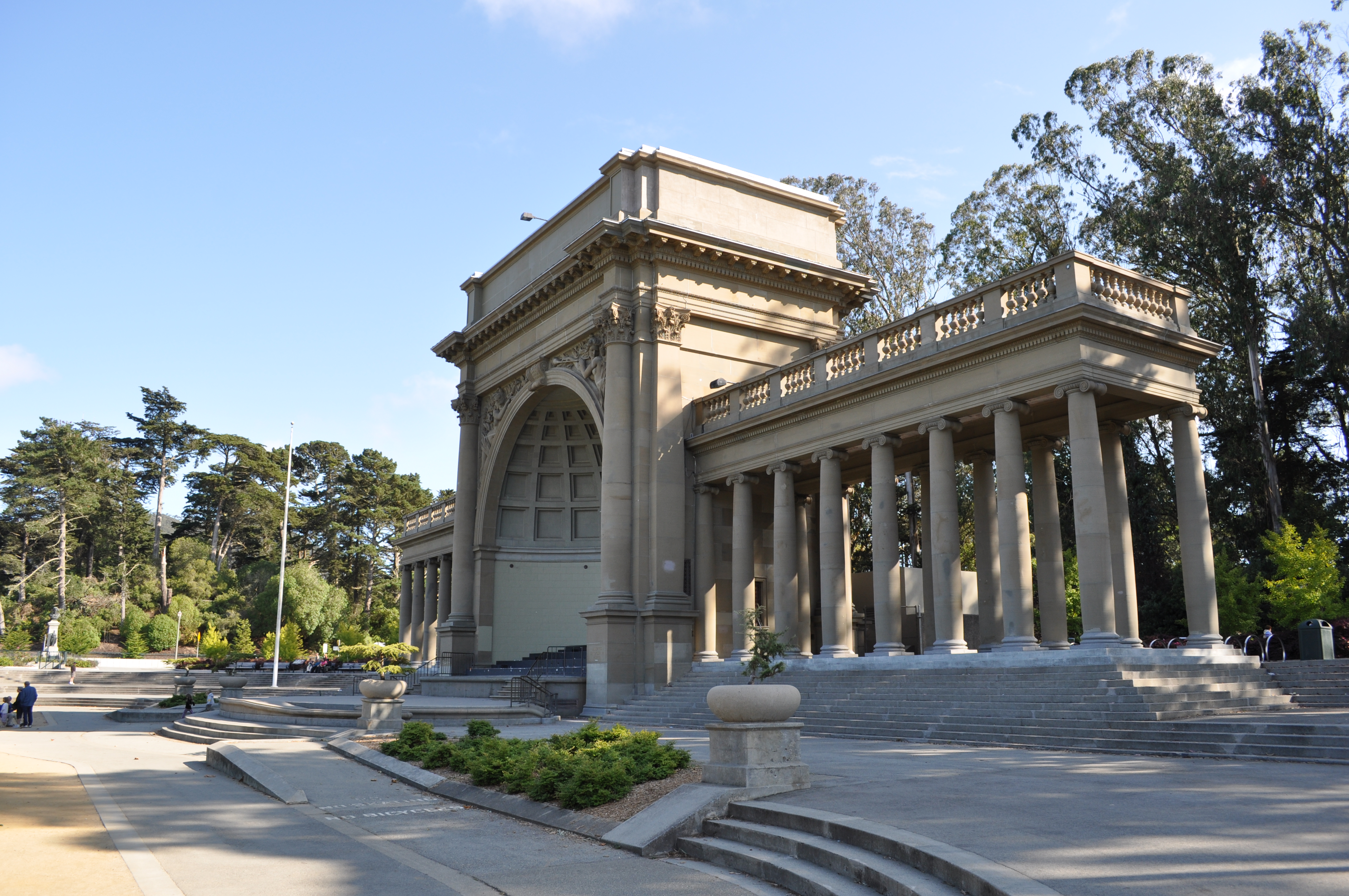
Golden Gate Park - Spreckels Temple of Music

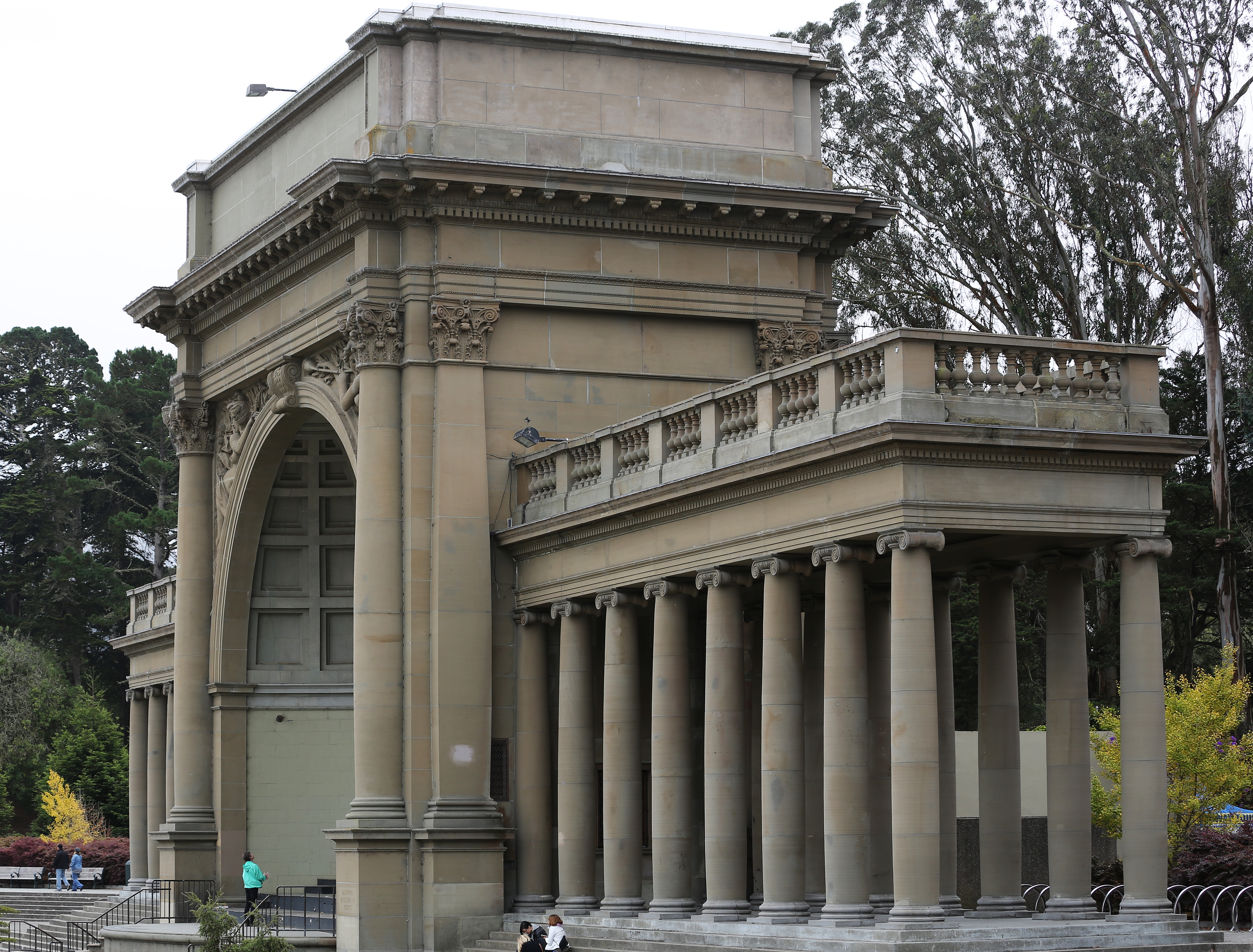
Music Concourse in Golden Gate Park

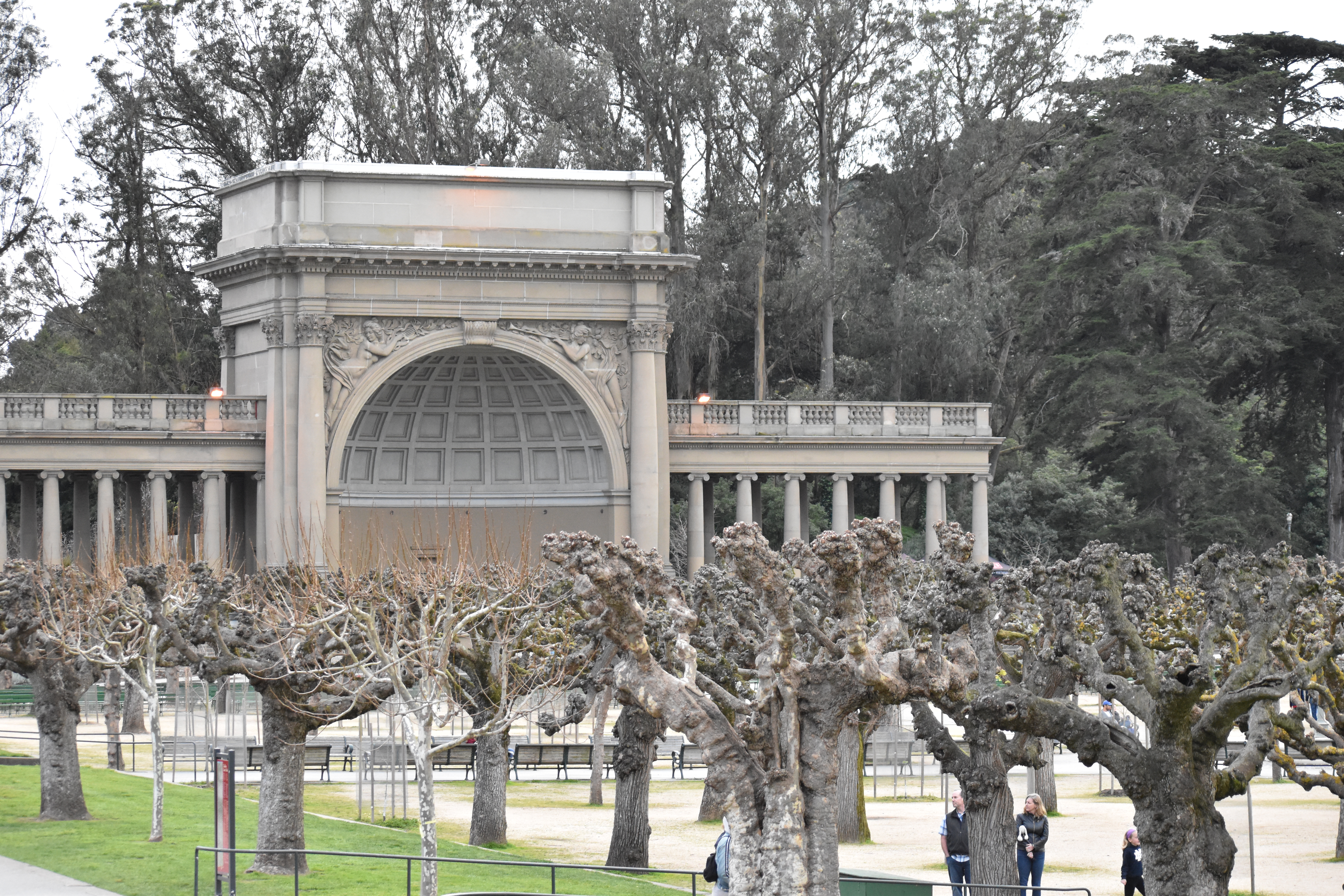
Spreckels Temple of Music

== See also ==
- Golden Gate Park
- Music Concourse
