= Forbes Island =

Floating island and former restaurant in California

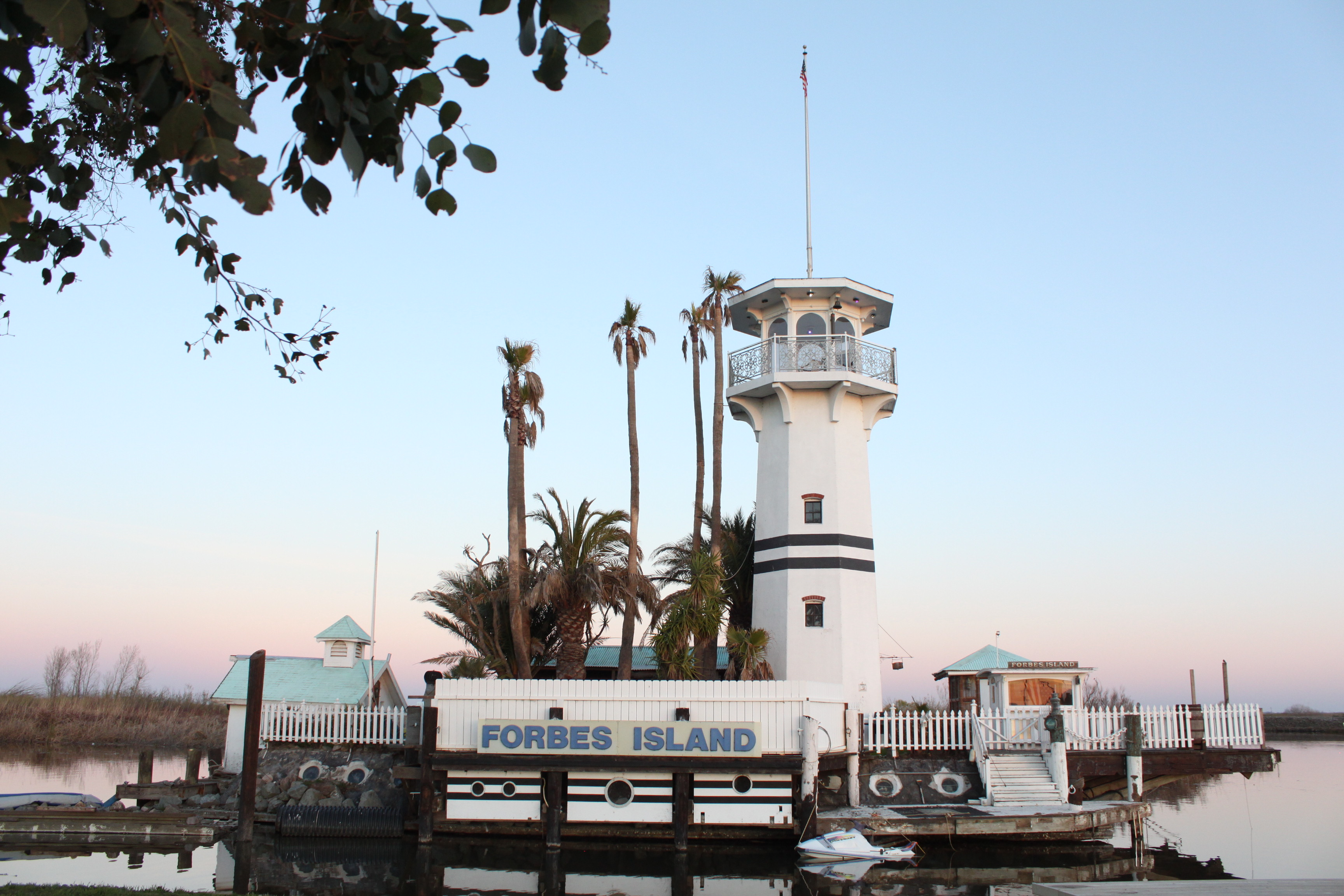
- Forbes Island in 2021, off of Holland Tract

- Location within Sacramento-San Joaquin River Delta Location within California Location within the United States

Geography
- Location: Northern California
- Coordinates: 38.0675°N 121.6488°W
- Adjacent to: Sacramento–San Joaquin River Delta

Administration
- United States
- State: California
- County: Contra Costa

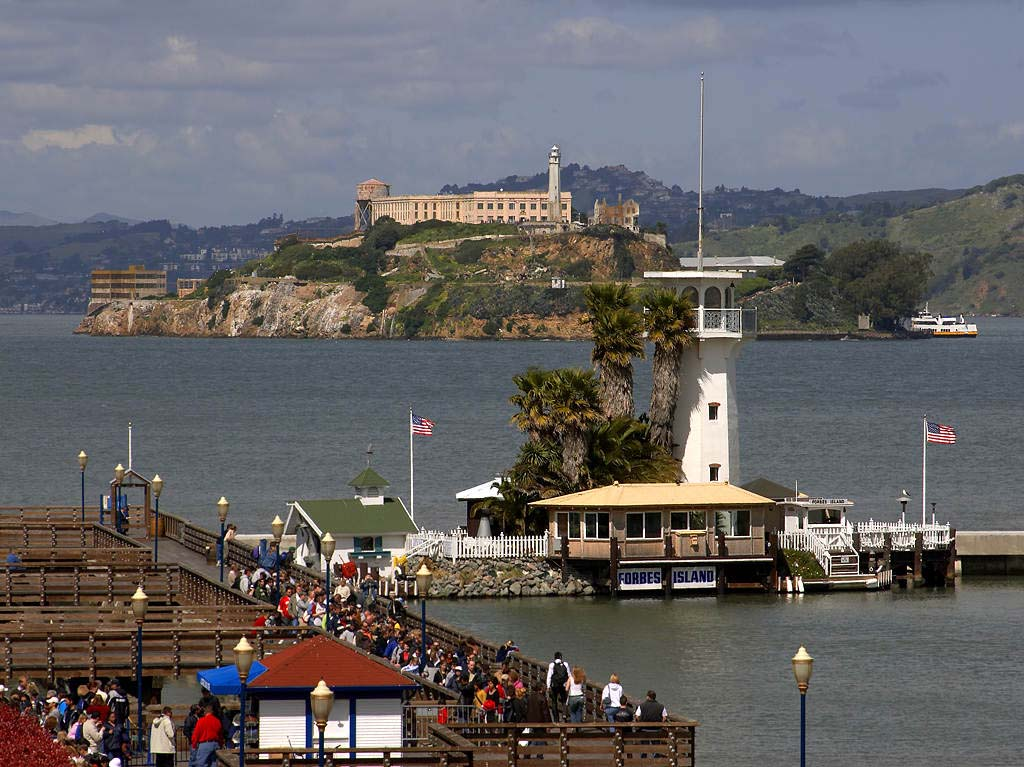
Forbes Island in San Francisco

Forbes Island is a floating island and event space near Bradford Island, California, United States. It was formerly a restaurant, located between Pier 39 and Pier 41 in Fisherman's Wharf, San Francisco. It was the only "floating island" restaurant in the Bay Area. The restaurant was inspired by Captain Nemo's marine dwelling. The restaurant closed in 2017, and the floating platform was moved to the Holland Riverside Marina in Brentwood, California.

In 2023, the floating island reopened as an event space; it is now permanently moored next to private land on Bradford Island, not far from Antioch, California.

== History ==
Forbes Island began as a houseboat residence on December 23, 1980, anchored offshore in Richardson Bay near Sausalito in Marin County, California. It was created by Forbes Thor Kiddoo, who invested $800,000 in the floating dwelling and built it between 1975 and 1980 using portholes from old vessels, seascape paintings, and a lathe to secure the wooden paneling and pillars. It had 15 rooms, three state rooms, a 600-square-foot salon with "fine woods, mirrors, brass, Persian rugs, a fireplace, chess table, grand piano and English pipe organ" and its own wine cellar. By the late 1980s, Sausalito residents started to complain that the dwelling was illegally moored. A 1987 article in Islands Magazine noted that Kiddoo had intended to sell the houseboat, but it was not until 1991 that the San Francisco Bay Conservation and Development Commission forced him out of Sausalito, due to building regulations.

After being evicted, Kiddoo applied to moor his barge in Half Moon Bay, but was rejected. He anchored it for five years in Antioch, California, and spent time remodelling it before he was given a 15-year renewable lease in San Francisco. The island dwelling was relocated and reopened as the Forbes Island restaurant between Pier 39 and Pier 41 in Fisherman's Wharf, San Francisco in 1999. The only "floating island" restaurant in the Bay Area, it measured 50 by 100 feet, weighed 700 tons, and had its own palm trees, waterfall, fake fireplace, 55-step lighthouse with Fresnel lens, and Tahitian dining room. The portalled dining room was underwater and decorated to resemble the interior of an early 19th-century sailing ship. The restaurant had its own wine cellar, which was once a venue for a Tony Bennett concert, as well as a boudoir for women. While in San Francisco, its coordinates were 37°48′38.1″N 122°24′44.8″W.

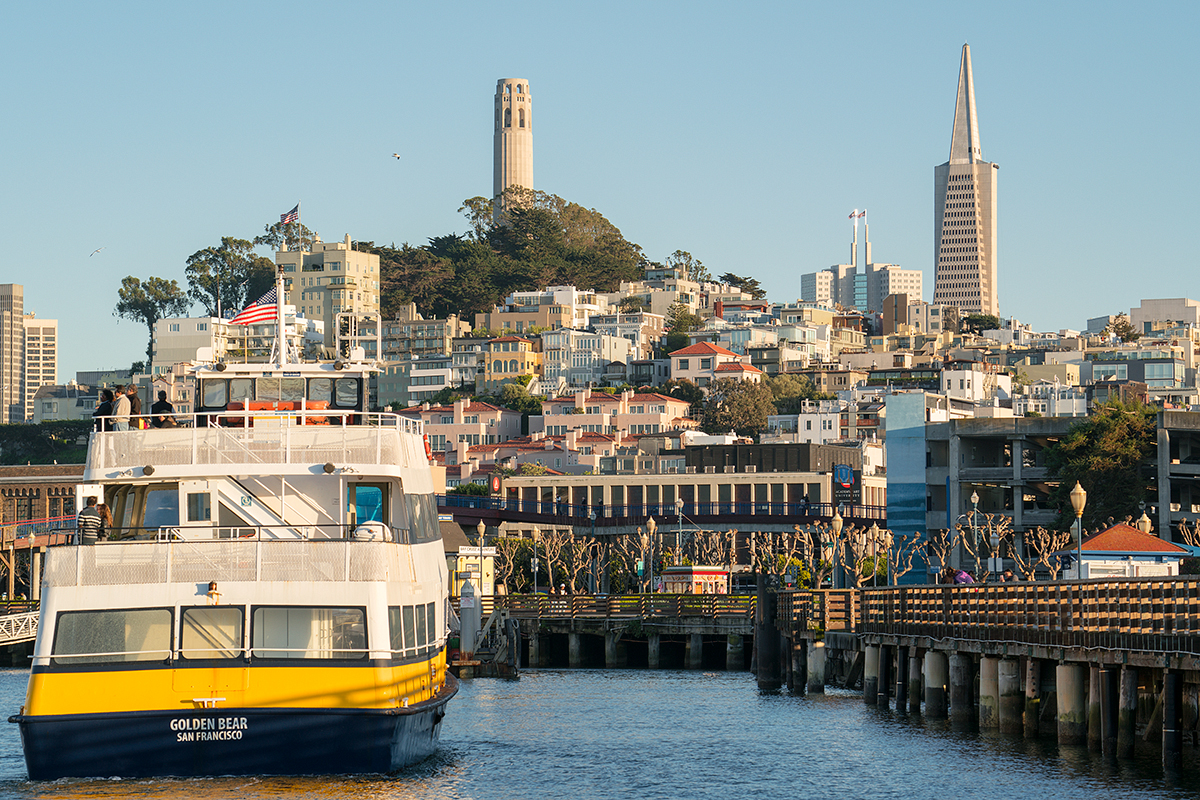
San Francisco from Forbes Island in March 2016

In 2016, the Island underwent renovation and repair work. On April 5, a San Francisco Fire Department fireboat towed the island to the BAE Systems San Francisco Ship Repair Yard at Pier 70 to commence a two-month restoration. It was later returned to its location near Pier 39 and was scheduled to reopen on June 15.

In August 2017, Forbes Island Restaurant closed down, with Forbes Kiddoo retiring. In March 2018, the restaurant was moored far from its previous location, at the Holland Riverside Marina in Brentwood, California, in the east of Contra Costa County, but was said to be for sale; it was reported to be unlikely to reopen as a restaurant.

After the Holland Riverside Marina changed ownership, Forbes Island was moved to its current location off Bradford Island where it reopened in 2023 as a rentable group camp and event space.

== Cuisine ==
A 2010 report stated that the restaurant served calamari salad, flatiron steak with mustard-cognac sauce, herb-baked lamb and other dishes. The San Francisco Chronicle wrote of the dining experience: "Warmed by a faux fire, diners feast on filet mignon, mushroom risotto and sea bass while chandeliers sway with the ocean surge beneath them. Fish swim by portholes and Satchmo plays on the sound system." The 2016 menu included steak, salmon, ribs, chicken and risotto.
