= Giuseppe Verdi Monument (San Francisco) =

Monument in San Francisco, California, U.S.

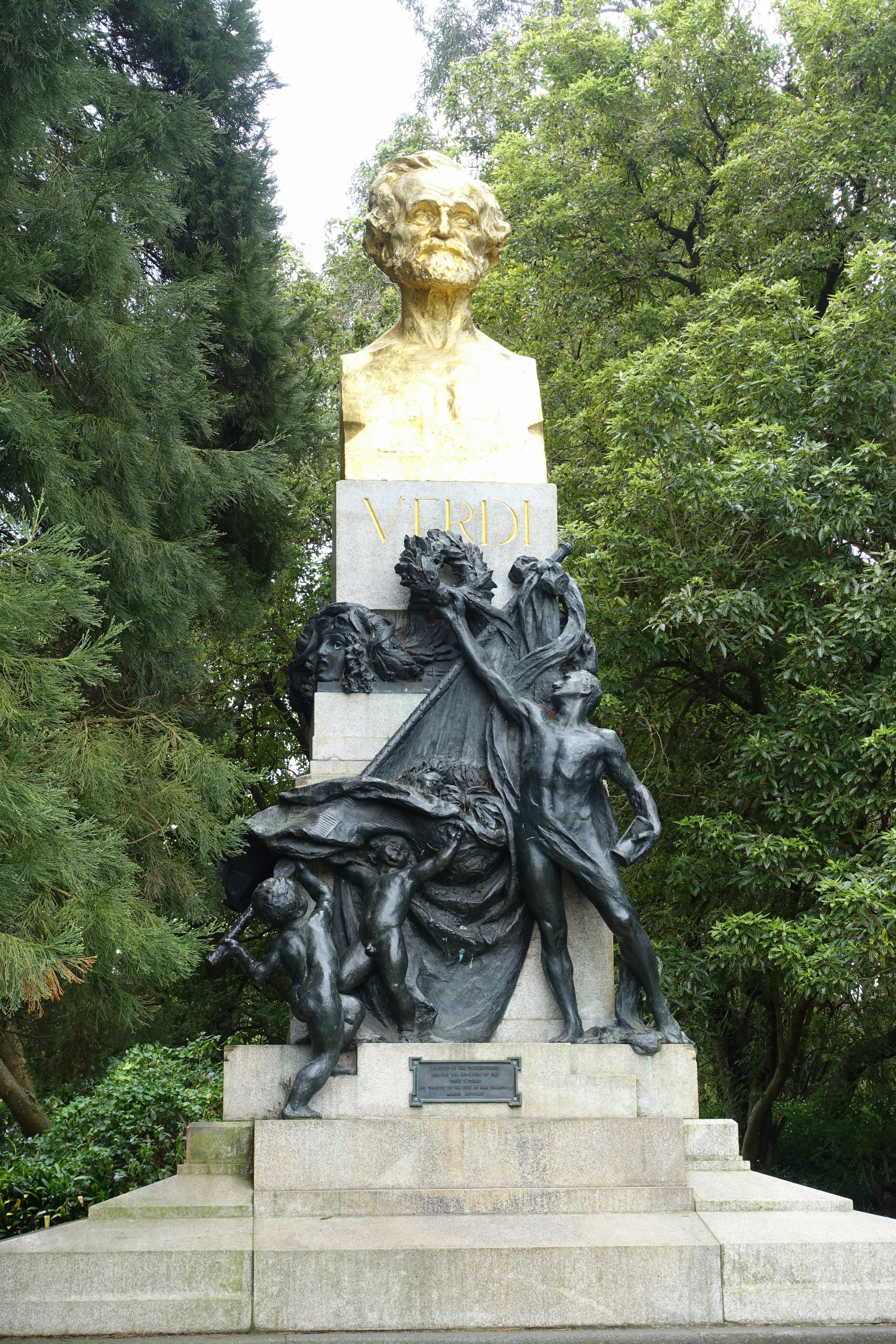
- The monument in 2015
- Artist: Orazio Grossoni
- Medium: Bronze
- Subject: Giuseppe Verdi
- Dimensions: 730 cm (288 in)
- Weight: 52 tons
- Location: San Francisco, California, U.S.; 37.76917°N 122.46835°W

The Giuseppe Verdi Monument is installed in San Francisco's Golden Gate Park, in the U.S. state of California. The monument was dedicated on March 23, 1914, to the soprano singer Luisa Tetrazzini. Ettore Patrizzi, an Italian newspaper owner, raised $15,000 for the monument through a subscription fund. The monument was made by Orazio Grossoni, an Italian sculptor from Milan.

== History ==
Planning for the monument began after Giuseppe's death on January 27, 1901.

In 1900, Ettore Patrizzi, the editor and owner of L'Italia, started a subscription fund that collected $15,000 for the monument's dedication.

The dedication for the monument took place on March 23, 1914. The monument was dedicated to soprano singer Luisa Tetrazzini, who performed at the dedication. Attendance was recorded at about 20,000.

In 2003, the statue was restored, with the bust of Verdi being regilded.

== Description ==
The statue stands at 24 feet and weighs 52 tons. tall and features a bust of Giuseppe Verdi at the top of the statue. Below the bust is a depiction of the four muses, Love, Tragedy, Joy, and Sorrow. At the back of the monument's base is a poem written by arch-nationalist poet Gabriele d'Annunzio.

=== Poem ===
Translated into English, the poem reads as follows:

He drew his chorus

From the deepest vortex of striving masses

He voiced the hopes and sorrows of all humanity,

He wept and loved for all.
