= Credit-ticket system =

The credit-ticket system was a form of emigration prevalent in the mid to late nineteenth century, in which brokers advanced the cost of the passage to workers and retained control over their services until they repaid their debt in full. It generally refers to the immigration of Chinese to California, but migrants to Hawaii, British Columbia, and Australia participated in a similar process. Controversy exists over whether or not the credit-ticket system was actually voluntary. The association of Chinese laborers with involuntary contract labor during a time in which it was illegal exacerbated the public's anti-Asian sentiments. However, because of the lack of documentation regarding the credit-ticket system, it is difficult to prove whether or not Chinese laborers were truly free agents.

== Origins ==
=== End of indentured servitude ===
Indentured servitude, once the dominant form of emigration to the United States, had largely disappeared by the start of the nineteenth century. Secondly, changes in the labour markets in Europe made it easier for immigrants to support themselves and less necessary for them to sign indentured servitude contracts. Lower transport costs also made it easier for them to finance their own voyages, and decreased the cost of importing slaves. Indentured servitude fell out of favor as a form of European emigration as economic conditions in both Europe and the U.S. changed, and slavery became the primary source of cheap and controllable labor.

Chinese migrants were motivated by the same economic conditions as early European indentured servants. The ratio of the cost of migration to the wealth of the migrants was high, so they had to find other methods of financing their passage. While this ratio dropped for European migrants in the nineteenth century, it remained high for Asian migrants. They also had incentives to emigrate because their projected earnings that in the U.S. were much higher than those in China, especially due to the promise of riches in the California Gold Rush, which began in 1848. Coinciding with the increased supply of labor from Asia was an increased demand for labor in the U.S. By the early 1800s, indentured servitude had largely disappeared, and the Act Prohibiting Importation of Slaves of 1807 ended the arrival of new slaves from Africa. In addition, the construction of the transcontinental railroad, which began in 1863, required a large but inexpensive labor force.

=== Differences from contract labor ===
Thus, while indentured servitude of Europeans decreased, they were replaced by new emigrants from Asia. Nineteenth-century Chinese emigration to the U.S. consisted of two forms: the credit-ticket system and the contract labor system. During the 1850s, when contract labor was still legal, labor brokers in California imported workers with contracts of fixed duration. In February 1862, however, the federal government passed legislation against contract labor, specifically indentured coolie labor from China. Legislation in California, the Anti-Coolie Act, followed in April of that same year. The Chinese Six Companies, the primary labor brokers in San Francisco, admitted to using contract labor, but claimed that they had stopped by 1853.

Consequently, Chinese emigrants arriving in California after 1862 under the credit-ticket system were not technically indentured, since they were not bound to their contract for a fixed number of years, but rather until they paid back their debt. Labor brokerage companies procured labor in China and advanced the cost of the voyage – about fifty dollars for the passage itself and twenty dollars for other expenses. Migrants repaid the debt in monthly installments, in addition to interest, after arriving in the U.S. Hence, in return for paying the initial seventy dollars, the brokers would receive about two hundred dollars from each emigrant. Unlike in indentured servitude, labor importers retained the costs of the debt themselves, and were not permitted to transfer labor contracts to employers.

== Enforcement ==
Since contract labor was illegal, labor brokers had to rely on extralegal means to enforce the migrants’ repayment of their debt. Steamship companies made agreements with labor brokers that they would prohibit migrants from returning to China unless they presented proof that they had repaid their debt in full. In addition, the foremen who were responsible for distributing wages would enforce debt contracts by withholding some of the workers’ pay. The withheld wages would then be used to pay back the brokers. In addition to these methods, historian Gunther Barth argues that labor import companies also utilized intimidation and violence against the migrants and their families back in China in order to enforce debt repayment.

Modern illegal human trafficking also frequently involves debt bondage, having the victim believe they must work to repay a debt for their travel, and that their families back at home are at risk.

== Controversy ==
There is considerable disagreement over the voluntary nature of the credit-ticket system. Although it differed from indentured servitude and contract labor, Barth and Sir W. Pember Reeves believe that it was still an involuntary form of emigration. Barth bases his argument on the assumption that coercion and physical violence were prevalent in the credit-ticket system. He calls the system a “thinly veiled slave trade.” However, David Galenson and Patricia Cloud present a different view in their analysis of Chinese immigration and contract labor in the late nineteenth century. They do not believe that there is enough evidence to back up Barth's claims. Pointing to the lack of substantive documentation, they conclude that the assertions of previous historians have been exaggerated. They believe that, while the Chinese were not completely free agents, given that they were bound to debt contracts, the credit-ticket system was still largely voluntary.
