= Detailed City Experience =

Feature of Apple Maps

- Release: September 27, 2021; 5 years ago
- Platform: iOS, iPadOS, macOS

Detailed City Experience (sometimes shortened to DCE) is a feature on Apple Maps which contains increased navigation and visual information and details across supported locations. Released in September 2021, the feature was initially only available in select major cities in the United States and United Kingdom. As of June 2026, Detailed City Experience is available in over half a dozen locations spanning 12 countries.

== Overview ==
Detailed City Experience is available in several select cities across the world. Cities with the feature contain detailed road markings to assist with user navigation, alongside bus routes, bike lanes and road closures, vegetation including trees and park areas, as well as custom-drawn visual depictions of major landmarks such as the Eiffel Tower or Statue of Liberty. As of October 2026, over 700 detailed landmarks are available worldwide. A nighttime mode is also available, which Apple has stated has a "moonlit glow".

== History ==
Detailed City Experience was first announced at the 2021 Worldwide Developers Conference. The feature was released on September 27, 2021, with the cities of San Francisco, London, Los Angeles and New York being the first to receive the feature. Two months later, in November, the feature was expanded to San Diego and Washington, D.C. In December, Detailed City Experience was released in Philadelphia.

In March 2022, Detailed City Experience was released in the Canadian cities of Toronto, Montreal and Vancouver, the first in the country. In August of that same year, the feature was added to Atlanta, Miami and Seattle, followed by Chicago and Las Vegas in September.

In January 2023, Detailed City Experience was released in Australia for the first time with the cities of Sydney and Melbourne being added. In February, Detailed City Experience was released in the German cities of Berlin, Munich and Hamburg. In March, the feature was released in Boston, as well as in Paris, France, in June. In July, the feature rolled out to Houston and Dallas in Texas. In October, Detailed City Experience was released in Madrid and Barcelona in Spain as well as Lisbon, Portugal.

In July 2024, Apple added colorful models to the Olympic sites in Paris and its surrounding areas, as well as other models in Paris. In December, Detailed City Experience was released in Amsterdam.

In January 2025, Detailed City Experience was released in New Orleans for Super Bowl LIX. In April, the feature was added to Stockholm in Sweden followed by Copenhagen in Denmark a few weeks later. In May, Detailed City Experience was released in Monaco, becoming the first microstate to receive the feature. In August, Detailed City Experience was released in Singapore, becoming the first Asian location to receive the feature. In November, Detailed City Experience was released in Kansas City.

In January 2026, Detailed City Experience was released in Milan for the 2026 Winter Olympics, becoming the first Italian city to receive the feature. In February, Apple released a detailed 3D model of the Albert Park Circuit, among other buildings in Melbourne, Australia, for the 2026 Formula One World Championship. In April, Apple released 3D models of the Miami Grand Prix and Nu Stadium. In May, Detailed City Experience was released in the cities of Rome and Naples. In June, Detailed City Experience was released in Detroit. On October 14, 2026, Apple expanded the Detailed City Experience to Austin, Texas, ahead of the United States Grand Prix. On November 5, 2026, Detailed City Experience was expanded to Phoenix, Arizona.

== Timeline ==
Date	Locations
September 27, 2021	(United States) Los Angeles, New York City, San Francisco (United Kingdom) London
November 11, 2021	(United States) San Diego, Washington D.C.
December 16, 2021	(United States) Philadelphia
March 24, 2022	(Canada) Montreal, Toronto, Vancouver
August 5, 2022	(United States) Atlanta, Chicago, Miami, Seattle
September 12, 2022	(United States) Las Vegas
January 20, 2023	(Australia) Melbourne, Sydney
February 17, 2023	(Germany) Berlin, Hamburg, Munich
March 16, 2023	(United States) Boston
June 5, 2023	(France) Paris
July 27, 2023	(United States) Dallas, Houston
October 5, 2023	(Portugal) Lisbon (Spain) Barcelona, Madrid
October 25, 2024	(Netherlands) Amsterdam
January 30, 2025	(United States) New Orleans
April 21, 2025	(Denmark) Copenhagen (Sweden) Stockholm
May 14, 2025	Monaco
August 7, 2025	Singapore
November 13, 2025	(United States) Kansas City
January 22, 2026	(Italy) Milan
May 7, 2026	(Italy) Naples, Rome
June 8, 2026	(United States) Detroit
October 14, 2026	(United States) Austin
November 5, 2026	(United States) Phoenix

== Coverage ==
As of November 2026, Detailed City Experience is available in 40 cities in over a dozen countries in North America, Europe, Australia and Asia.

Cities with Detailed City Experience
Country	Locations
Australia	Melbourne, Sydney
Canada	Montreal, Toronto, Vancouver
Denmark	Copenhagen
France	Paris
Germany	Berlin, Hamburg, Munich
Italy	Milan, Naples, Rome
Monaco	Monaco
Netherlands	Amsterdam
Portugal	Lisbon
Singapore	Singapore
Spain	Barcelona, Madrid
Sweden	Stockholm
United Kingdom	London
United States	Atlanta, Austin, Boston, Chicago, Dallas, Detroit, Houston, Kansas City, Las Vegas, Los Angeles, Miami, New Orleans, New York City, Philadelphia, Phoenix, San Diego, San Francisco, Seattle, Washington, D.C.

== List of landmarks ==
As of October 2026, there are a total of 729 3D, colorized sites and landmarks on Apple Maps. Most of them include colorized and stylized labels, however, there are exceptions:

- landmarks that are 3D and colorized but do not included stylized labels.^{[*]}
- landmarks with stylized labels but are not 3D and colorized or have the Apple Indoor Maps feature instead.^{[**]}
- Multiple adjacent landmarks are unlabelled, or if a landmark is part of a site that has a label but it refers to a specific building (e.g. the World Trade Center in New York City), they will be considered separate sites. These exceptions will have a unique footnote.

Only sites with full 3D—colorized stylization are included in the count, regardless of label. Landmarks that contain multiple distinct properties but are labeled collectively on Apple Maps (e.g. Greektown Historic District in Detroit, Michigan) will be considered one site, and landmarks that are part of the same property but have distinct labels will be considered two sites (e.g. Hard Rock Stadium and the Formula 1 Pit Building in Miami Gardens, Florida).

Landmarks with Detailed City Experience
City	Number of DCE landmarks	DCE landmarks	Citations
Los Angeles	41	Ahmanson Theatre / Mark Taper Forum^{[MC]}, Apple Tower Theatre^{[*]}, BMO Stadium, Capitol Records, Cathedral of Our Lady of the Angels, Crypto.com Arena, Dignity Health Sports Park, Dodger Stadium, Getty Center, Getty Villa, Griffith Observatory, Hollywood Bowl, Hollywood Sign, Intuit Dome, Kia Forum, La Brea Tar Pits & Museum, Los Angeles City Hall, Los Angeles Convention Center, Los Angeles County Museum of Art, Los Angeles International Airport (LAX)^{[*]}, Los Angeles Memorial Coliseum, Music Center, Olvera Street, Pacific Design Center, Pink's Hot Dogs^{[*]}, RMS Queen Mary, Randy’s Donuts^{[*]}, Redondo Beach Station^{[*]}, Riviera Country Club^{[*]}, Rose Bowl Stadium, Santa Monica Pier, SoFi Stadium, TCL Chinese Theatres, The Dome^{[*]}, The Wiltern^{[*]}, U.S. Bank Tower^{[*]}, Union Station^{[*]}, Walt Disney Concert Hall, Watts Towers, Westin, Wilshire Grand Center^{[*]}	
New York City	43	4 World Trade Center^{[WTC]}, 7 World Trade Center^{[WTC]}, 9/11 Memorial & Museum^{[WTC]}, American Museum of Natural History, Apollo Theater, Apple Fifth Avenue^{[*]}, Apple SoHo^{[*]}, Barclays Center, Brooklyn Bridge, Chrysler Building, Citi Field, Ed Koch Queensboro Bridge^{[*]}, Ellis Island National Museum of Immigration, Empire State Building, Flatiron Building, George Washington Bridge^{[*]}, Grand Central Terminal, Lincoln Center, Little Island, Madison Square Garden, Manhattan Bridge^{[*]}, MetLife Building^{[ML]}, MetLife Stadium, Metropolitan Museum of Art, New York City Hall, New York Public Library, New York State Pavilion^{[*]}, One World Trade Center, Radio City Music Hall, Rockefeller Center, Solomon R. Guggenheim Foundation, Sports Illustrated Stadium, Statue of Liberty, Stonewall Inn, St. Patrick's Cathedral, Times Square, United Nations, Verrazzano–Narrows Bridge^{[*]}, Washington Square Arch, Whitney Museum of American Art, Williamsburg Bridge, World Trade Center Oculus^{[WTC]}, Yankee Stadium Bronx Zoo^{[**]}	
San Francisco (Bay Area)	69	Alcatraz Island, Apple Campus, Apple Fitness Center^{[AP]}, Apple Park, Apple Park Visitor Center^{[AP]}, Apple Union Square^{[*]}, Ashby^{[*]}, California Academy of Sciences, Castro Theatre, Cathedral of Christ the Light^{[*]}, Cathedral of St. Mary of the Assumption, Chase Center^{[*]}, Cliff House^{[*]}, Coit Tower, Conservatory of Flowers, Contemporary Jewish Museum^{[*]}, Emeryville^{[*]}, Ferry Building, Fox Theater Oakland, Glendenning Barn^{[AP]}, Golden Gate Bridge, Golden Gate Park Windmills, Grace Cathedral, Japanese Tea Garden, Levi's Stadium^{[LS]}, Millbrae^{[*]}, Mirage, Mission Dolores Basilica, Moscone Center^{[YB]}, Murphy Windmill^{[GGP]}, Oakland Arena, Oakland-Alameda County Coliseum, Oakland–Jack London, Old Chinese Telephone Exchange^{[*]}, Old Saint Mary's Cathedral + Chinese Mission, Oracle Park, Painted Ladies, Palace of Fine Arts, Parking Structure North^{[AP]}, Parking Structure South^{[AP]}, PayPal Park, Peace Pagoda, Pier 39, Pixar, Richmond–San Rafael Bridge, Salesforce Park, Salesforce Tower, San Francisco City Hall, San Francisco International Airport (SFO)^{[*]}, San Francisco Museum of Modern Art, San Francisco–Oakland Bay Bridge, San Jose Diridon^{[*]}, San Pedro Square Market, SAP Center, Sather Tower^{[*]}, Spreckels Temple of Music^{[*]}, Steve Jobs Theater^{[AP]}, Sutro Tower, Tantau 14^{[AP]}, Tantau Reception Center^{[AP]}, The Crossing at East Cut^{[*]}, The Observatory^{[AP]}, The Tech Interactive, Transamerica Tower, Wave Organ^{[*]}, West Portal^{[*]}, Wolfe Reception Center^{[AP]}, Yerba Buena Center for the Arts Dragon Gate^{[**]}, Fisherman's Wharf^{[**]}, Lombard Street^{[**]}, Mavericks^{[**]}, Sutro Baths^{[**]}, Twin Peaks^{[**]}	
London	52	110 The Queen's Walk, Abbey Road, Adelphi Theatre^{[*]}, Albert Memorial^{[*]}, Aldwych Theatre^{[*]}, Apple Covent Garden^{[*]}, Apple Regent Street^{[*]}, Battersea Power Station, British Museum, BT Tower, Buckingham Palace, Elizabeth Tower, Emirates Stadium, Eventim Apollo, Houses of Parliament, Kensington Palace, King's Cross^{[*]}, London Eye, Marble Arch, Millennium Bridge, Monument to the Great Fire of London, Nelson's Column, No. 1 Court^{[WB]}, No. 2 Court^{[WB]}, No. 3 Court^{[WB]}, O2 Academy Brixton^{[*]}, O2 Forum Kentish Town, One Canada Square, Piccadilly Circus, Queen Victoria Memorial, Royal Albert Hall, Royal Ballet and Opera, Royal Observatory Greenwich, Saint Pancras International^{[*]}, Shakespeare's Globe, St Paul's Cathedral, Stamford Bridge, Tate Modern, The Gherkin, The O2, The Shard, Theatre Royal Drury Lane, Tottenham Hotspur Stadium, Tower Bridge, Tower of London, Trafalgar Square, Wellington Arch, Wembley Stadium, Westminster Abbey, Westminster Cathedral, Wimbledon Centre Court, Wyndham's Theatre	
San Diego	11	Botanical Building, Gaslamp Quarter, Maritime Museum of San Diego, Mission Basilica San Diego de Alcalá, Mt. Soledad National Veterans Memorial, Museum of Us, Old Point Loma Lighthouse, Petco Park, San Diego Air & Space Museum, San Diego–Coronado Bridge, USS Midway Museum	
Washington, D.C.	36	American Veterans Disabled for Life Memorial^{[*]}, Apple Carnegie Library^{[*]}, Audi Field, Capital One Arena, District of Columbia War Memorial, Founders Library, Frederick Douglass National Historic Site, Kennedy Center, Korean War Veterans Memorial, Library of Congress, Lincoln Memorial, Martin Luther King, Jr. Memorial, National Air and Space Museum, National Archives Museum, National Gallery of Art, National Gallery of Art - East Building^{[NG]}, National Museum of African American History and Culture, National Museum of American History, National Museum of Natural History, National Museum of the American Indian, National Portrait Gallery, Nationals Park, Smithsonian Institution Building, Supreme Court of the United States, The Pentagon, Thomas Jefferson Memorial, Tomb of the Unknown Soldier, United States Capitol, United States Holocaust Memorial Museum, Vietnam Veterans Memorial, Washington Monument, Washington National Cathedral, Washington Union Station, Watergate Complex, White House, World War II Memorial Arlington National Cemetery^{[**]}, Decatur House^{[**]}, Ford's Theatre^{[**]}	
Philadelphia	16	Boathouse Row, Citizens Bank Park, Elfreth's Alley Museum, Fisher Fine Arts Library, Frankford Avenue Bridge, Franklin Institute, Geno's Steaks, Independence Hall, John F. Kennedy Plaza / LOVE Park, Liberty Bell Center, Lincoln Financial Field, One Liberty Place, Pat's King of Steaks, Philadelphia City Hall, Philadelphia Museum of Art, Xfinity Mobile Arena Reading Terminal Market^{[**]}, South 9th Street Italian Market^{[**]}	
Montreal	19	Apple Sainte-Catherine^{[*]}, Basilique Notre-Dame de Montréal, Biodome de Montreal, Biosphère, Casino Montreal, Centre Bell, Cinéma du Musée^{[CM]}, Congregation Shaar Hashomayim, Gibeau Orange Julep, Grande roue de Montréal, Habitat 67, L'Oratoire Saint-Joseph du Mont-Royal, Montreal Clock Tower, Montreal Museum of Fine Arts, Mount Royal Chalet, Percival Molson Memorial Stadium, Place des Arts, Stade Olympique, Stade Saputo	
Toronto	15	50 Absolute World, Aga Khan Museum, Art Gallery of Ontario, BMO Field, Casa Loma, City Centre Transit Terminal, City Hall, CN Tower, Exhibition Place, Hockey Hall of Fame, Massey Hall, Rogers Centre, Royal Ontario Museum, Scotiabank Arena, Toronto Sign^{[TS]}	
Vancouver	13	BC Place, Canada Place, Capilano Suspension Bridge, Dr. Sun Yat-Sen Classical Chinese Garden, Gastown Steam Clock, Inukshuk^{[*]}, Richmond Olympic Oval, Rogers Arena, Science World, Totem Poles in Stanley Park, Vancouver Convention Centre, Vancouver House, Vancouver Lookout	
Atlanta	4	Ebenezer Baptist Church, Mercedes-Benz Stadium, Truist Park, World of Coca-Cola	
Chicago	11	875 North Michigan Avenue, Apple Michigan Avenue^{[*]}, Art Institute of Chicago, DuSable Black History Museum and Education Center, Field Museum, Frederick C. Robie House, Millennium Park, Rate Field, Soldier Field, Willis Tower, Wrigley Field Valois^{[**]}	
Miami	17	Candy-Colored Lifegaurd Towers^{[*]}, Chase Stadium, Fontainebleau Miami Beach, Forumula 1 Pit Building, Freedom Tower, Hard Rock Stadium, Joe's Stone Crab, Kaseya Center, La Carreta, Little Haiti Cultural Complex, LoanDepot Park, Miami Beach Convention Center, Miami Tower, Nu Stadium, The Fillmore Miami Beach at the Jackie Gleason Theater, Versailles, Vizcaya Museum & Gardens	
Seattle	4	Lumen Field, Pike Place Market, Space Needle, T-Mobile Park	
Las Vegas	24	Allegiant Stadium, Bellagio, Caesars Palace, Circus Circus, Excalibur Hotel & Casino, Flamingo Las Vegas, Fontainebleau Las Vegas, Formula 1 Pit Building, Hard Rock Hotel & Casino^{[*]}, High Roller Wheel, Little Church of the West, Luxor, Mandalay Bay, MGM Grand, New York-New York Hotel & Casino, Paris Las Vegas Hotel & Casino, Resorts World Las Vegas, Rio Hotel & Casino, A Destination by Hyatt Hotel, Sphere, Strat Hotel, Casino & Tower, T-Mobile Arena, Treasure Island Las Vegas, Welcome to Fabulous Las Vegas Sign, Wynn Las Vegas	
Melbourne	22	AAMI Park, Albert Park Grand Prix Circuit^{[*]}, Arts Centre Melbourne, Eureka Tower, Hamer Hall^{[*]}, John Cain Arena, Koorie Heritage Trust, Lakeside Stadium, Margaret Court Arena^{[MP]}, Marvel Stadium, Melbourne Cricket Ground, Melbourne Museum, Melbourne Sports and Aquatic Centre, National Gallery of Victoria^{[*]}, National Tennis Centre, Parliament of Victoria, Rod Laver Arena, Royal Exhibition Building, Show Court 2^{[MP]}, Shrine of Remembrance, St Patrick's Cathedral, St Paul's Cathedral	
Sydney	14	Accor Stadium, Allianz Stadium, Anzac Memorial, Art Gallery, Parliament House, Queen Victoria Building, St Mary's Cathedral, State Library of New South Wales, Sydney Opera House, Sydney Cricket Ground, Sydney Harbour Bridge, Sydney Observatory, Sydney Town Hall, Taronga Zoo Syndey Tower Eye^{[**]}	
Berlin	13	Berlin Cathedral, Berlin Central Station, Berliner Funkturm, Brandenburg Gate, Haus der Kulturen der Welt, Konzerthaus, Memorial to the Murdered Jews of Europe, Olympiastadion Berlin, Pergamon Museum, Reichstag Building, Schloss Charlottenburg, TV Tower, Victory Column Berlin Wall Memorial^{[**]}, Checkpoint Charlie^{[**]}	
Hamburg	3	Elbphilharmonie, Rathaus, St. Michaelis Church	
Munich	2	Allianz Arena, Munich Cathedral	
Boston	17	200 Clarendon Street, Boston City Hall, Boston Public Library, Bunker Hill Monument, Faneuil Hall Marketplace^{[FH]}, Fenway Park, Gillette Stadium, Isabella Stewart Gardner Museum, Massachusetts State House, Museum of Fine Arts, Old North Church, Paul Revere House, Ray and Maria Stata Center, South Station, TD Garden, Trinity Church Boston, Union Oyster House	
Paris	54	Accor Arena, Adidas Arena, Apple Champs-Élysées^{[*]}, Arc de Triomphe, Bassin du Dragon^{[PV]}, Bibliothèque nationale de France, Centre Georges-Pompidou, Dôme de Paris, Église Saint Sulpice, Eiffel Tower, Flame of Liberty Memorial, Foundation Louis Vuitton, Gare de l'Est, Gare du Nord, Grand Palais, Hôtel des Invalides, Hôtel de Ville, Institut du monde arabe, Latona’s Fountain & Parterre^{[PV]}, Le Golf National, Les Deux Magots, Louvre, Moulin Rouge, Musée d'Orsay, Notre-Dame Cathedral, Palace of Versailles, Palais de Chaillot^{[PC]}, Palais de l'Élysée, Palais Garnier, Panthéon, Parc des Princes, Paris Expo Porte de Versailles, Paris Olympic Aquatic Centre, Plenitude Arena, Place de la Bastille, Place de la Concorde, Place de la Madeleine, Place des Vosges, Place du Trocadéro, Place Vendôme, Pont Alexandre III, Pont d'Iéna, Pont de Bir-Hakeim, Pont des Arts, Pont Neuf, Rodin Museum, Roland-Garros, Sacré-Cœur Basilica, Sainte-Chapelle, Saint-Quentin-en-Yvelines Velodrome, Stade de France, Stade Jean Bouin, Stade Yves du Manoir, Vaires-sur-Marne Nautical Stadium Maxim's^{[**]}, Shakespeare and Company^{[**]}	
Dallas	9	African American Museum, American Airlines Center, AT&T Stadium, Dallas Museum of Art, Dealey Plaza Monument^{[DP]}, Globe Life Field, Perot Museum of Nature and Science, Reunion Tower, Sixth Floor Museum Pioneer Plaza Cattle Drive^{[**]}	
Houston	7	Daikin Park, Gerald D. Hines Waterwall Park, Reliant Stadium, Shell Energy Stadium, Space Center Houston, Toyota Center, Williams Tower James Turrell Twilight Epiphany Skyspace^{[**]}	
Lisbon	7	Belém Tower, Carmo Convent, Castel de São Jorge, Cathedral of Lisbon, Elevador de Santa Justa, Mosteiro dos Jerónimos, National Palace of Pena	
Barcelona	12	Basilica de La Sagrada Família, Casa Batlló, Cathedral of Barcelona, La Pedrera, Monumental Bullring of Barcelona, National Art Museum of Catalonia, Palau de la Música Catalana, Park Güell, Pez y Esfera^{[*]}, Temple of the Sacred Heart of Jesus, Torre de Collserola, Torres Venecianas	
Madrid	9	Almudena Cathedral, KIO Towers, Museo del Prado, Museo Nacional Centro de Arte Reina Sofía, Plaza Mayor, Puerta de Alcalá, Royal Palace of Madrid, Teatro Real, Temple of Debod	
Amsterdam	16	Amsterdam Centraal, Anne Frank House, Begijnhof, De Gooyer Windmill, Het Concertgebouw, Magere Brug, Nationaal Monument op de Dam, NEMO Science Museum, Rembrandt House Museum, Rijksmuseum, Royal Palace Amsterdam, Royal Theatre Tuschinski, Stedeijk Museum, Torensluis, Van Gogh Museum, Westerkerk	
New Orleans	12	Bourbon Street, Caesars Superdome, Café du Monde, Galatoire's, Labranche House, Lafitte's Blacksmith Shop, Musical Legends Park, Old Absinthe House, Preservation Hall, Royal Sonesta, St. Louis Cathedral, Steamboat NATCHEZ	
Copenhagen	21	Amalienborg, Byfraktal Af Elisabeth Toubro, Christiansborg Palace, Circle Bridge, Copenhagen City Hall, CopenHill, Den Hirschsprungske Samling, Elephant Gate, Frederik's Church, Glyptoteket, Grundtvig's Church, Home of Carlsberg, Kastellet, Palads, Palmehuset, Rosenborg Castle, Round Tower, Royal Opera, Skibene på Holmen, SMK, The Little Mermaid	
Stockholm	17	3Arena, Avicii Arena, Dramaten, Fotografiska, Kungliga Operan, Mariahissen, Nationalmuseum, Nobel Prize Museum, Nordiska Museet, Riddarholmen Church, Royal Palace, Stockholm Cathedral, Stockholm City Hall, Stockholms Stadion, Stomatol Sign, Sveriges Riksdag, Vasa Museum	
Monaco	10	Cathedral of Our Lady Immaculate, Fairmont Monte Carlo, Hôtel de Paris, La Rascasse, Monte Carlo Casino, Oceanographic Museum of Monaco, Port Hercules, Rainier III Nautical Stadium, Sainte-Dévote Chapel, Yacht Club de Monaco	
Singapore	25	Anderson Bridge, Apple Marina Bay Sands^{[*]}, ArtScience Museum, Bhudda Tooth Relic Temple, CHIJMES, Civilian War Memorial, Esplanade Bridge, Gardens by the Bay, Helix Bridge, Lau Pa Sat, Marina Bay Sands, Merlion, National Gallery Singapore, National Stadium, Raffles Hotel, Raffles Statue, Singapore Flyer, Sri Veeramakaliamman Temple, St Andrew's Cathedral, Sultan Mosque, Supreme Court of Singapore, Ten Square, The Fullerton Hotel, The Fullerton Waterboat House, Victoria Theatre and Concert Hall Esplanade^{[**]}	
Kansas City	17	Arrowhead Stadium, Arthur Bryant’s Barbeque, Community Bookself^{[CB]}, Country Club Plaza, CPKC Stadium, Joe’s Kansas City Bar-B-Que, Kauffman Center for the Performing Arts, Kauffman Stadium, KC Wheel, National WWI Museum and Memorial, Negro Leagues Baseball Museum, Nelson-Atkins Museum of Art, One Park Place, Starlight, Sporting Park, Union Station, Western Auto Sign	
Milan	3	Apple Piazza Liberty, Milan Cathedral, Sforza Castle Baro Basso^{[**]}, Galleria Vittorio Emanuele II^{[**]}	
Naples	3	Basilica of San Francesco di Paola, Castel dell'Ovo, Castel Nuovo The Ancient Pizzeria by Michele^{[**]}, Vesuvius^{[**]}	
Rome	8	Apple Via del Corso^{[*]}, Auditorium Parco della Musica Ennio Morricone, Borghese Gallery, Piazza del Popolo, Piazza Navona, Ponte Sant'Angelo, Spanish Steps, Trevi Fountain Buco della serrature dell'Ordine di Malta^{[**]}, Capitoline Hill^{[**]}, Jewish Ghetto^{[**]}	
Detroit	14	Ambassador Bridge, American Coney Island^{[*]}, Apple Downtown Detroit^{[*]}, Basilica of Ste. Anne de Detroit, Belle Isle Aquarium, Comerica Park, Detroit Institute of Arts, Ford Field, Ford Piquette Avenue Plant, Greektown Historic District, Little Caesars Arena, Henry Ford Museum of American Innovation, Michigan Central, Motown Museum	
Austin	20	Ann W. Richards Congress Avenue Bridge, Apple Domain NORTHSIDE^{[*]}, Apple Inc. - Austin Campus^{[*]}, Apple Inc. - Parmer Lane Campus^{[*]}, Blanton Museum of Art, COTA Observation Tower, COTALAND, Darrell K Royal-Texas Memorial Stadium, Formula 1 Pit Building, Franklin Barbecue, LBJ Presidential Library, Moody Center, Paramount Theatre, Q2 Stadium, Sixth Street, Terry Black's Barbecue, Texas State Capitol, The Driskill, The Oasis on Lake Travis, The Original Black’s BBQ	
Phoenix	18	Arizona State Capitol, ASU Gammage, Burton Barr Central Library, Chase Field, Desert Diamond Arena, Heard Museum, Luhrs Building, Luhrs Tower, Modern Manor, Mortgage Matchup Center, Ocotillo, Orpheum Theater, Pizzeria Bianco, Phoenix Art Museum, Phoenix City Hall^{[PH]}, Rustler’s Rooste, State Farm Stadium, Tovrea Castle at Carraro Heights	

^{AP}Apple Park and Mirage (an artpiece) is labelled, but the Apple Fitness Center, Apple Park Visitor Center, Glendenning Barn, Parking Structure North, Parking Structure South, Steve Jobs Theater, Tantau 14, Tantau Reception Center, The Observatory, and Wolfe Reception Center are not. Although they are all part of the Apple Park complex, they are far enough removed from each other to be considered their own sites. In addition, the Apple Park label refers to one building.

^{CB}Community Bookself refers to the exterior of the Library District Garage, which primarily serves the Central Library.

^{CM}Montreal Museum of Fine Arts is labelled, the Cinéma du Musée is not. Although they are part of the same institution, the label refers to one building, so they are considered separate sites.

^{DP}Sxith Floor Museum is labelled, but the adjacent Dealey Plaza Memorial is not. While closely related due to the assassination of John F. Kennedy, they are considered separate sites.

^{FH}Faneuil Hall Marktplace refers to both Fanueil Hall and the Quincy Market.

^{GGP}Golden Gate Park Windmills, referring specifically to the Dutch Windmill, is labelled, but the Murphy Windmill is not, so they are considered separate sites.

^{LS}Levi’s Stadium includes the noncontiguous parking garage across the street.

^{MC}The Music Center label refers specifically to the Dorothy Chandler Pavilion, but the Ahmanson Theatre / Mark Taper Forum building complex is not labelled. Although they are all part of the Los Angeles Music Center, the label refers to one building, so they are considered separate sites.

^{ML}Grand Central Terminal is labelled, but the MetLife Building, to which it is directly adjacent, is not. Because the label refers to one building, they are considered separate sites.

^{MP}AAMI Arena, John Cain Arena, Rod Laver Arena, and the National Tennis Centre are labelled, but the Margaret Court Arena and Show Court 2 are not. Although they are all part of Melbourne Park, the labels refers to individual stadiums, so they are considered separate sites.

^{NG}The West Building of the National Gallery of Art is labelled, but the East Building is not. Because the label refers to one building, they are considered separate sites.

^{PC}Place du Trocadéro is labelled, but the adjacent Palais de Chaillot is not. Because the label refers to a plaza and not the whole complex, they are considered separate sites.

^{PH}}Orpheum Theater is labelled, but the Phoenix City Hall, to which it is directly adjacent, is not. Because the label refers to one building, they are considered separate sites.

^{PV}Latona’s Fountain & Parterre and Bassin Du Dragon are in the Gardens of Versailles, but they are far enough removed from the palace building to be considered their own sites.

^{TS}The Toronto Sign is situated in the plaza in front of the Toronto City Hall, but it is far enough removed from the building to be considered its own site.

^{WB}The Wimbledon Centre Court refers specifically to Centre Court, but the No. 1 Court, No. 2 Court, and No. 3 Court are not labelled. Although they are all part of the one of many at the All England Club complex, the label refers to one building, so they are considered separate sites.

^{WTC}One World Trade Center is labelled, but 4 World Trade Center, 7 World Trade Center, the 9/11 Memorial & Museum, and the World Trade Center Oculus are not. Although they are all related to the World Trade Center complex, the label refers to one building, so they are considered separate sites.

^{YB}Moscone Center includes what may be considered parts of the Yerba Buena Center for the Arts, as they are adjacent, and other buildings on the block, such as the Children's Creativity Museum.

^{*}Landmarks that are 3D and colorized but do not included stylized labels.

^{**}Landmarks with stylized labels but are not 3D and colorized or have the Apple Indoor Maps feature instead. They are not included in the count.

== See also ==
- Flyover (Apple Maps)
- Look Around (Apple)
