= List of windmills in the United States =

This is a list of "traditional" windmills in the United States, which usually are gristmills.

In this nation more than others, "windmill" is often used to refer to what are properly termed windpumps bringing up water for agriculture. This is at least partly due to usage by windpump builders Eclipse Windmill Company (1873) and Aermotor Windmill Company (1888, the sole surviving US "windmill" manufacturer). And it is also used by many to refer to modern wind turbines generating electricity.

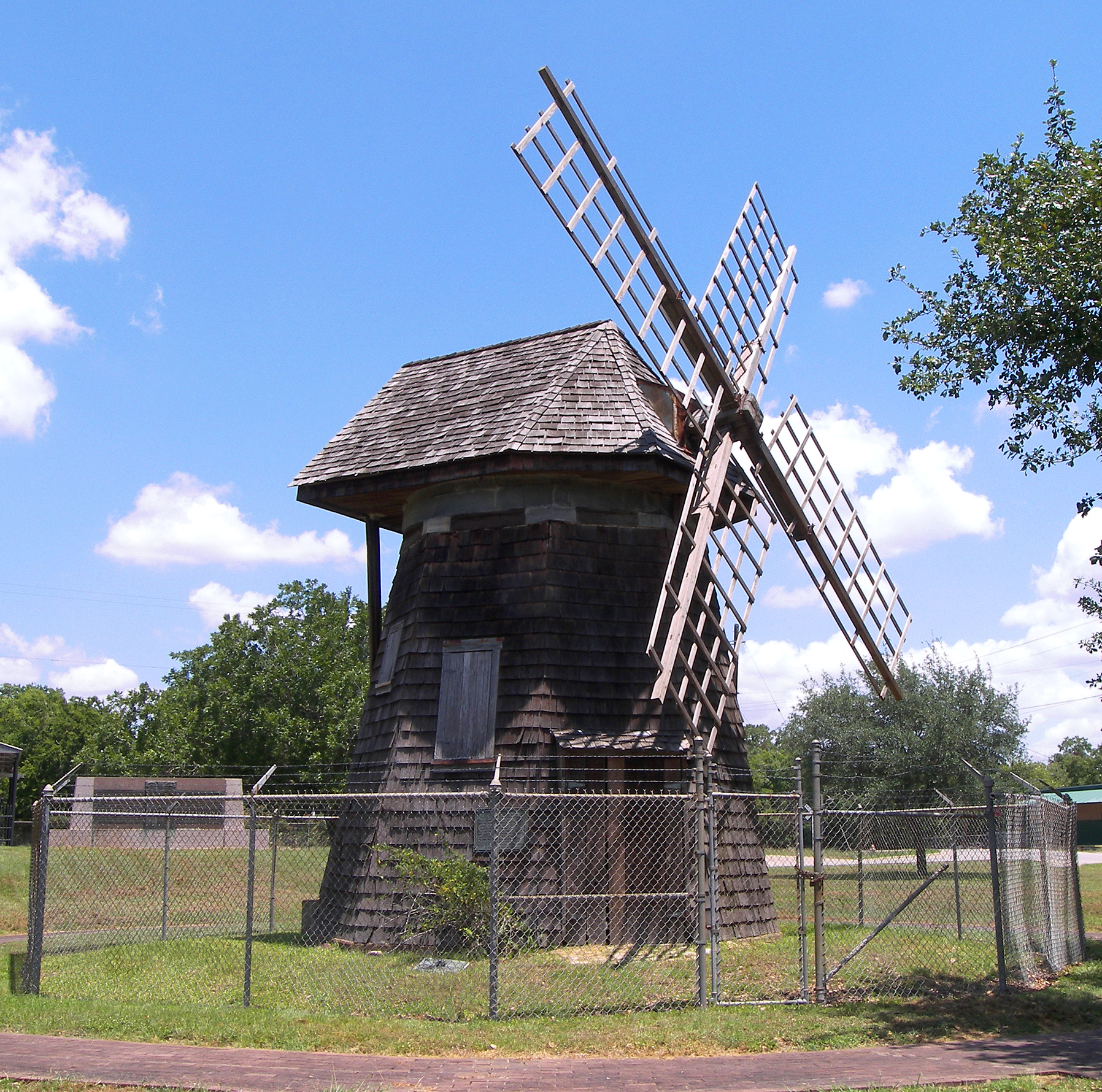
A windmill, in Texas

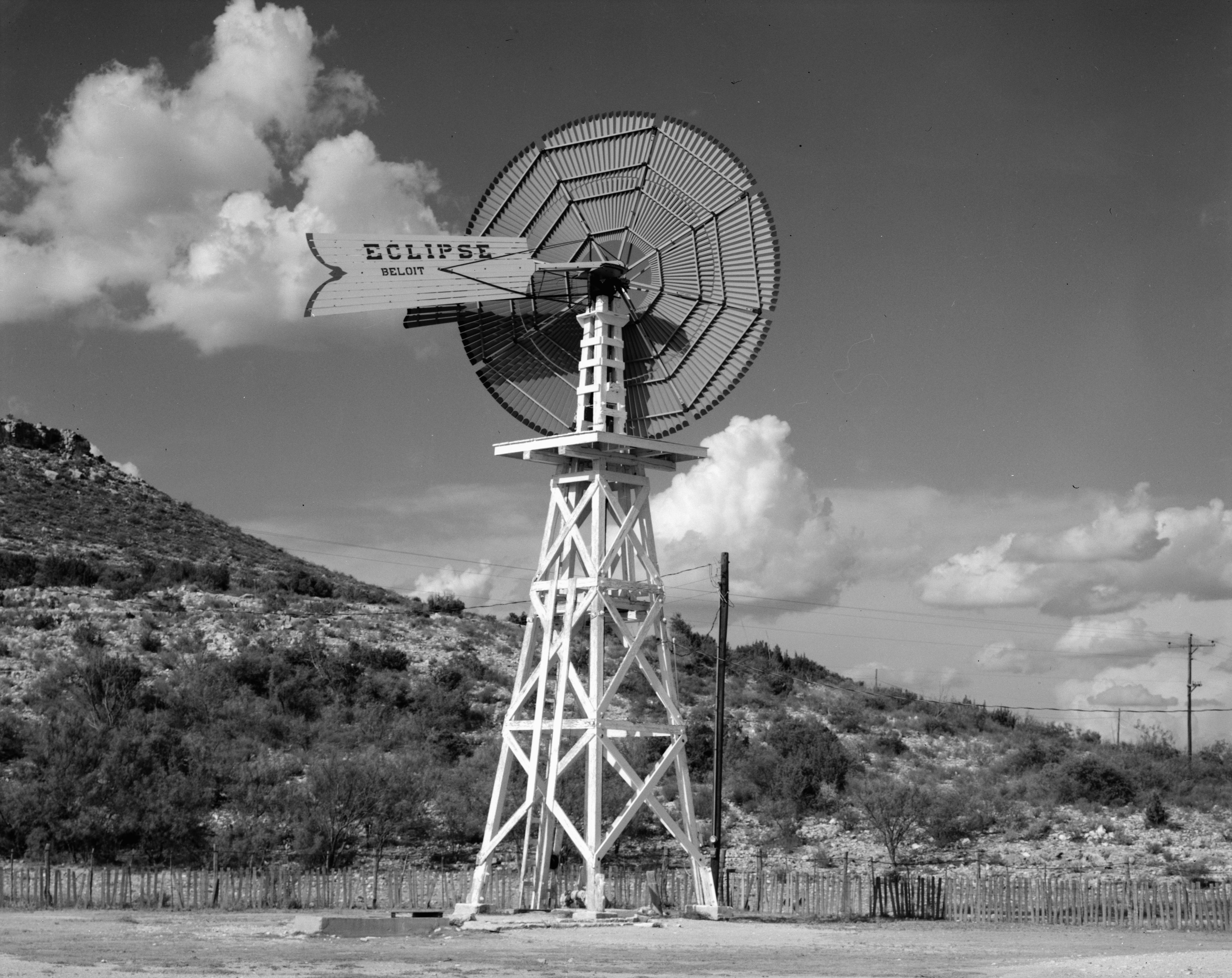
A wind pump in Texas

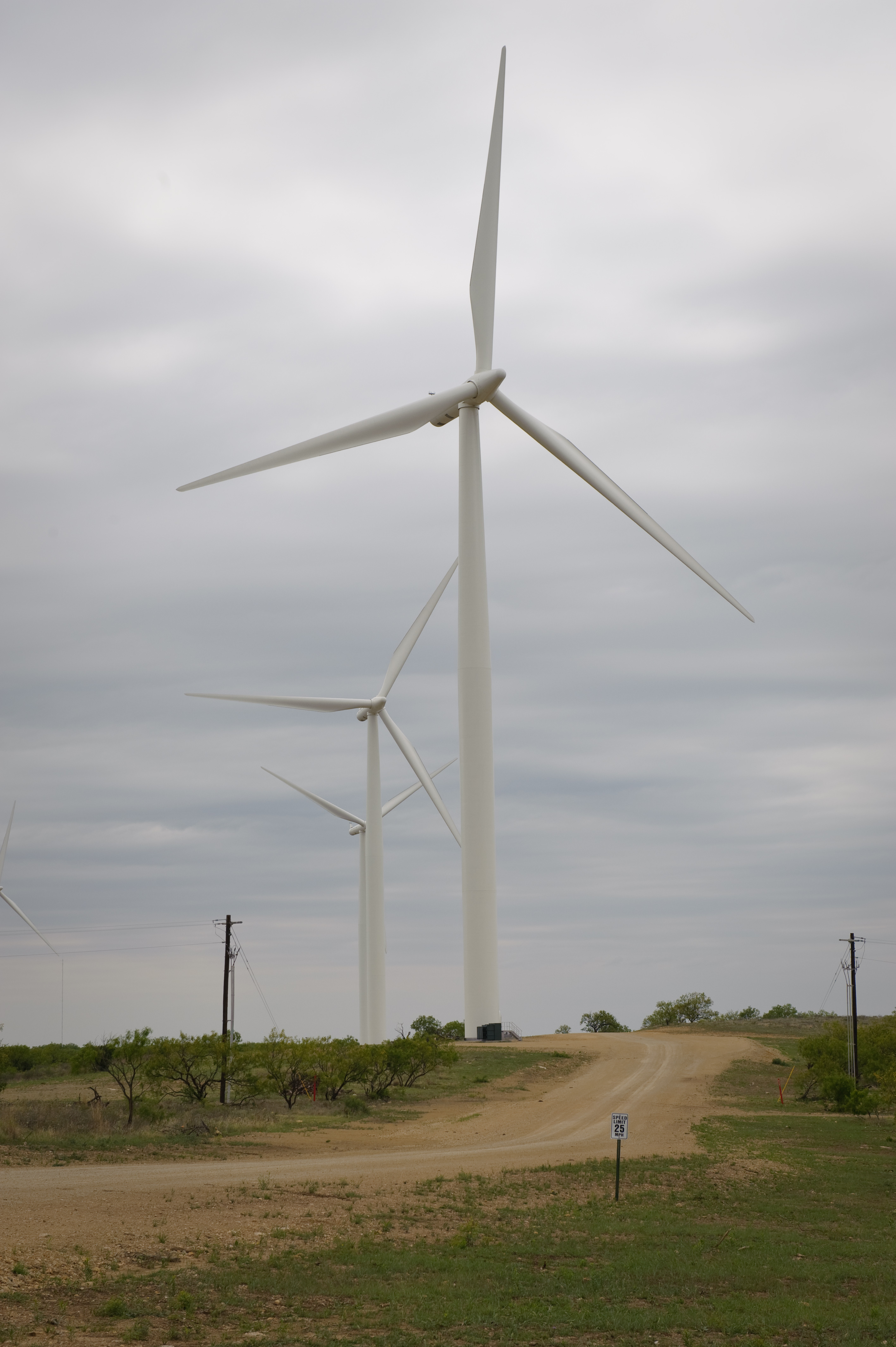
A wind turbine in Texas

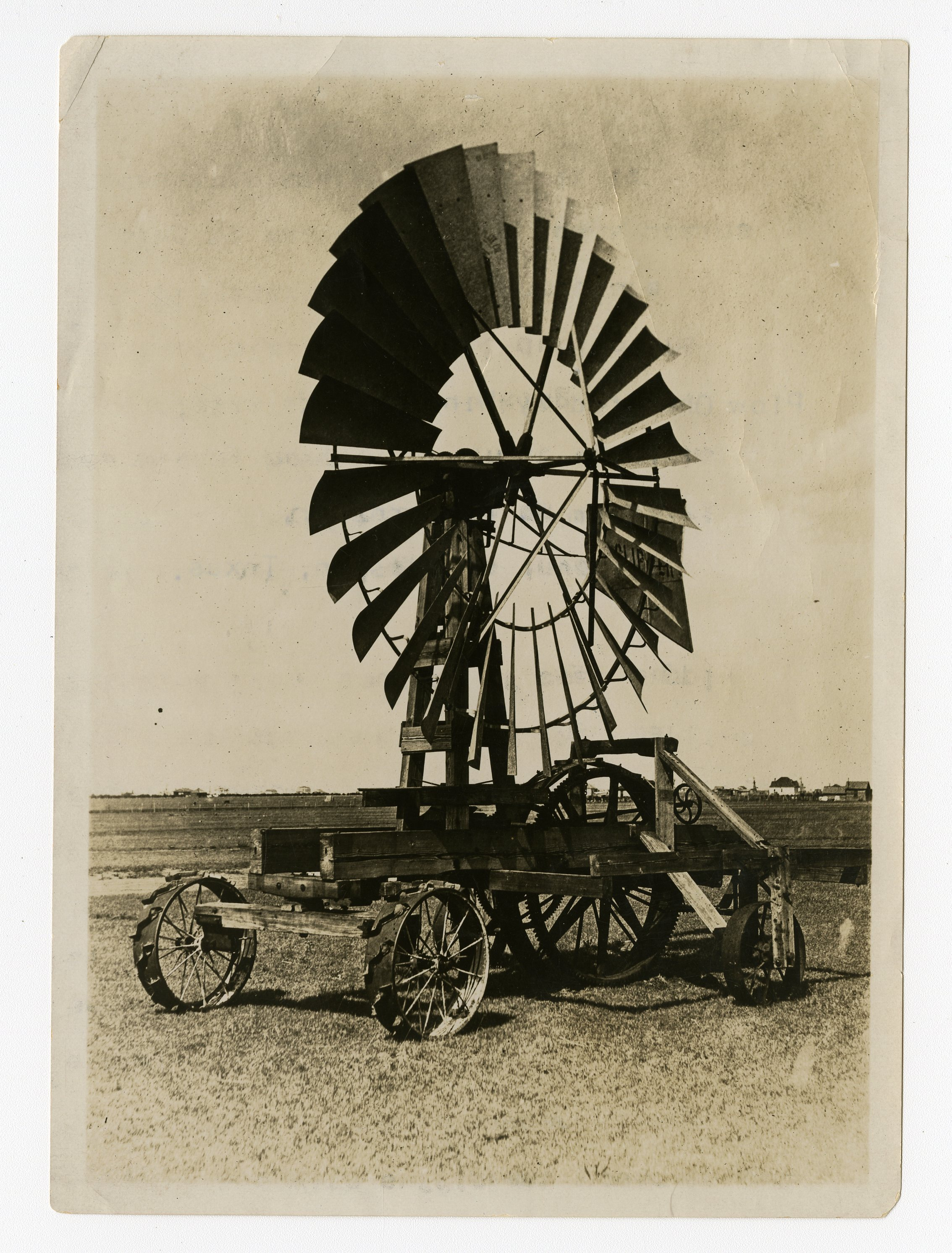
A wind engine applied unusually, to power a plow, in Texas

This list aims to include only traditional-type windmills, with the exception that it also includes NRHP-listed historic windpumps known as windmills, such as the "Iron Turbine Windmill" in Arizona.

Windmills having coordinates below may be seen together in a map: click on "Map all coordinates using OpenSourceMap" at right of this page.

== Arizona ==
Windmill	Location	Type	Built	Notes	Image
Iron Turbine mill	Prescott; 34°32′30″N 112°28′27″W	Iron windpump	1876		

== California ==
Windmill	Location	Type	Built	Notes	Image
Murphy Windmill	San Francisco	Smock	1905	Appeared in the film A Jitney Elopement starring Charlie Chaplin; Windmill World	
Dutch Windmill	San Francisco	Tower	1902	Windmill World	
	Solvang	Smock			

== Florida ==
Windmill	Location	Type	Built	Notes	Image
Windmill	Carl Fisher Casino, Miami Beach	Tower	1920	1926	

== Indiana ==
Windmill	Location	Type	Built	Notes	Image
Robertson Mill	Kendalville	Post	2000	Replica of Robertson Mill, Williamsburg, Virginia	

== Iowa ==
Windmill	Location	Type	Built	Notes	Image
Danish Mill	Elk Horn; 41.58957°N 95.060371°W	Smock	1976	Built in 1848 at Nørre-Snede, Denmark. Dismantled 1975 and re-erected at Elk Horn in 1976.	
Vermeer Mill	Pella Historical Village, Pella; 41.40649°N 92.91446°W	Smock	2002		

== Kansas ==
Windmill	Location	Type	Built	Notes	Image
Windmill	Reamsville	Smock	1879	Moved to Smith Center, 1938	
Old Dutch Mill	Smith Center; 39°46.85′N 98°47.04′W	Smock	1938		
Old Dutch Mill	Wamego; 39°12′13″N 96°18′08″W	Tower	1925		
Windmill	near Wamego (12 miles (19 km) north of town)	Tower	1879	Dismantled 1925 and re-erected at Wamego.	

== Maine ==
Windmill	Location	Type	Built	Notes	Image
Bailey Farm mill	Anson; 44°51′45″N 69°55′49″W		1905		
Hatch's Mill	Castine		c1800 1815		
Windmill at 12 Madockawando Rd.	12 Madockawando Rd., Castine; 44.38355°N 68.81064°W			"antique windmill folly was built as a piano studio over a century ago"	

== Michigan ==
Windmill	Location	Type	Built	Notes	Image
Greenfield Mill	Dearborn	Smock	1660 in Massachusetts	Windmill World	
	Hickory Corners	Smock	1927	Moved here from Heeg, Friesland, Netherlands.	
De Zwaan	Holland	Smock	1761 in the Netherlands		

== Minnesota ==
Location	Name of mill and coordinates	Type	Built	Notes	Image
Seppman Mill	Minneopa State Park, Mankato; 44.162188°N 94.102180°W	Tower	1864		

== Missouri ==
Windmill	Location	Type	Built	Notes	Image
Bevo Mill	St. Louis; 38.58174°N 90.26697°W	Smock			

== New Jersey ==
Windmill	Location	Type	Built	Notes	Image
Volendam Mill	Holland Township; 40.5966°N 75.1639°W	Smock	1965		
Great Western Mill	Paulus Hook, New Jersey; 40.71659°N 74.03348°W	Smock	1806	Edge's father shipped it to him from England. Built in Brooklyn Heights, moved to Paulus Hook 1812, moved to Southold 1839, Burnt 1870	

== New Mexico ==
Windmill	Location	Type	Built	Notes	Image
Eclipse mill	Moriarty; 34°59′48″N 106°04′55″W		1890		

== South Carolina ==
Windmill	Location	Type	Built	Notes	Image
Windmill	Marsh Island		1789	Demolished 1852.	

== South Dakota ==
Windmill	Location	Type	Built	Notes	Image
Holland Grist Windmill	Milbank; 45°13′18″N 96°37′10″W	Smock mill	1882	Windmill World	

== Tennessee ==
Windmill	Location	Type	Built	Notes	Image
McKenzie Windmill	Georgetown; 35°21′23″N 84°54′55″W	Iron windpump	1931		

== Texas ==
Windmill	Location	Type	Built	Notes	Image
Canon Ranch Railroad Eclipse Windmill	Sheffield; 30°44′44″N 101°58′30″W	Iron windpump	1898		
Victoria Grist Windmill	Victoria; 28°48′04″N 97°00′05″W	Smock	1870		

== Vermont ==
Windmill	Location	Type	Built	Notes	Image
Windmill	Alburgh	Tower	c1731	Standing 1749	

== Virginia ==
Windmill	Location	Type	Built	Notes	Image
Flowerdew Hundred Mill	Flowerdew Hundred		1612		
Flowerdew Hundred Mill	Flowerdew Hundred	Post	1978		
Robertson Mill	Williamsburg	Post	1621	Standing in 1723.	
Robertson Mill	Williamsburg	Post			
Buckner's Mill	Yorktown	Smock	1711	Destroyed by tornado in late 19th century	
Akers′ Mill	Yorktown	Smock	2011	Reconstruction of William Buckner's Mill near original site	

== Washington ==
Windmill	Location	Type	Built	Notes	Image
Cambern Mill	Spokane; 47°38′43″N 117°23′20″W		1929		

== Wisconsin ==
Windmill	Location	Type	Built	Notes	Image
Davidson Windmill	Superior; 46°38′56″N 91°54′21″W	Smock	1900	Eight sails	
Little Chute Windmill	Little Chute; 44°17′3″N 88°18′49″W	Smock		Constructed by Verbij Hoogmade BV	
Waupun Dutch Windmill	Waupun; 44°17′3″N 88°18′49″W	Smock			
Pilgrim Family Farmstead					
Windmill at Robert M. Lamp Cottage	Lake Mendota, Madison				Windmill built 1902–03 to bring water to Frank Lloyd Wright-designed cottage on an island in Lake Mendota.
Romeo and Juliet Windmill					

== Insular Areas ==
=== Puerto Rico ===
Windmill	Location	Type	Built	Notes	Image
Ingenio Azucarero Vives	Guayama; 17°58′45″N 66°7′3″W	Tower	1828	Spanish colonial sugar mill	

=== US Virgin Islands ===
Windmill	Type	Built	Notes	Image
Estate La Reine				
Estate Mount Victory				

== See also ==
- List of windmills
- Wind power in Rhode Island

== Notes ==
Known building dates are in bold text. Non-bold text denotes first known date. Iron windpumps are outside the scope of this list unless listed on the National Register of Historic Places.

== Sources ==
- Pulling, Anne Frances; Leeds, Gerald A. (1999). Windmills and Water Mills of Long Island. Charleston, SC: Arcadia. ISBN 0-7385-0288-X.
- Lombardo, Donald (2003). Windmills of New England, Their Genius, Madness, History & Future. Cape Cod, MA: On Cape Publications. ISBN 0-9719547-7-1.
- Unless stated otherwise, the source for all entries is the Windmill World website.
