= Christian Holter Lysfabrikk =

Former Norwegian candle and soap manufacturer

- Formerly: Christian Holter A/S
- Type: Aksjeselskap
- Industry: Manufacturing
- Founded: 1893
- Defunct: 1984
- Fate: Acquired by Freia; later closed
- Headquarters: Oslo; later Halden, Norway
- Products: Candles, soap, oils

Christian Holter Lysfabrikk (formally Christian Holter A/S) was a Norwegian company with a large production of candles and soap that also ran a fish-oil refinery. Founded in Oslo in 1893, it exported whale and fish oils to most European countries from the late 19th century. The company began with soft soap, hand soap, cart grease, and chicory and traded in whale and fish oils, then took up candle production and became one of the country's largest and leading makers in that field. Its factory was at Vaterland in Oslo until the area was redeveloped in the 1960s, after which it built a new factory at Frysjaveien on Kjelsås.

In 1966 the factory was sold by the Holter family to Freia, which moved it from Oslo to Halden in 1968 as part of efforts to bring Oslo companies to a town hard hit by the decline of its shoe industry. Around 1980 Freia sold the Halden candle factory to Collett-Marwell Hauge, which also owned the Tyri candle factory in Krødsherad; production was soon transferred to Tyri, and in 1984 the Halden factory and Christian Holter were closed.

== Bibliography ==
- Ibsen, Hilde. Et lite stykke Norge: Freia 100 år.
