= Golden Gate Park windmills =

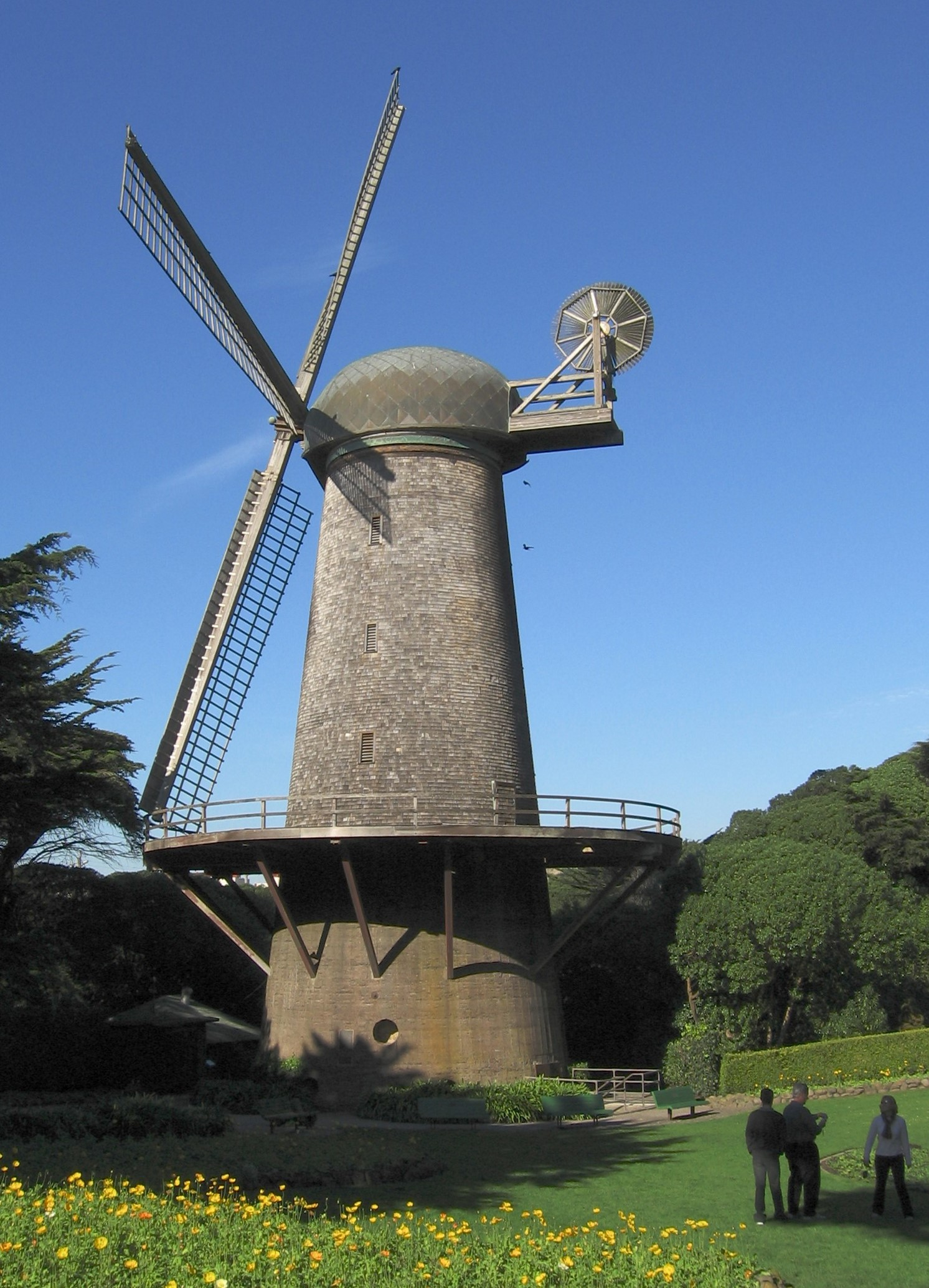

The Golden Gate Park windmills are two historic windmills located at Golden Gate Park in San Francisco, California.

- Dutch Windmill (Golden Gate Park), the northern of two functioning windmills, completed in 1903
- Murphy Windmill, the southern of two functioning windmills, completed in 1908
