= Stomatol =

Swedish toothpaste brand

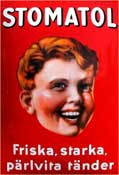
Poster for Stomatol

Stomatol is a brand of toothpaste first sold in Sweden at the beginning of the 20th century. It was particularly notable as having been one of the first Swedish brands to recognise and to use the power of mass media. The brand was originally made by the soap manufacturer Grumme & Son, acquired 1985 by pharmaceutical company Cederroth AB. The company made extensive use of press, film and signs, both enamel and neon.

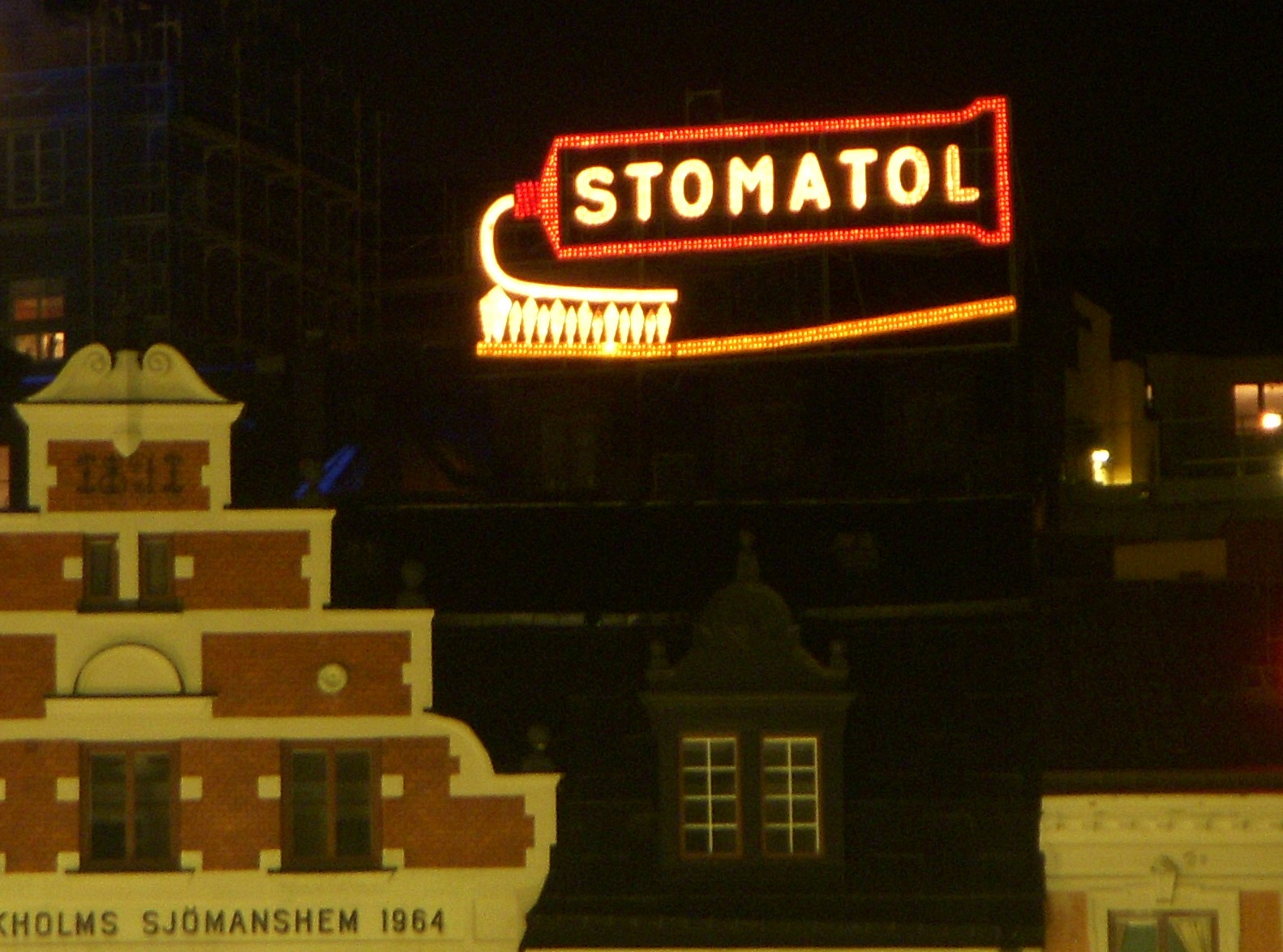
Illuminated Stomatol sign, 2009

It is particularly known for the large advertisement sign which has been a prominent local landmark at Slussen in Stockholm since 1909. The Stomatol Sign, made from lightbulbs, not neon tubes, was the first animated advertisement sign in Sweden (one can see the toothpaste being squeezed out of the tube). It was originally placed on the Katarinahissen elevator, but was moved in 1933 to the roof of the nearby building at Klevgränd 1 B. Technical problems forced the electricity to be shut down between 1963 and 1972 and from 1981 until 1986.

Many Stomatol film commercials were animated. At least ten of the commercials produced in and around 1930 were drawn by Arvid Olson and Victor Bergdahl, creator of Captain Grogg.

Live action, near-feature quality ads were produced around that time by Kinocentralen and which starred popular Swedish comedic actor Thor Modéen. Modéen was well known for living a rather extravagant lifestyle, mostly paid for through his work for Stomatol.

The brand's slogan was "Stomatol - the only way to obtain healthy and strong teeth!"

Stomatol was also manufactured and sold in Norway. Stomatol toothpaste was first manufactured by Carl A. Høyers Stomatolfabrikk in Oslo, which held the exclusive rights for the Norwegian market in 1896. They continued to make Stomatol until they were acquired by competitor Marwell Hauge in 1970, and the Stomatol brand name was discontinued in Norway some time after.

From its beginnings, Stomatol devoted part of its budget to advertising, whether in newspapers or in the streets. At the turn of the twentieth century, a building located at the 92-94 Regeringsgatan in Stockholm sported a large Stomatol painting.

== External links and references ==
- History and photographs of early Stomatol film advertisements, at the website of the Swedish National Archive of Recorded Sound and Moving Images (SLBA)
- Martin Stugart, "Vem har skapat Stomatolskylten?" ("Who has created the Stomatol sign?"), reply to a letter from a reader, in a regular column on local Stockholm history in Dagens Nyheter (accessed January 18, 2006)
