= Carl A. Høyers Stomatolfabrikk =

Former Norwegian toothpaste manufacturer

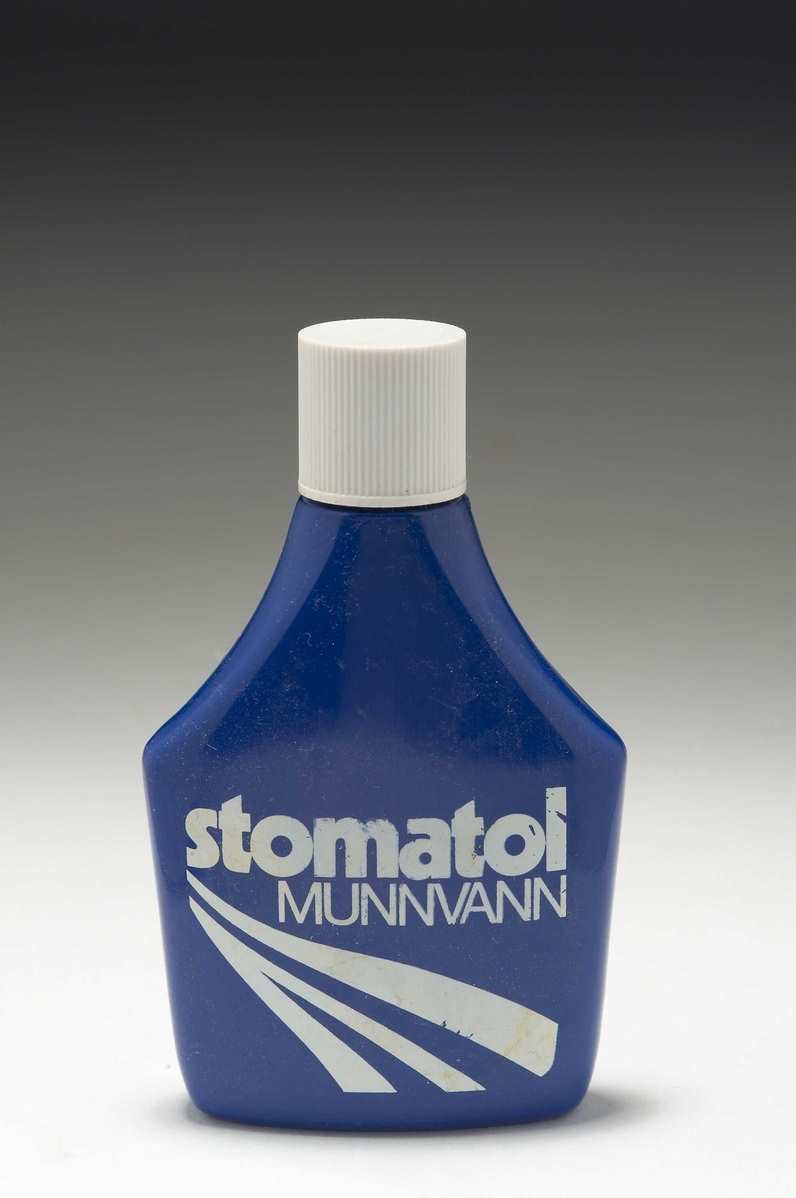
- Type: Aksjeselskap
- Industry: Cosmetics
- Founded: 1896
- Founder: Carl A. Høyer
- Defunct: 1970
- Fate: Acquired by Marwell Hauge
- Headquarters: Oslo, Norway
- Products: Toothpaste, cosmetics

Carl A. Høyers Stomatolfabrikk was a Norwegian manufacturer of dental-care products and cosmetics in Oslo, founded in 1896 by Carl A. Høyer (1857–1932). It was the first Norwegian company to produce toothpaste on a large scale. It held the Norwegian licence for the Swedish toothpaste brand Stomatol, which became a leading dental-care product in the country.

The company was acquired by the competitor Marwell Hauge in 1970 and later became part of Collett-Marwell Hauge. The Stomatol brand was discontinued around 1985.
