= Cederroth =

Swedish pharmaceuticals company

Cederroth AB is a Swedish pharmaceuticals company which manufactures and markets personal care, healthcare, wound care, household and first aid products. Founded in 1895 in Gävle, by Christian Cederroth, it is based in Upplands Väsby.

In 2015 Norwegian conglomerate Orkla acquired Cederroth.

Its brands include Acta, Stomatol, Samarin, Svinto, Grumme, Pharbio, Allévo, HTH and Salvequick.
