= Davidson Windmill =

- U.S. National Register of Historic Places
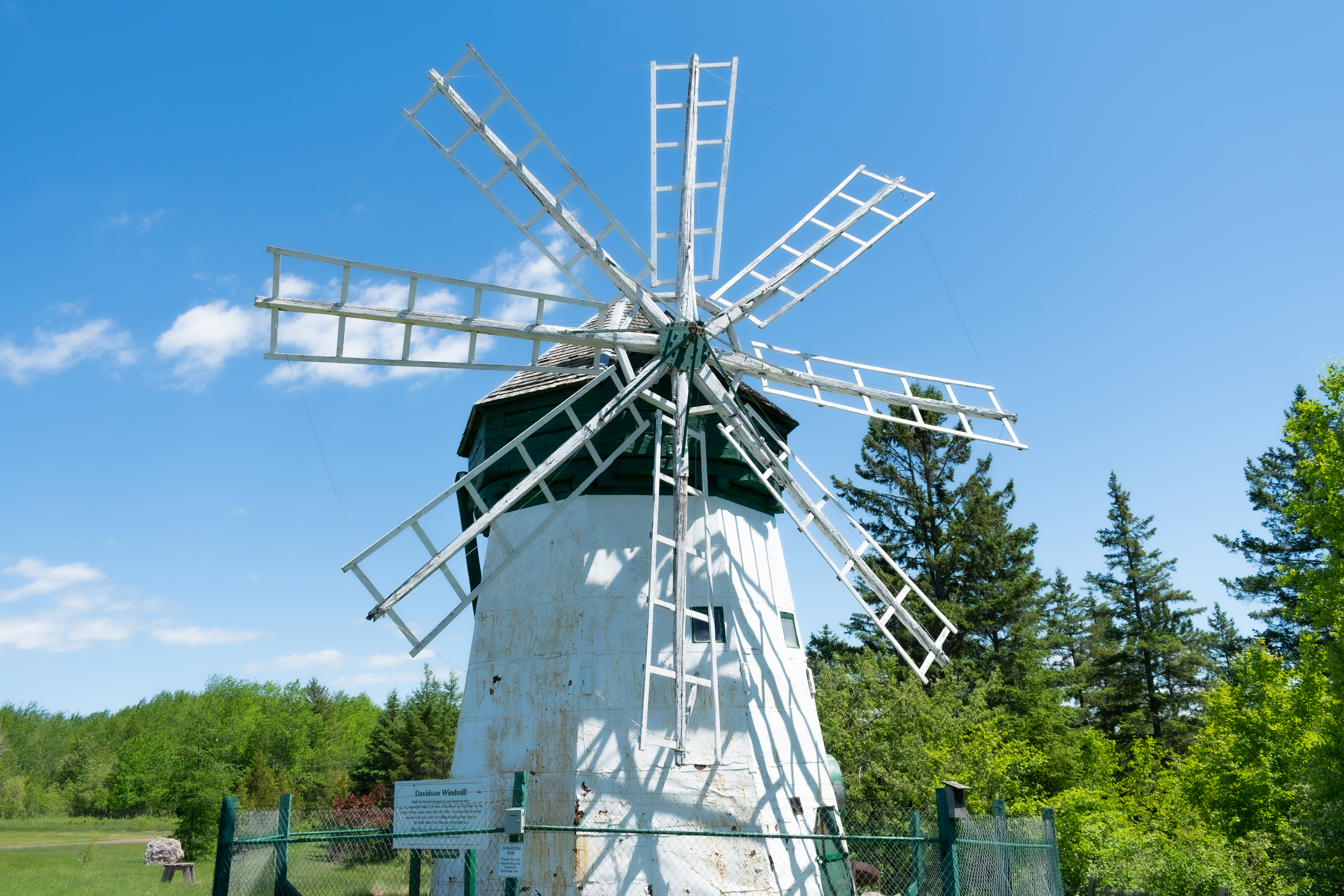
- Davidson Windmill in 2022

- Location within Wisconsin Location within the United States
- Nearest city: Superior, Wisconsin
- Coordinates: 46°38′56″N 91°54′21″W
- Built: 1900
- Architect: Jacob Davidson
- NRHP reference No.: 79000075
- Added to NRHP: August 3, 1979

Davidson Windmill is a historic windmill in Lakeside, Wisconsin, United States. The windmill was built in 1900 and added to the National Register of Historic Places in 1979. The grist mill was built by Jacob Davidson in 1904 and operated until 1926.

== See also ==
- Little Chute Windmill: Another historic windmill in Wisconsin
