= Collett-Marwell Hauge =

Former Norwegian pharmaceutical company

- Formerly: Collett Pharma
- Company type: Aksjeselskap
- Industry: Pharmaceuticals
- Founded: 1974
- Fate: Acquired by Hafslund Nycomed (1990); later Orkla
- Headquarters: Asker, Norway
- Key people: Emil Collett
- Products: Vitamin preparations, dietary supplements, pharmaceuticals

Collett-Marwell Hauge was a Norwegian pharmaceutical company established in 1974, which manufactured vitamin preparations, dietary supplements, and pharmaceuticals, and also engaged in wholesale trade. The company was formed by the merger of Collett & Co, founded in 1933 by Emil Collett to make the vitamin drink Sana-Sol, and the pharmaceutical company Marwell Hauge, founded in 1940. The head office was in Asker.

== History ==
=== Collett ===
Collett & Co AS had its first production premises in the Oslo Havnelager, where it produced Sana-Sol, a vitamin drink that became very popular, and in time vitamin tablets and pellets followed. Of particular interest to Collett was the licensing of its production methods to companies all over the world. Collett moved up to Sandaker in Oslo and established a factory there, on a road later renamed Vitaminveien, and in 1967 the company moved to Asker, expanding production to include baby food, special diets, nutritional products, and iron tablets. Collett also held agencies for several foreign pharmaceutical factories, such as Boots of England, Boehringer Ingelheim of Germany, Orion of Finland, Hässle of Sweden, and Byk-Gulden of Germany.

=== Marwell Hauge ===
Marwell Hauge had its own products, of which the hand cream Spenol is the best known and gained a large market. The company also held agencies, among them the pharmaceutical agencies of the American companies Lilly and Lederle.

Collett-Marwell Hauge was acquired by Hafslund Nycomed in 1990 and later became part of Nycomed Pharma. In 2004 Johan Henrik Andresen Jr. and his company Ferd took over the company, then called Collett Pharma, from Nycomed, and in 2005 Orkla took over Collett Pharma, wanting the company to become an important part of Orkla's focus on healthcare products.
