= COTALAND =

Amusement park complex in Texas, United States

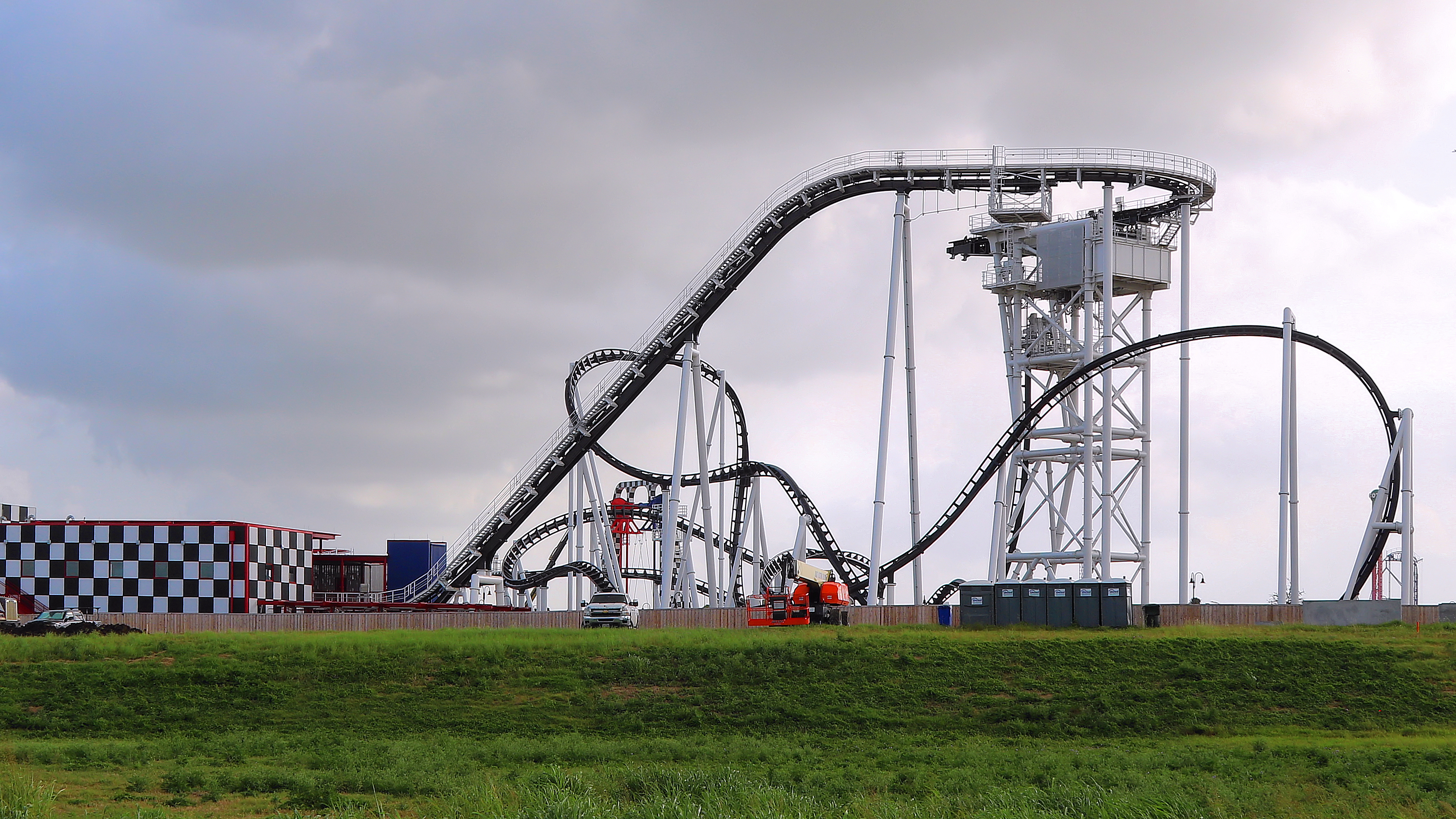
- Circuit Breaker tilt coaster
- Interactive map of COTALAND
- Location: Austin, Texas, United States
- Coordinates: 30.137°N 97.641°W
- Status: Operating
- Opened: September 26, 2026

Attractions
- Total: 34 (as of 2026)
- Roller coasters: 5
- Website: cotaland.com

COTALAND is a amusement park complex on the grounds of the Circuit of the Americas racetrack near Austin, Texas, United States. COTALAND opened September 26, 2026.

== History ==
COTA first announced plans to build a theme park near the circuit in 2021 with plans to open the first rides in 2022. It is now expected to fully open in 2026. The park will feature more than 30 rides on 30 acres near the Grand Prix track of COTA. On October 19-20, 2025, Circuit Breaker, the park's Vekoma Tilt Coaster, opened for preview rides on a pay-per-ride basis.

On August 18, 2026, COTALAND announced that their grand opening would be on September 26.

== Rides ==
=== Roller coasters ===
Current name	Year opened	Manufacturer	Type	Thrill Level	Height requirement	Description
Big Apple	2021	Levent Lunapark	Roller coaster			A basic "Wacky Worm" coaster
Circuit Breaker	2025	Vekoma	Roller coaster	Extreme	48 inches	Steel roller coaster billed as the "only Tilt Coaster in Texas"
Skyflyer	2020	SBF Visa Group	Roller coaster			Simple family coaster with an oval layout
Retro Rambler	2021	Schwarzkopf	Roller coaster			A Schwarzkopf Wildcat coaster
Palindrome	2026	Gerstlauer	Roller coaster	Extreme	48 inches	A shuttle Infinity Coaster with a vertical lift and turntable

=== Flat rides ===
Current name	Year opened	Manufacturer	Type	Thrill Level	Height requirement	Description
The Soggy Logger	2026		Log flume	Medium	42 inches	A basic log flume
Safari Adventure	2026		Track ride	Relaxed	42 inches unaccompanied	A "Track Ride"
Cloud Flyer	2026	Funtime	Star Flyer	Medium	44 inches	A Star Flyer from Funtime, with a height of 150 feet
Medusa	2026		Octopus	Mild	42 inches	An octopus ride akin to Monster at Cedar Point
Cosmic Glider	2026	S&S – Sansei	Screamin' Swing	Extreme	48 inches	A Screamin' Swing from S&S
Cotaland Express	2026		Train ride	Relaxed	36 inches	
Downforce	2026	Funtime	Drop Tower	Extreme	48 inches	Gyro drop tower from Funtime
Grand Carousel	2026		Carousel	Relaxed	36 inches	
Lil' Loggers	2026		Mini log flume	Mild	36 inches	
Tree House Bounce	2026		Frog Hopper	Mild	36 inches	A Frog Hopper
Turbos Tilt n Twist	2026		Tilt-a-Whirl	Medium	46 inches	Tilt-a-whirl
