= Pilgrim Family Farmstead =

- U.S. National Register of Historic Places
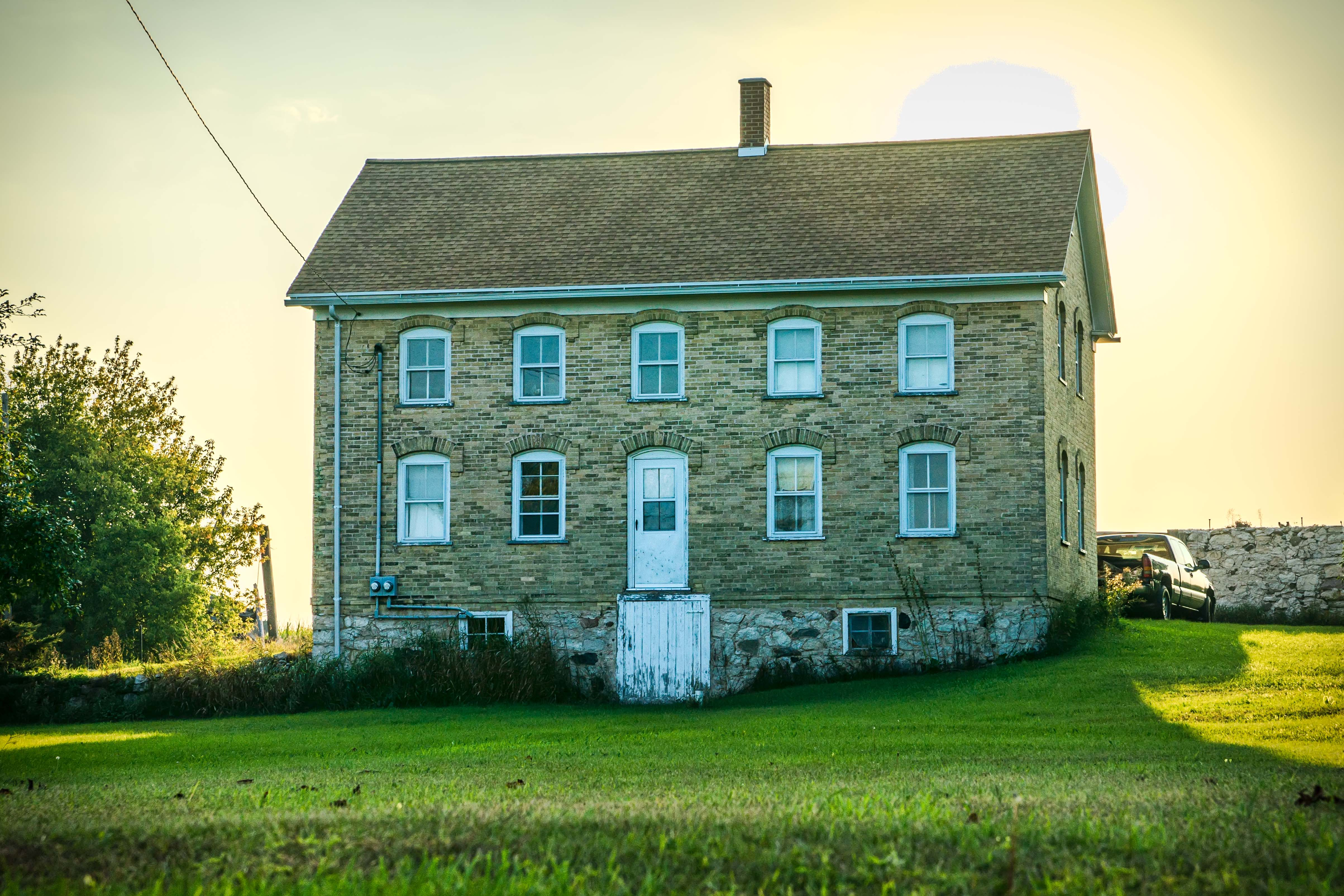

- Location within Wisconsin Location within the United States
- Location: Southwest of Kewaunee on Church Rd.
- Coordinates: 44.5313361°N 87.549919°W
- Area: 5.7 acres (2.3 ha)
- NRHP reference No.: 79000091

Significant dates
- Added to NRHP: May 8, 1979
- Designated: Building

The Pilgrim Family Farmstead near Kewaunee, Wisconsin was listed on the National Register of Historic Places in 1979. It has also been known as Rasmussen Farm.

The farm complex includes a two-story brick veneered frame farmhouse building, on a three-foot thick fieldstone foundation. It has a one-story kitchen wing.

It has a barn with a later windmill addition that is almost as large as the barn itself.
