= Iron Turbine Windmill =

- U.S. National Register of Historic Places
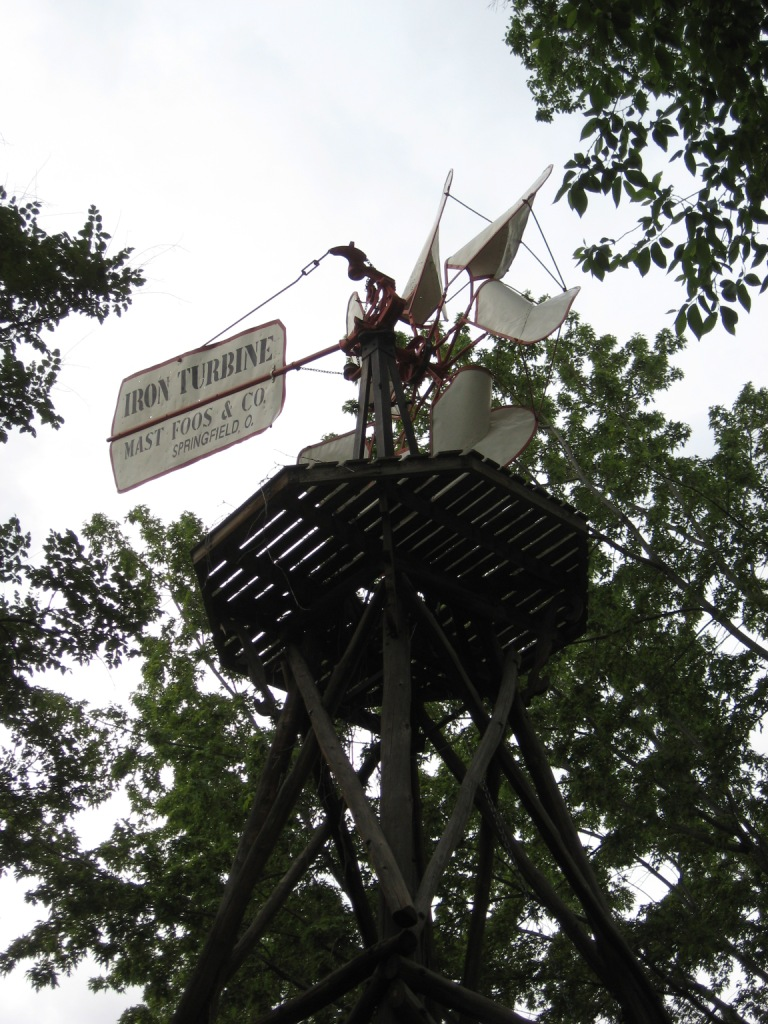
- Photo from below in 2008

- Location within Arizona Location within the United States
- Location: Prescott, Arizona, USA
- Coordinates: 34°32′30″N 112°28′27″W
- Built: c. 1880
- Architect: Mast, Foos and Co.
- NRHP reference No.: 81000139
- Added to NRHP: July 9, 1981

Iron Turbine Windmill is a historic windmill at 415 W. Gurley Street, on the grounds of the Sharlot Hall Museum in Prescott, Arizona. It is technically a windpump, but the American term is windmill.

The windmill was built in the period from 1876 to 1885. It was added to the National Register of Historic Places in 1981.

According to its National Register nomination,

The "Iron Turbine" windmill is the sole known intact example of the first mass produced all-metal windmill remaining in the Southwest and probably the United States. Produced by Mast, Foos and Company of Springfield, Ohio, from 1876 to ca. 1898, the mill is highly significant as it relates to the technical evolution of turbine wheeltype water pumping windmills. The iron and steel construction figured prominently in advertising. The company proudly declared that their mill, "with no wood about it to swell, shrink, rattle and be torn to pieces by the wind" naturally was "much more durable" than any of its wooden competitors. As early as 1884, they could boast that their mills were in use in all the states and territories of the United States as well as in England, France, Germany, Russia, Australia, New Zealand and the Sandwich Islands.
