= Hafslund Nycomed =

Norwegian power and pharmaceutical company

Hafslund Nycomed A/S
- Industry: Power; Pharmaceuticals
- Founded: 1986
- Defunct: 1996
- Fate: Demerger
- Successor: Hafslund; Nycomed Amersham
- Headquarters: Norway

Hafslund Nycomed is a defunct company that existed between 1986 and 1996 after the power and industry company Hafslund had bought the pharmaceutical company Nycomed. The company was listed on the Oslo Stock Exchange. In 1996 it was demerged and Nycomed merged with the British pharmaceutical company Amersham, while Hafslund took the power division.
