= Estate Mount Victory =

- U.S. National Register of Historic Places
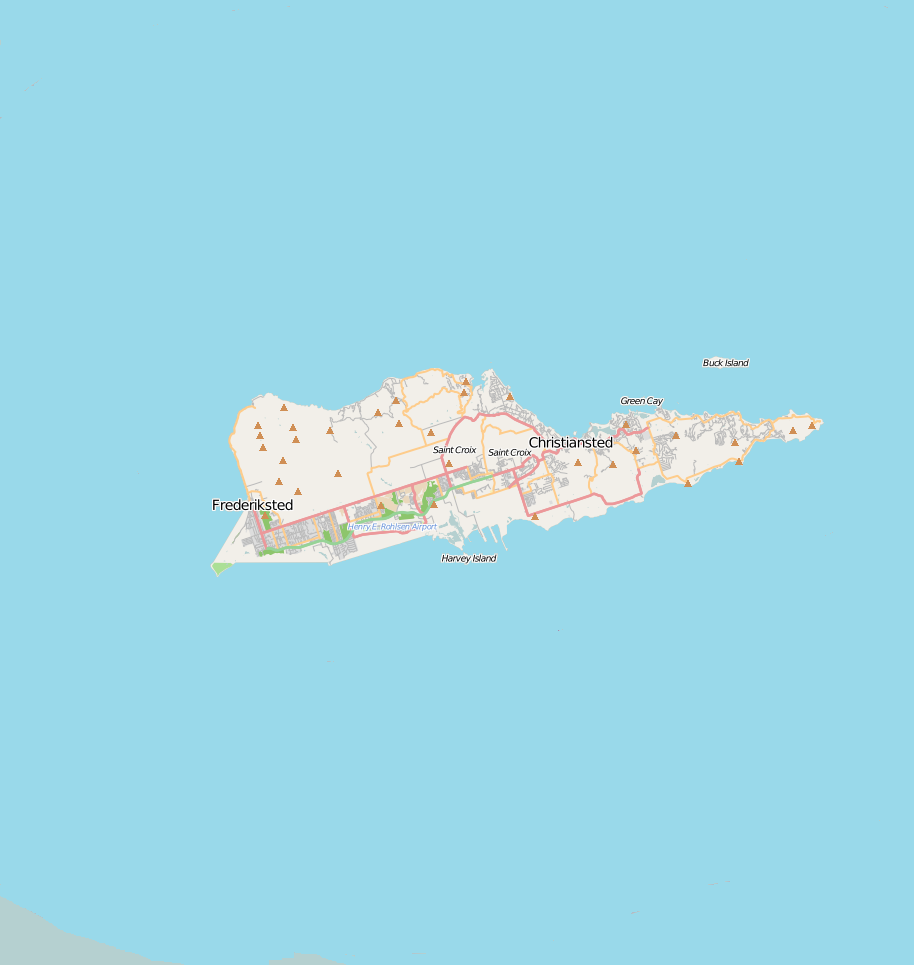
- Location within Saint Croix, US Virgin Islands Location within the U.S. Virgin Islands
- Nearest city: Frederiksted, Virgin Islands
- Coordinates: 17°45′13″N 64°52′05″W
- Area: 7 acres (2.8 ha)
- Built: 1849
- NRHP reference No.: 78002724
- Added to NRHP: February 17, 1978

Estate Mount Victory, near Frederiksted on Saint Croix in the U.S. Virgin Islands, is a sugar plantations listed on the National Register of Historic Places in 1978. The listing included five contributing sites on 7 acres (2.8 ha).

Ruins of a factory, an animal mill, a steam mill chimney, a wind mill, outbuildings and Mt. Victory School are on the property. It is located about 2.6 miles (4.2 km) northeast of Frederiksted on a high hill in Northside A Quarter, St. Croix.
