= Little Chute Windmill =

Dutch smock mill in the United States

- Interactive map of Little Chute Windmill

Origin
- Mill name: Little Chute Windmill
- Mill location: Little Chute, Wisconsin
- Coordinates: 44.280204°N 88.316805°W

Information
- Type: Smock mill
- Storeys: Three-story smock
- Base storeys: Three-story base
- Smock sides: Eight sides
- No. of sails: Four sails
- Type of sails: Common sails
- Winding: Tailpole and winch

The Little Chute Windmill and Van Asten Visitor Center is a functioning Dutch smock mill and interpretive center in Little Chute, Wisconsin, United States. The authentic wooden windmill is a tribute to the Dutch heritage of the village and the larger area known as the Fox River Valley in Wisconsin. Tours take visitors to the different levels of the windmill, allowing visitors to see the actual operation of the mill as it harnesses wind power to grind grain into flour.

The windmill and visitor center is located at 130 West Main Street in Little Chute. The windmill operates during the warmer, spring and summer months. The Visitor Center is open Saturdays through mid December.

== Windmill ==
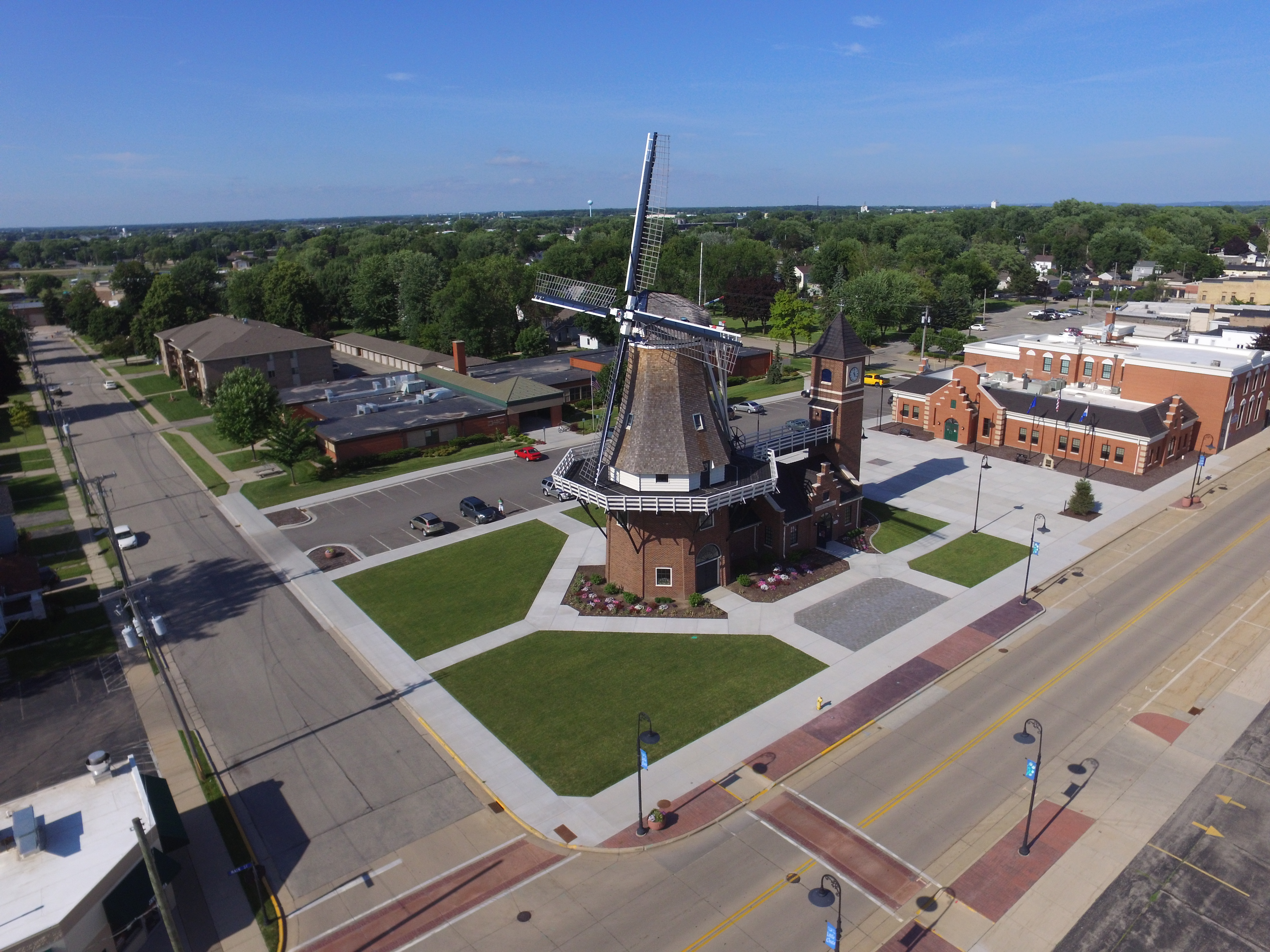
Windmill and attached visitor center.

The Windmill is an authentic 1850s design, based on similar mills from the province of North Brabant in the Netherlands, the home province of many of the first Dutch settlers to the area. The 38-meter (125 ft) high wooden windmill was designed by fourth-generation millwright Lucas Verbij of Verbij Hoogmade BV in the Netherlands. The windmill was partially constructed in the Netherlands and shipped for final assembly in Little Chute.

== Visitor Center ==
The Van Asten Visitor Center and Museum displays the history of Dutch settlement in Little Chute and the surrounding area. Displays, as well as archives, genealogy and research materials, are managed by the Little Chute Historical Society. The Museum has audio/visual and historical artifacts related to the stories of Little Chute from its beginnings through today. Also housed in the Visitor Center is a traditional Dutch Gift Shop offering specialty foods, coffee, Delft Blue, and a variety of items that depict the Dutch character of Little Chute's ancestors.
