= Murphy Windmill =

Designated landmark in San Francisco

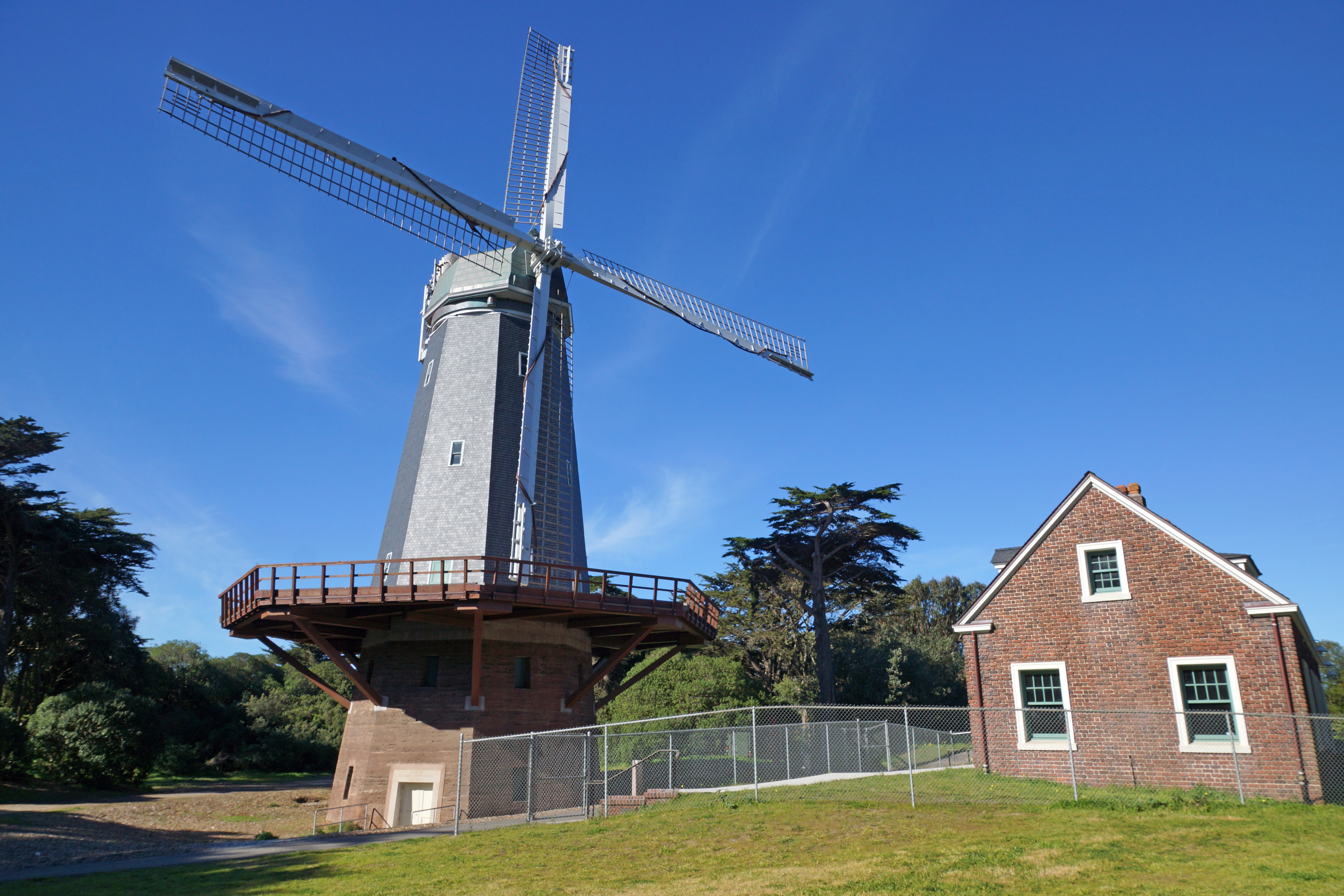
- Interactive map of Murphy Windmill

Origin
- Mill location: Golden Gate Park
- Coordinates: 37.764°N 122.508°W
- Operator: San Francisco Recreation & Parks Department
- Year built: 1908

Information
- Purpose: Water Pump
- Type: Smock
- No. of sails: 4
- Other information: 114 foot sail length San Francisco Designated Landmark

The Murphy Windmill is a functioning windmill in Golden Gate Park, San Francisco, California, United States. It was completed in 1908, and placed on the San Francisco Designated Landmark list in 2000. It is the largest windmill in the world.

== Location ==
The windmill is south of Dutch Windmill on the western edge of Golden Gate Park in San Francisco, California.

== History ==
In the 1870s and 1880s, Golden Gate Park was planted on sand dunes and required substantial irrigation. In 1902, the Park Commission authorized the construction of two windmills to pump groundwater for park irrigation rather than purchasing water at exorbitant costs from the Spring Valley Water Company. The Murphy Mill was completed in 1908, and pumped 40,000 US gallons (150,000 L) per hour to the park.

Electric water pumps replaced the need for windmills in 1913, and the mill fell into disrepair. By the 1950s, the mill was in a state of ruin. In 1964, the San Francisco Citizens Commission for the Restoration of the Golden Gate Park Windmills was formed and led by Eleanor Rossi Crabtree, daughter of former San Francisco mayor Angelo Rossi. Plans for the Murphy Mill restoration began in 2002, with a reopening in 2012.

It was placed on the San Francisco Designated Landmark list on July 2, 2000.

== Events ==
Since 2012 the Dutch community's SF Oranje Comité celebrates King's Day every year at the end of April at Murphy Mill, with the motorized windmill sails rotating. The event celebrates Dutch culture and traditions, including old Dutch kids games, flea market, Dutch food, beer, music, and dancing.

== See also ==
- Dutch Windmill
- List of windmills in the United States
