= Dutch Windmill (Golden Gate Park) =

San Francisco designated landmark

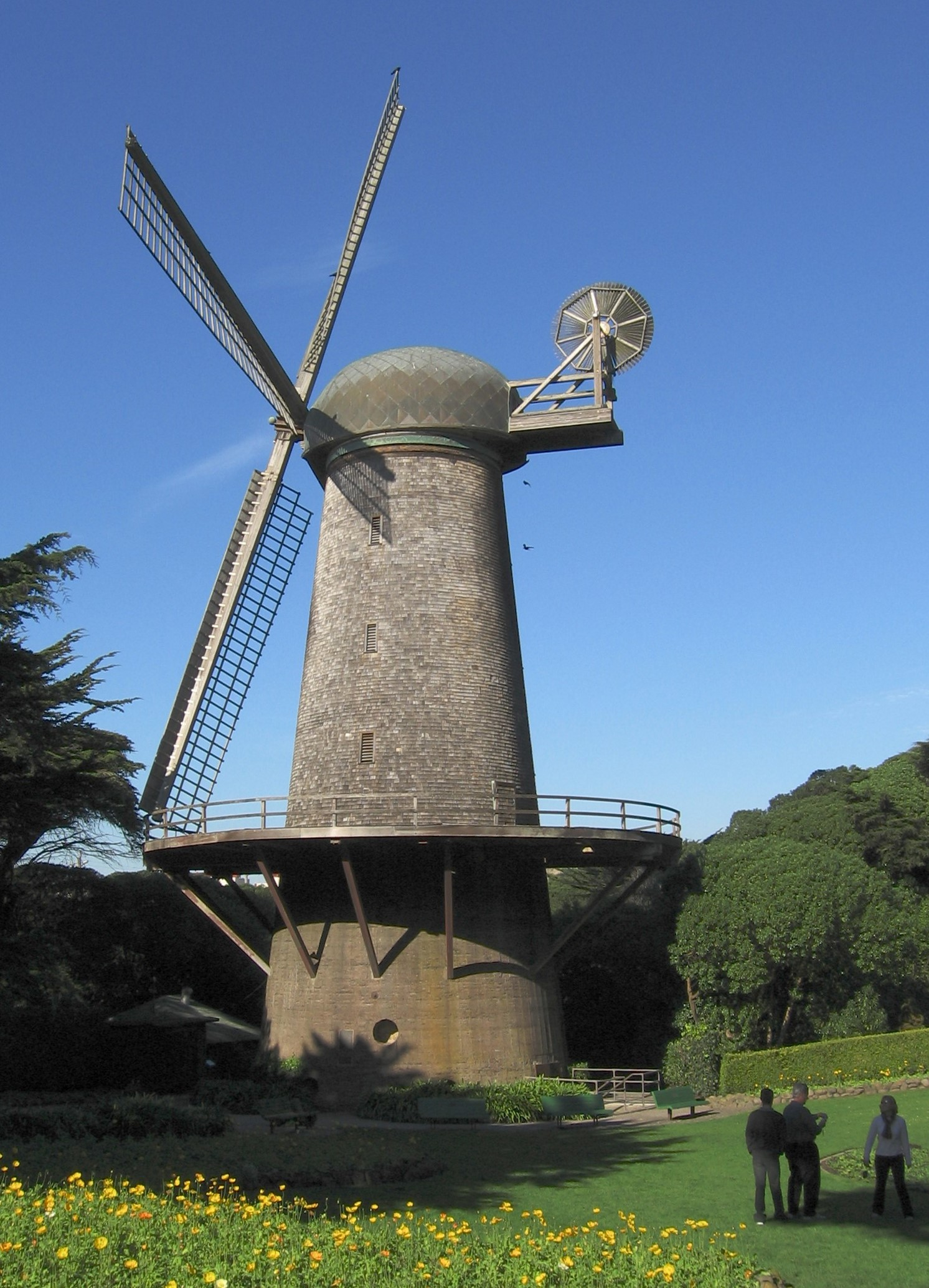
- Interactive map of Dutch Windmill

Origin
- Mill location: Golden Gate Park
- Coordinates: 37.770732°N 122.509403°W
- Operator: San Francisco Recreation & Parks Department
- Year built: 1903

Information
- Purpose: Water Pump
- Type: Tower
- No. of sails: 4
- Other information: 102 foot sail length San Francisco Designated Landmark

The Dutch Windmill is the northern of two functioning windmills, the other being Murphy Windmill, on the western edge of Golden Gate Park in San Francisco, California. It was completed in 1903, and placed on the San Francisco Designated Landmark list on December 6, 1981.

== History ==
In the 1870s and 1880s, Golden Gate Park was planted on sand dunes and required substantial irrigation. In 1902, the Park Commission authorized the construction of two windmills to pump groundwater for park irrigation rather than purchasing water at exorbitant costs from the Spring Valley Water Company. The Dutch Mill was completed one year later and pumped 30,000 US gallons (110,000 L) per hour.

Electric water pumps replaced the need for windmills in 1913, and the mill fell into disrepair. By the 1950s, the mill was in a state of ruin.

== Restoration ==
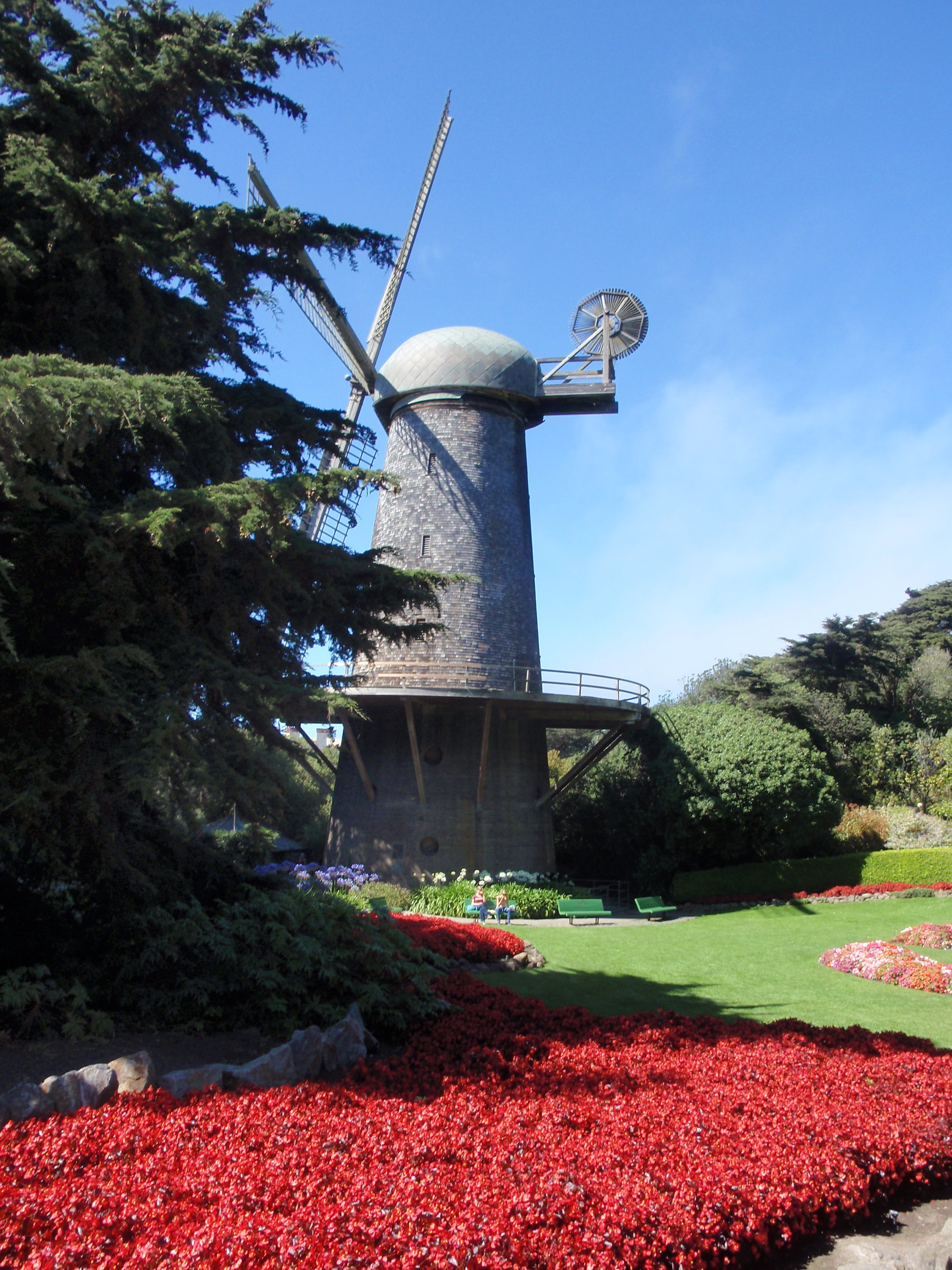
The windmill in 2012 with flower bed.

In 1964, the San Francisco Citizens Commission for the Restoration of the Golden Gate Park Windmills was formed and led by Eleanor Rossi Crabtree, daughter of former San Francisco mayor Angelo Rossi. The windmill was restored in 1981. The Queen Wilhelmina Tulip Garden is located next to the Dutch Mill.

== Events ==
In the Spring (February-April), colorful tulips are planted in the gardens in front and along the base of the Windmill.

== See also ==
- List of windmills in the United States
