= Stomatol Sign =

Animated commercial display sign in Stockholm, Sweden

Coordinates: 59.3190°N 18.0720°E

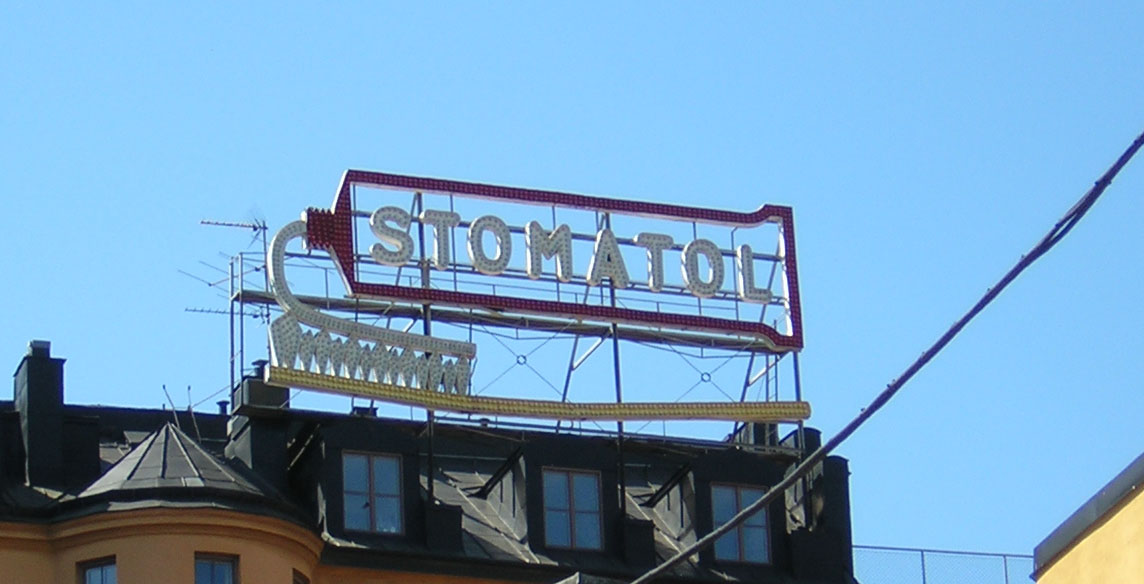
The animated Stomatol sign at Slussen, Stockholm, Sweden

The Stomatol Sign is Sweden's first animated commercial display and the oldest still working. It represents a toothbrush and a toothpaste tube of the Swedish brand Stomatol. It was first erected on November 22, 1909, on the old Katarina Elevator, in the area of Slussenområdet, Stockholm.
