= Mabel and Fatty Viewing the World's Fair at San Francisco =

1915 film

- First part of the film
- Directed by: Roscoe Arbuckle; Mabel Normand
- Produced by: Mack Sennett
- Starring: Roscoe Arbuckle; Mabel Normand
- Production company: Keystone Film Company
- Distributed by: Mutual Film Company
- Release date: April 22, 1915
- Running time: 16 minutes
- Country: United States
- Language: Silent with English intertitles

Mabel and Fatty Viewing the World's Fair at San Francisco is a 1915 American short comedy-documentary film both starring and directed by Roscoe Arbuckle and Mabel Normand.

== Cast ==
- Roscoe "Fatty" Arbuckle as himself
- Mabel Normand as herself
- Hank Mann
- James Rolph Jr., Mayor of San Francisco, as himself (credited as Mayor Rolph)
- Mme. Ernestine Schumann-Heink as herself (credited as Madame Schuman-Heink)
- Al St. John

== Production background ==
Producer Mack Sennett brought Arbuckle and Normand to the Panama–Pacific International Exposition, also known as the 1915 San Francisco World's Fair. They turned the cameras around, using the Fair crowds as extras and the Fair itself as a free background. Arbuckle and Normand clowned around and interacted with the Fair's surprised attendees. Among the sights shown are:

- The battleship Oregon (misidentified as a dreadnought) in the bay
- The Ferry Building
- The St. Francis Hotel (future site of the Fatty Arbuckle scandal)
- The convict ship Success (including views of a flogging frame and an iron maiden)
- The Tower of Jewels

The film ends with a nighttime view of the fair, including a scene with the "Captive Aeroplane", an early amusement ride.

Prints of the film exist in the Library of Congress film archive.

Mabel and Fatty Viewing the World's Fair at San Francisco (1915), Version 2

== See also ==
- Fatty Arbuckle filmography
- Fatty and Mabel at the San Diego Exposition (1915)
