= End of the Trail (Fraser) =

Statue by James Earle Fraser in Waupun, United States

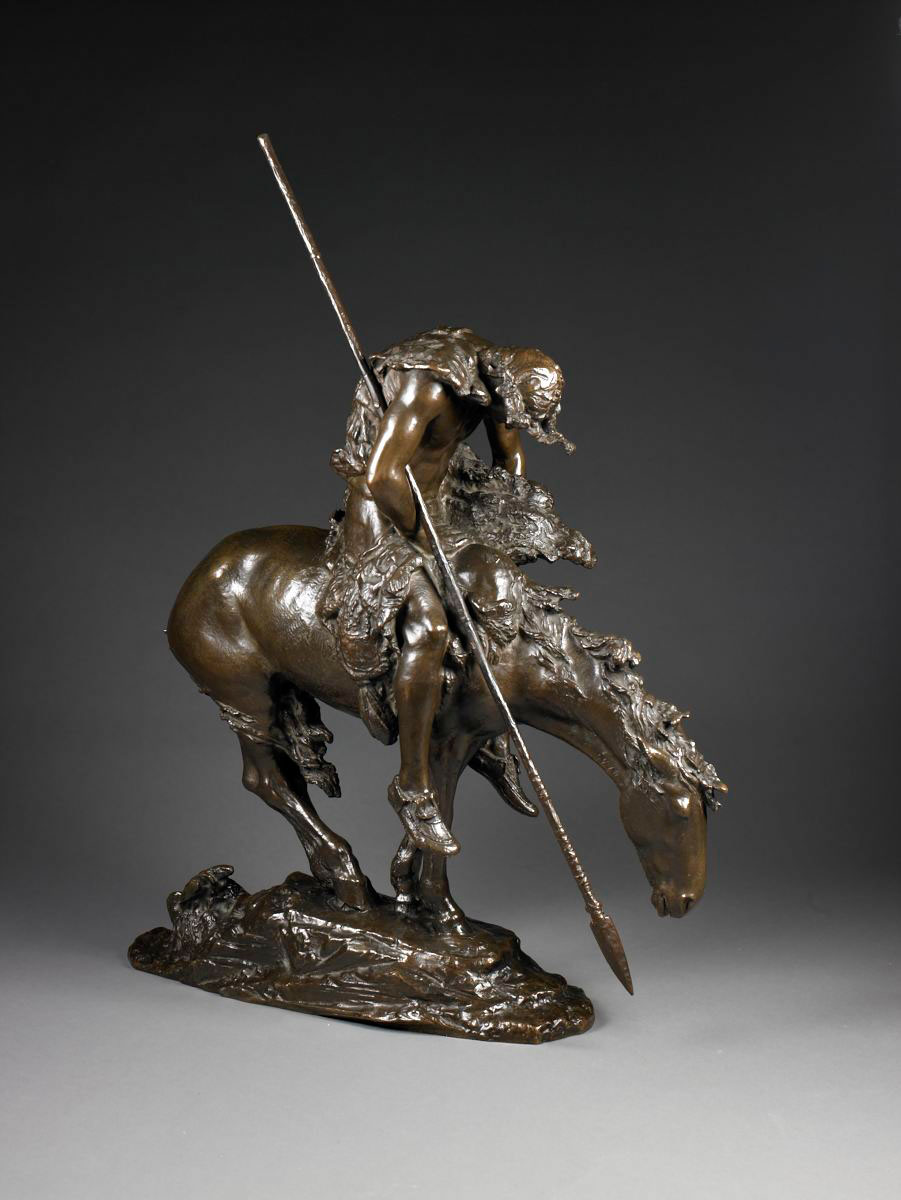
End of the Trail, 1918 cast

The End of the Trail is a sculpture by James Earle Fraser. Fraser created the original version of the work in 1894, and he subsequently produced numerous replicas in both plaster and bronze. The sculpture depicts a weary Native American man, wearing only the remains of a blanket and carrying a spear. He is hanging limp as his weary horse with swollen eyes stops to observe the ground before them. The wind blowing the horse's tail suggests they have their backs to the wind. The man in the statue may be based on Seneca Chief John Big Tree, and the horse was adapted from one in another work, In the Wind. The statue is a commentary on the damage white settlement inflicted upon Native Americans. The main figure embodies the suffering and exhaustion of people driven from their native lands.

Fraser felt a connection to Native American culture, which influenced the creation of the End of the Trail. The sculpture gained national popularity after being presented at the 1915 Panama–Pacific International Exposition. The 1915 version of the statue is now in the National Cowboy Hall of Fame and Western Heritage Museum. The work, which Fraser intended as a critique of the United States government, has been criticized for the manner in which it depicts Native Americans as a dying race. Fraser also stated that the work represented a "weaker race" being "pushed to the wall by a stronger (race)".

== Background ==
Fraser takes inspiration for End of the Trail from his experiences as a boy in the Dakota Territory. His memoirs state, "as a boy, I remembered an old Dakota trapper saying, 'The Indians will someday be pushed into the Pacific Ocean.'" Later he stated "the idea occurred to me of making an Indian which represented his race reaching the end of the trail, at the edge of the Pacific."

Fraser made several other works related to Native Americans. His design for the Buffalo-Indian Head nickel appeared on the five cent coin from 1913 to 1938. When asked to create something uniquely American, Fraser thought the buffalo and American Indian were integral parts of American culture and history. Another work by Fraser devoted to Native Americans is called The Buffalo Prayer.

== Design and construction ==
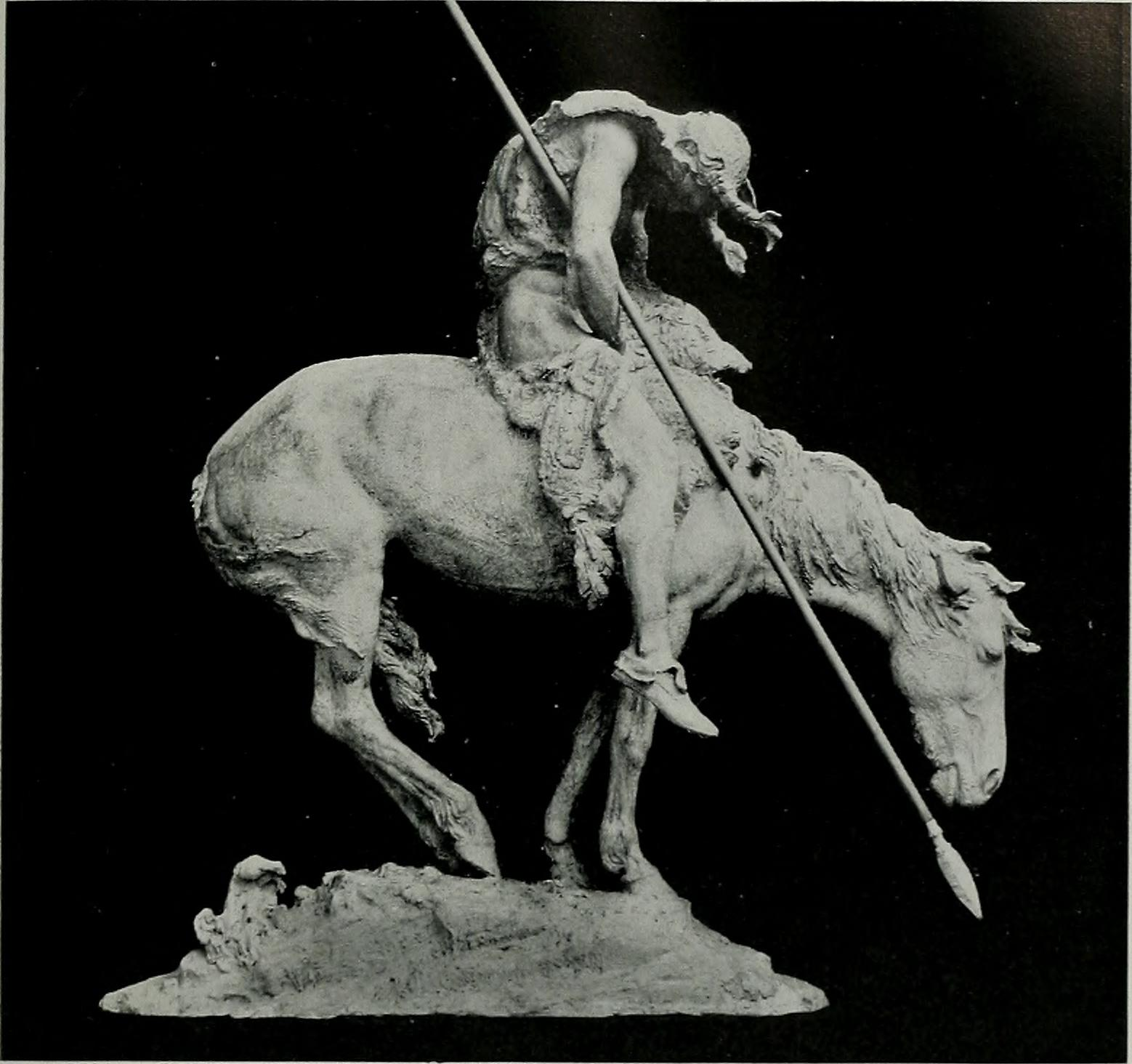
Plaster sculpture of End of the Trail exhibited at the Panama–Pacific International Exposition

Fraser created the first model of End of the Trail in 1894 at the age of 17. The design was inspired by a piece of art Fraser saw at the 1893 Columbian Exposition. The original model was exhibited at a competition sponsored by the American Art Association, winning first place. Over the years, Fraser created several renditions of the model, trying to perfect it. With the assistance of his wife, Laura Gardin Fraser, he created a two-and-a-half-times life-size model of the statue in plaster. This large plaster version of the work was displayed on an eight-foot pedestal at the 1915 Panama–Pacific International Exposition in San Francisco and was awarded the gold medal, garnering national attention.

== Location ==
After the Panama–Pacific Exposition closed, plans to place a bronze version of the statue on the Pacific Palisades were halted due to scarce resources during World War I. The plaster monument was thrown in a mud pit in Marina Park, along with other works from the Exposition. The Tulare County Forestry Board purchased and rescued the statue in 1919, transporting it to Mooney Grove Park in Visalia, California, where it was placed near other notable sculptures such as Pioneer by Solon Borglum. Fraser was unaware of the statue's location until 1922.

After Fraser's death in 1953, plans were in motion to create a Fraser Memorial Studio in the National Cowboy Hall of Fame and Western Heritage Museum in Oklahoma City, Oklahoma. The museum considered it imperative to feature Fraser's most renowned work, End of the Trail. Associates of the museum made an agreement with Tulare County that the 1915 plaster version could be transferred to the museum, which would supply a replica to Mooney Grove Park. Some residents of Visalia and art professionals felt that statue should remain where it had been for the past 50 years. The exchange was made, in part, because the statue was in poor condition with large surface cracks, and Tulare Country was unable to accumulate the funds to preserve it.

=== Restoration ===
As a result of being outdoors for decades, the 1915 plaster version had deteriorated significantly. The National Cowboy and Western Heritage Museum removed six layers of paint and closed fissures in the body of the horse. Enlarged photos of the Native American's head and other details of the artwork were created to ensure the statue was restored to its original appearance. According to artist Leonard McMurry, who was responsible for the restoration, facial features like the chin and the upper chest were most difficult to recreate. The surface of the statue was refined to allow for molds to be made. The restoration of End of the Trail was finished in 1971.

== Replicas ==
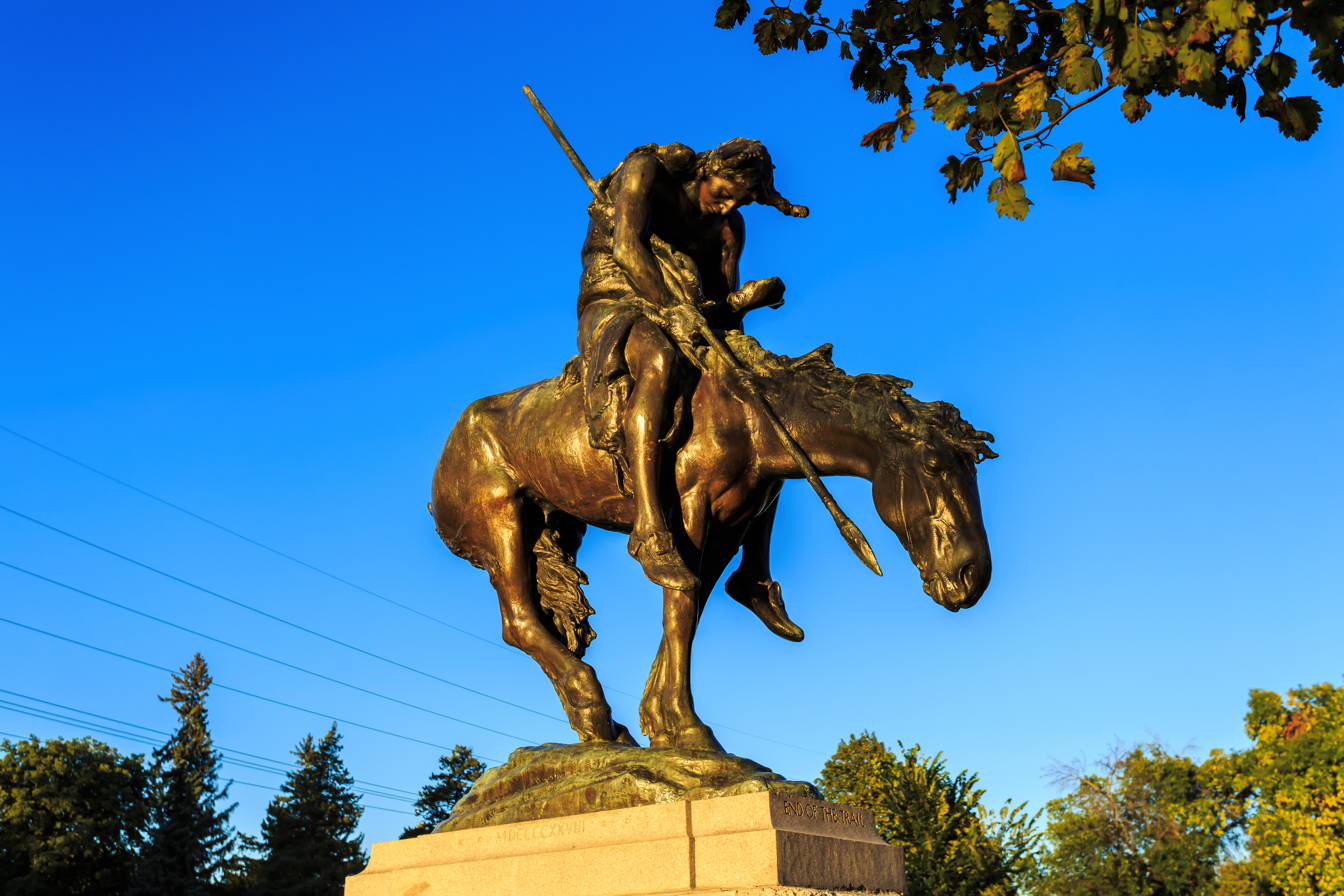
Bronze sculpture of End of the Trail, located in Shaler Park, Waupun, Wisconsin.

Within a few years of the Panama–Pacific International Exposition, Fraser capitalized on the notoriety of the sculpture by selling small-scale bronze replicas of the work, which he produced in two different sizes.

Fraser struggled, however, to find support for a large-scale bronze version of End of the Trail. Clarence A. Shaler, a wealthy art patron, had seen the monument at the Exposition and taken interest in it. He agreed to commission a bronze version in 1926. Fraser and Shaler compromised on reducing the scale of the statue to life size. The bronze was unveiled on June 23, 1929 and donated to Waupun, Wisconsin as a tribute to Native Americans. Fraser said it was "fitting that in Wisconsin, where the Indian made one of his last stands...I could offer this slight tribute to his memory." The Waupun statue was added to the National Register of Historic Places in 1980.

The National Cowboy Hall of Fame and Western Heritage Museum used molds from the plaster statue to create a bronze version to give to the city of Visalia. This version of the statue was funded by the museum. The cast bronze replica was placed on a pedestal in Mooney Grove Park in 1971.

=== A national symbol ===
Reproductions of the work have turned it into a recognizable symbol across America. Following the Exposition in San Francisco, images of the statue appeared in prints, miniatures, and postcards. The pose itself became widely imitated at traveling shows and rodeos. A painting of the statue appeared on the original cover of the 1971 album Surf's Up by the Beach Boys. Many copies of the 1915 statue are on display elsewhere, including one at the Metropolitan Museum of Art in New York City, another in the library at Winona State University in Fraser's hometown of Winona, Minnesota, and a 1929 version at the Riverside Cemetery in Oshkosh, Wisconsin.

== Interpretation and criticism ==
The Panama-Pacific International Exposition catalog said the End of the Trail was "a reminiscence of early American history and its traditions of courage and endurance, and the pathos of the Indian's decline."

The art historian Carol Clark said that the work has been interpreted from multiple perspectives. Some have seen it as a statement that Native Americans were destined to die out to allow for American expansion, while others have seen it as an indictment of settler and government actions that destroyed dozens of autonomous Indigenous nations.

Jeffrey Gibson, an Indigenous sculptor, told art historian Shannon Vittoria, "I saw [End of the Trail] as an image of a shamed, defeated Indian. It always made me feel badly about myself, and I wondered if this was really how the rest of the world viewed us: as failures. It seemed to be an image about defeat and despair."
