= Panama–Pacific International Exposition =

1915 world's fair in San Francisco, California, US

1915 San Francisco
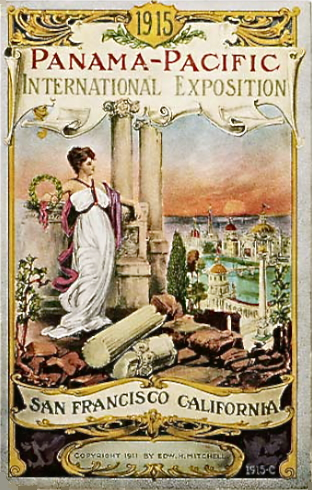
- Poster for the exhibition

Overview
- BIE-class: Universal exposition
- Category: Historical Expo
- Name: Panama-Pacific International Exposition
- Area: 636 acres (257 ha)
- Visitors: 18,876,438
- Organized by: Charles C. Moore

Participant(s)
- Countries: 24

Location
- Country: United States
- City: San Francisco
- Venue: Marina District
- Coordinates: 37°48′16.8″N 122°26′48″W

Timeline
- Opening: February 20, 1915; 111 years ago
- Closure: December 4, 1915

Universal expositions
- Previous: Exposition universelle et internationale (1913) in Ghent
- Next: Independence Centenary International Exposition in Rio de Janeiro

Simultaneous
- Other: Panama–California Exposition

The Panama–Pacific International Exposition was a world's fair held in San Francisco, California, United States, from February 20 to December 4, 1915. Its stated purpose was to celebrate the completion of the Panama Canal, but it was widely seen in the city as an opportunity to showcase its recovery from the 1906 earthquake. The fair was constructed on a 636-acre (257-hectare) site along the northern shore, between the Presidio and Fort Mason, now known as the Marina District.

== Planning ==
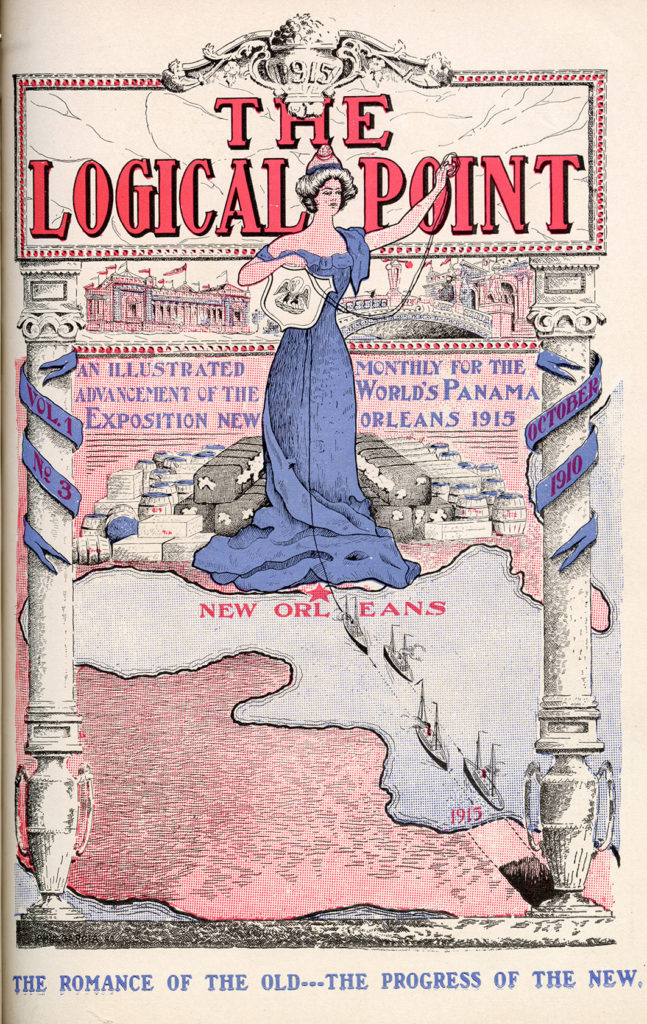
Promotional material from New Orleans's unsuccessful bid to hold the exposition

Discussion of holding a World's Fair to celebrate the opening of the Panama Canal began in 1904. San Francisco, New Orleans, and San Diego, California, promoted bids to be the site. Despite San Francisco ultimately getting the most support, San Diego went ahead with its own Panama–California Exposition.

== Exhibits and themes ==
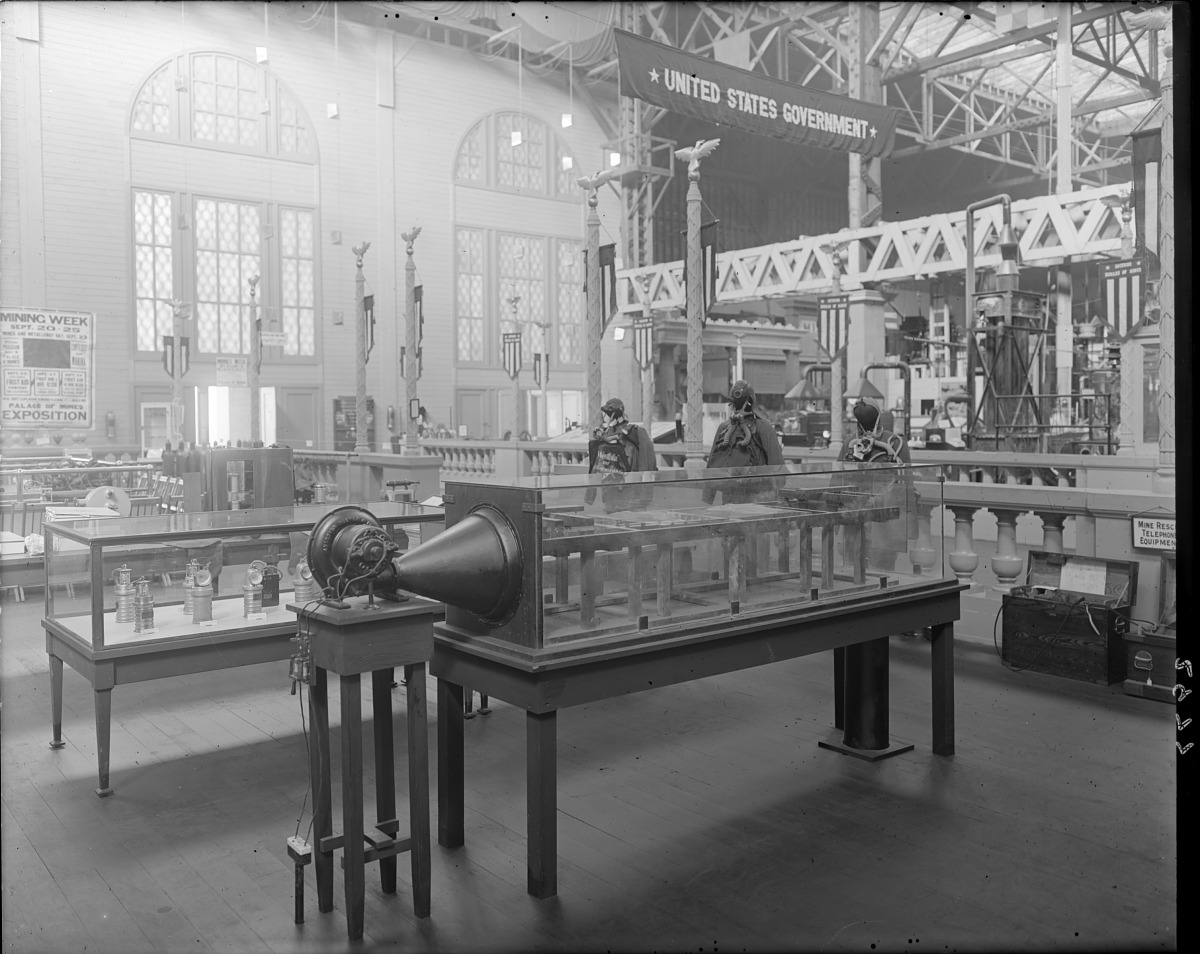
An exhibit by the Department of the Interior's Bureau of Mines.

Among the exhibits at the exposition was the C. P. Huntington, the first steam locomotive purchased by Southern Pacific Railroad; the locomotive is now on static display at the California State Railroad Museum in Sacramento. A telephone line was also established to New York City so people across the continent could hear the Pacific Ocean. The Liberty Bell traveled by train on a nationwide tour from Philadelphia, Pennsylvania, to attend the exposition.

The 1915 American Grand Prize and Vanderbilt Cup auto races were held February 27 and March 6 on a 3.84-mile (6.18 km) circuit set up around the Exposition grounds. The Smithsonian Institution also had an exhibition at the Exposition.

=== Native American representation ===
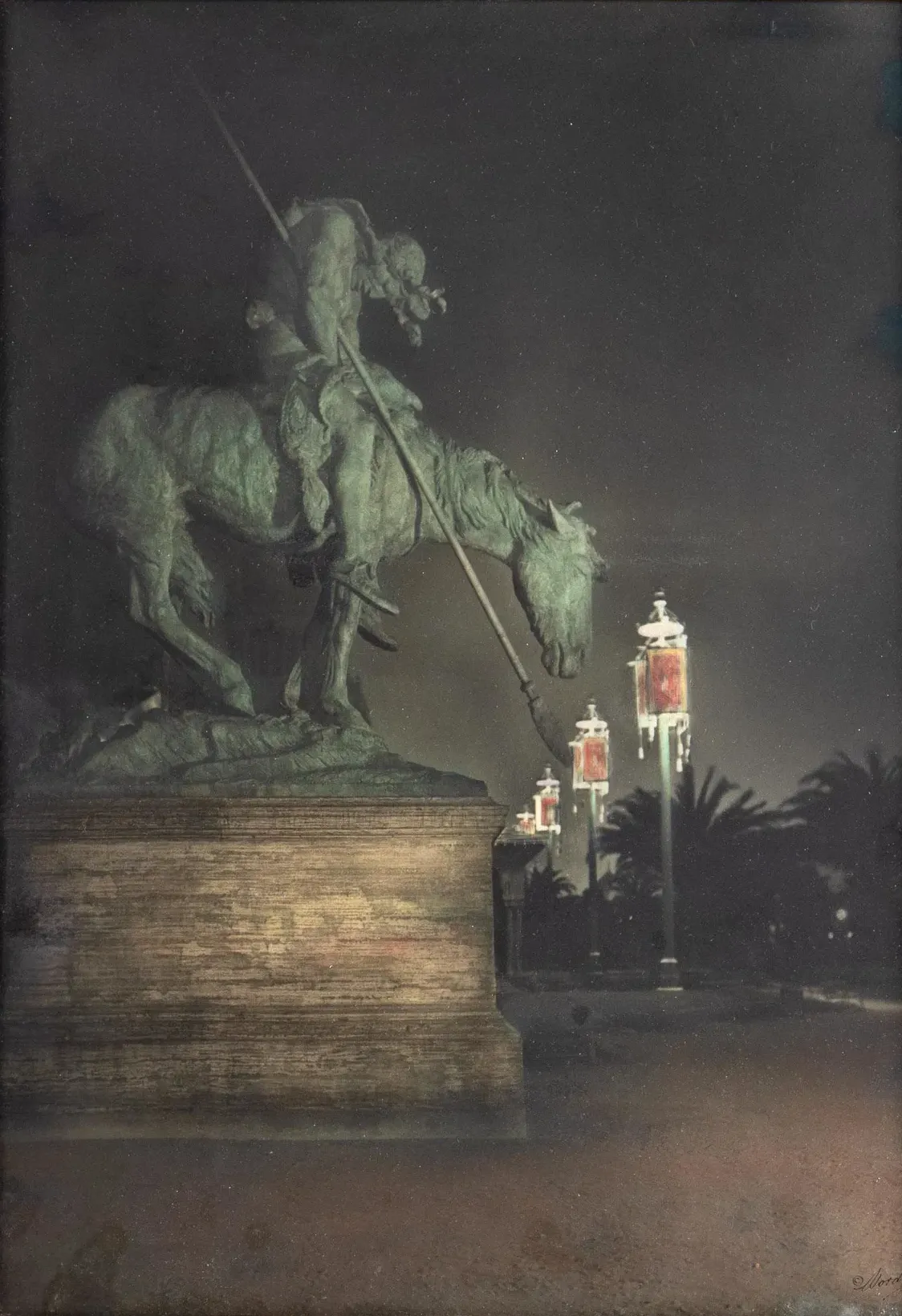
Willard Worden, Fraser's The End of the Trail by night at the PPIE.

Native American culture was a topic of interest during the nine-month long exposition with multiple attractions dedicated to Native American life. The most popular attraction at the exposition that depicted Native American life is James Earle Fraser's statue The End of the Trail. Fraser's statue, which showed a Native American man slumped over on a horse, reflected the American idea at the time, that the Native American race was doomed for extinction. The exposition not only celebrated the completion of the Panama Canal, but also advances made by the American people, part of which were the conquests of indigenous people by Americans as well as Europeans. These celebrations over the Native community, can be seen through artworks such as The End of the Trail and The Pioneer or tributes to Francisco Pizarro and Hernán Cortés. In comparison to previous world fairs, the Panama–Pacific International Exposition showcased Native Americans more as nobles rather than savage people, but who were still inevitably destined to become extinct. These ideas were presented in plays, known as pageants, where Native Americans played small roles such as in "Catalonian dragoons, muleteers, and a tribe of Carmel Indians." While the demise of Native American people was a rhetoric created by fair organizers, scholars have argued that in reality, the Native persona was very present and did not reflect the idea that it was a disappearing civilization. Native Americans were in fact part of the fair, but also attended as visitors, performers, and workers. More recently, scholars have focused on Native representation in San Francisco's 1915 rival world fair, San Diego's 1915 Panama–California Exposition, that showed Native American life in a more anthropological light versus this American ideal.

=== Women and gender roles ===
During the Panama–Pacific International Exposition, women were in charge of their own board, known as the Woman's Board of San Francisco's Panama–Pacific International Exposition. Phoebe A. Hearst served as the board's Honorary President, Mrs. F. G. Sanborn as President, and Mrs. Gaillard Stoney as Secretary. The board, also called the Board of Lady Managers, allowed women to take part in organizing different aspects of the fair and more importantly gave them the opportunity to have a campaigning platform for discussing women's rights and social issues. It was commonly argued that the fair celebrated male dominance over women by not providing a building for women. Also, men and women were depicted differently in artworks advertising the exposition. White women, specifically, were presented as caretakers while men as strong and powerful saviors, such as in the poster "13th Labor of Hercules."

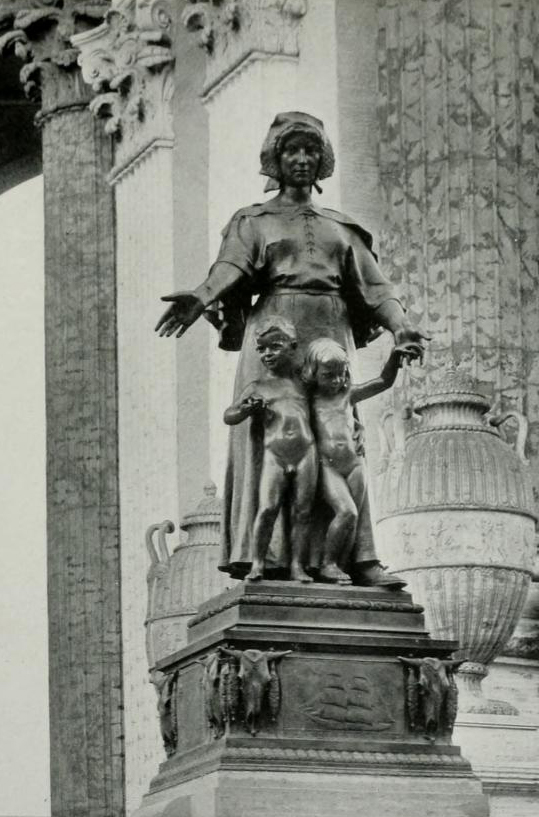
Pioneer Mother (Charles Grafly)

At the time, there was an idea of a "New Woman" who was more progressive and advanced intellectually and sexually. This idea of a "New Woman" related to the overarching themes of the fair: modernity, and progress. In efforts to promote the fair, organizers used the "New Woman" as an advertising tactic and proof that San Francisco was an evolving and safe environment for tourists. During the fair, women could be seen posing with agriculture from around the state in celebration of California's produce. All the women were young, beautiful white women who were often the highlight of newspaper articles and events. This use of women presented the idea that they were useful only for their beauty but failed to appreciate their intellectual capacity and physical abilities.

The International Conference of Women Workers to Promote Permanent Peace was held on July 4–7 in the "Peace Palace", a transformation of the Civic Auditorium (now the Bill Graham Civic Auditorium). May Wright Sewall, by appointment of Charles C. Moore, chair of the exposition, organized the peace conference. It was attended by women pacificists from all over the world, especially the neutral countries of World War I.

One of the most memorable achievements of the Women's Board was the installation of statues that celebrated women, specifically mothers, known as the Pioneer Mother.

The National Society Colonial Dames XVII Century was established by six women while attending the exposition.

=== China's Participation ===
The Republic of China participated extensively in the Panama–Pacific International Exposition. After the Panama Canal project progressed, U.S. invitations were extended worldwide including China. Initially Chinese planning was slow, but as the United States became the first major power in the West to recognize the Republic of China government in 1913, the Chinese government formally formed a bureau to prepare for the fair with a mission to represent the nascent republic.

Chinese organizers assembled more than 100,000 products from 19 provinces, which reportedly comprised over half the total number of exhibits displayed by participating nations. China's products included industrial goods, textiles, ceramics, tea, and more, which in total earned over 1,200 medals and awards, the highest number won by any participating country at the fair. Chinese efforts were overseen by a delegation led by Chen Qi (陈琪), who coordinated the preparation, shipment, and exhibition of the Chinese entries.

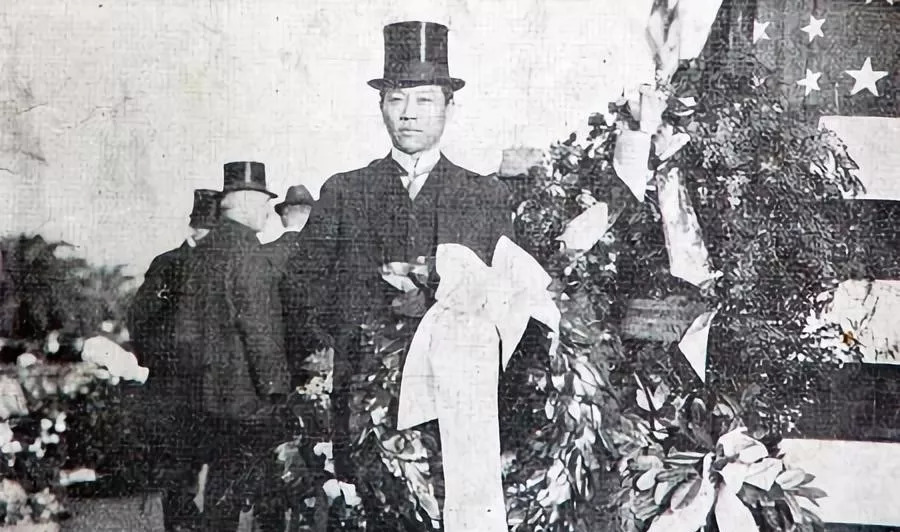
Chen Qi (at times translated as Ch'en Ch'i in Wade–Giles), head of the Chinese delegation at the Exposition.

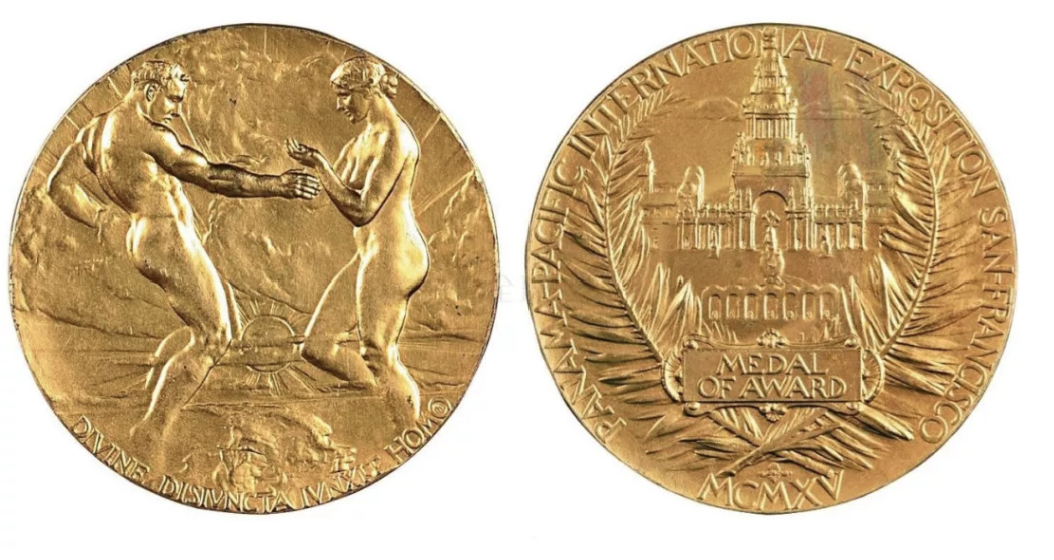
The Golden Medal of Award won by Fenjiu (汾酒), a traditional Baijiu from Shanxi province (Collection of Fenjiu Museum)

== Architecture ==
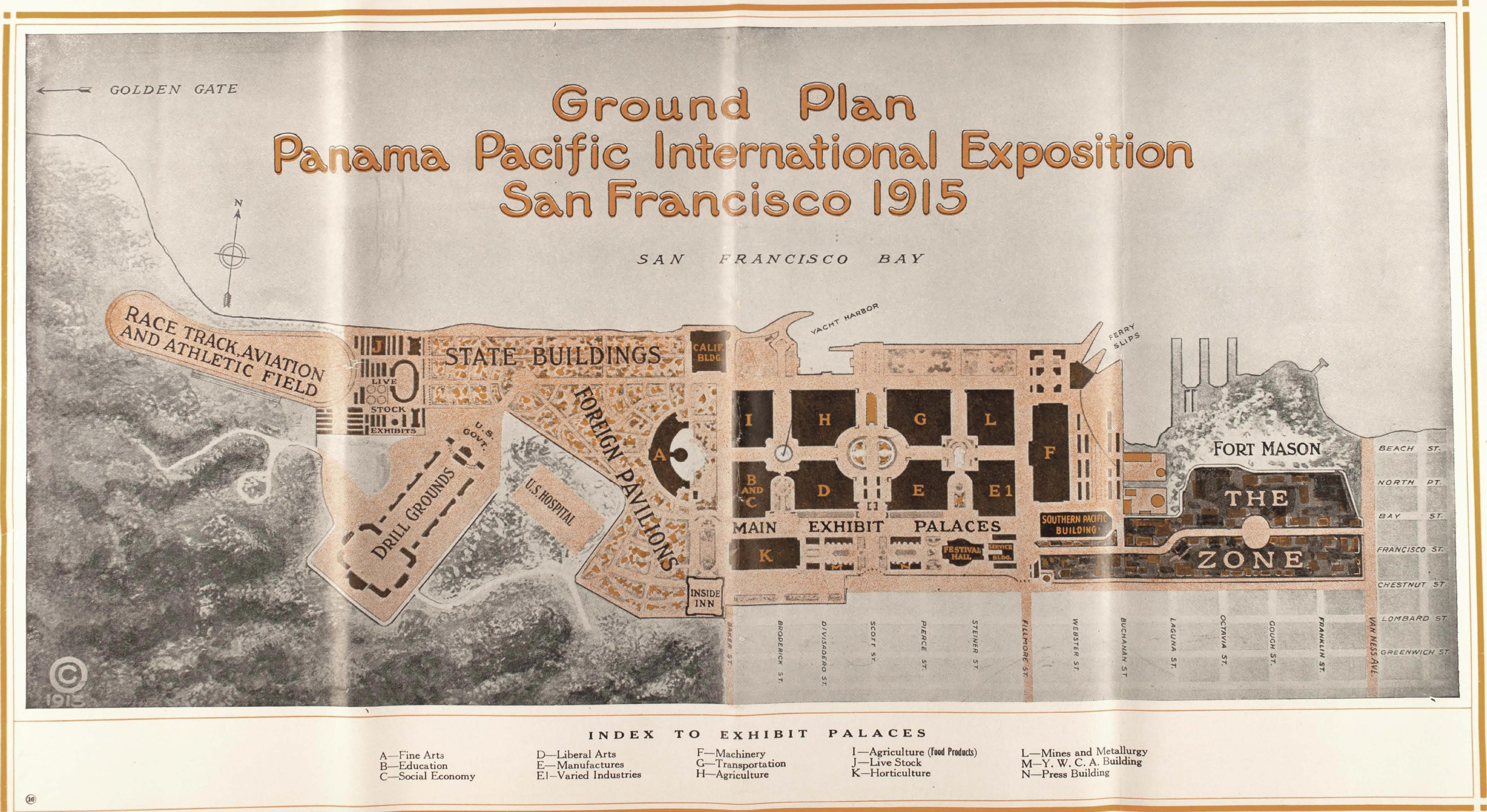
Map of Exposition A Fine Arts B Education C Social Economy D Liberal Arts E Manufacturers E1 Varied Industries F Machinery G Transportation H Agriculture I Agriculture (Food Products) J Live Stock K Horticulture L Mines and Metallurgy

The centerpiece was the Tower of Jewels, which rose to 435 feet (133 m). The Tower was covered with over 102,000 3/4-to-2-inch (19 to 51 mm) suspended, mirror-backed Austrian cut glass prisms, branded as "Novagem", some colored and some clear, which refracted sunlight by day and reflected 54 searchlight beams by night. Two buildings were lit from within at night, one of them an "Electric Kaleidoscope" created by a circle of 12 moving floodlight beams aimed upwards at the glass dome of the Palace of Horticulture.

Walter D'Arcy Ryan was the lighting designer, marking the first widespread use of floodlighting at a fair, and also the first use of high-pressure gas mantle lamps and of high-wattage tungsten filament lamps.

South of the Tower, the Fountain of Energy flowed at the center of the South Gardens, flanked by the Palace of Horticulture on the west and the Festival Hall to the east. The arch of the Tower served as the gateway to the Court of the Universe, leading to the Court of the Four Seasons to the west and the Court of Abundance to the east. These courts formed the primary exhibit area for the fair, which included the Palaces of Food Products, Agriculture, Liberal Arts, and Education and Social Economy and surrounding the Court of the Four Seasons; and the Palaces of Transportation, Mines and Metallurgy, Varied Industries, and Manufacturers surrounding the Court of Abundance.

The central court group was bookended on the east by the Palace of Machinery, the largest of all the halls built for the Exhibition, and on the west by the Palace of Fine Arts, which survives onsite.

Further west into the Presidio, down The Avenue of the Nations, were national and states' buildings, displaying customs and products unique to the area represented. The far western end of the Fair, past the states' pavilions, was reserved for live stock exhibits. At the opposite end of the Fair, near Fort Mason was "The Zone", an avenue of popular amusements and concessions stands.

=== Construction ===
The Division of Works, with Harris D. H. Connick as its Director and Arthur H. Markwart as its Assistant Director, was responsible for overseeing the construction of the exposition buildings and infrastructure. Markwart also served as Chief of Construction. The Division of Works was made up of seven departments: Civil Engineering, Construction, Electrical and Mechanical Engineering, Architecture, Sculptures, Color and Decorations, and Landscape Engineering. The Department of Construction consisted of (1) the Bureau of Structural Engineering, headed by Chief Structural Engineer Henry D. Dewell, (2) the Bureau of Building Construction, under the leadership of William Waters, (3) The Bureau of Specifications, headed by C. H. Alden, (4) the Bureau of Estimates, headed by C. H. Munson, and (5) the Bureau of Memorandum Accounts, headed by A. C. Emery. At one point the Division of Works consisted of 336 employees.

Constructed from temporary materials (primarily staff, a combination of plaster and burlap fiber), almost all the fair's various buildings and attractions were pulled down in late 1915. Intended to fall into pieces at the close of the fair (reportedly because the architect believed every great city needed ruins), the only presently-surviving building on the Exposition grounds, Bernard Maybeck's Palace of Fine Arts, remained in place, slowly falling into disrepair. The hall, used to display painting and sculpture during the Fair, was repurposed as a garage for jeeps during World War II. The Palace, including the colonnade with its signature weeping women and rotunda dome, was completely reconstructed in the 1960s and a seismic retrofit was completed in early 2009. The Exploratorium, an interactive science museum, occupied the northern 2/3 of the Palace from 1969 to 2013; the city-owned Palace of Fine Arts Theater, has occupied the southern 1/3 since 1970.

Several other buildings were saved immediately following the Exposition, including the California, Missouri, and Philippine buildings, which were built on government land.

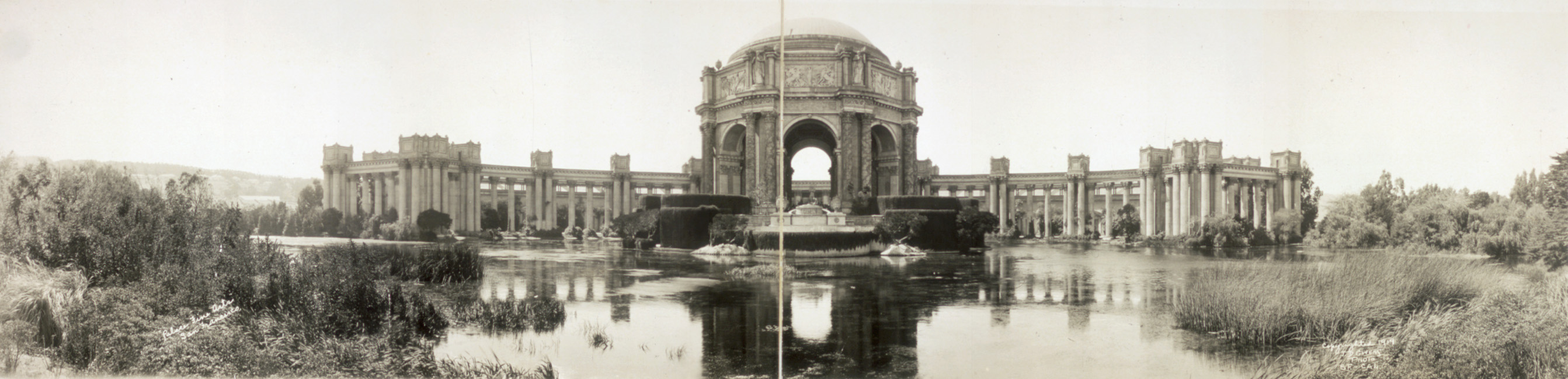
A panorama of the Palace of Fine Arts c. 1919. The current building was rebuilt in the 1960s, and then seismically retrofitted after damage from 1989's Loma Prieta earthquake, and again in 2009.

=== Other surviving buildings ===
Buildings from the Exposition that still stand today (other than the Palace of Fine Arts) include what is now called the Bill Graham Civic Auditorium at Civic Center Plaza and the Japanese Tea house, which was barged down the Bay to Belmont, California, and operated successively as a private residence, speakeasy, and restaurant.

Also surviving are the one-third scale steam locomotives of the Overfair Railroad that operated at the Exposition. They had been maintained in working order at the Swanton Pacific Railroad Society located on Cal Poly San Luis Obispo's Swanton Ranch just north of Santa Cruz. But a forest fire swept through the area in 2020, severely damaging the railroad.

The Legion of Honor Museum, in Lincoln Park, was the gift of Alma de Bretteville Spreckels, wife of the sugar magnate and thoroughbred racehorse owner/breeder Adolph B. Spreckels. The building is a full-scale replica of the French Pavilion from the 1915 Panama–Pacific International Exposition, which in turn was a three-quarter-scale version of the Palais de la Légion d'Honneur also known as the Hôtel de Salm in Paris by George Applegarth and H. Guillaume. At the close of the exposition, the French government granted Spreckels permission to construct a permanent replica of the French Pavilion, but World War I delayed the groundbreaking until 1921.

The warehouse for the exposition was moved to Fort Hunter Liggett in South Monterey County and the structure, nicknamed the "Tin Barn", has served as the base fire department for the last 30 years. After its move, it initially served as a horse barn, and since then, it has served as a gym, PX and a movie theater for the base.

== Commemorations and legacy ==
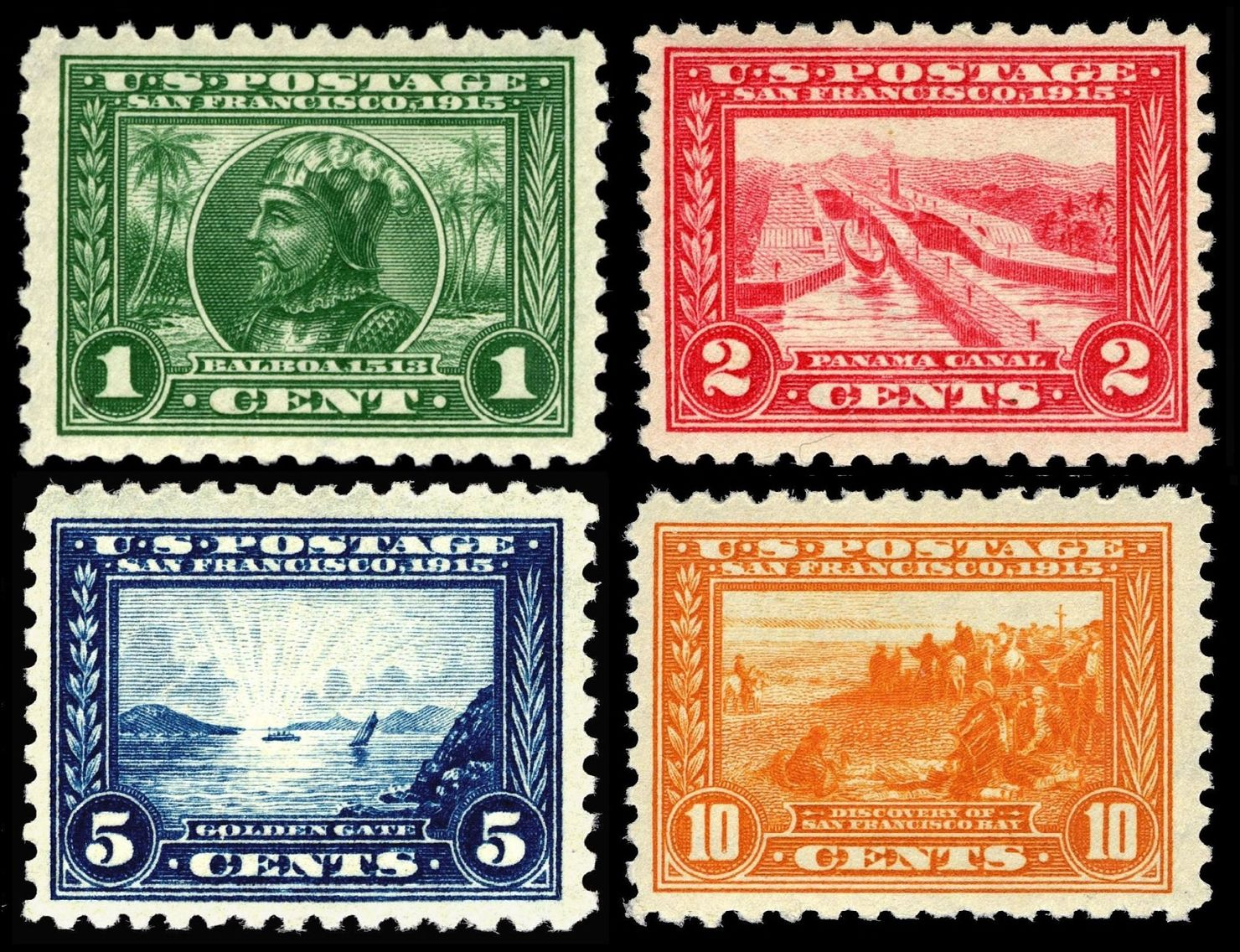
Panama-Pacific Issues of 1913/1915

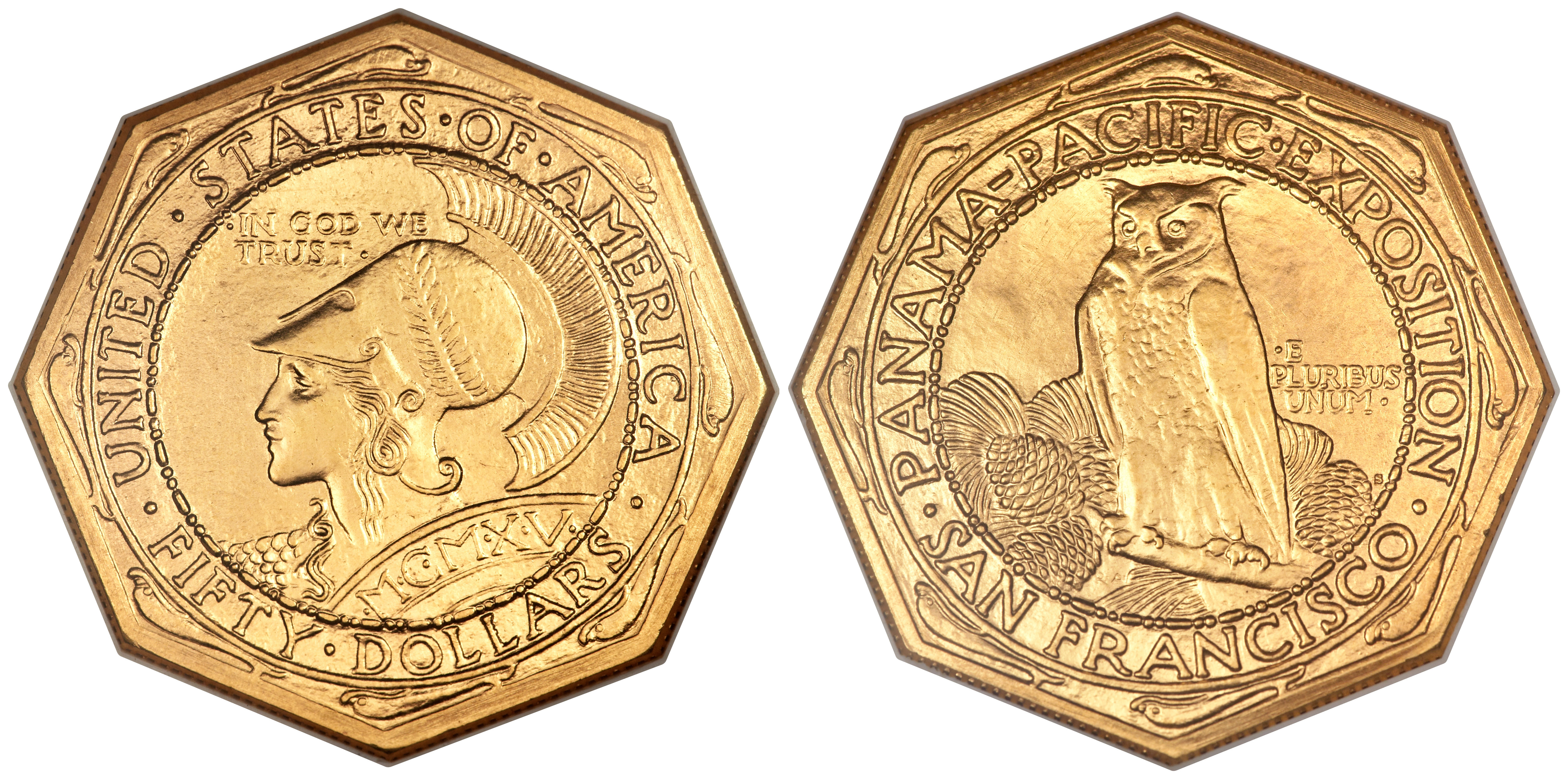
$50 octagonal gold commemorative coin by Robert Aitken

The US Post Office issued a set of four postage stamps to commemorate the exposition, with designs depicting a profile of Vasco Núñez de Balboa (1¢), the Pedro Miguel Locks of the Panama Canal (2¢), the Golden Gate (5¢), and the discovery of San Francisco Bay (10¢). The stamps were first put on sale in 1913, to promote the coming event, and perforated 12, and then reissued in 1914 and 1915, perforated 10. Their prices today range widely; the 2¢ of 1913 is available for under a dollar in used condition, while an unused 10¢ of the scarcer orange-yellow variety in 1915 can be worth up to a thousand United States dollars.

The United States Congress authorized the San Francisco Mint (also known as "The Granite Lady") to issue a series of five commemorative coins. Said coins were the 1915-S silver Panama-Pacific half dollar and four gold coins. The denominations of the gold coins were $$1, 2 1/2 (quarter eagle) and $50 (in two types: a round coin, and an unusual octagonal coin). The Panama-Pacific coins have the distinction of being the first commemorative coins to bear the motto "In God We Trust", and were also the first commemoratives to be struck at a branch mint.

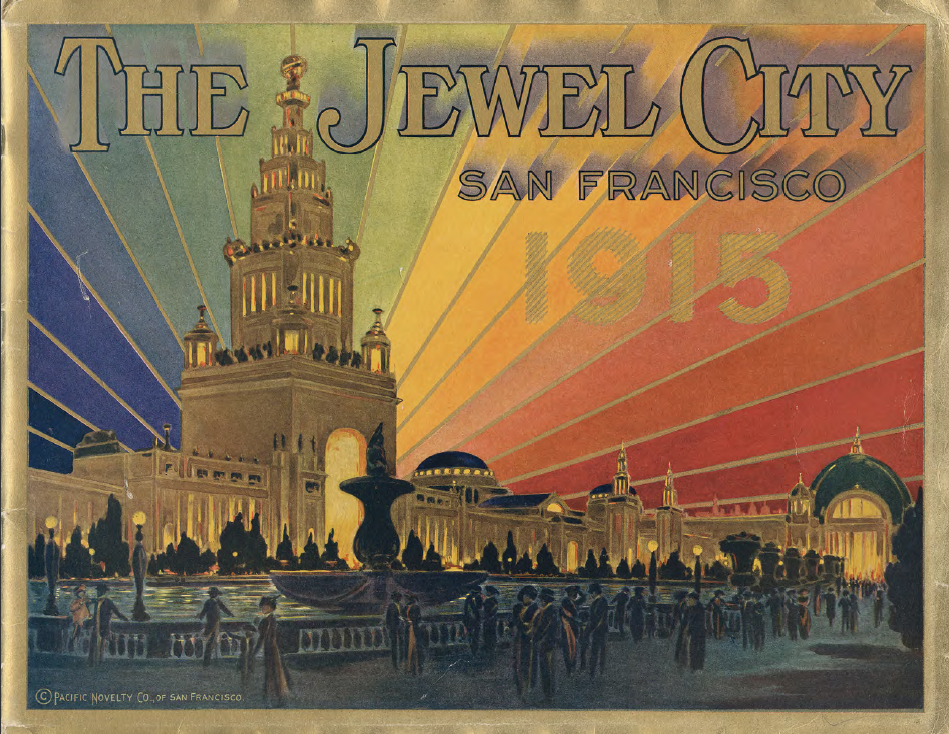
Souvenir booklet, The Jewel City 1915

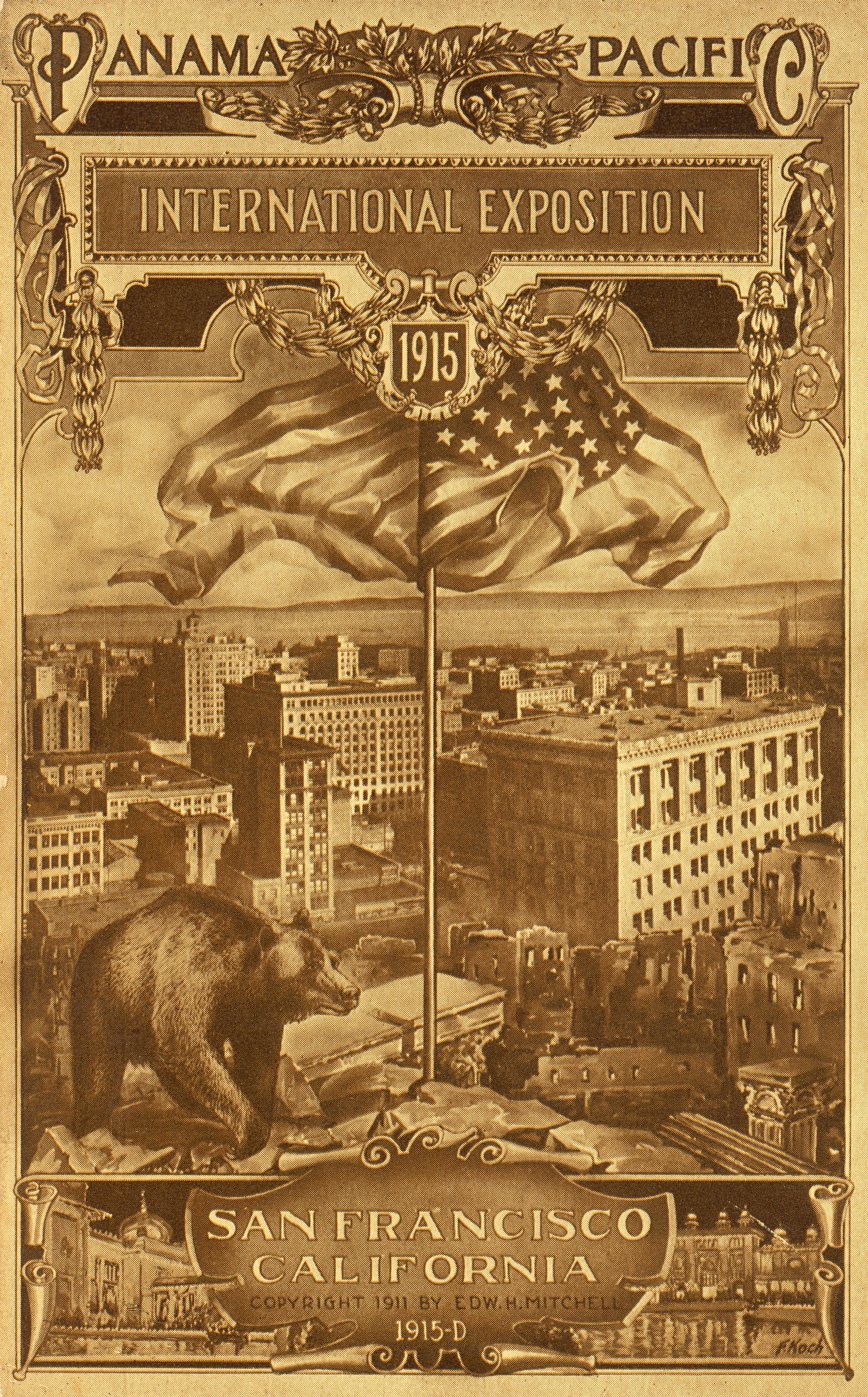
Souvenir postcard

Numismatist Farran Zerbe supervised the creation of a series of commemorative medals, an award medal, a souvenir medal, and diplomas.

=== Centennial ===
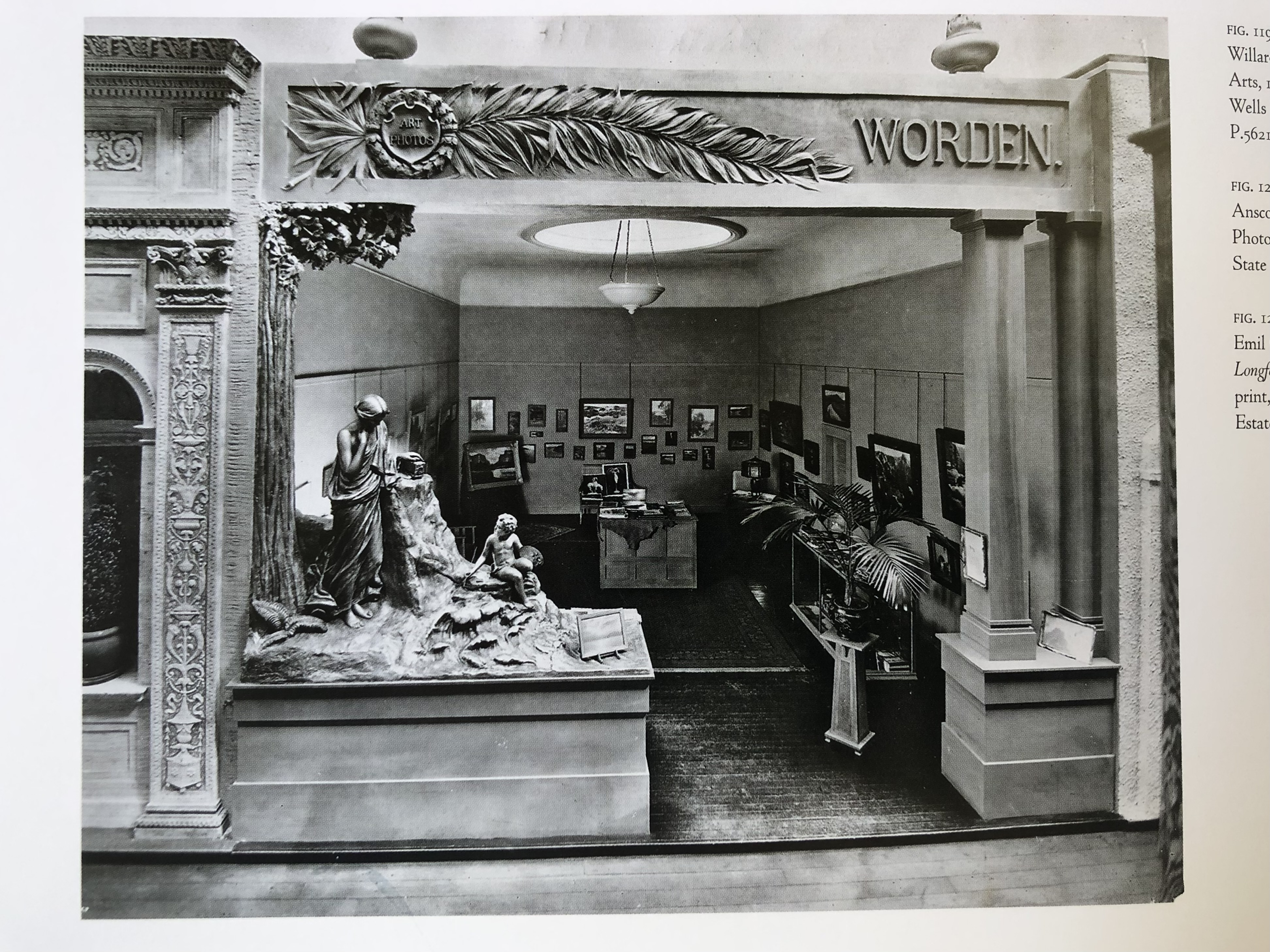
Photo by Willard Worden of his Art Photos exhibit at the PPIE.

In 2015, the California Historical Society, the Maybeck Foundation, and Innovation Hangar partnered with the City and County of San Francisco to commemorate the centennial of the transformative 1915 Panama Pacific International Exposition.

On June 20, 2015, a commemorative orchestra, chorus and band concert was held at the Palace of Fine Arts to celebrate the 100th anniversary of the fair.

A feature film, When the World Came to San Francisco, which tells the story of the fair, was made by writer and director R. Christian Anderson. It was part of the city's official centennial celebration sanctioned by the California Historical Society. The film had its world premiere at the de Young Museum in Golden Gate Park on October 30, 2015.

A large exhibition marking the centennial of the PPIE opened at the de Young Museum in 2015, along with a concurrent exhibition of the photographs of Willard Worden, who had an exhibit of his Art Photos at the PPIE and, as an official photographer, took many photos of the fair by day and by night.

== Gallery ==
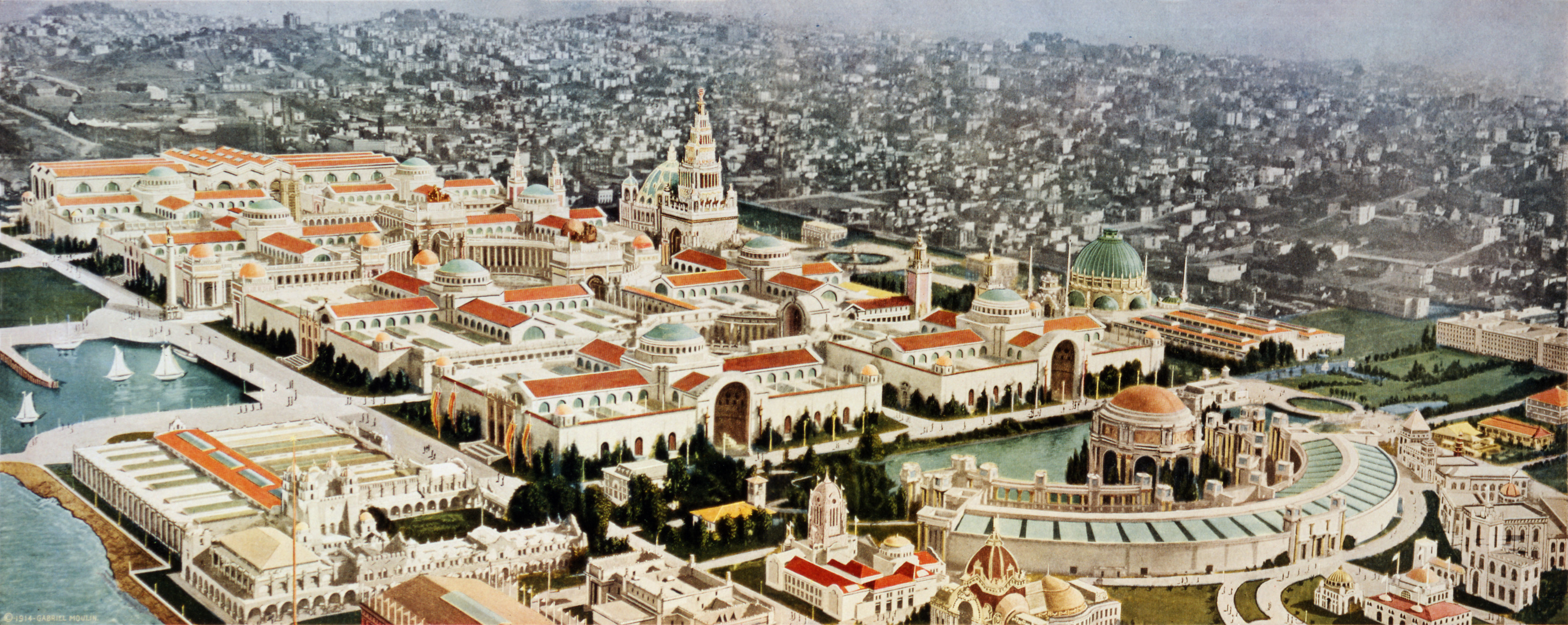
Aerial view of the Panama–Pacific International Exposition, directed southeast. The exposition buildings have been colored to distinguish them; the area, then known as Harbor View, is now the Marina District.

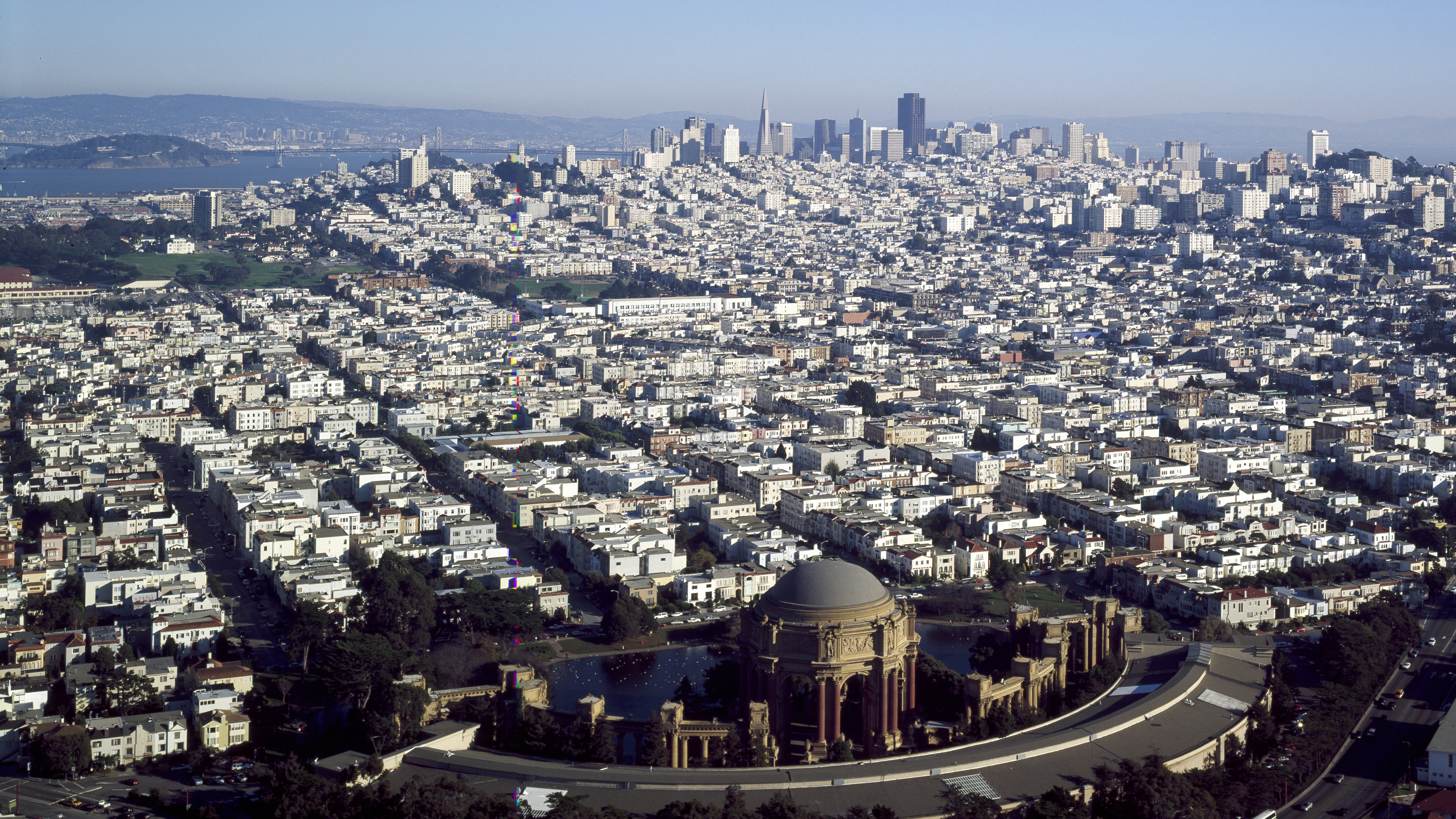
Modern view of PPIE grounds, directed east-southeast in 1980; cropped from a photograph by Carol Highsmith. The Palace of Fine Arts is prominent in the foreground.

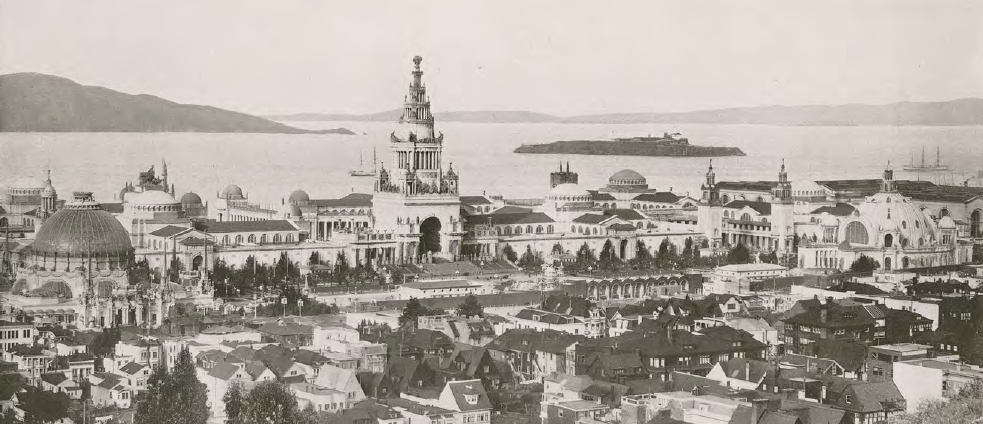
View north-northeast; the Tower of Jewels is prominent in the center, and the domed Palace of Horticulture can be seen on the left. Alcatraz Island can be seen in the background.
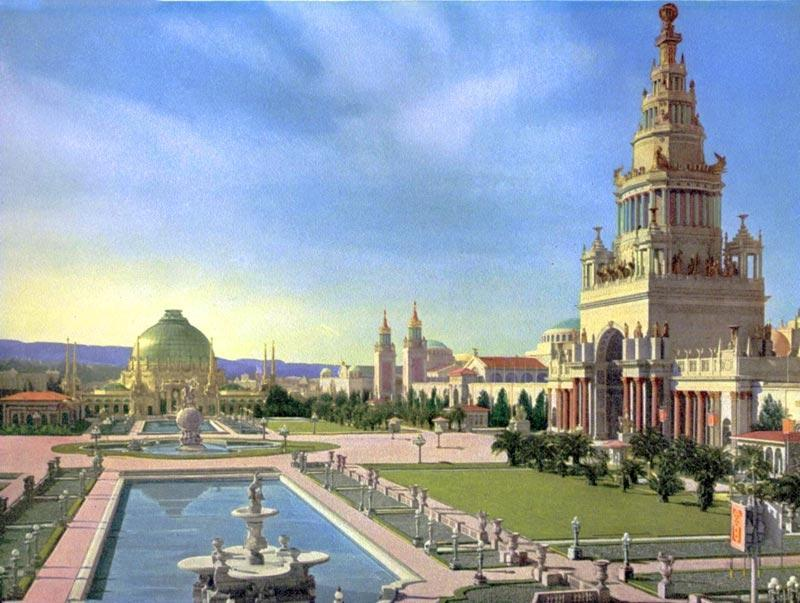
General view of the South Gardens directed west, with the Palace of Horticulture (left) and Tower of Jewels (right)

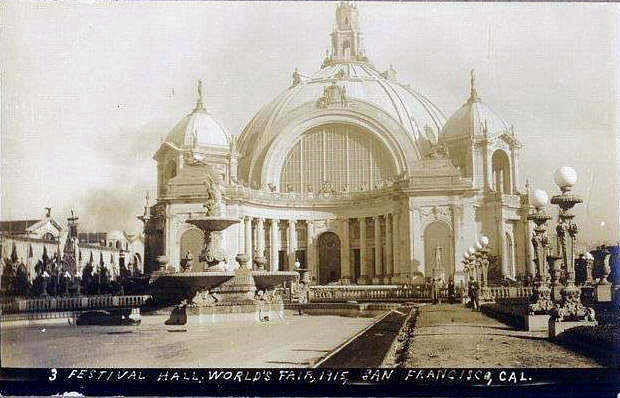
Festival Hall

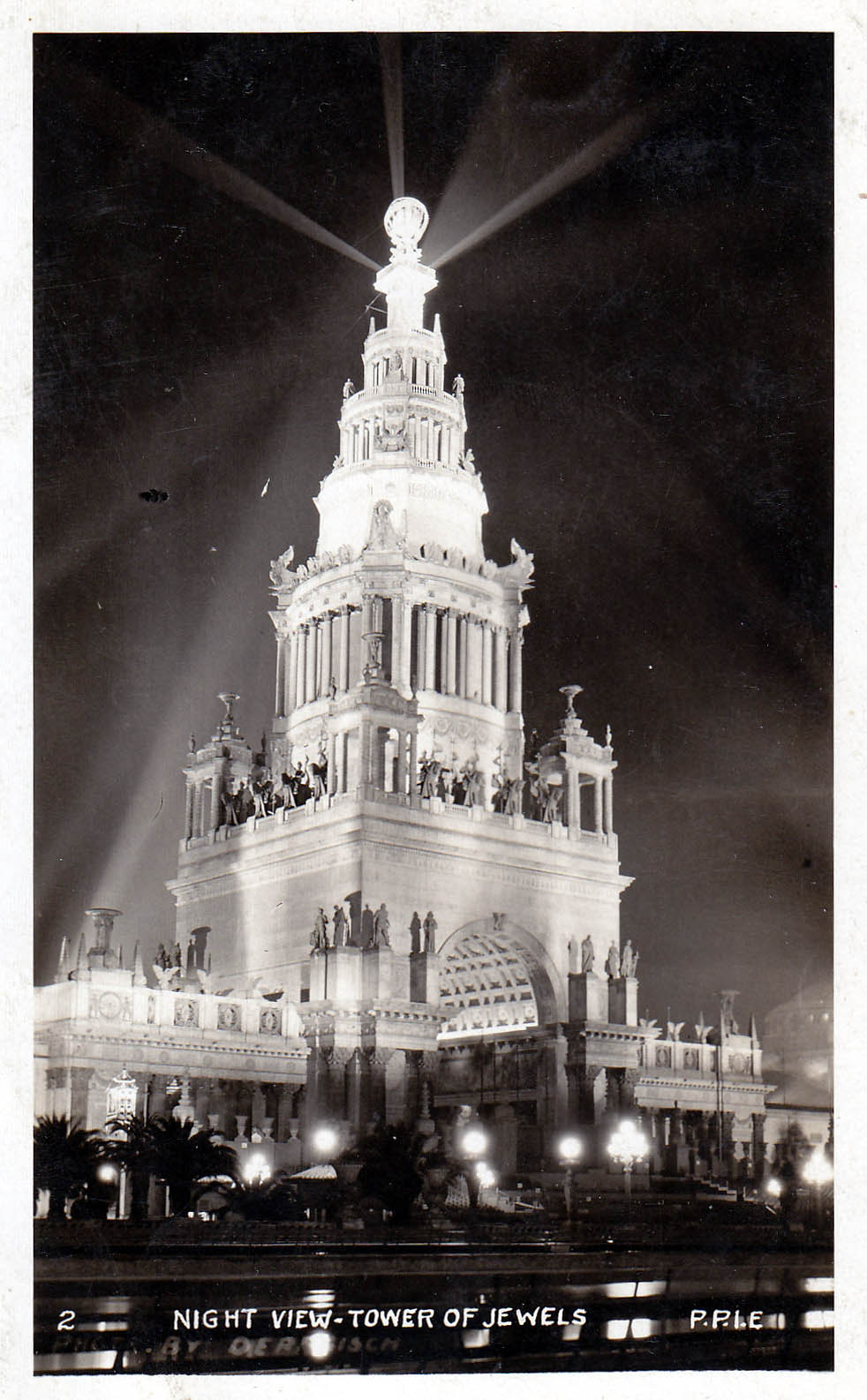
Tower of Jewels at night

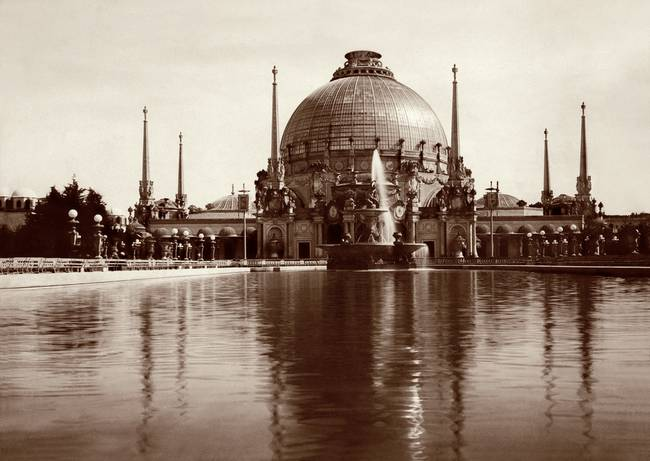
Palace of Horticulture

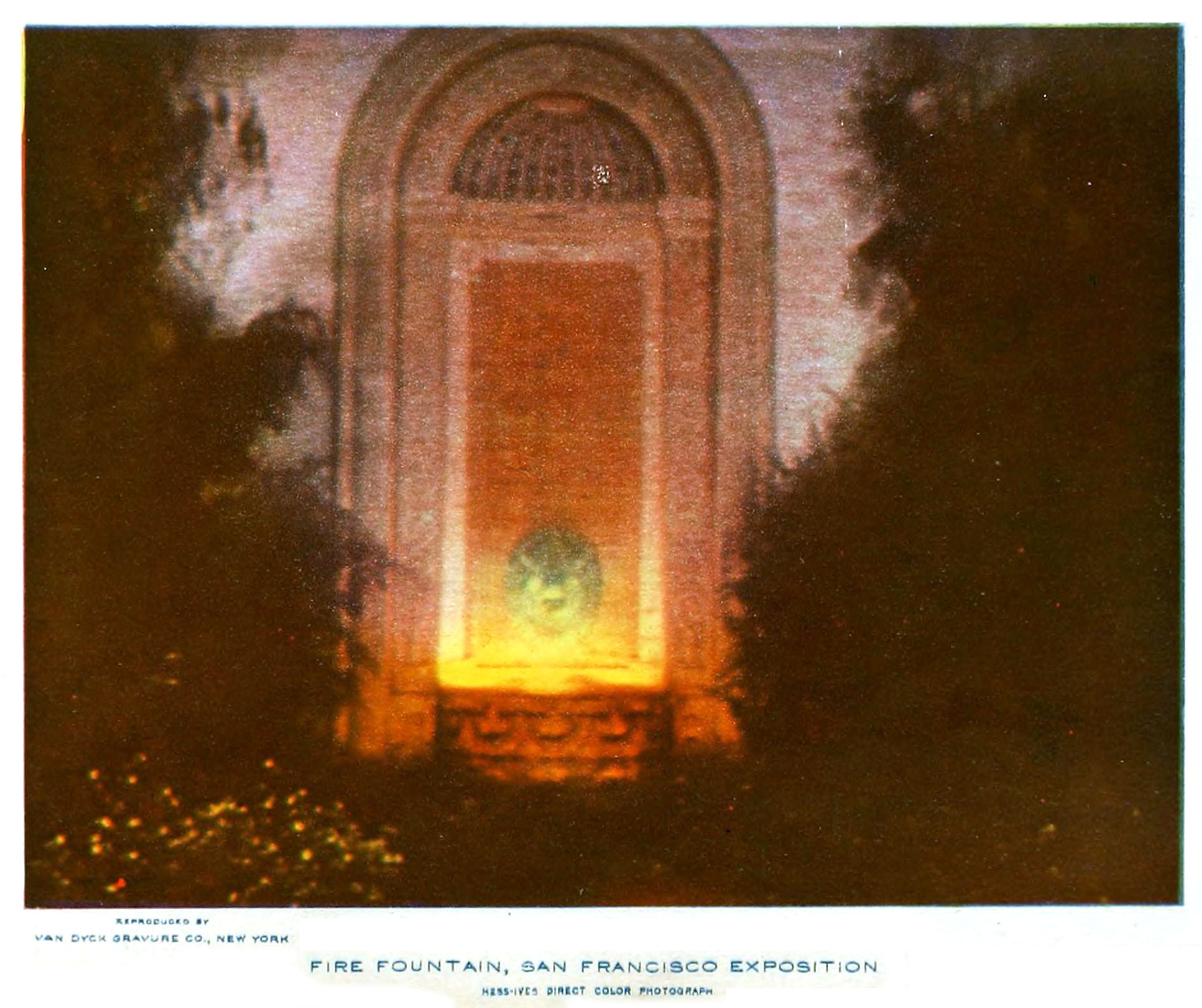
San Francisco, Autochrome Lumière (1915)

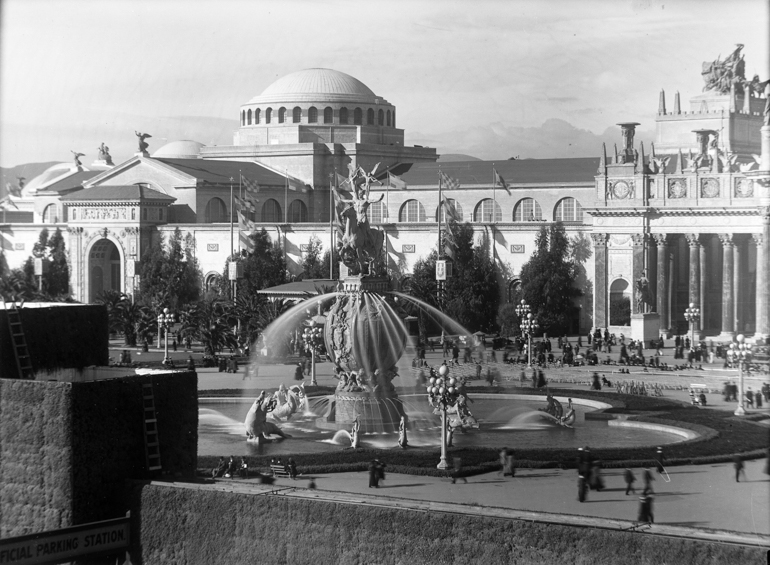
Fountain of Energy

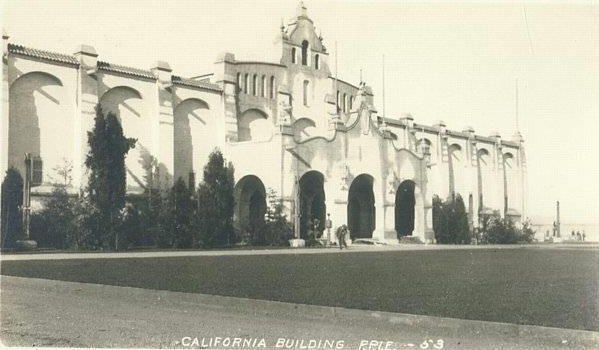
California Building

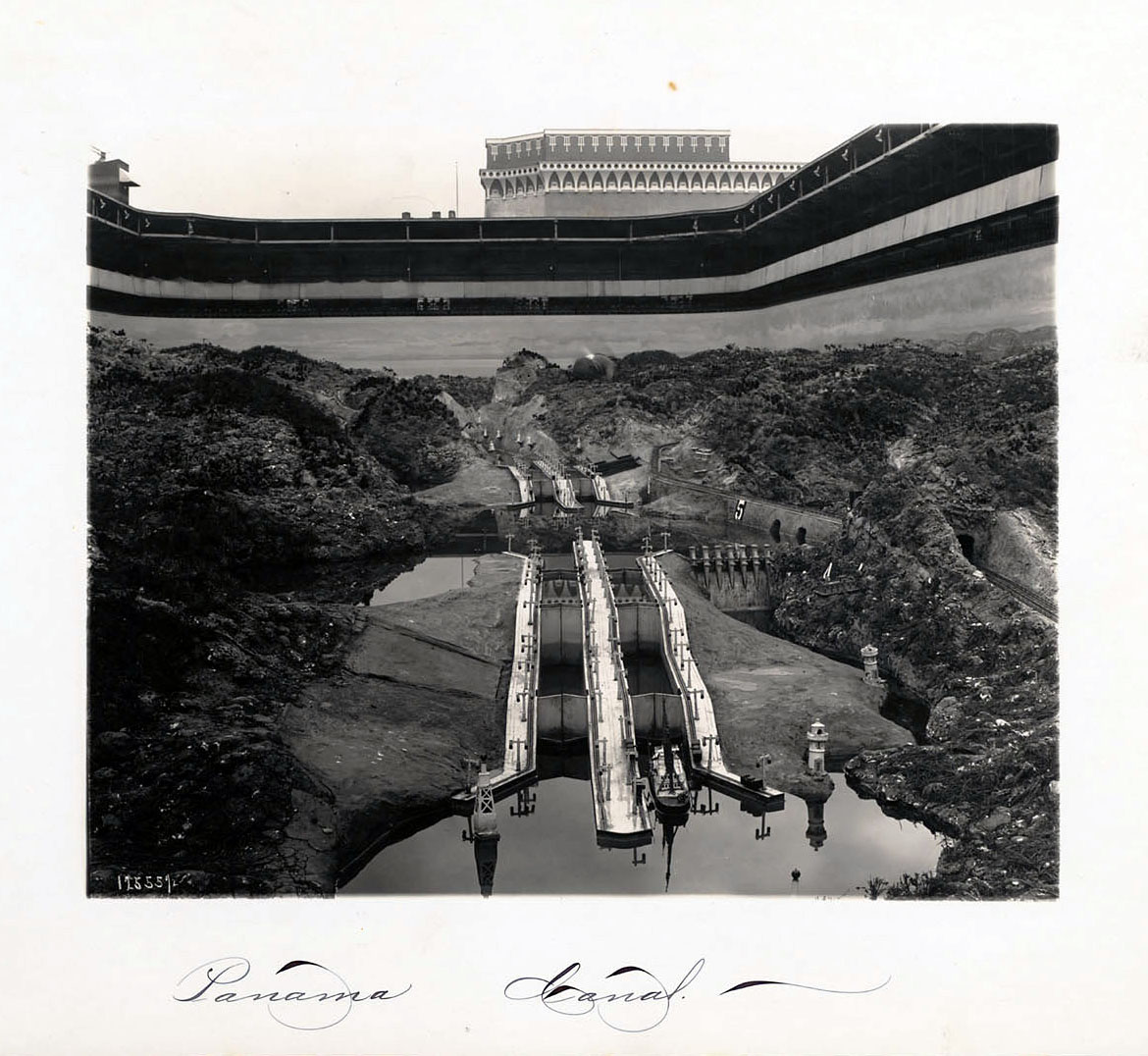
The model of the Panama Canal

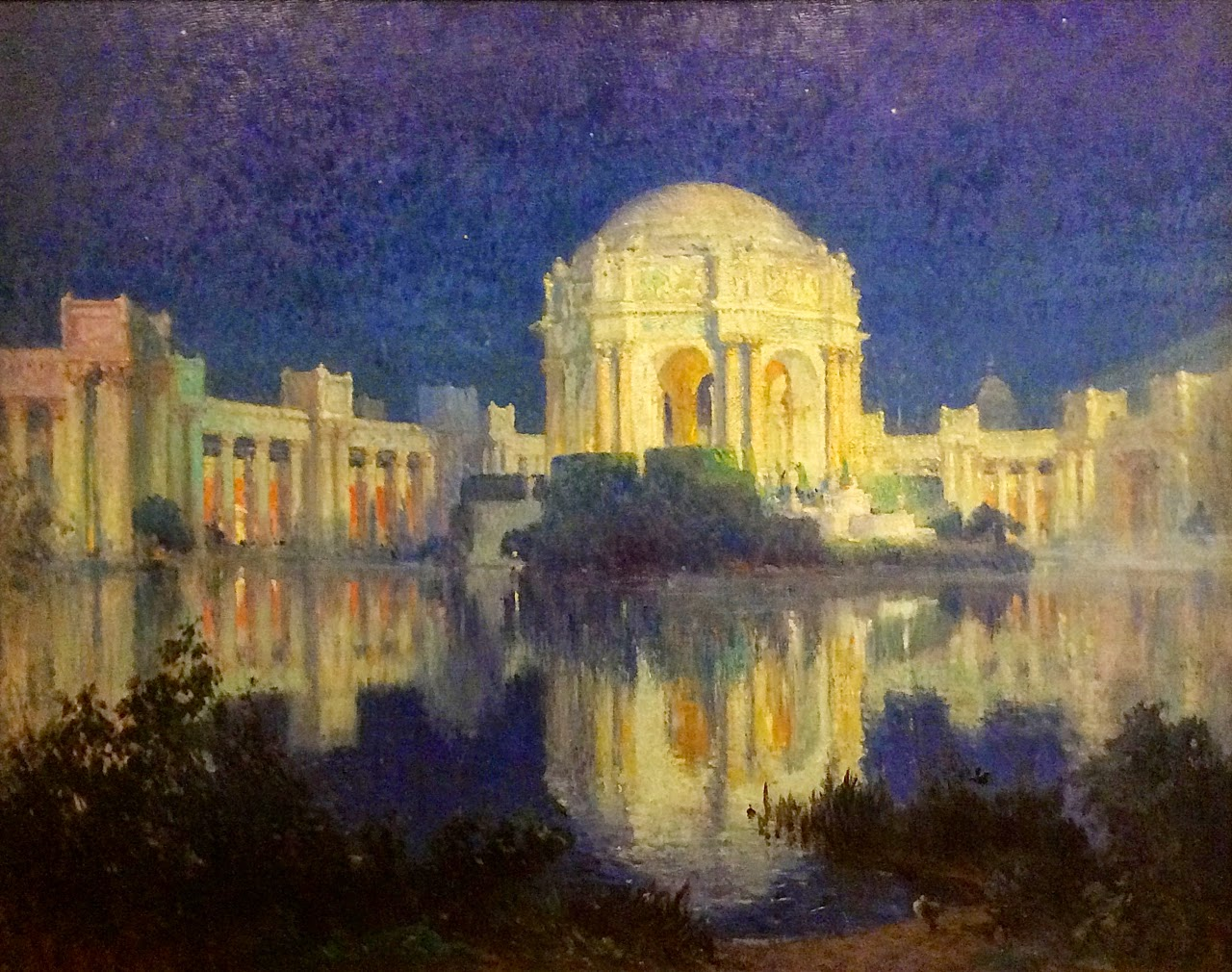
Palace of Fine Arts, by Exposition exhibitor Colin Campbell Cooper

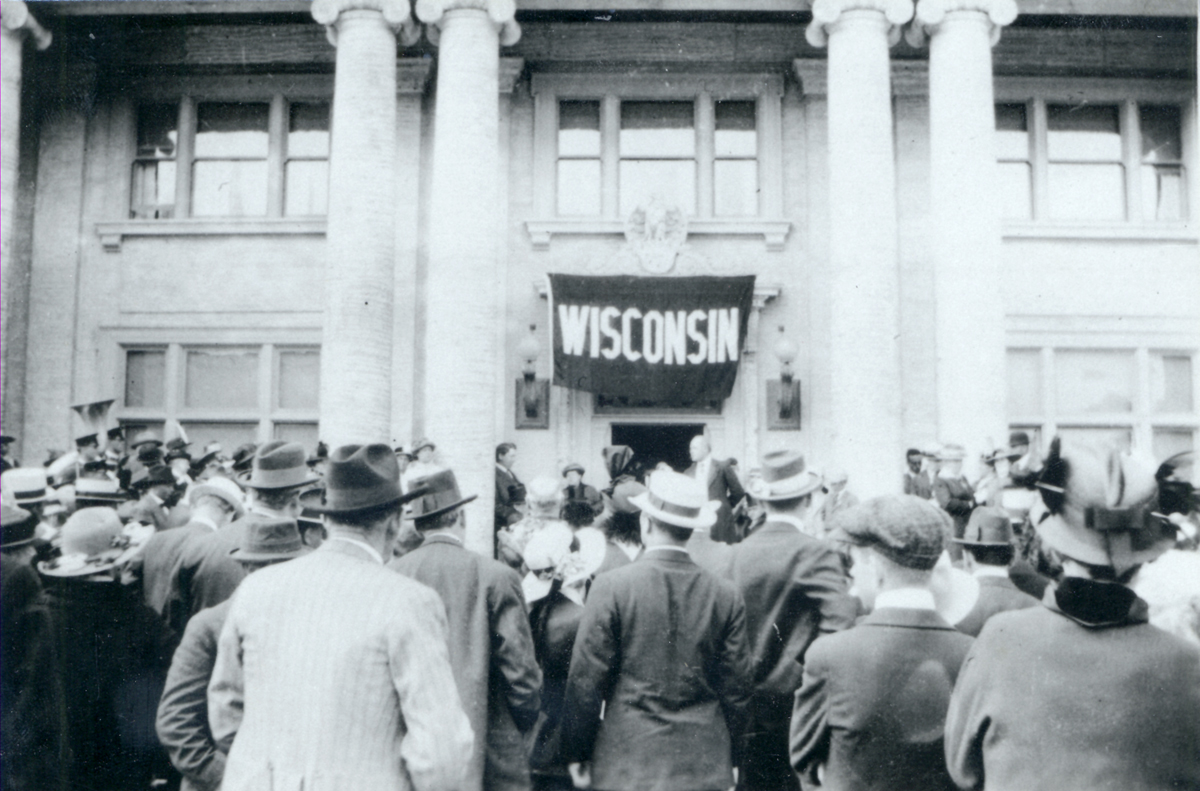
The State of Wisconsin Pavilion

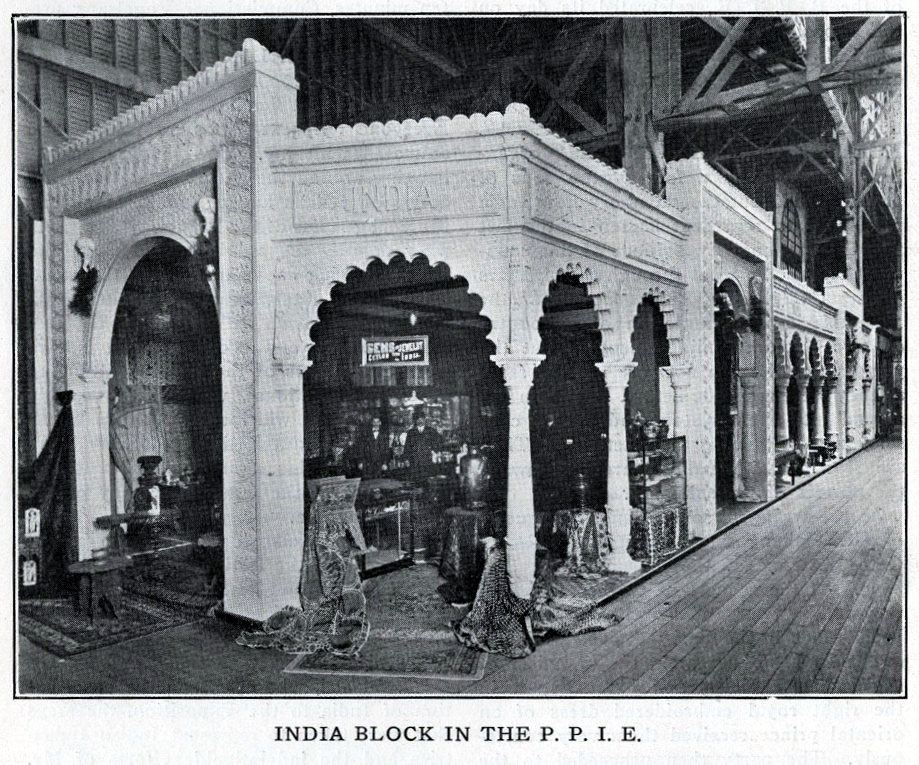
The "India Block" at the Exposition.

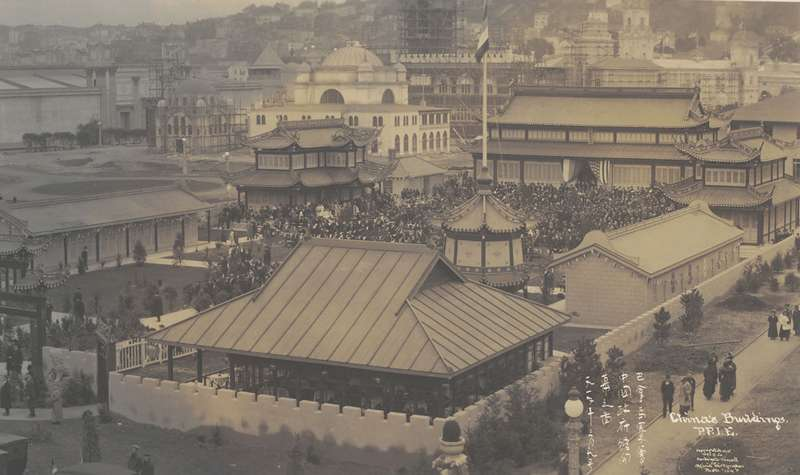
The "China Pavillion" at the Exposition

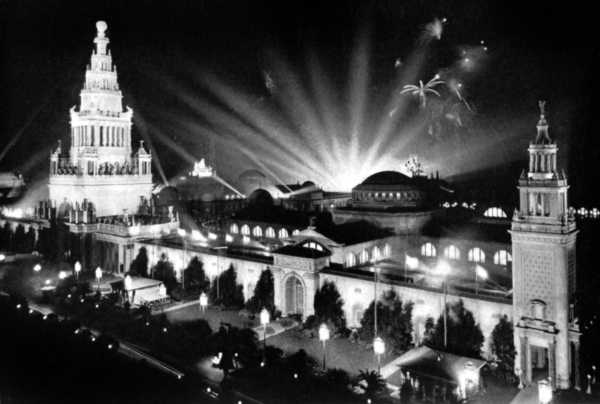
Floodlit pavilion at the Panama–Pacific International Exposition. The Tower of Jewels on the left, and the Italian Tower on the right

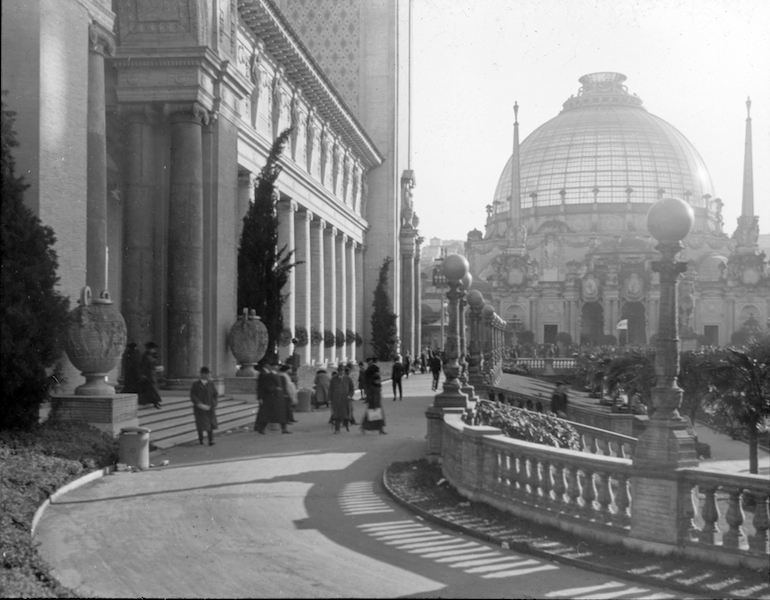
The Court of Palms, with the Palace of Horticulture at background

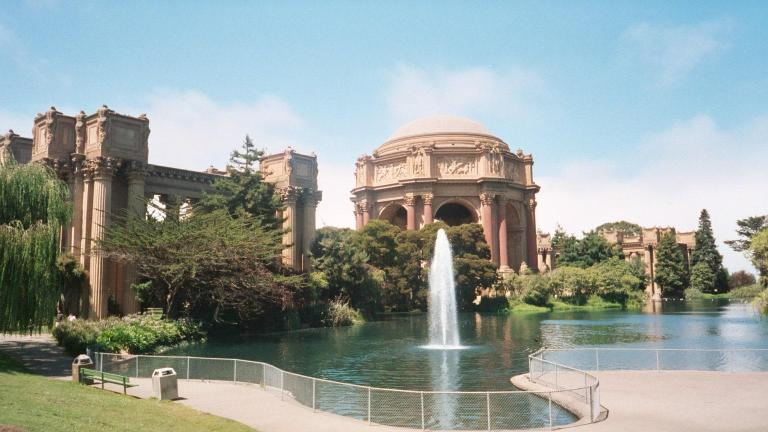
Modern picture of the Palace of Fine Arts, the only building surviving today (reconstructed) still on the exposition grounds

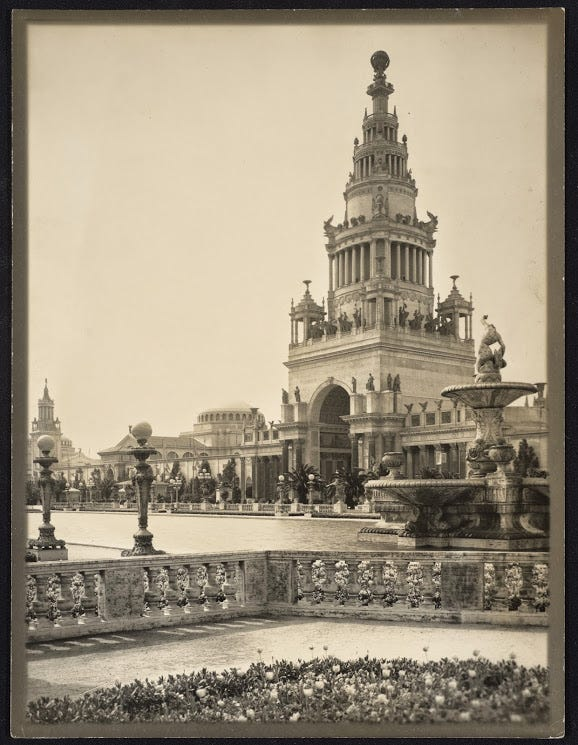
Willard Worden, Tower of Jewels

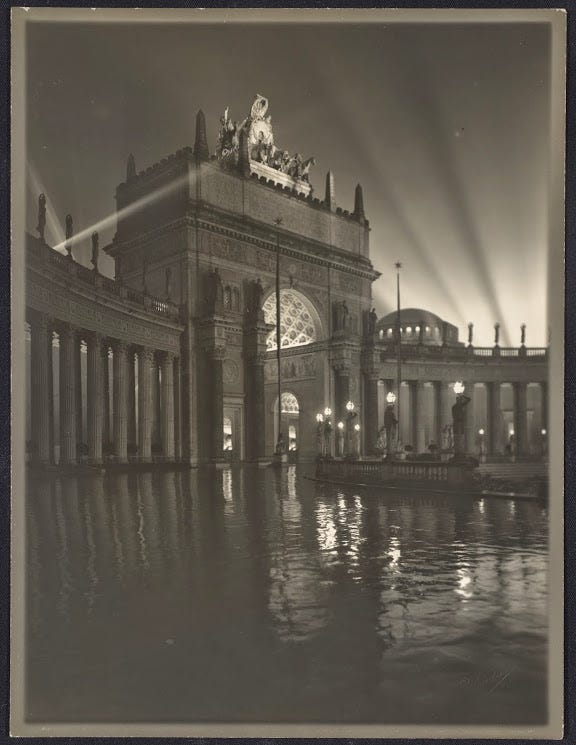
Willard Worden, Arch of the Rising Sun

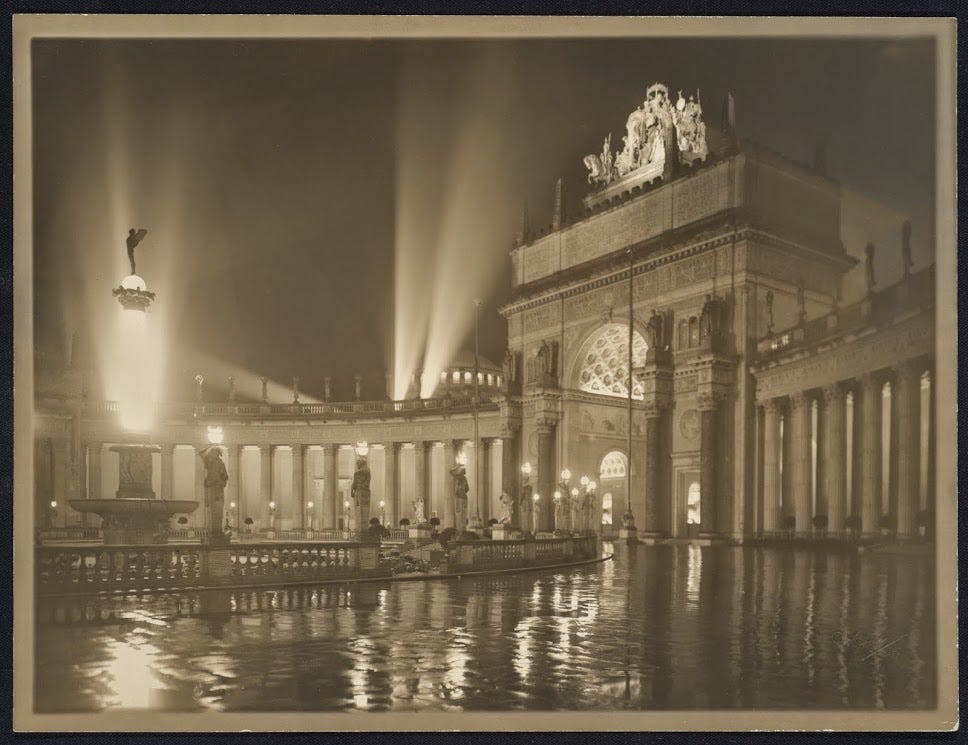
Willard Worden, Arch of the Rising Sun

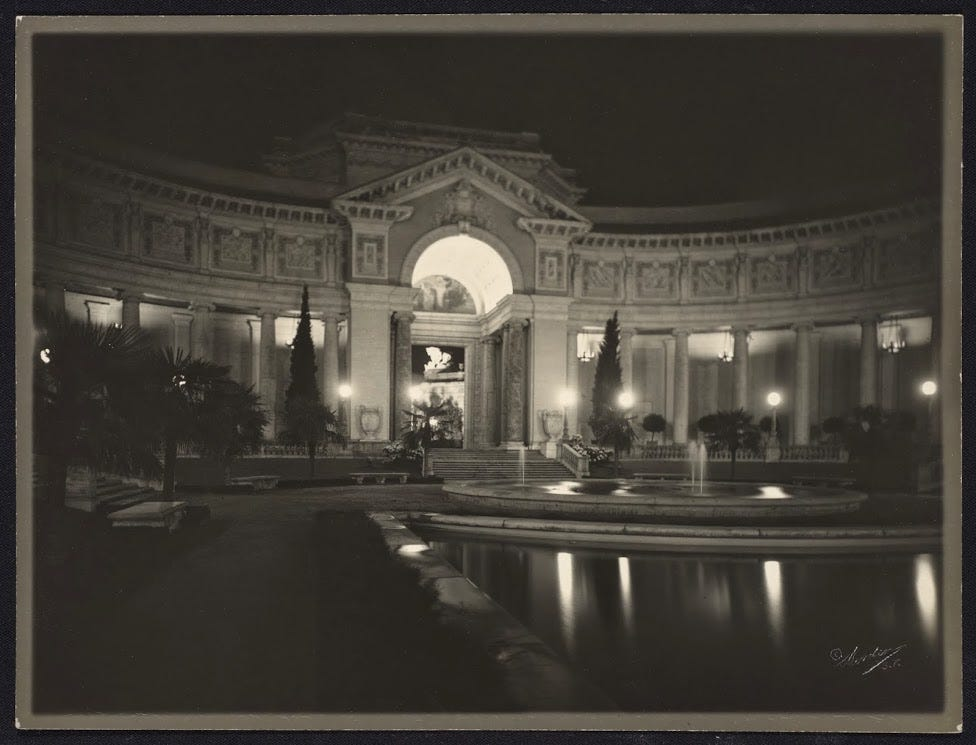
Willard Worden, Court of Palms at Night

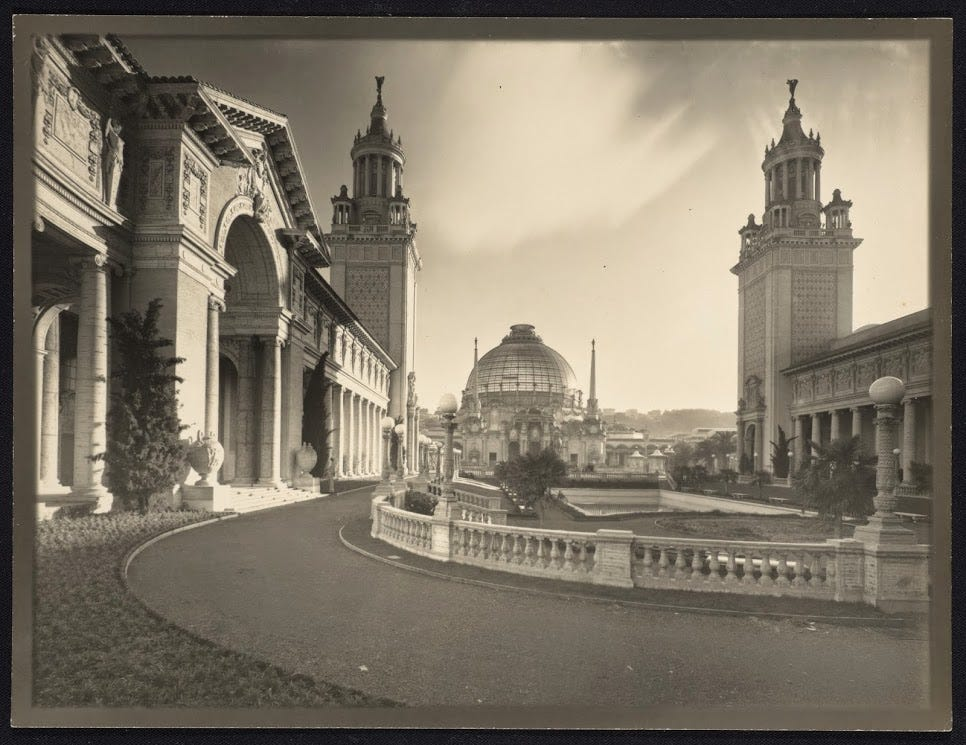
Willard Worden, Court of Palms

== See also ==
- The Tower of Jewels
- The Pioneer, a sculpture by Solon Borglum that debuted at the exposition
- Mabel and Fatty Viewing the World's Fair at San Francisco
- "Lines on "The Muse Finding the Head of Orpheus" by John E. D. Trask
- Golden Gate International Exposition (1939–40 SF World's Fair)
- List of world expositions
- List of world's fairs
