= The Pioneer (Visalia, California) =

- U.S. National Register of Historic Places
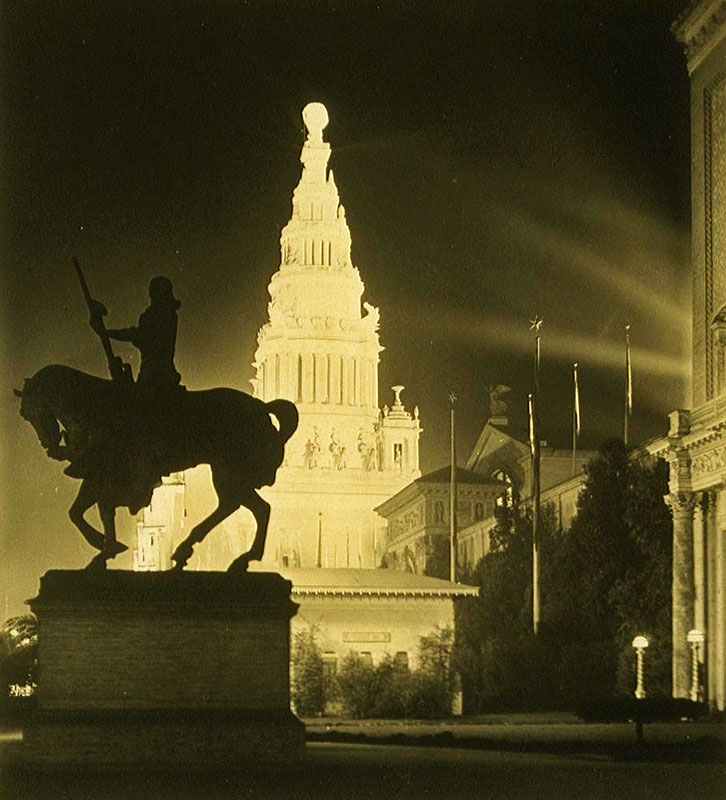

- Location within California Location within the United States
- Location: Visalia, California
- Coordinates: 36°16′50″N 119°18′43″W
- Built: 1916
- Architect: Borglum, Solon H.
- NRHP reference No.: 77000358
- Added to NRHP: May 05, 1977

This is about the sculpture in Visalia, California. For the same-named sculptures elsewhere, see Pioneer (disambiguation).

The Pioneer in Visalia, California was a sculpture by Solon H. Borglum that was first displayed at the Panama–Pacific International Exposition, a world's fair in San Francisco in 1915. It was obtained by Visalia for $150, the cost of shipping it from San Francisco.

It was listed on the National Register of Historic Places in 1977.

From 1916 to 1980, it was located in Mooney Grove Park, at 27000 South Mooney Boulevard, in Visalia. It was toppled by an earthquake in 1980 and destroyed; its internal metal had rusted away. Only the base remains.

However, it remains listed on the National Register.
