= Tower of Jewels (Panama–Pacific International Exposition) =

Building in the 1915 San Francisco world's fair

Coordinates: 37.80373°N 122.4419°W

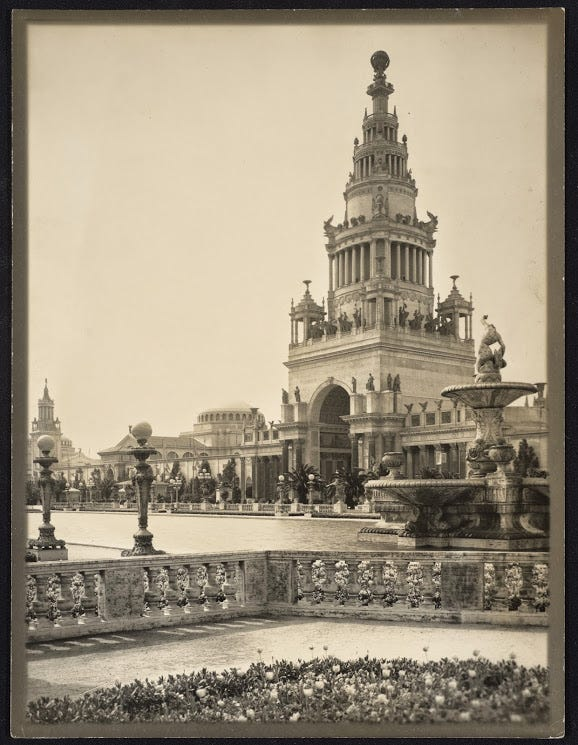
The Tower of Jewels, gelatin silver print by Willard Worden.

The Tower of Jewels was the central building at the Panama–Pacific International Exposition, the 1915 world's fair held in San Francisco, California.

== History ==
Designed by architect Thomas Hastings, of the firm of Carrère and Hastings, the combination triumphal arch-and-tower was 435 feet (132.59 m) tall. It was covered with more than 100,000 1-7/8 inch (47 mm) diameter Novagems, cut glass faceted "jewels", that sparkled in the sunlight, and were illuminated at night by more than fifty spotlights. Originally named just The Tower, the "appellation 'of Jewels' became an addition to the original title, after the tower was thus gorgeously arrayed."

In front of the Tower, the Fountain of Energy flowed at the center of the South Gardens, flanked by the Palace of Horticulture on the west and the Festival Hall to the east. The arch of the Tower served as the gateway to the Court of the Universe, leading to the Court of the Four Seasons to the west and the Court of Abundance to the east.

The Tower was a temporary structure, constructed of staff, a combination of plaster and burlap-like fiber applied over a skeleton structure of wood and steel. It was demolished following the Exposition. The Novagems that adorned the tower were removed prior to demolition, and a small brass medallion attached to each "jewel" indicating that it hung on the tower during the exposition. These jewels were individually boxed and sold for $1.00 each.

== Gallery ==
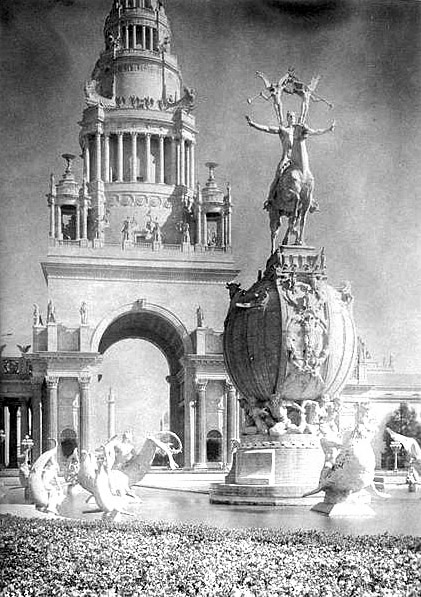
The Tower of Jewels behind the "Fountain of Energy"

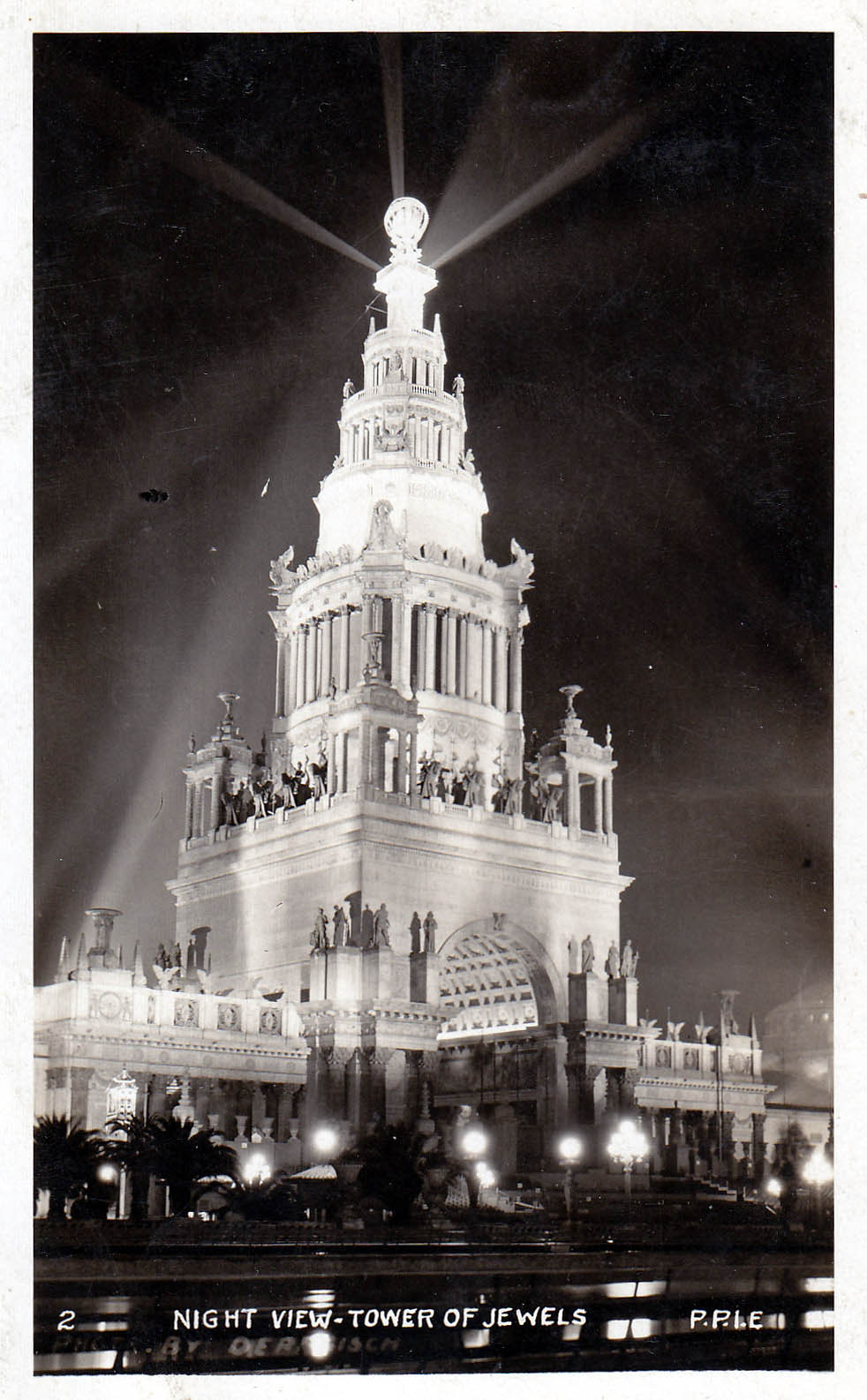
The tower at night

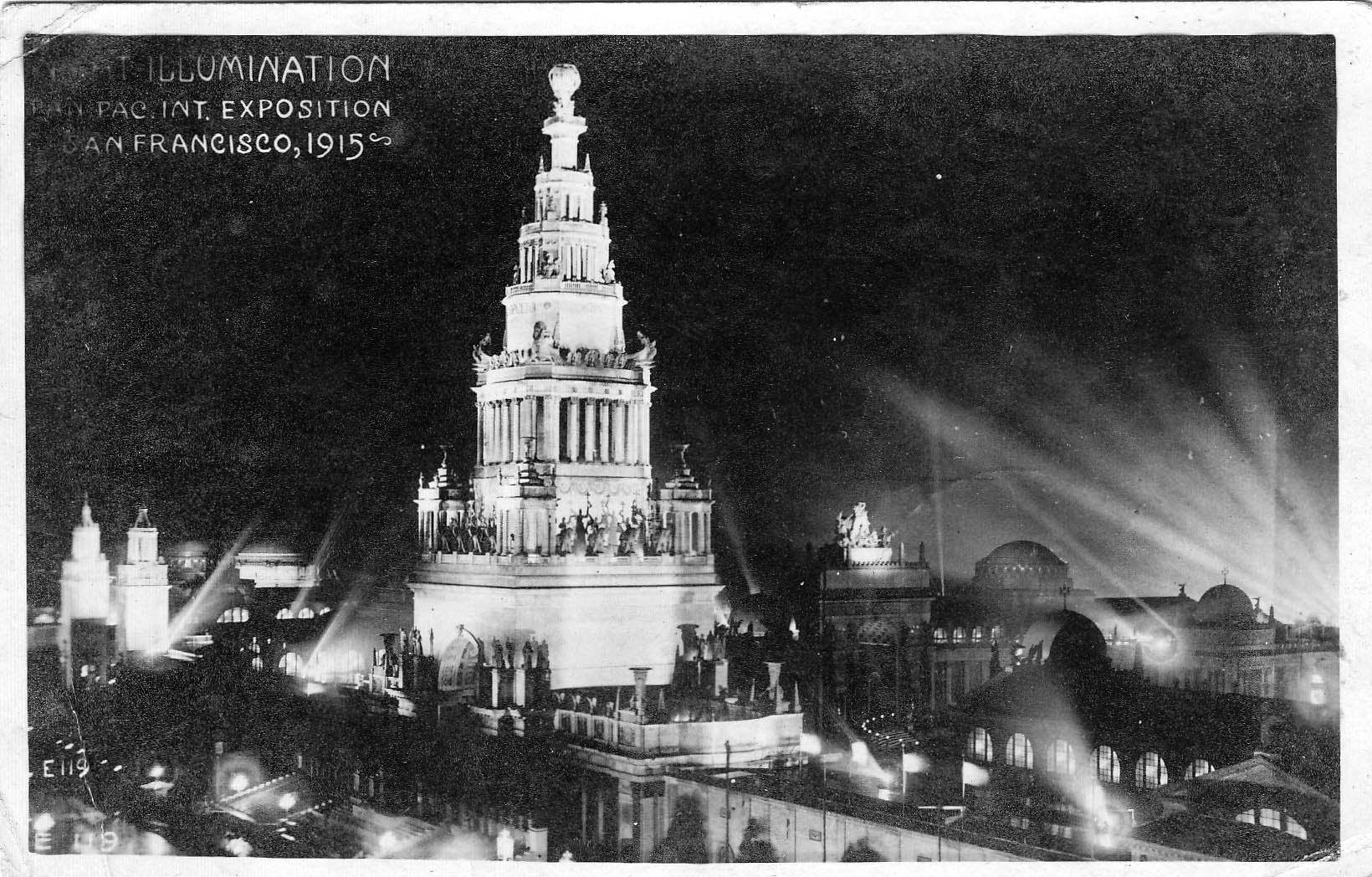
Panoramic view of the tower at night

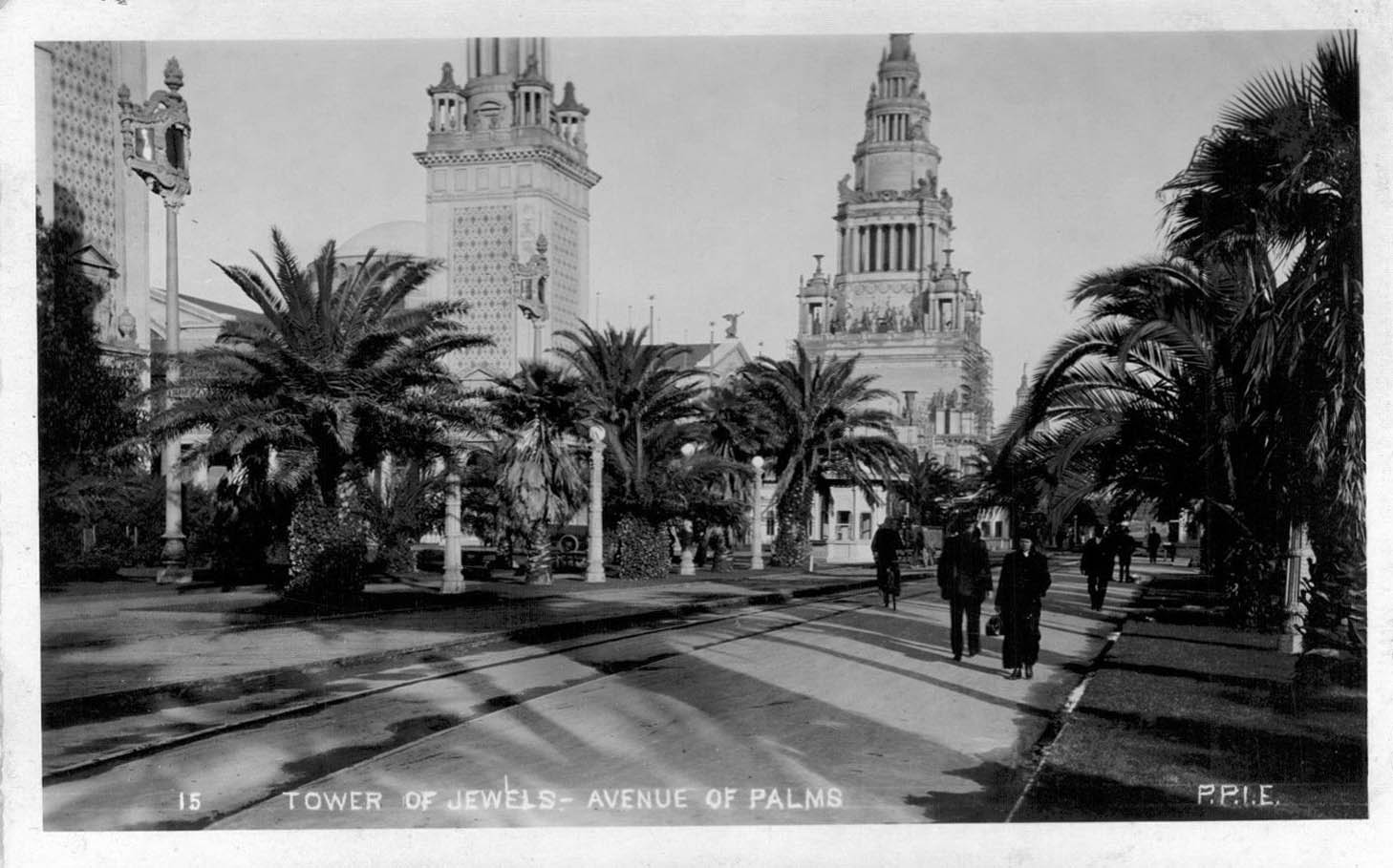
The Avenue of Palms with the tower at background

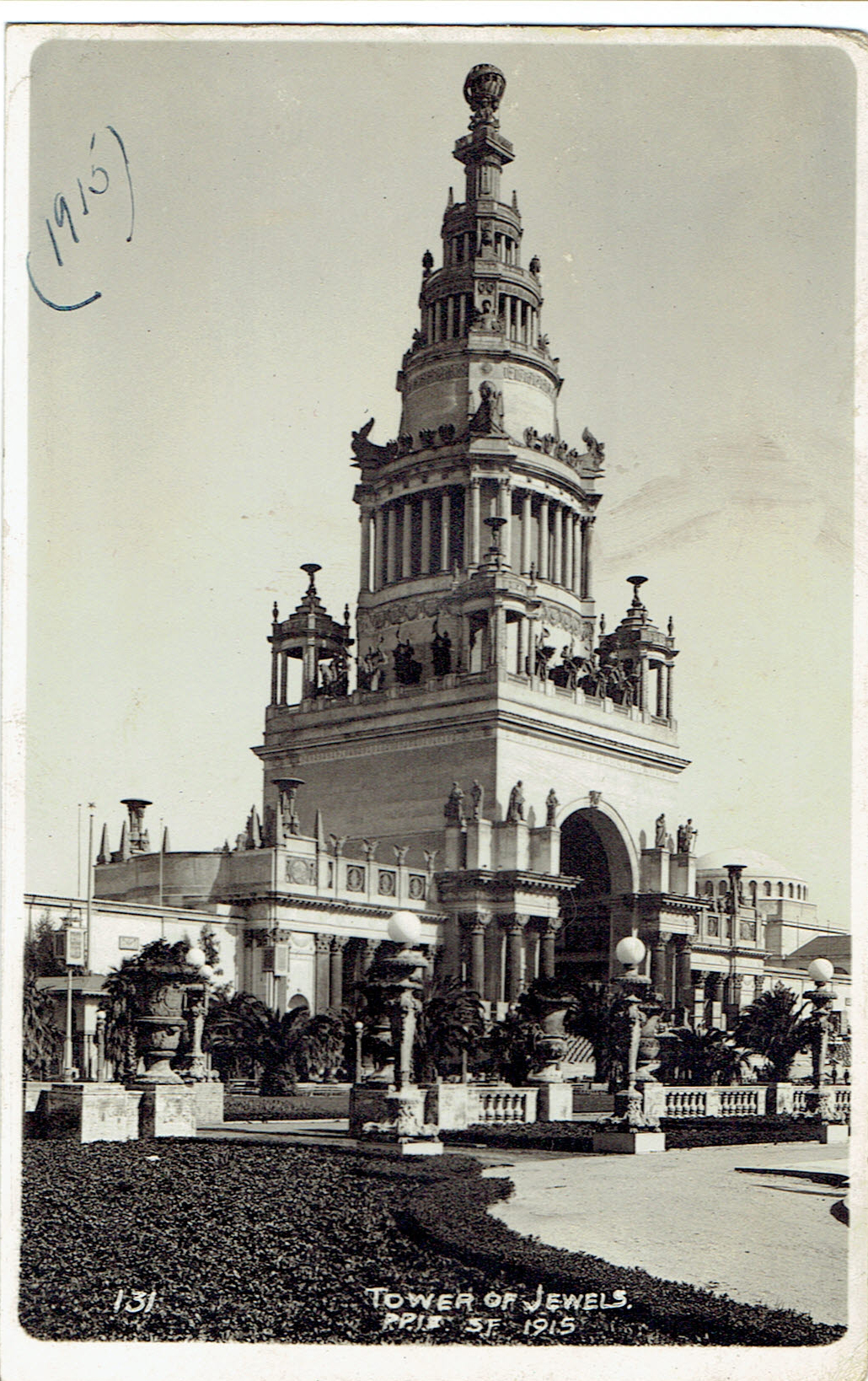
The Tower of Jewels
