= Willard Worden =

American photographer (1868-1946)

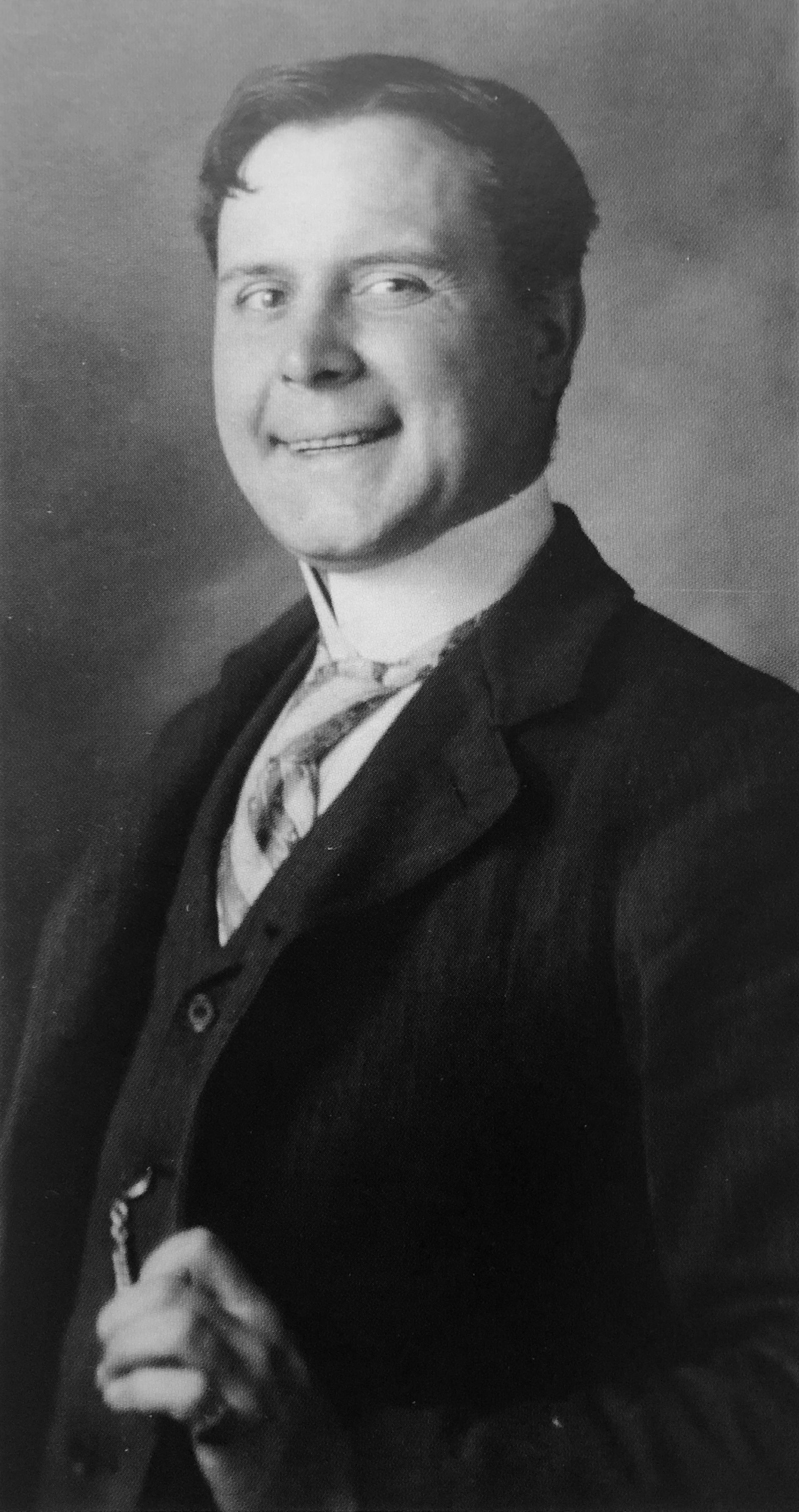
- Self-portrait, c. 1910-1915
- Born: Willard Elmer Worden; November 20, 1868; Smyrna, Delaware
- Died: September 6, 1946 (aged 77); Palo Alto, California
- Notable work: Portals of the Past (various versions)
- Movement: Fine-art photography
- Awards: Medal of Honor, Panama-Pacific International Exposition of 1915

Willard Elmer Worden (November 20, 1868 – September 6, 1946) was an American photographer active in the San Francisco Bay Area in the first decades of the 1900s. Trained as an artist and self-taught as a photographer, he attained recognition with his photographs documenting the aftermath of the 1906 San Francisco earthquake. He later specialized in "art photographs" depicting seascapes, landscapes, and landmarks of Northern California and San Francisco, sometimes colored by hand with watercolor or oil paint. His career reached its height with the exhibition of his work at the Panama-Pacific International Exposition (PPIE) of 1915 in San Francisco, and the subsequent opening of a gallery showcasing his work near Union Square. By the time of his death in 1946, Worden's work had passed out of fashion, but an archive preserving hundreds of his negatives was established at the Wells Fargo History Museum. Beginning in the 1970s, museum curators and art historians rediscovered his work. A large exhibition at the de Young Museum marking the centennial of the PPIE at the de Young Museum in 2015 included a concurrent exhibition of Worden's work, along with publication of the book Portals of the Past: The Photographs of Willard Worden.

== Early life, education, and military service ==
Worden was born on November 20, 1868, to Asa Everingham Worden (1831-1906), a Union army veteran of the Sixth Delaware Infantry, and his wife, Amy H. Allen Worden (1839-1900), both originally from New Jersey. By 1864 they had settled in Smyrna, Delaware, where Willard was born. Asa obtained washing machine patents in 1872 and 1874, for which he won commendation in Philadelphia's Centennial International Exhibition of 1876, the first world's fair held in the United States. By 1881 the family was living in Philadelphia, where Asa ran his own business selling washing machines for the next twenty-five years.

It is unclear whether Worden studied painting at the Pennsylvania Academy of the Fine Arts but by the early 1890s Worden had joined the circle of John Sloan, William James Glackens, and Robert Henri (1865-1929), future members of the Ashcan School of urban realist painters. Sloan and Worden belonged to the Unity Art Club of Philadelphia, which offered life drawing sessions in a bohemian atmosphere. The two young men also worked together in the art department of The Philadelphia Inquirer, and on their days off ventured into the suburbs to draw and paint in the open air. Worden was also a member of the short-lived Charcoal Club, another cooperative spearheaded by Henri and Sloan in the spring of 1893. Henri wrote of Worden's "innocent good humored garolousness [sic]."

In June 1895, Worden enlisted in the National Guard of Pennsylvania and embarked on what would be a protracted military career. A later magazine profile of Worden noted his participation in the Spanish-American War, which "interrupted his art studies just when he was preparing to go to Paris to complete them...leaving brushes and palette behind... among his equipment was one of the smallest cameras then to be had. He returned a few months later a first lieutenant and also an enthusiastic photographer.

After his first tour of duty, Worden reenlisted with the Eleventh Volunteer Cavalry in September 1899, which was deployed to quell the Philippine Insurrection. He participated in twenty engagements in the Philippines, and suffered from tropical ulcers on both legs.

Worden's regiment returned to the United States in March, 1901, and he was mustered out of service in San Francisco, where he decided to put down roots.

== Career ==
In San Francisco, the 32-year-old Worden very quickly established himself as professional photographer, and was so listed in the Crocker-Langley San Francisco city directory published in May, 1901.

The first and only catalogue of Worden's photographs, San Francisco Views, bears a copyright date of 1904 and states that "each view in the original is a work of art in black and white..[and] may be obtained by mail order from any dealer who handles our products, or from the artist and publisher." The thirty-two halftones mounted on black construction paper provide "an extraordinary travelogue of the city before the 1906 earthquake, while demonstrating the photographer's mastery of his craft within a few short years of his arrival."

Worden also visited Yosemite National Park and captured a "a classic view of El Capitan."

=== 1906 earthquake ===
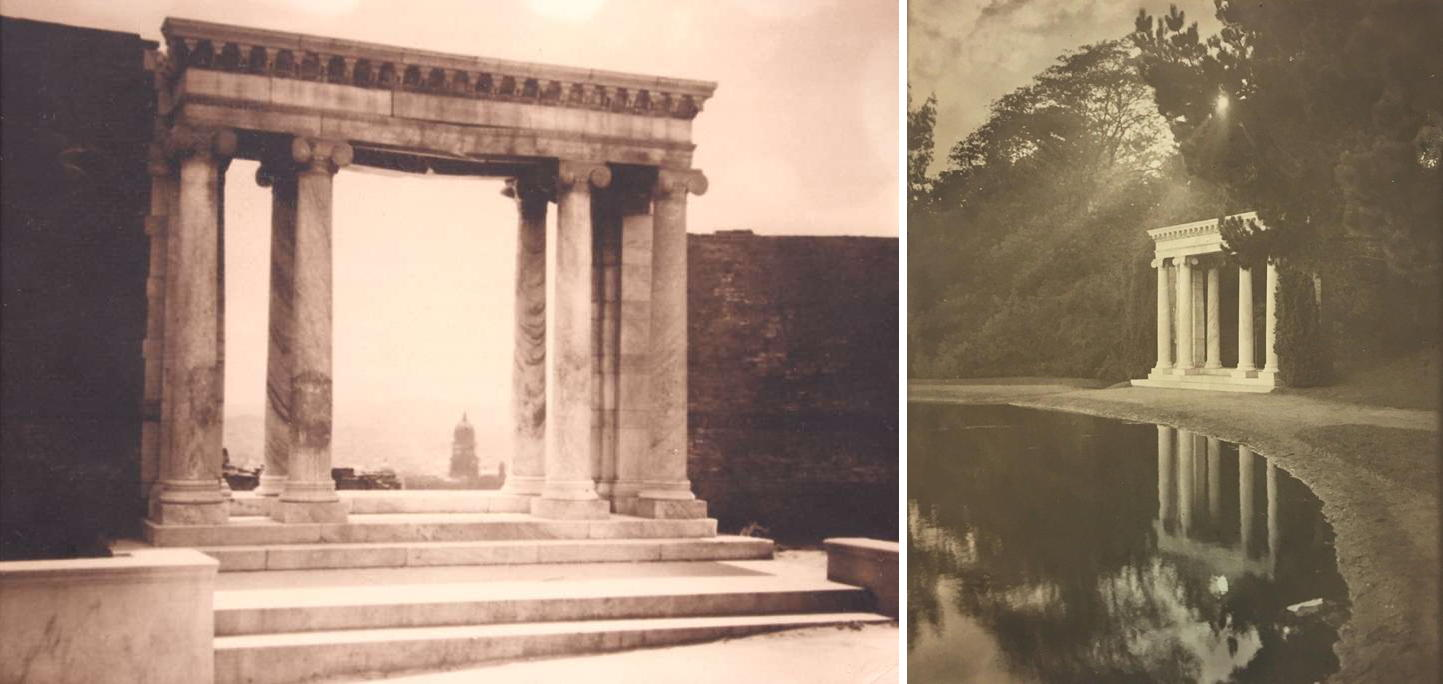
Portals of the Past: A photo by Worden after the 1906 earthquake, and another after the ruins were moved to Golden Gate Park.

The Crocker-Langley directory for the year commencing May 1905 gives two addresses for Worden, including 26 Montgomery Street; "it seems likely that Worden was operating a gallery in this building at the time of the disastrous earthquake and fires of April 1906 that left it and the surrounding area in ruins."

Worden seized the opportunity to capture history in the making, recording scenes of the fire and its aftermath using a handheld film camera and a four-by-five-inch view camera with glass negatives; he also photographed damage to the Stanford University campus. The resulting work fed the general public's fascination for its sensationalist content, but was also of interest to seismologists, architects, and urban planners, as evidenced by inclusion of his photos in The California Earthquake of April 18, 1906: Report of the State Earthquake Investigation Commission, published by the Carnegie Institution of Washington, DC, in 1908.

After the destruction, all that remained of the Alban N. Towne mansion on Nob Hill were six marble columns and a lintel. When viewed from a certain angle, the empty porch perfectly framed the ruins of the smoldering City Hall. The haunting image became an icon of the 1906 earthquake, due largely to photographs by Worden. In 1909, the columns and lintel were relocated to Golden Gate Park, where, known as Portals of the Past, they became a monument to the city's grief and a symbol of its endurance. Worden repeatedly photographed the Portals both at the original Nob Hill site and at the final location on the banks of Lloyd Lake in the park.

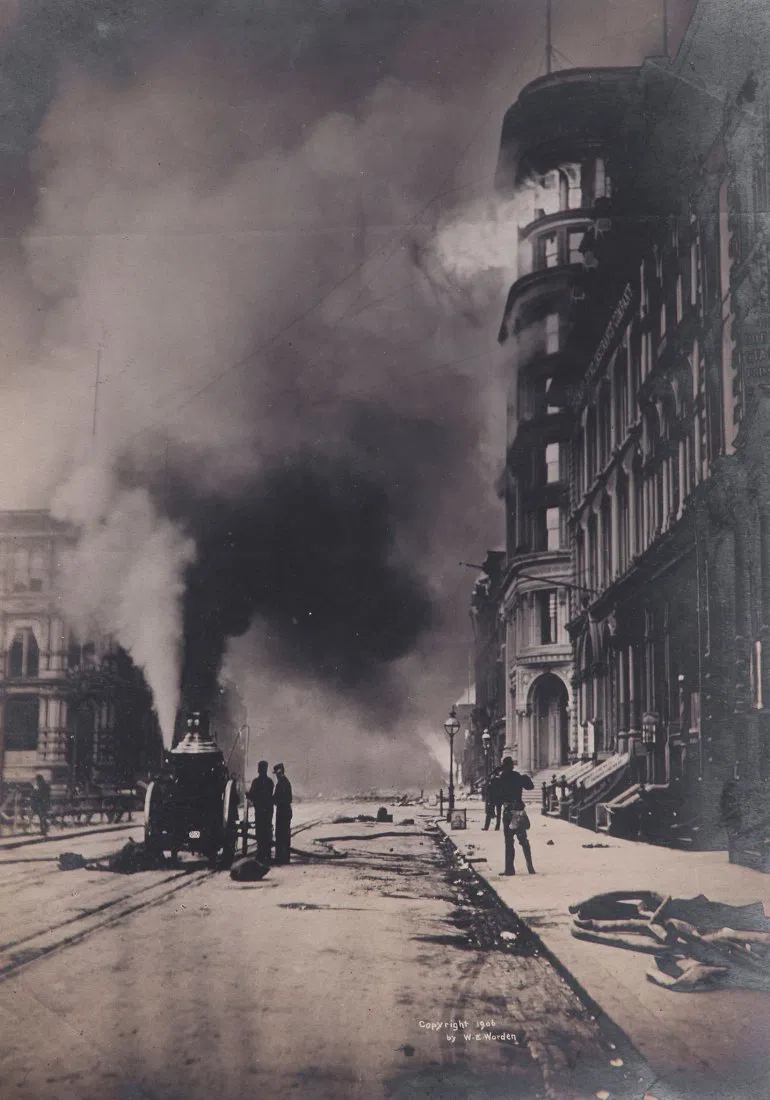
Firefighters

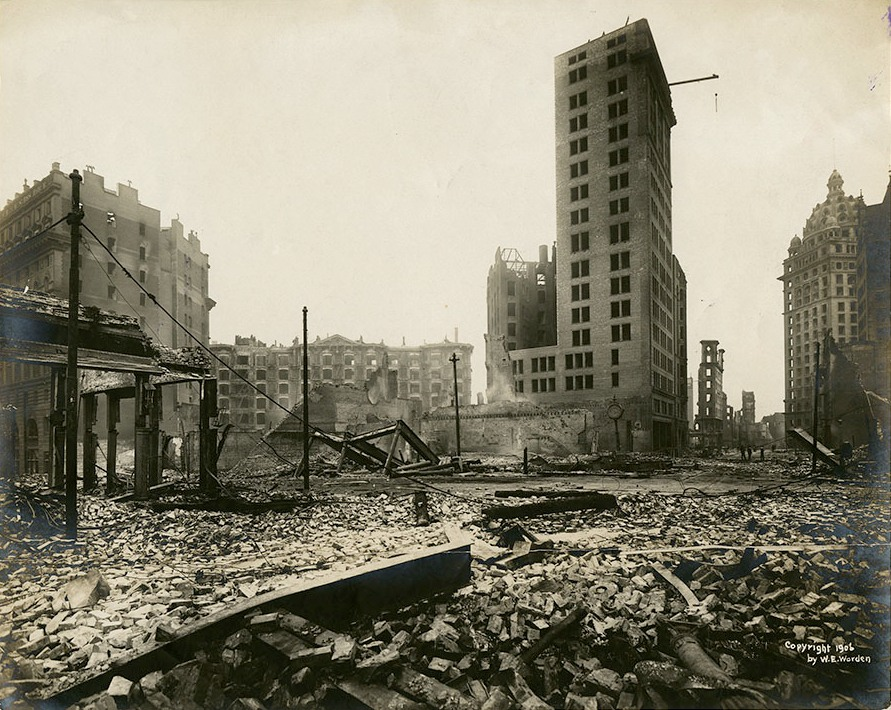
View from Kearny Street

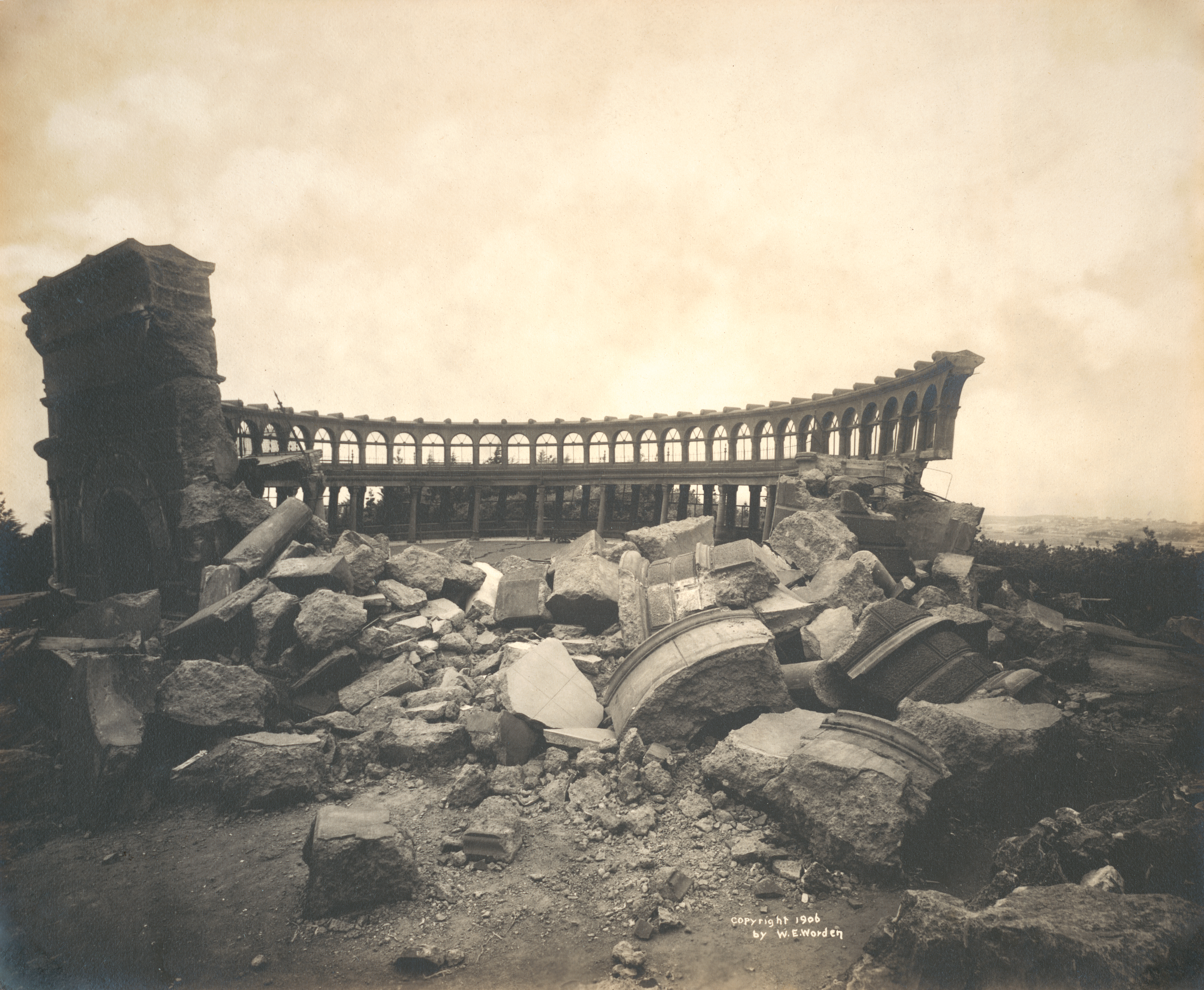
Observatory in ruins

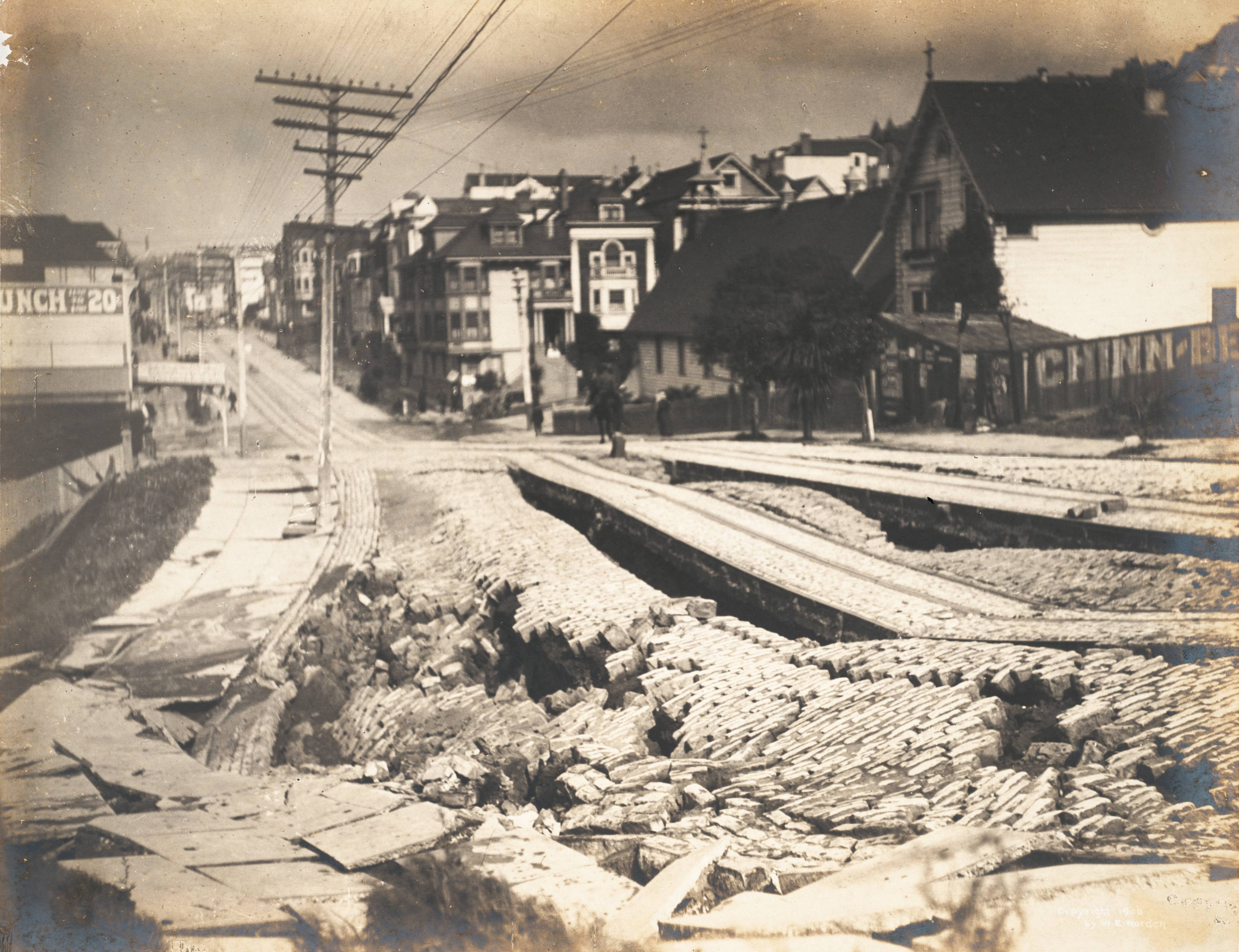
Union Street

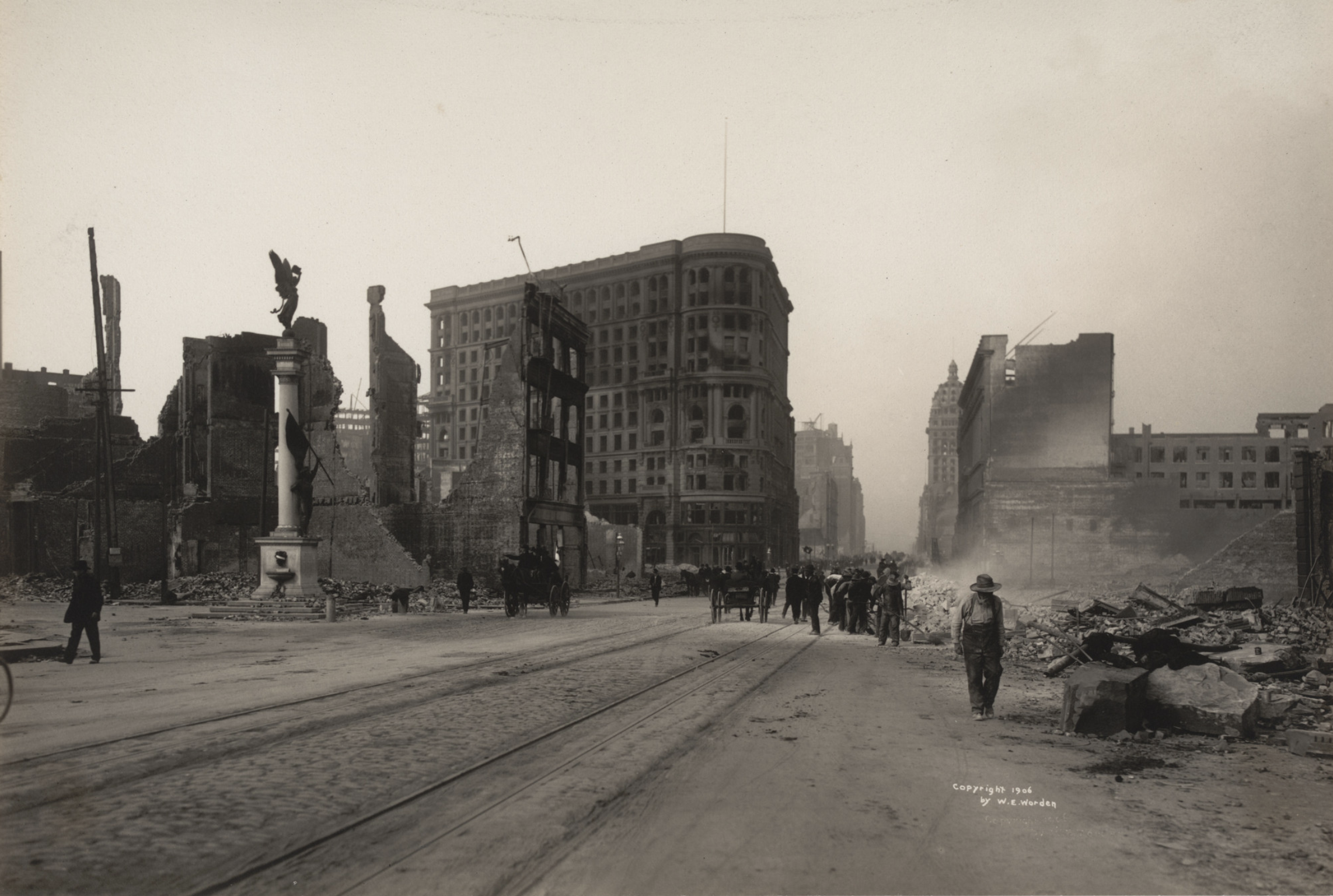
Market Street

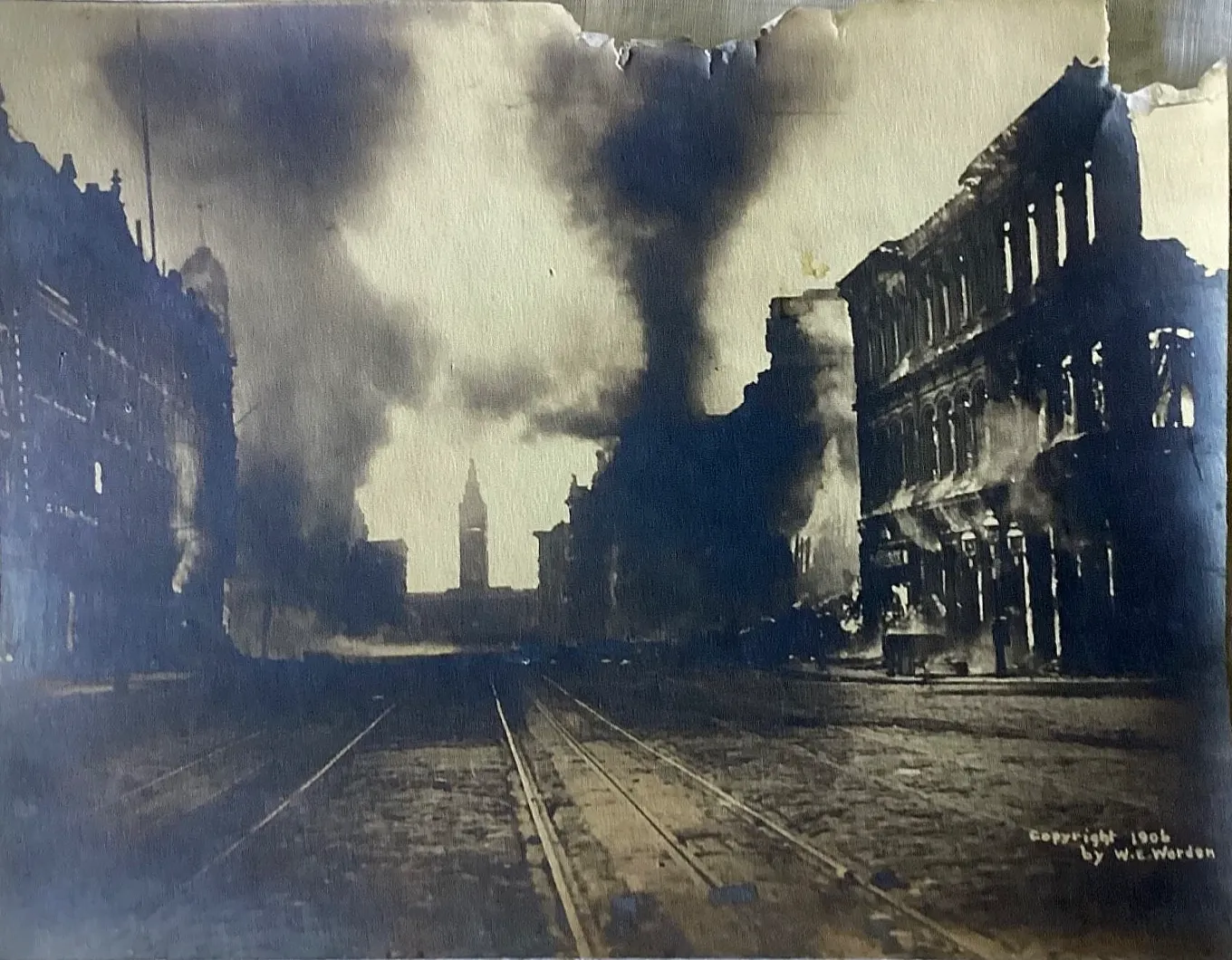
Ferry Building

=== Commissions and art photography ===
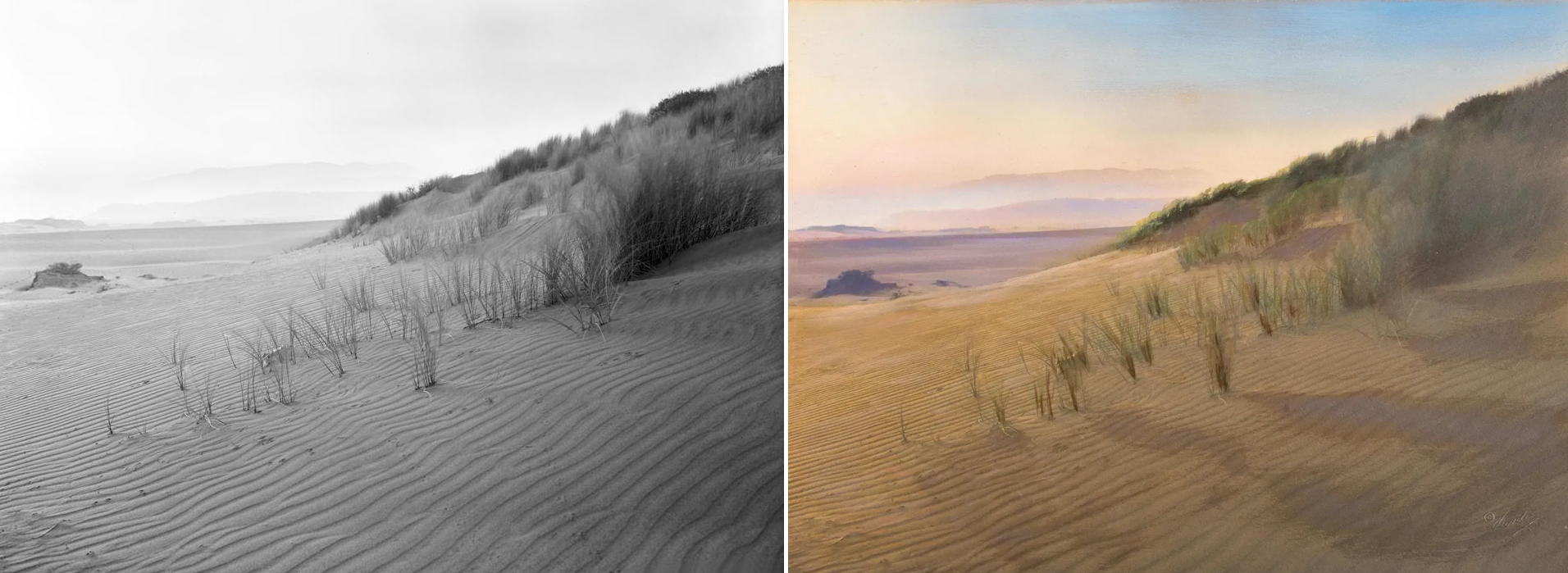
A Worden gelatin silver print of sand dunes, and the same image with applied color, both c. 1915.

On September 7, 1907, Worden recorded another spectacular disaster, the burning of Adolph Sutro's Cliff House, built on a rocky crag overlooking the Pacific Ocean.

As the city began to rebuild, Worden's time was divided between commissions to document various construction projects and expanding his retail line of picturesque landscapes and seascapes. In 1911, one of his many photographs of Seal Rocks appeared in Paul Elder's book California the Beautiful, opposite a poem by Bret Harte. Around 1912 he created an extensive series of views of the Japanese Tea Garden in Golden Gate Park.

Calling his work "art photography," Worden produced hundreds of shoreline views, with sailing ships, seagulls in flight ("exquisite beyond description"), and beachgoers set against an endless variety of cloud formations and atmospheric conditions that he sometimes enhanced in the darkroom. "Among the most successful and innovative of Worden's landscapes are his photographs of sand dunes near the western shoreline. A number of his contemporaries explored similar subject matter on both the east and west coasts, but what set Worden's 'dunescapes' apart are their high horizons and relatively tight cropping that emphasize the sinuous windswept patterns in the sand."

Like other commercial studios before the availability of color films, Worden adopted the practice of painting over monochromatic photographs as a way of enhancing their naturalism and decorative appeal to middle-class consumers seeking a less expensive alternative to watercolors or oil paintings to decorate their homes. "Some were tinted with heavy applications of oil paint that obscure the photographic base while others were more lightly enhanced with transparent watercolors." To meet demand, Worden delegated much of the actual painting of his photographs to his specially trained colorists, who remained anonymous. (In the Crocker-Langley city directory for 1925, Sargent Johnson was listed as an artist working for Worden.)

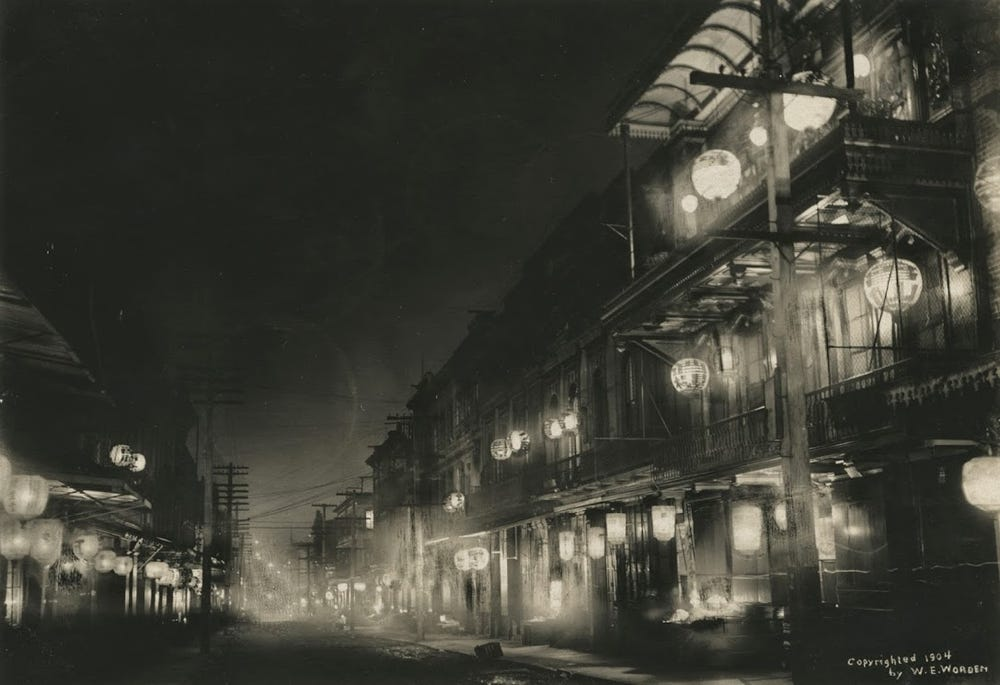
Midnight in Chinatown, 1903

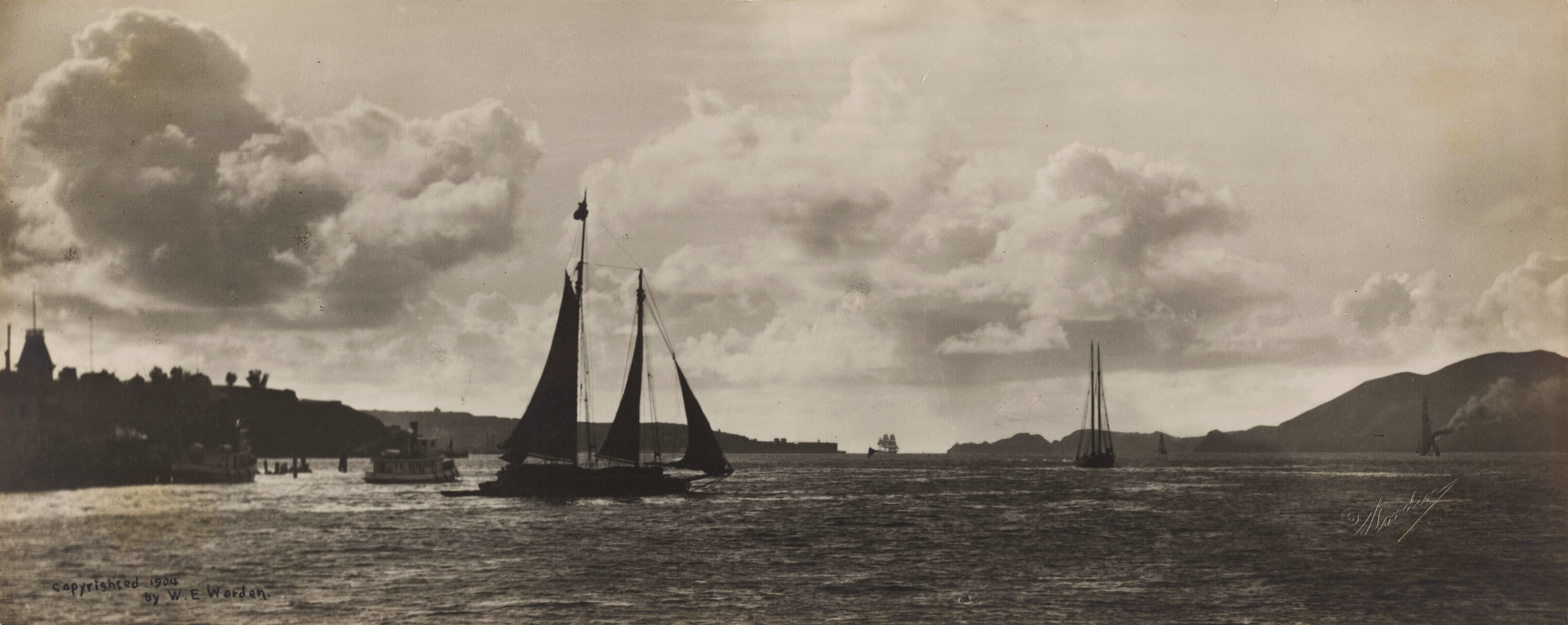
Ships on San Francisco Bay, 1904

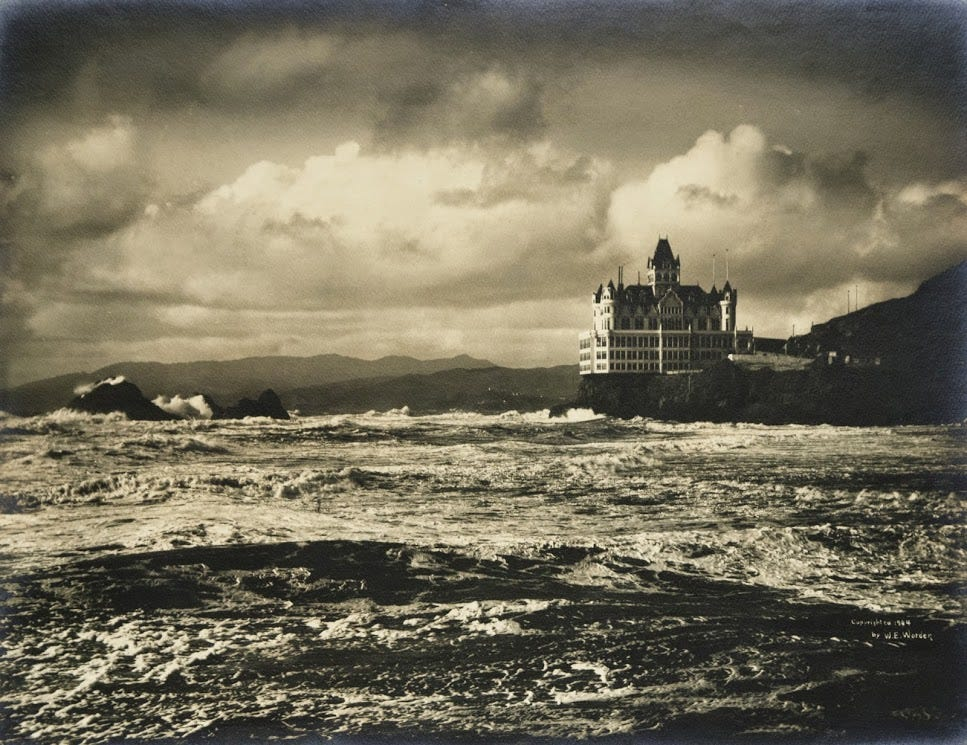
Cliff House, 1904

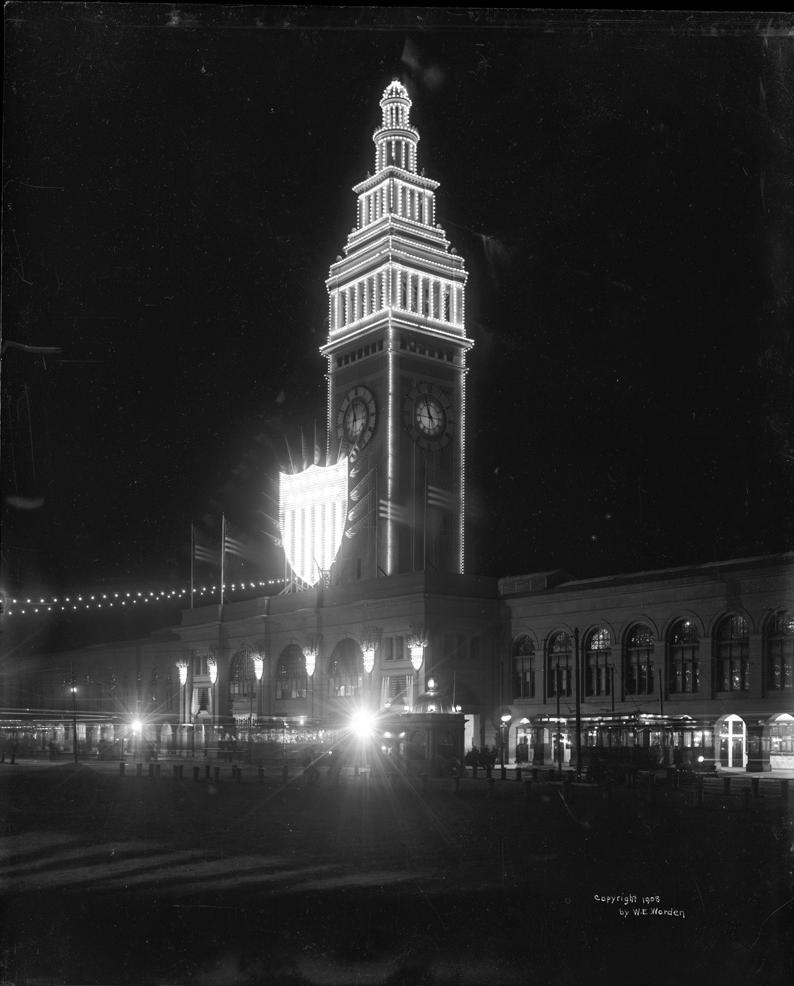
Ferry Building, 1908

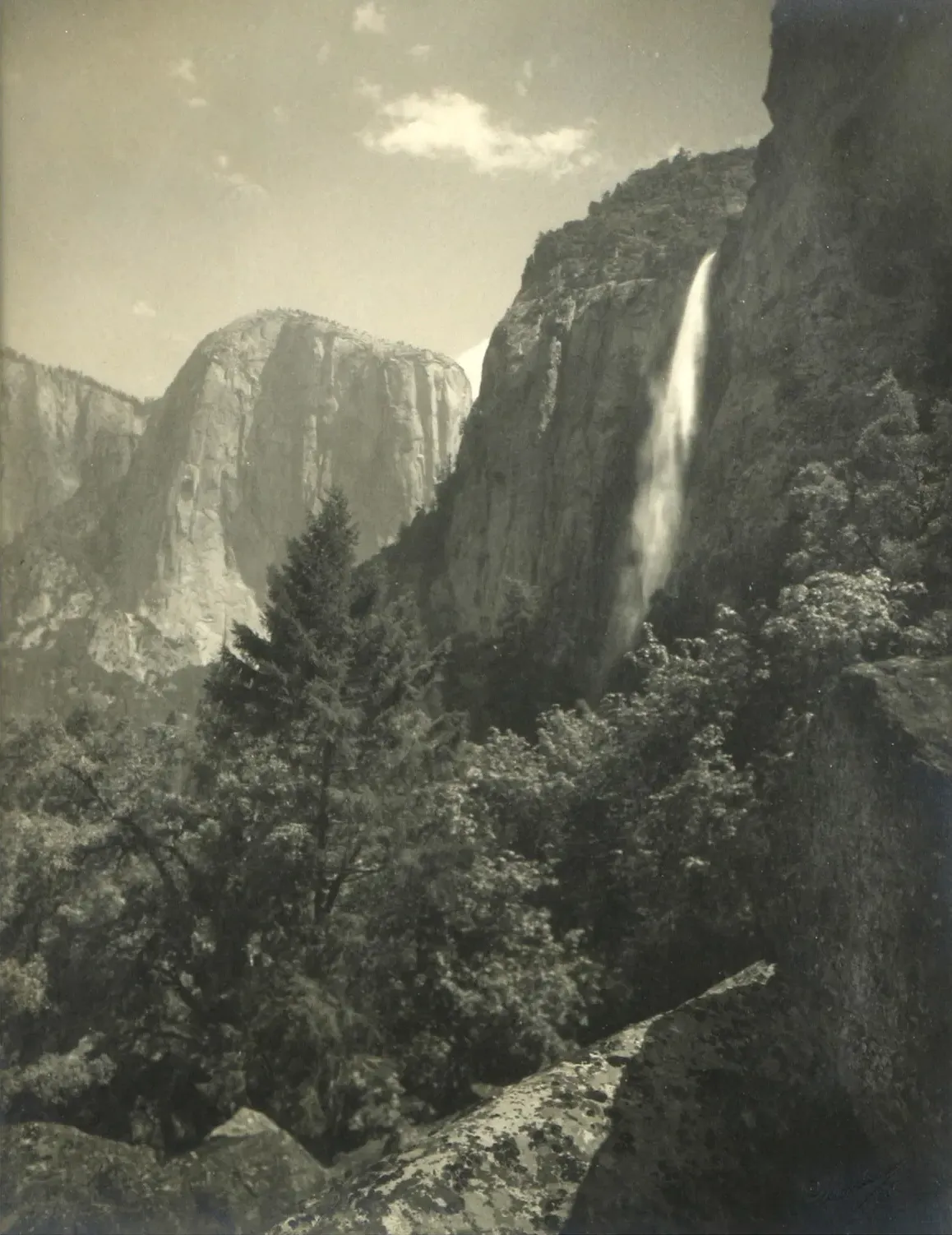
Yosemite Falls,
c. 1910

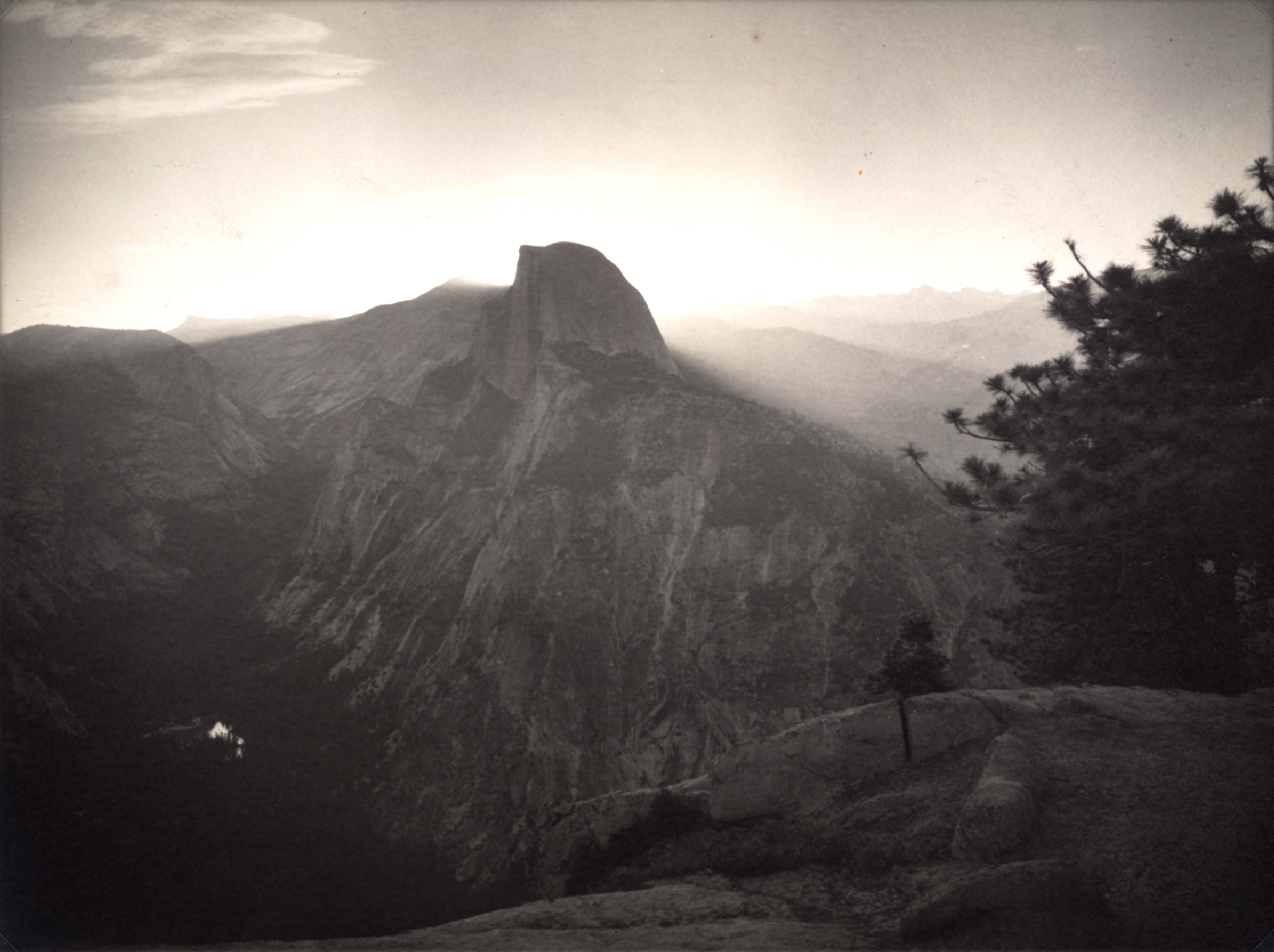
Half Dome at daybreak, c. 1910

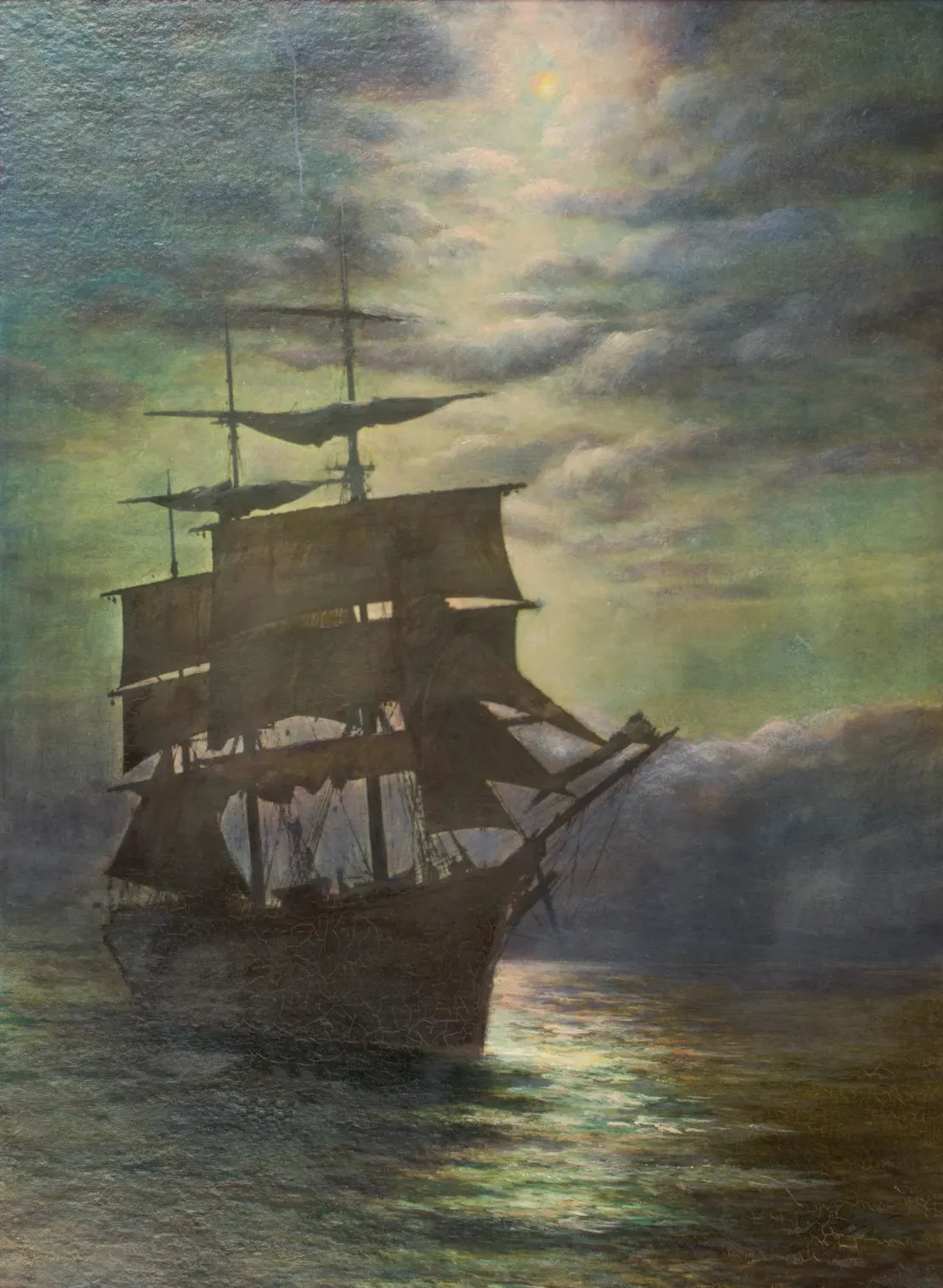
Clipper ship, c. 1915

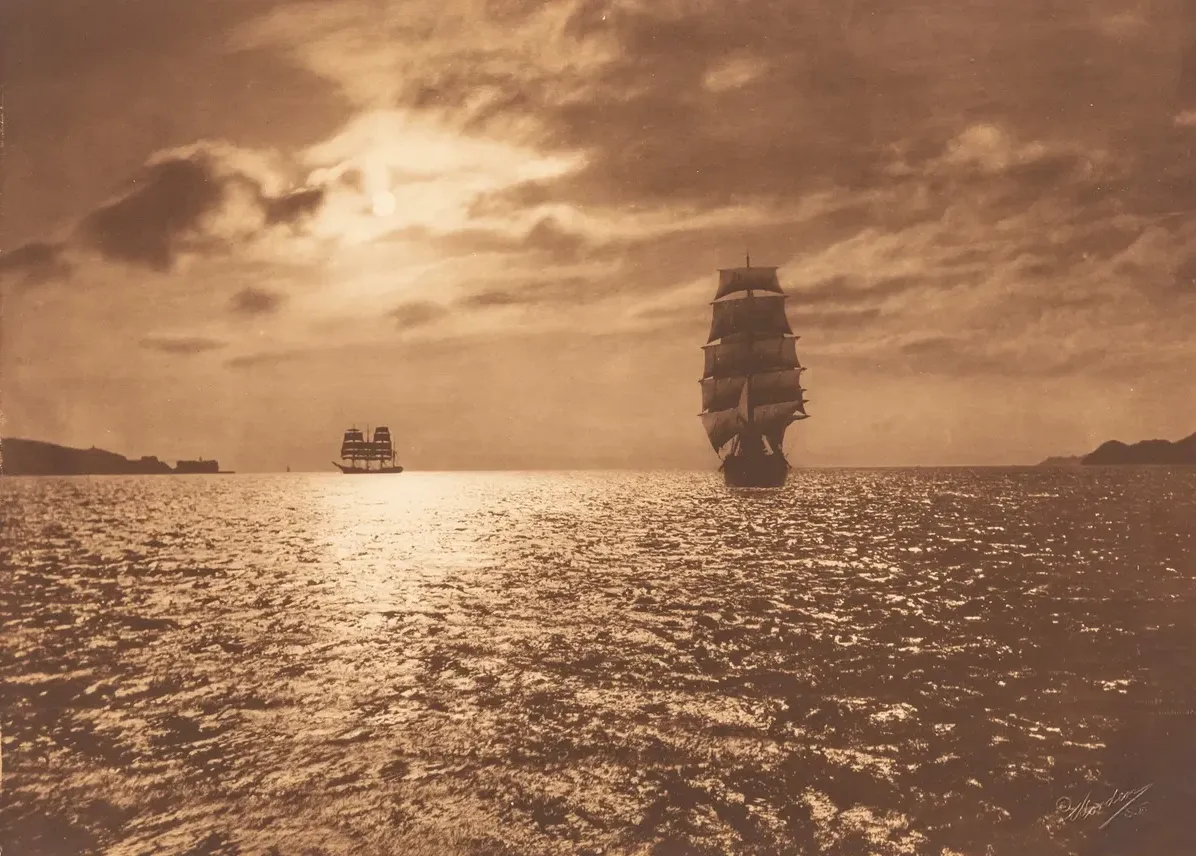
Ships on the bay, c. 1915

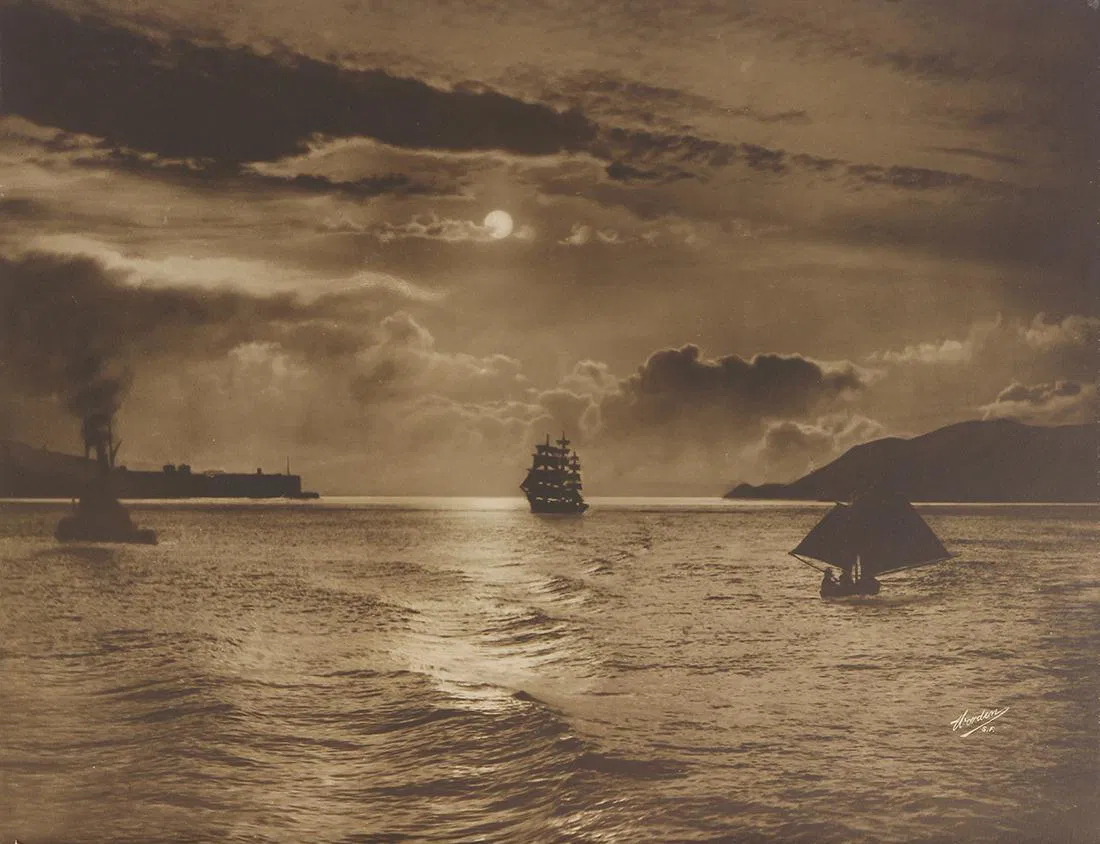
Ships on the bay, c. 1915

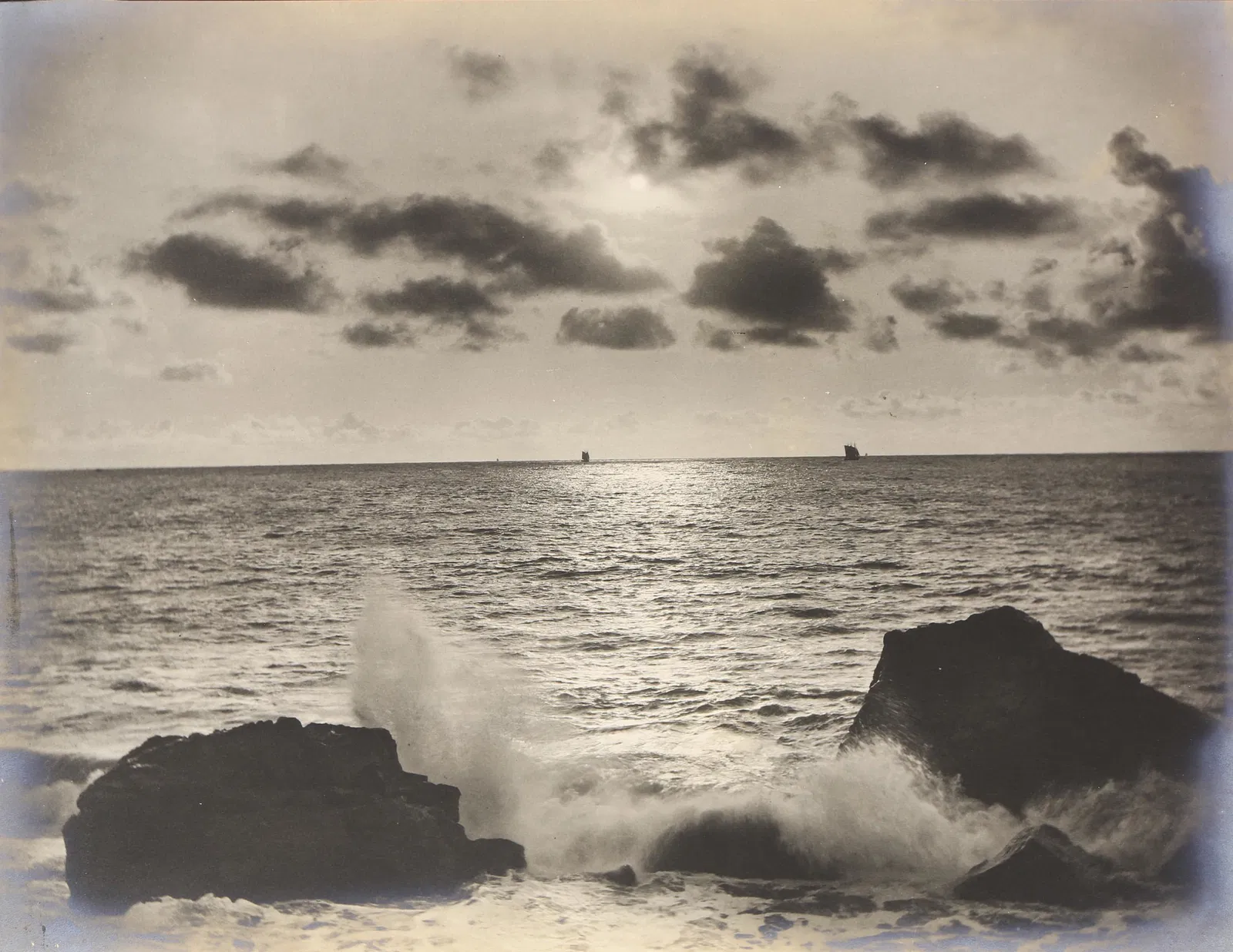
Crashing waves, c. 1915

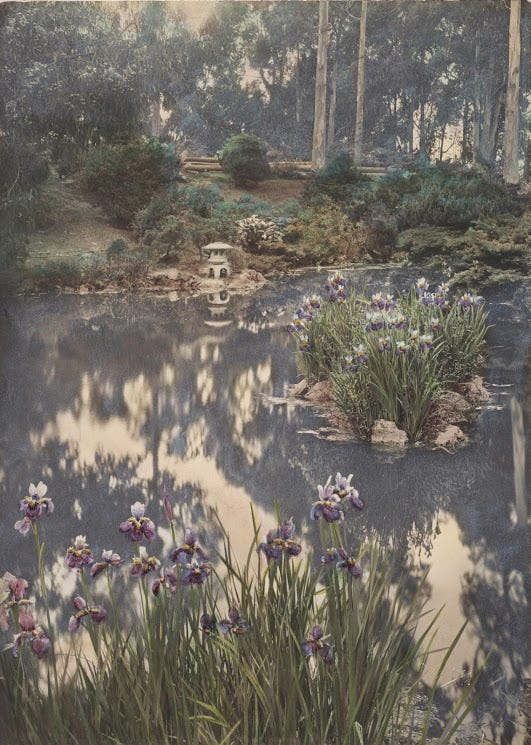
Japanese Tea Garden, c. 1915

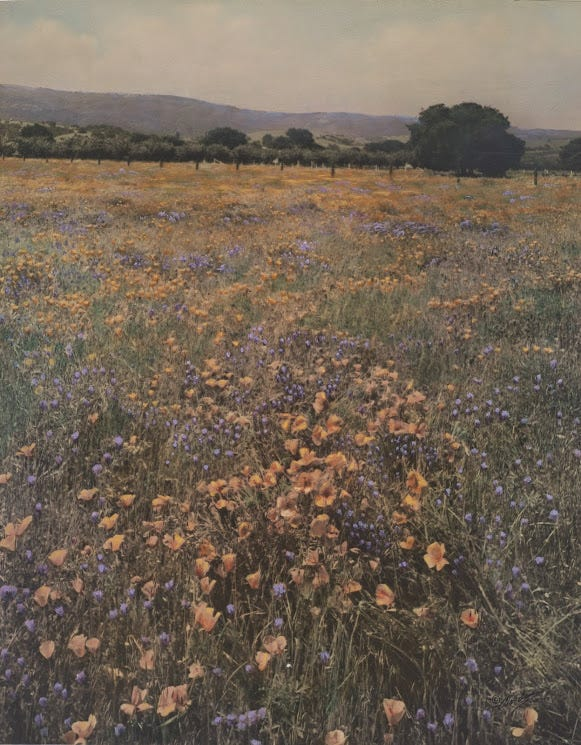
Poppies and Lupine,
c. 1915

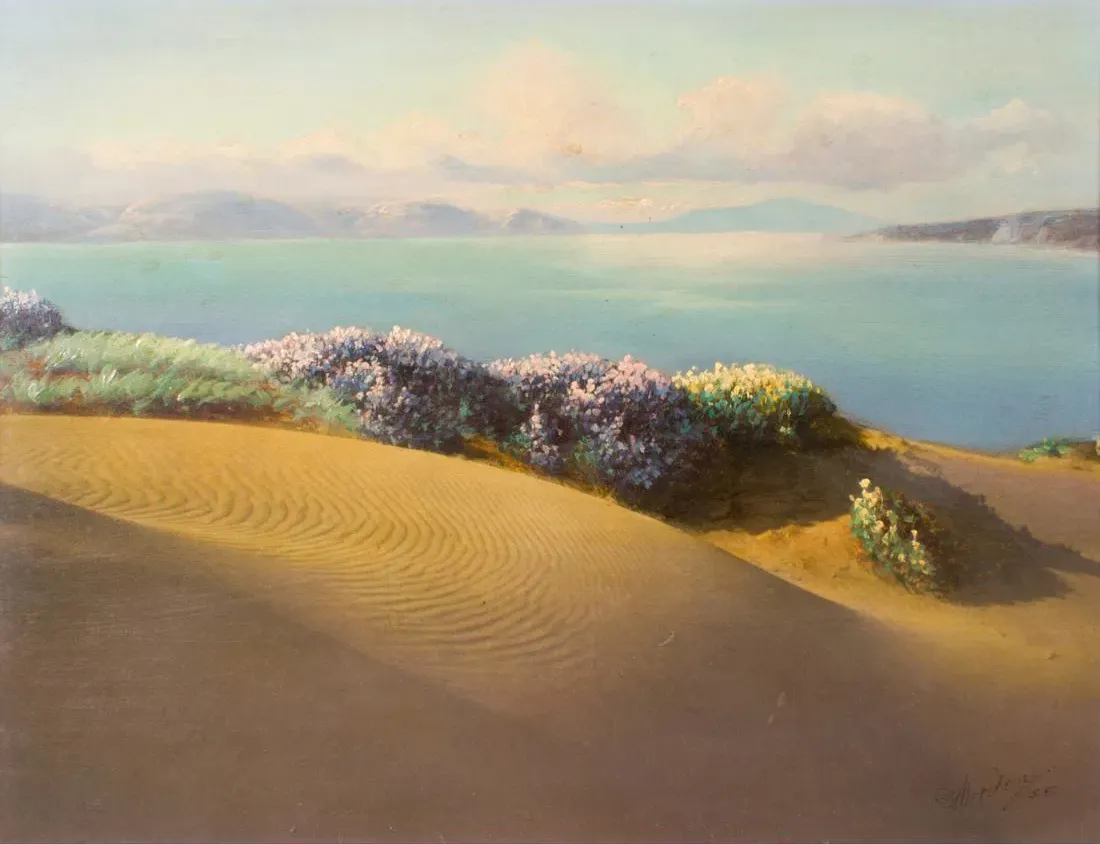
Sand dunes and flowers, c. 1915

=== Panama-Pacific International Exposition ===
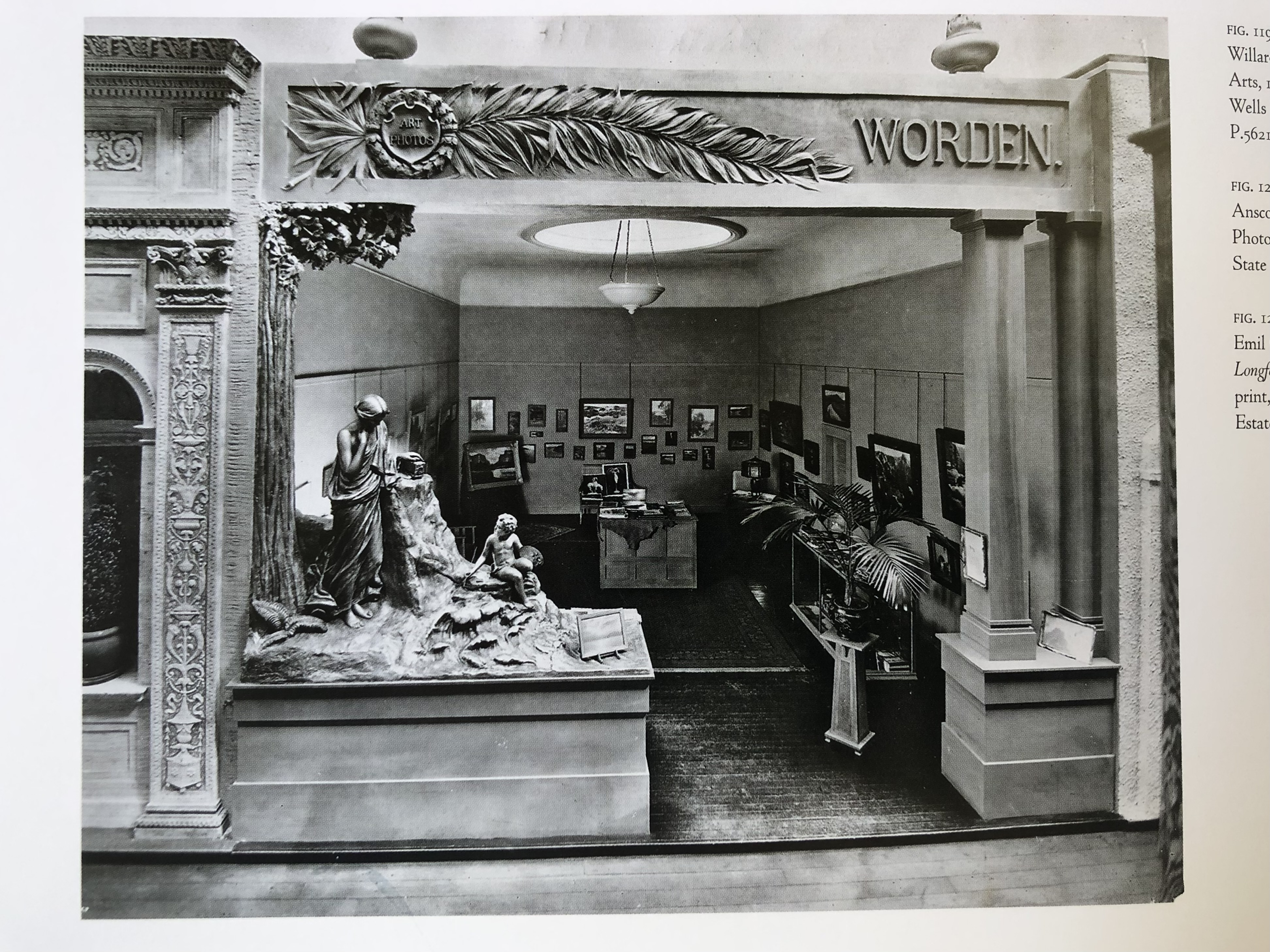
Photo by Worden of his exhibition space at the PPIE in 1915.

As preparations were underway for the Panama-Pacific International Exposition, set to open on February 20, 1915, Worden took advantage of his accreditation as an official photographer of the event to use his large-format cameras to record the PPIE's architectural and sculptural marvels. "His nocturnal photographs were particularly successful in capturing one of the PPIE's major technological innovations: its state-of-the-art illumination, which included concealed arc lamps to make the buildings glow at night and batteries of spotlights, searchlights, and projectors to highlight architectural details, pennants, and individual pieces of statuary. The spectacular lighting was enhanced in a number of Worden's photographs by its reflection in wet surfaces, an effect he deliberately captured by setting up his camera equipment after heavy downpours had partially flooded the walkways."

Inside the fair's Palace of Liberal Arts, Worden set up his own exhibit booth. The entrance featured an ornate entablature with the words "Art Photos" and "Worden," and a sculpture by Edmund Senn depicting a female "personification of photography," a camera, and a putto with a palette. Required to list "merits claimed for articles exhibited" when applying for the booth, Worden wrote: "Artistic composition in negatives, selection of view point, light, and atmospheric conditions to produce striking and pleasing pictures. Fitting the printing medium to quality of negatives to bring out its best qualities; quality and tone of the print as an artistic production." Asked to indicate his work's "beneficent influence on mankind," Worden wrote: "To stimulate the imagination, train the eye and mind to see and understand nature and to record nature in her noblest aspects."

The PPIE jury scored his exhibit a ninety-six out of one hundred possible points, earning Worden a medal of honor, the second-highest class of award.

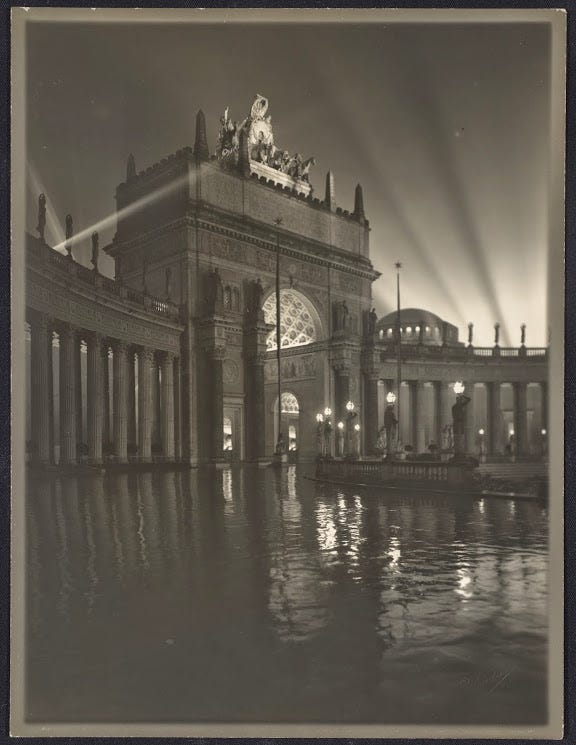
Arch of the Rising Sun

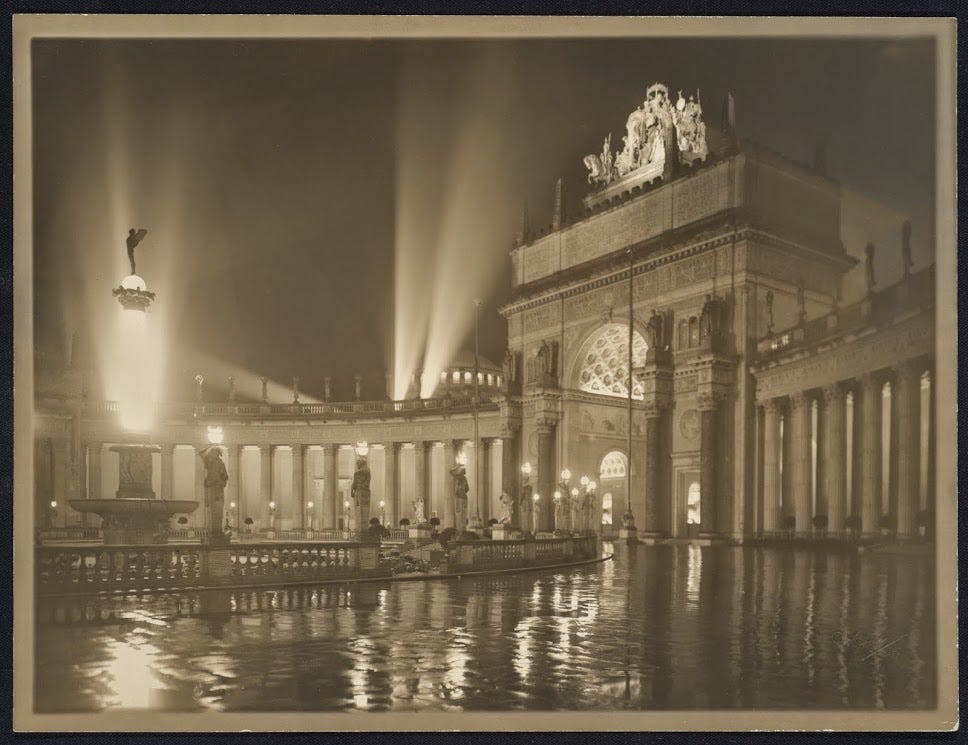
Arch of the Rising Sun

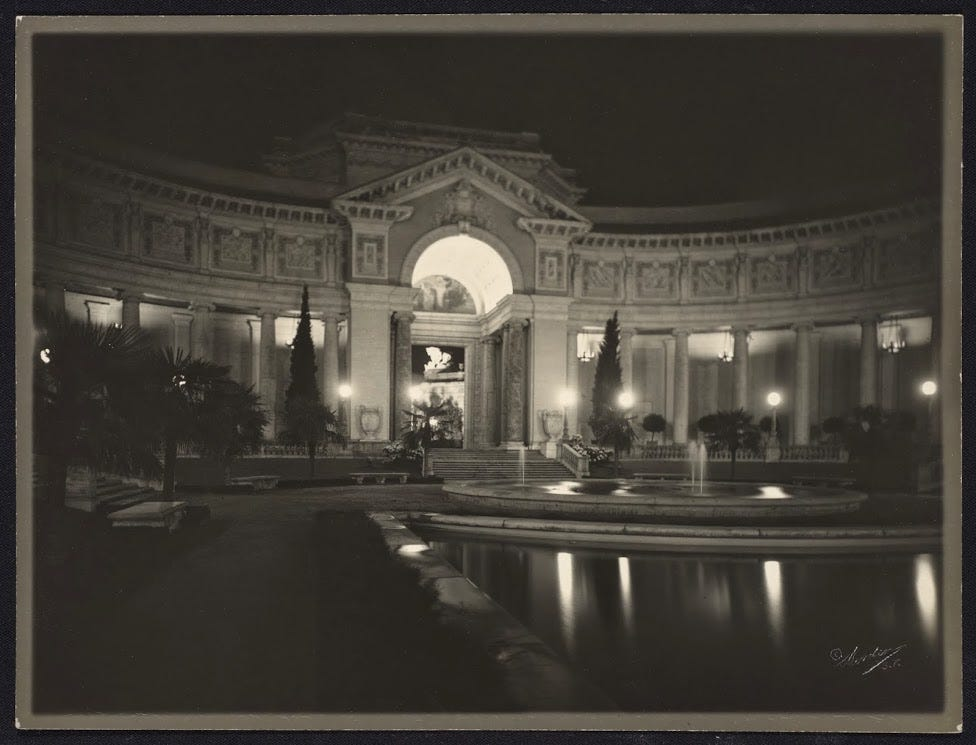
Court of Palms at Night

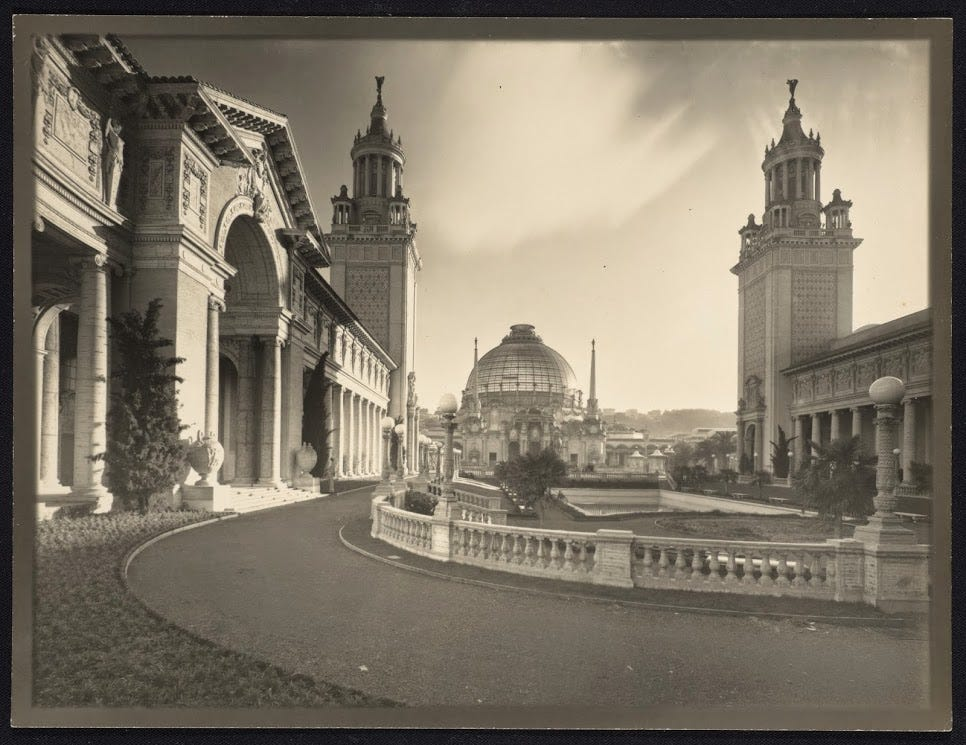
Court of Palms

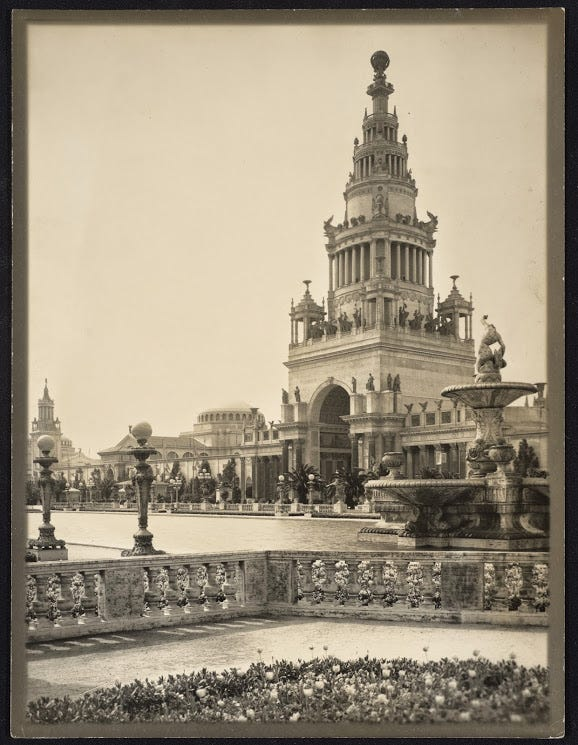
Tower of Jewels

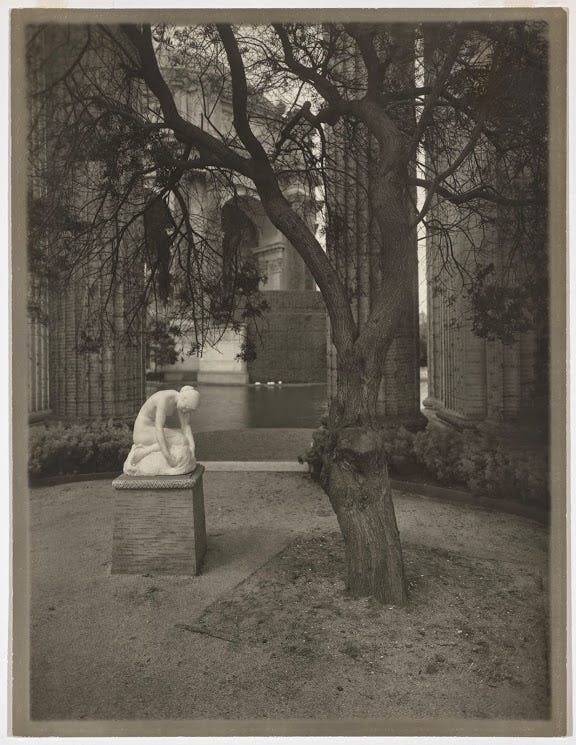
Edward Berge's Muse Finding the Head of Orpheus

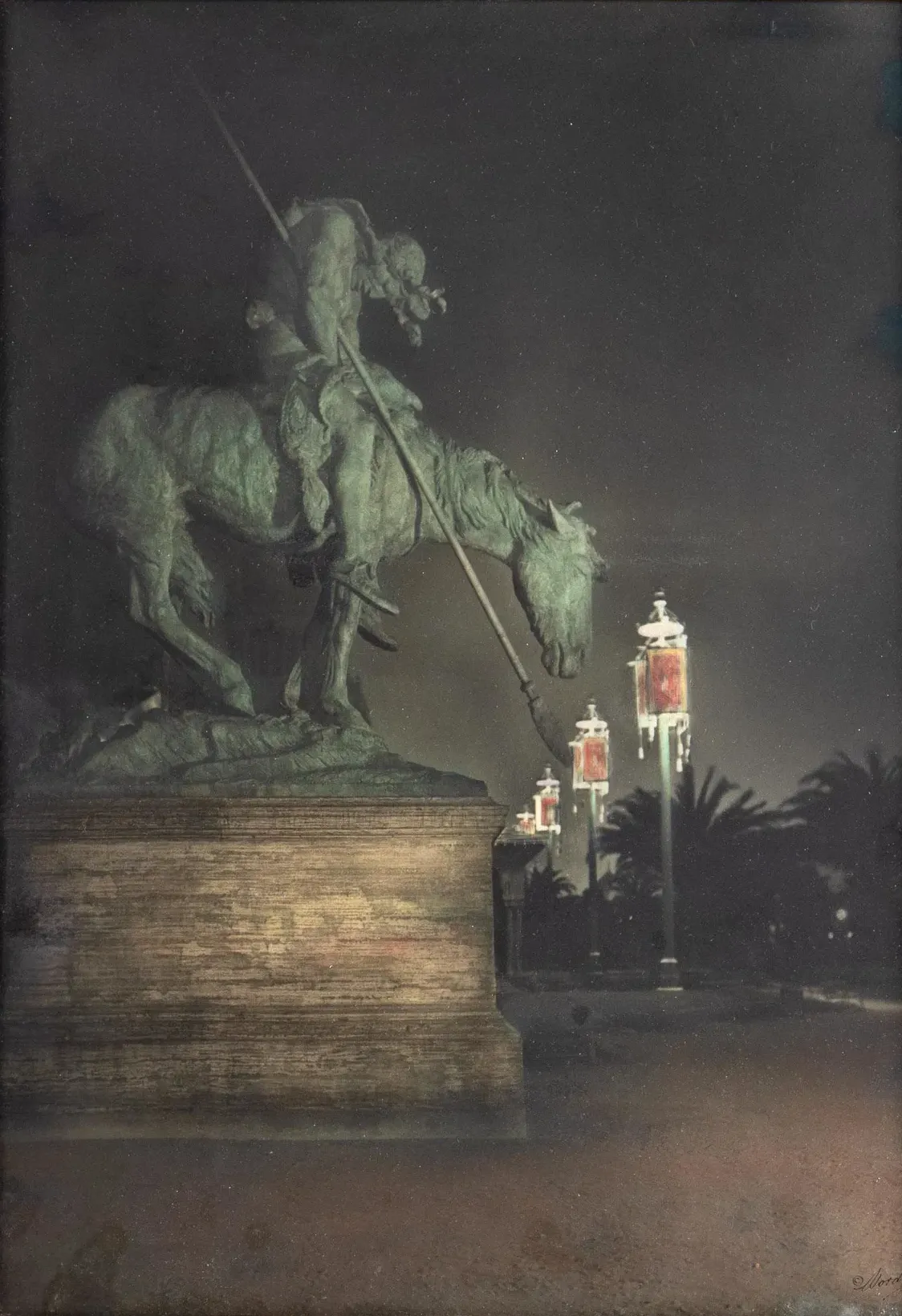
End of the Trail by James Earle Fraser

=== Union Square gallery; later years ===
Building on his success at the PPIE, on June 7, 1916, Worden opened Worden's Art Store and Studio at 312 Stockton Street, near the city's bustling Union Square. Worden sent out engraved invitations "to announce a permanent exhibition of Art Photographs," featuring "California in all her moods, with all her physical charms, vividly represented in colors direct from nature." Worden also produced color reproductions of Frank Brangwyn's murals from the PPIE, which were later installed at Herbst Theatre.

After opening his gallery in 1916, Worden's activity as a photographer gradually dropped off. His health may have become a factor; in 1924, at age fifty-five, he applied for a veteran's pension from the federal government, claiming invalid status. In 1926, the San Francisco Chronicle announced Samuel McCall as director of the "new Willard Worden Galleries," which increasingly showed paintings and prints by other Bay Area artists. By the 1940s it was functioning primarily as a frame and art-goods shop.

By the spring of 1946, the 77-year-old photographer's health was rapidly deteriorating. His assistant Teresa Glenn reached out to Catherine Harroun, director of the Wells Fargo History Museum, which agreed to archive and preserve hundreds of Worden's negatives.

Willard Worden died at the Veterans Administration Hospital in Palo Alto on September 6, 1946. He was given a burial with military honors in the Presidio's cemetery. "Although the modest memorial disregards his civilian accomplishments, it sits on a gentle slope overlooking the ever-changing conditions on the Bay, the Marin Headlands, and the Golden Gate Bridge, serving as the ideal resting place for a photographer who spent so much of his career exploring the scenic possibilities of his adopted city."

== Personal life ==
For four decades, Worden shared his homes in San Francisco with his bookkeeper and secretary, Teresa Beatrice Glenn (1861-1955), a slightly older Canadian expatriate. "The nature of their relationship appears to have been strictly professional, as Glenn is variously identified as a 'servant' or 'housekeeper' in federal census records...but her devotion to Worden...endured until the end of his life," when Glenn was instrumental in finding an archive for Worden's negatives.

== Legacy ==
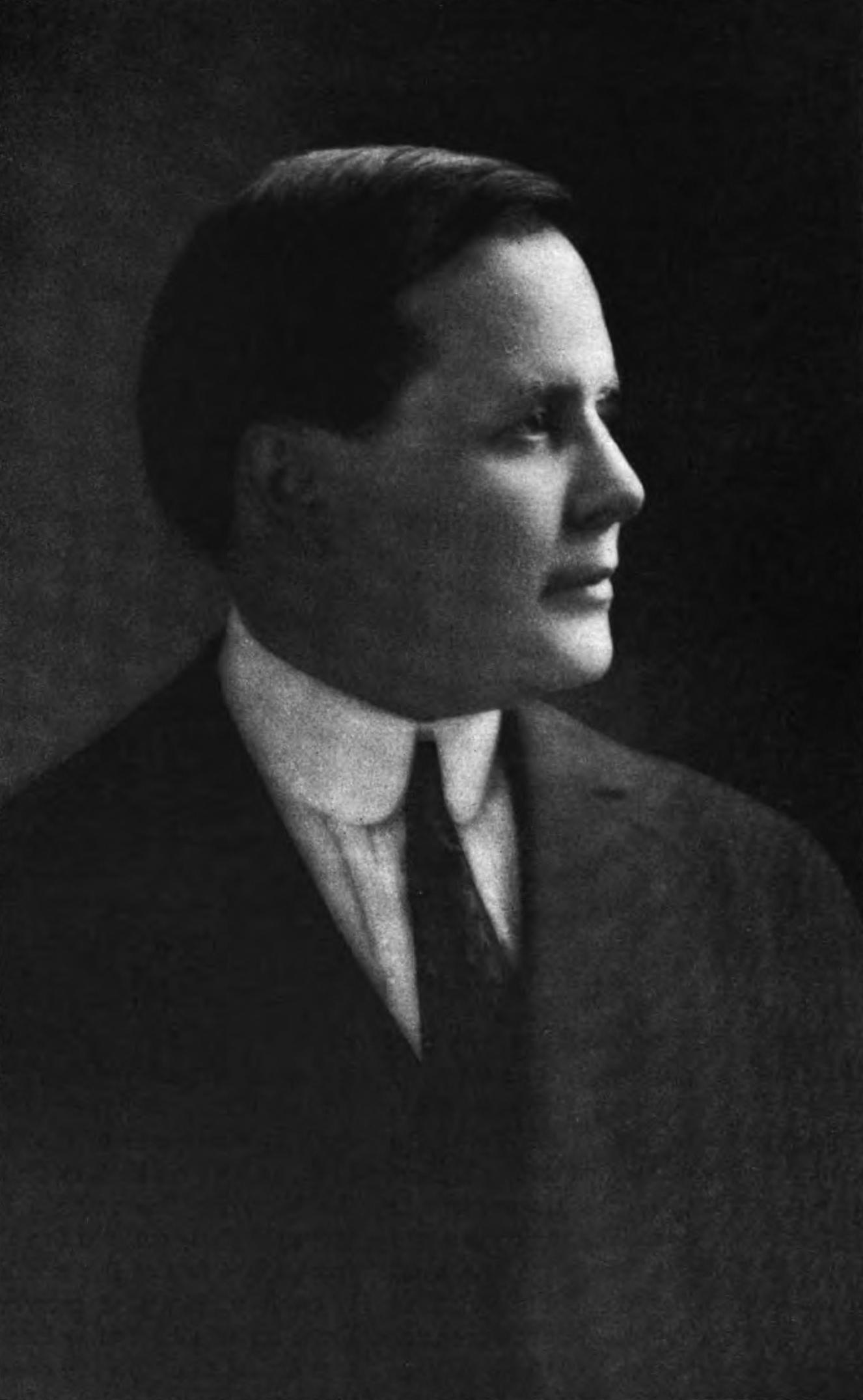
Worden in a photo published in California's Magazine in 1916.

By the time of his death, Worden's reputation had faded. While the archive of his negatives held by Wells Fargo would conserve his negatives, his art photography had passed out of fashion for home decoration; and notwithstanding the declaration by California's Magazine in 1916 that Worden "has brought photography up to the very pinnacle of art," Worden had never really been accepted by the gatekeepers of the emerging photography aesthetic. "At their best, hand-colored prints from Worden's studio could be exceptionally delicate and refined, yet this method was looked down upon by such members of the photographic intelligentsia as Stieglitz and Weston as a cheap corruption of the medium."

"The rediscovery of Worden's work began in 1976," writes art historian James A. Ganz, when collector Dr. Robert Shimshak acquired several hundred Worden photographs. Shimshak helped organize an exhibition of Worden's work at San Francisco's Focus Gallery in 1977 and later donated his collection to the Oakland Museum of California.

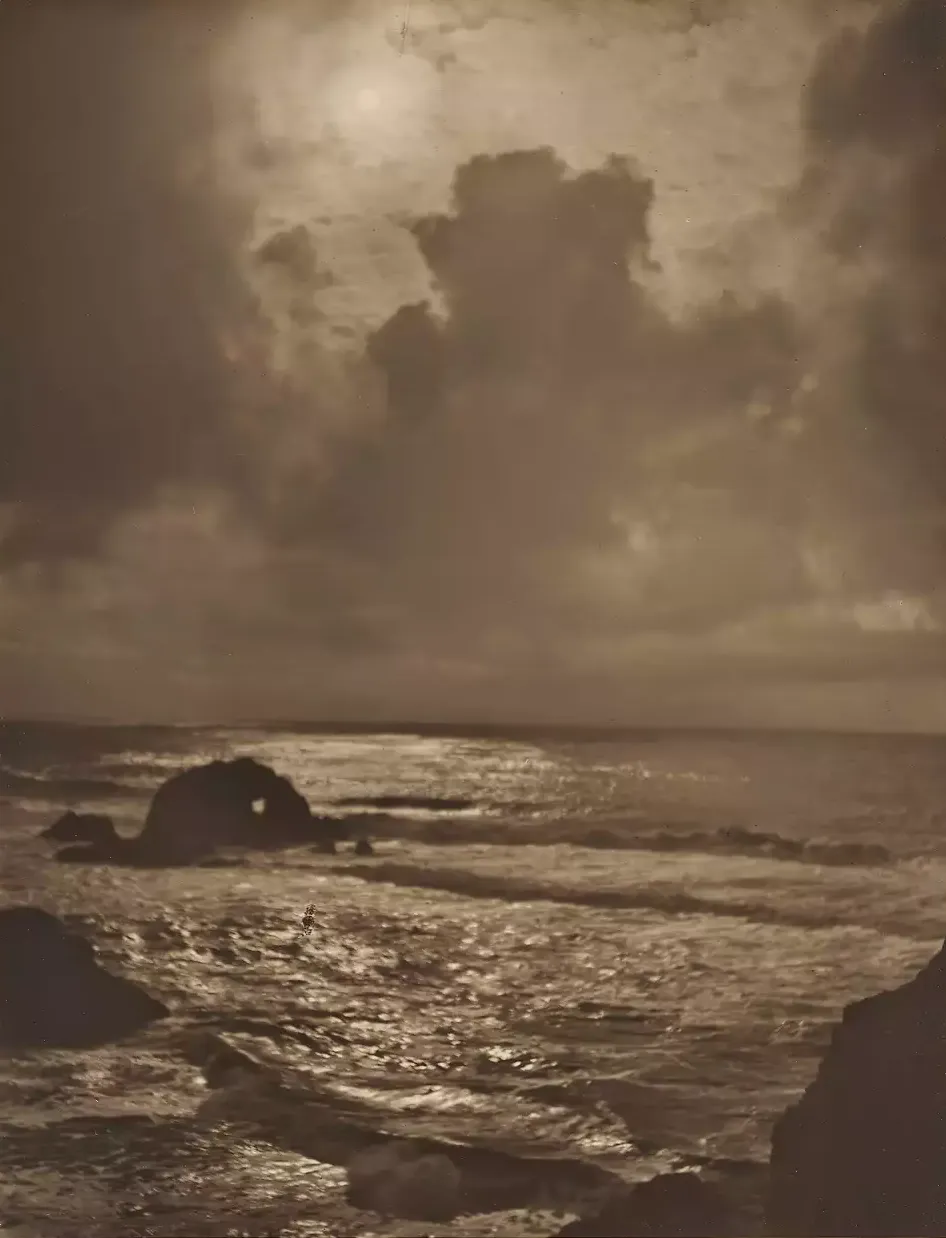
Seal Rocks and surf, c. 1915.

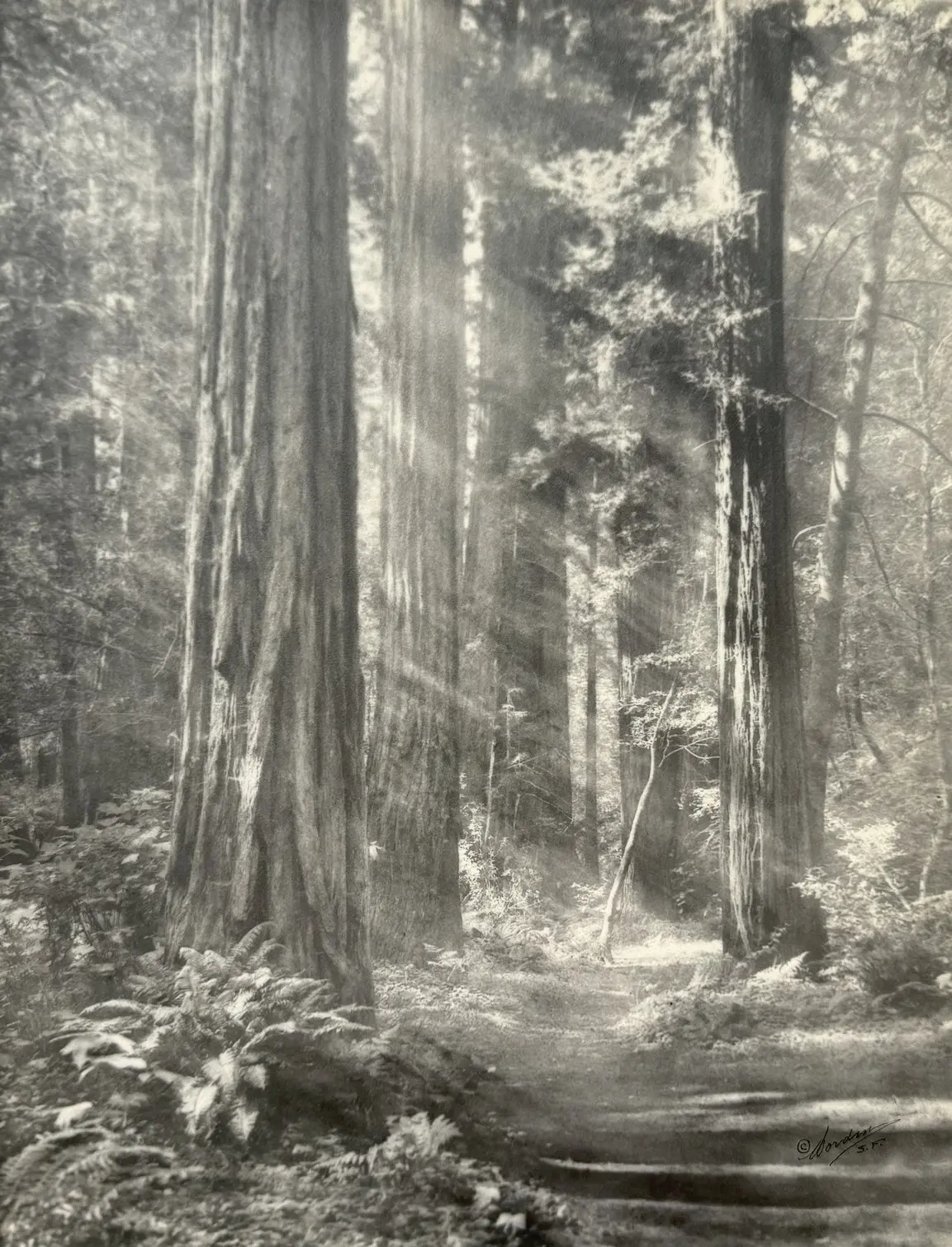
Slanting sunbeams and redwoods, c. 1910.

In the 1980s, works by Worden were acquired by the San Francisco Museum of Modern Art and by the Museum of Modern Art in New York. Works by Worden are also held by the Fine Arts Museums of San Francisco and by the California Historical Society.

In 1994, Worden was included in the exhibition Pictorialism in California: Photographs 1900-1940, organized by the J. Paul Getty Museum in Los Angeles and the Huntington Library. The Museum of Modern Art in New York included Worden in a large traveling exhibition, American Photography 1890-1965, shown in seven European venues from 1995 to 1997. In 2001, Worden was included in the Oakland Museum of California's exhibition Capturing Light: Masterpieces of California Photography, 1850-2000, and his work San Francisco at Night—City Hall Illuminated (plate 1) was reproduced on the cover of the exhibition catalogue.

The centennial in 2015 of the Panama-Pacific International Exhibition returned Worden to the limelight. Along with its major exhibition documenting the many aspects of the PPIE, the de Young Museum in Golden Gate Park (just steps from Portals of the Past) mounted a concurrent exhibit presenting "70 of Worden’s most evocative photos" and exploring his unique niche in the history of both photography and the Bay Area, Portals of the Past: The Photographs of Willard Worden. The Fine Arts Museums of San Francisco also published a companion book of the same name, with a ground-breaking biographical appreciation of the photographer by James A. Ganz, who told a reporter, "Worden had a refined eye for the Bay Area’s particular beauty. I think if you look at his landscapes, especially some of the dune pictures, they stack up against Ansel Adams."

At the same time, the growth of online shopping and online auctions has brought Worden’s widely scattered and long-neglected work back into circulation. His uncolored prints tend to command higher prices than his hand-colored landscapes and seascapes, possibly because they more closely align with established notions of fine-art photography. Today, as in Worden’s heyday, these works continue to offer a more affordable alternative to traditional oil paintings and watercolors.

== Sources ==
- "Art Photography", California's Magazine, Edition de Luxe, San Francisco: California's Magazine Company, 1916, 2: 197-200.
- Elder, Paul, editor. California the Beautiful; Camera Studies by California Artists; with Selections in Prose and Verse from Western Writers, San Francisco: Paul Elder and Co., 1911.
- Ganz, James A. (2015a). Portals of the Past: The Photographs of Willard Worden, Fine Arts Museums of San Francisco, 2015.
- Ganz, James A., editor (2015b). Jewel City: Art from San Francisco's Panama-Pacific International Exhibition, Fine Arts Museums of San Francisco and University of California Press, 2015.
- Johnson, Drew Heath, editor. Capturing Light: Masterpieces of California Photography, 1850-2000 (catalogue of the exhibition at the Oakland Museum of California), New York: W. W. Norton & Company, 2001.
- Mlle. Marie, "Here and There in the Shops," San Francisco Chronicle, March 17, 1918.
- Hughes, Edan. Artists in California, 1786-1940.
- "Willard Worden" (obituary), San Francisco Chronicle, September 9, 1946.
- Worden, Willard. San Francisco Views (portfolio catalogue), 1904.
- Zack, Jessica. "We should have heard about photographer Willard Worden", San Francisco Chronicle, July 21, 2015.
