= Portals of the Past =

San Francisco landmark

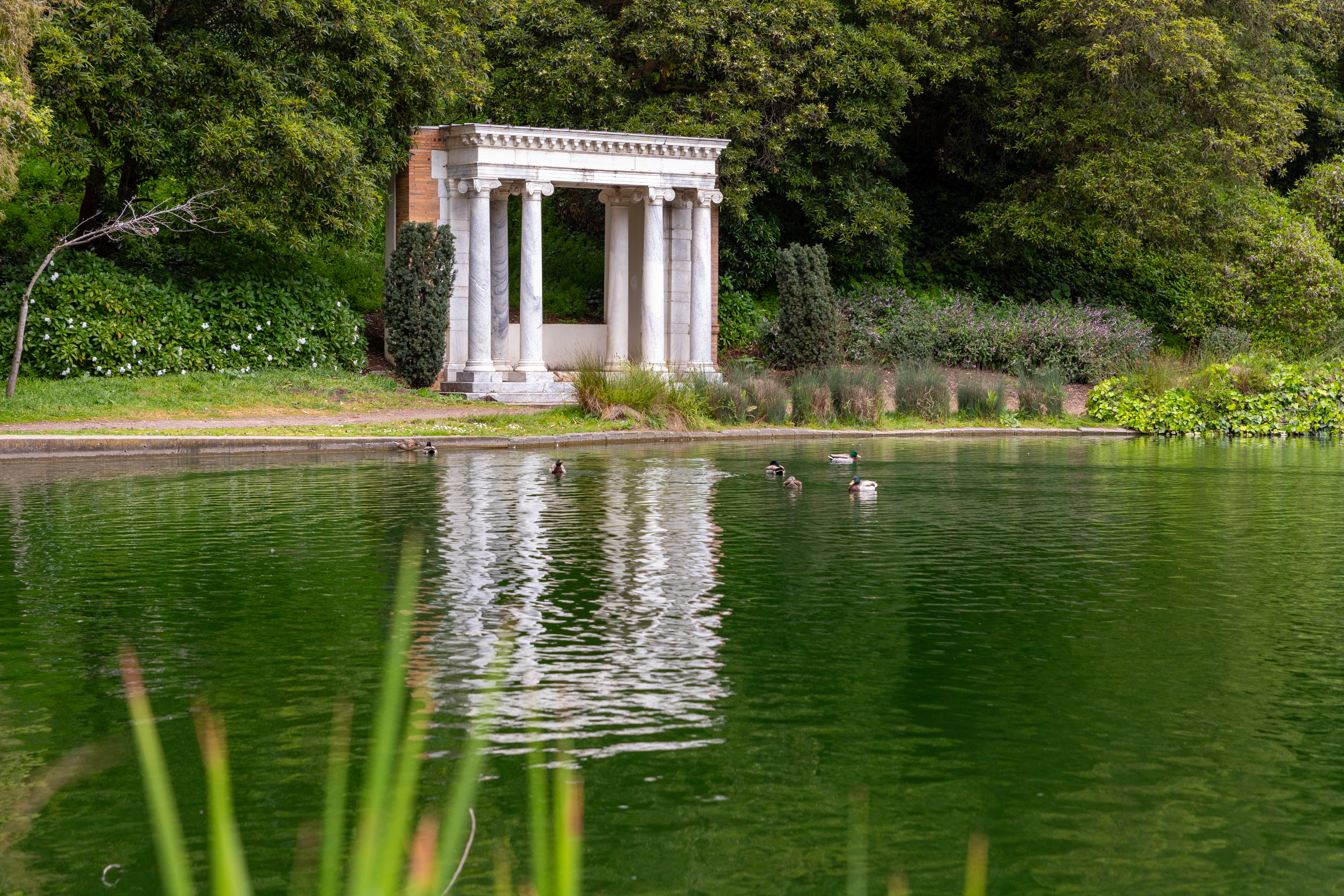
- Interactive map of Portals of the Past
- Location: Lloyd Lake, Golden Gate Park, San Francisco, California
- Coordinates: 37°46′13″N 122°28′56″W

Portals of the Past is the name given to a fragment of a mansion destroyed in the 1906 San Francisco earthquake that was later moved to Golden Gate Park, where it has remained ever since, becoming a much-photographed San Francisco landmark.

After the destruction of the earthquake and subsequent fire, all that remained of the Alban N. Towne mansion at 1101 California Street, on Nob Hill, was the marble porch with six marble columns. When viewed from a certain angle, the empty porch perfectly framed the ruins of the smoldering City Hall. The haunting image became an icon of the 1906 earthquake, due largely to photographs by Willard Worden. In 1909, the marble porch was relocated to Golden Gate Park, where, known as Portals of the Past, it became an enduring monument to the city's grief and a symbol of its endurance. Worden photographed the Portals both at the original Nob Hill site and at the final location on the banks of Lloyd Lake in the park.

== In popular culture ==
In the Bugs Bunny cartoon Bushy Hare (1950), Bugs pops up at Portals of the Past. The site is mentioned in Alfred Hitchcock's film Vertigo (1958) as a place where Madeleine Elster (Kim Novak) enters a trance and becomes possessed. The Portals of the Past also play a significant role in the novel License to Ensorcell (2011) by Katharine Kerr.

== Gallery ==
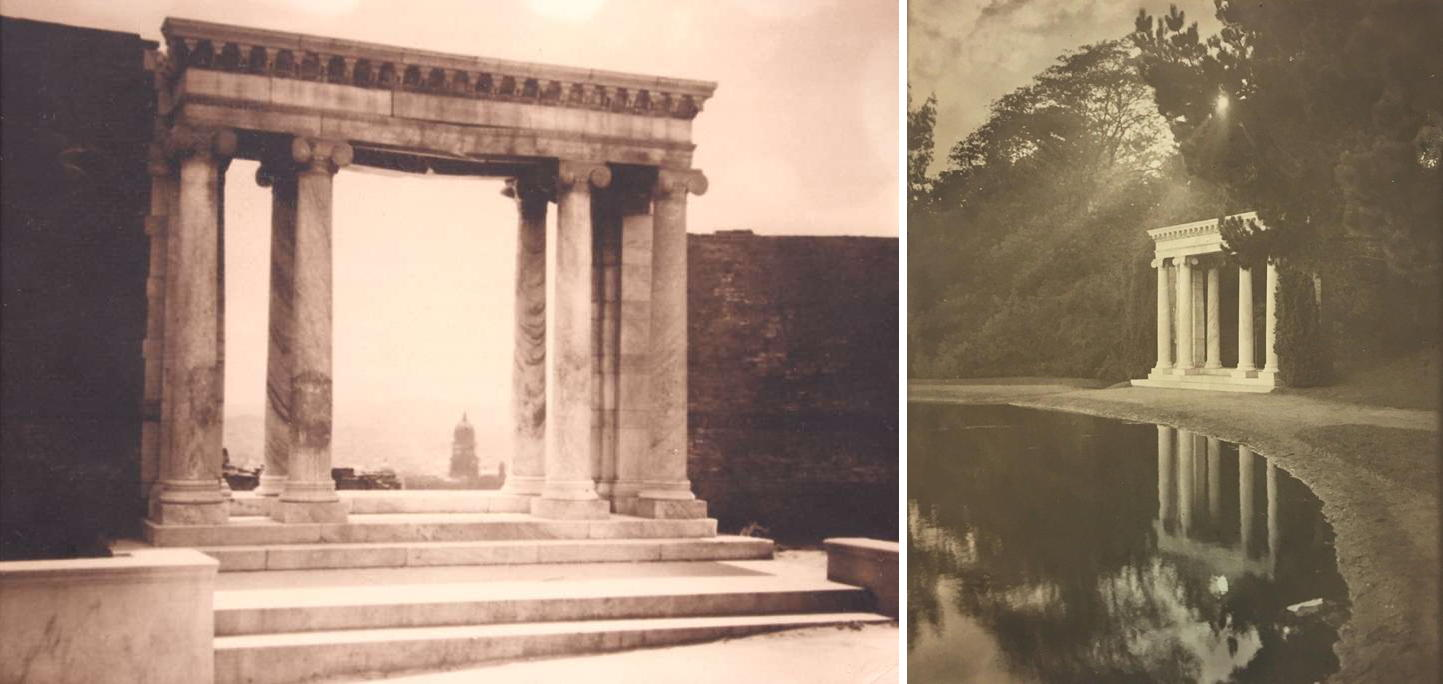
Photos by Willard Worden, after the 1906 earthquake and after the ruins were moved to Golden Gate Park.

"The Ruins Framed in Marble"

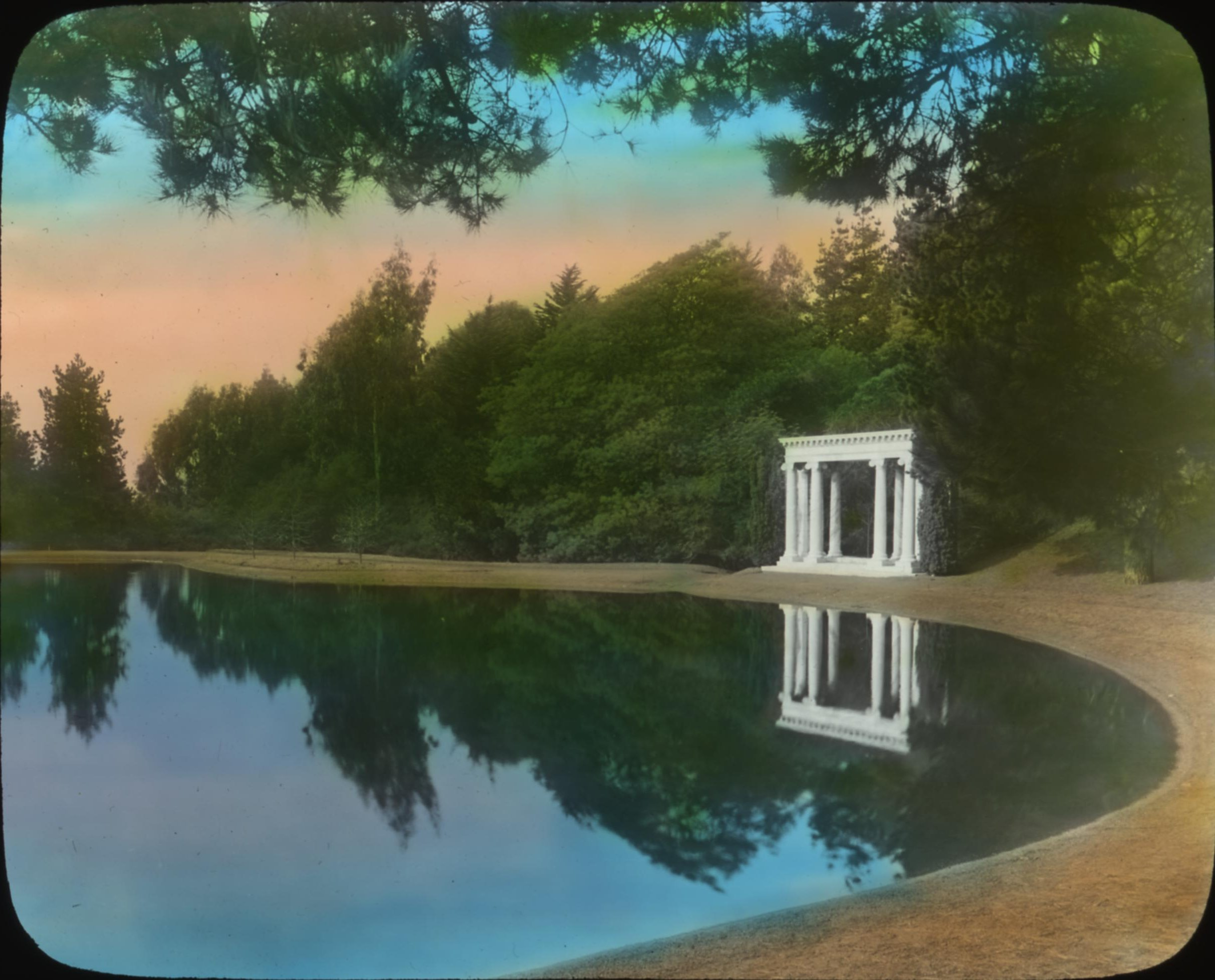
Vintage lantern slide.

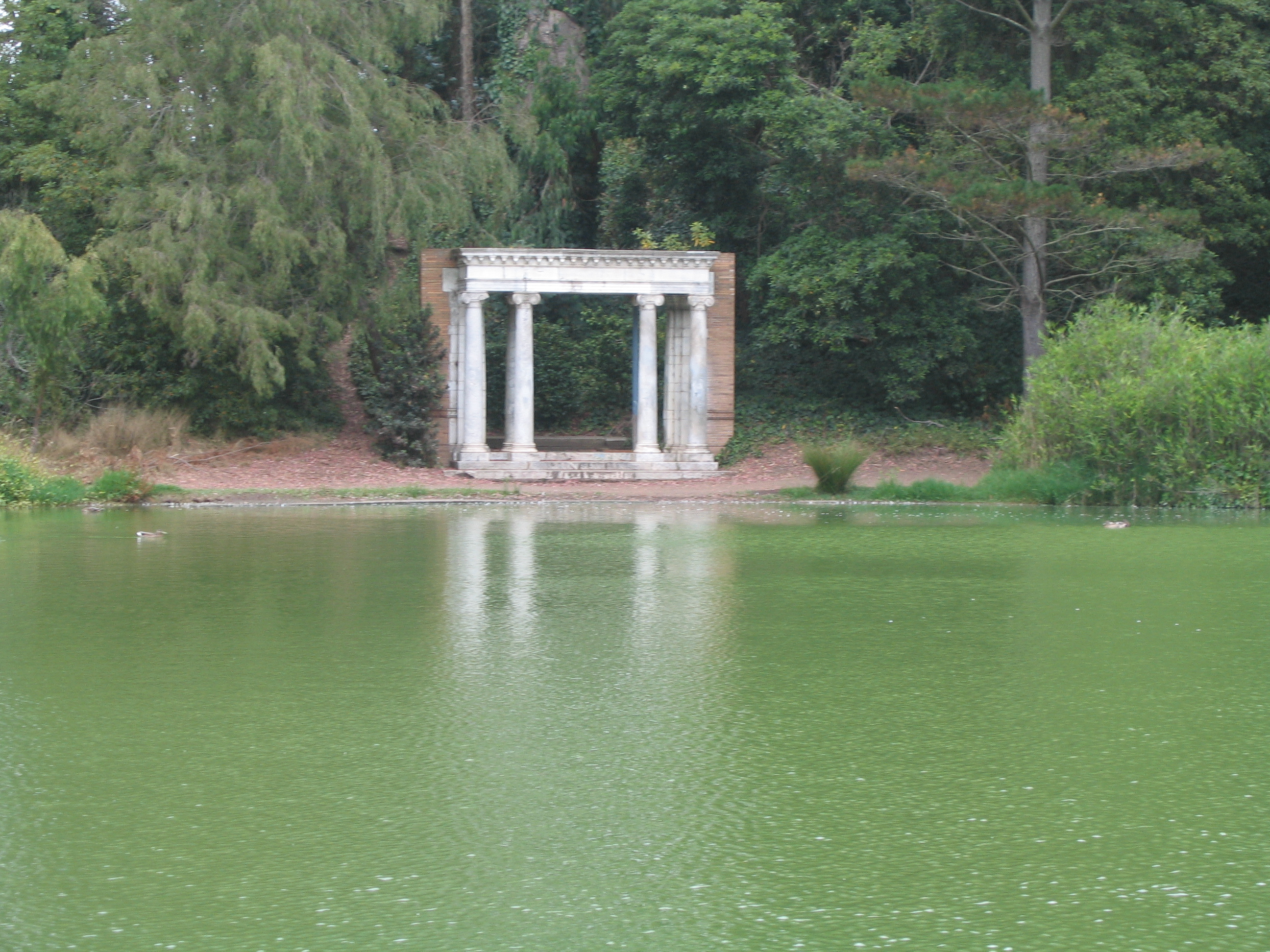

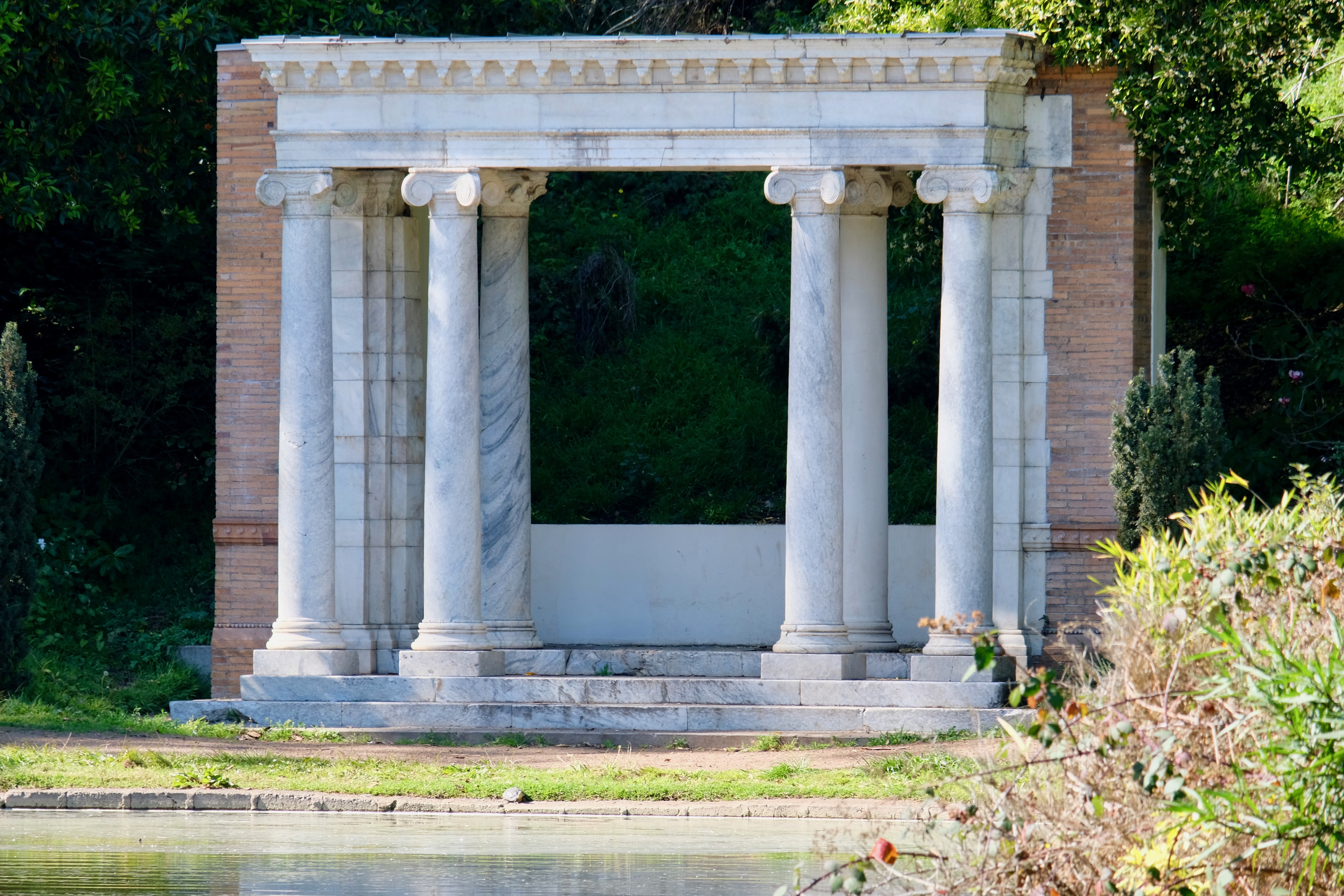

== Sources ==
- Ganz, James A. Portals of the Past: The Photographs of Willard Worden, Fine Arts Museums of San Francisco, 2015.
