= Lloyd Lake (San Francisco) =

Lake in California, US

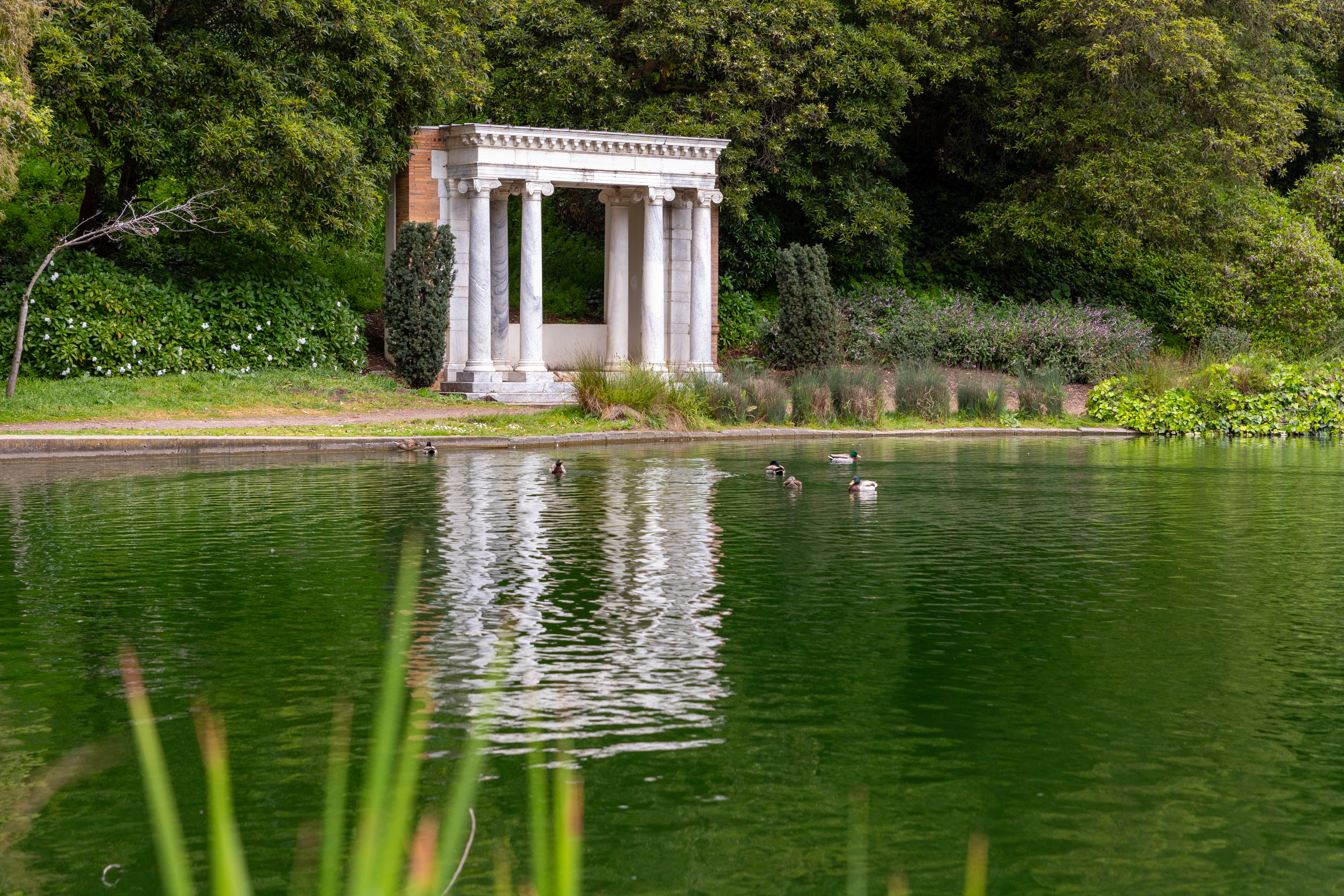
- Portals of the Past
- Interactive fullscreen map
- Location: Golden Gate Park, San Francisco, California
- Coordinates: 37°46′13″N 122°28′56″W
- Basin countries: United States

Lloyd Lake, also known as Mirror Lake or Kissane Lake, is a clay-lined lake in Golden Gate Park, San Francisco, named in memory of Reuben Hedley Lloyd, the park commissioner. It is home to a wide variety of non-native, non-migratory birds. Birds to be found within the lake area include geese, Pekin ducks, Muscovy ducks, Campbell ducks, mallards, gulls and pigeons.

== Portals of the Past ==
The lake is home to some early San Francisco architecture: the remains of Alban Nelson Towne's 1101 California Street, Nob Hill house can be found by the lake, between JFK Drive and Crossover Drive. After the 1906 earthquake and fire devastated the building, his wife presented the portico, popularly known as Portals of the Past to the park in 1909. All that remains of the mansion are the ionic columns of the entrance, which stand in isolation.

== In popular culture ==
In the Bugs Bunny cartoon Bushy Hare (1950), Bugs pops up at Portals of the Past. The site is mentioned in Alfred Hitchcock's film Vertigo (1958) as a place where Madeleine Elster (Kim Novak) enters a trance and becomes possessed. The "Portals of the Past" also play a significant role in the novel License to Ensorcell (2011) by Katharine Kerr.

== See also ==
- List of lakes in California
- List of lakes in the San Francisco Bay Area
